= Robbers' rummy =

Card game

Robbers' Rummy
- "A fun, but difficult, variant of Rummy"
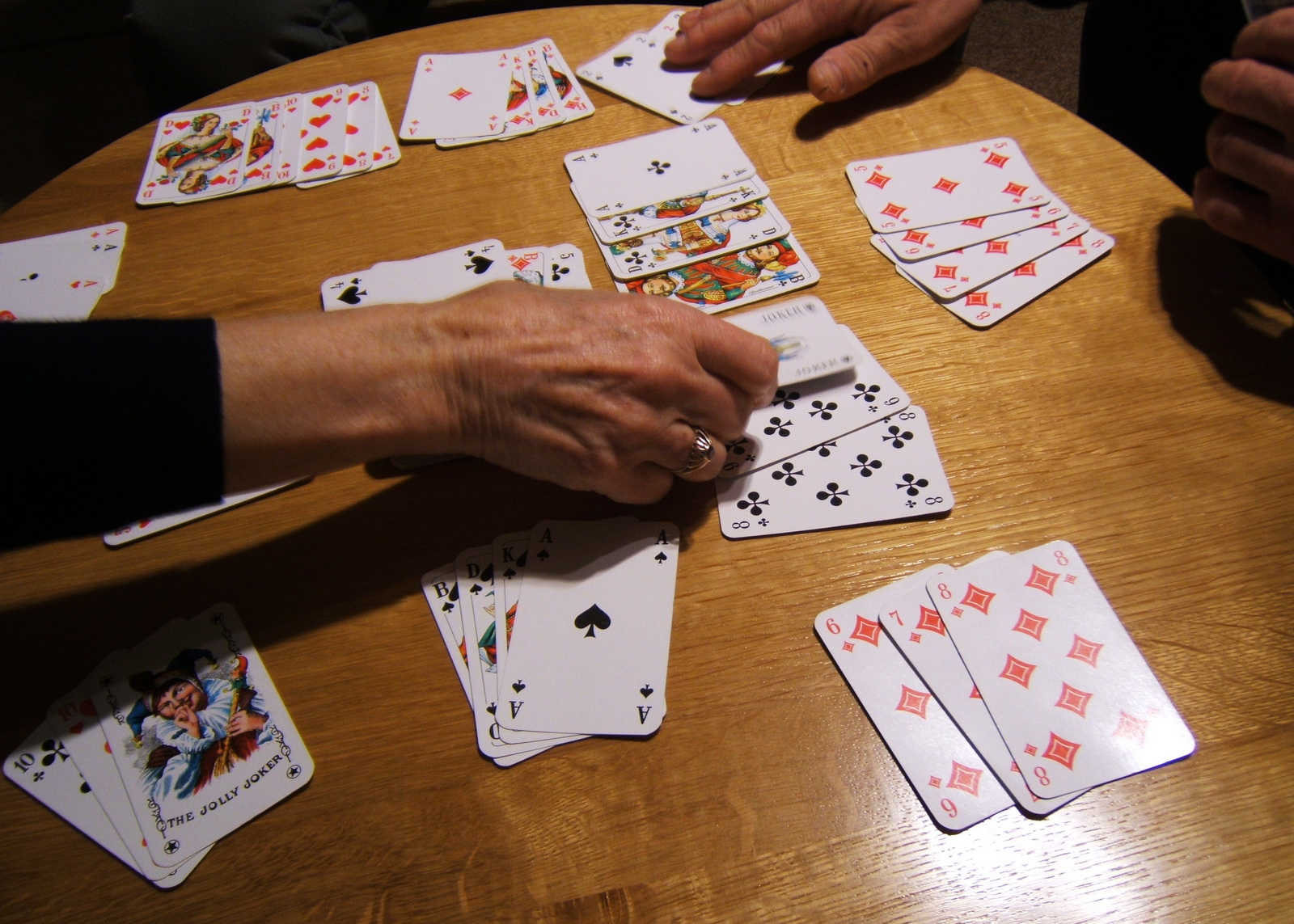
- A game of Rummy in progress.
- Type: Matching
- Players: 2+
- Age range: All
- Cards: 2 x 52 + 2-6 J
- Deck: French
- Rank (high→low): A K Q J 10 9 8 7 6 5 4 3 2 (A)
- Play: Clockwise
- Chance: Medium

Robbers' rummy is a card game for two or more players. It is a variant of German Rummy dating to the early 20th century. Being derived from normal rummy, it emphasises arrangement of cards based on card matching rules (generally simplified, but thereby no less challenging), while abandoning the notions of card discards and scoring entirely.

== Description ==
In Robbers' Rummy, not only are players allowed to lay off to existing melds as in basic Rummy, but they may also completely recombine the cards contained in the melds. In other words, players may 'rob' cards from already-made melds to make new ones. This makes it "much more exciting and engaging than any other [Rummy] variant...". Danyliuk describes it as "a fun, but difficult, variant of Rummy."

== Object ==
The aim of Robber's Rummy is to be the first player to discard all the cards in hand by forming melds and placing them on table.

== Cards ==
Robbers' rummy is played using two standard 52-card French packs, and 2 to 6 jokers.

== Play ==
Initially, each player is dealt 11 to 13 cards from the shuffled pack, whose remainder, called the stock is placed face-down on the table. The goal of each player is to reduce the number of cards held in hand by placing them on the table, face-up, forming melds. A meld is:

- Either any sequence by rank of three or more cards of the same suit (where the King may be followed by Ace, and 2, and so on),
- Any three or four cards of equal rank, but of distinct suits.

Any one Joker card used within a meld must be identified as one card of appropriate rank and suit.

At each turn, a player may place one or more cards from their own hand on the table, such that melds are formed (or extended). For this purpose, each player may rearrange any or all melds on the table, including, if necessary, by reassigning the identification of Joker cards; provided all cards on the table form melds eventually, in completion of the placement. All cards which were on the table, before the placement of the own cards from hand, must remain on the table.

An essential point to recognize is that any meld consisting of four cards may be reduced to an equally regular three-card meld by removing or robbing one card, which in turn may be used to form other melds. The name Robbers' rummy reflects the characterization, by proponents of normal rummy, of such liberty in playing this game as excessive, or even "offensive."

Examples of valid melds:

- On the table are 5♣ 6♣ 7♣ 8♣ 9♣; Ann holds the second 7♣ in her hand. She can now take the 5♣ and the 6♣ from the table and make a new meld with her 7♣.
- On the table lie the 5♦ 6♦ 7♦ and 5♠ 6♠ Jkr(black); Ben holds 5♣, 6♥ and 9♦ in his hand. He can now combine these cards together with the table cards to form new melds as follows: 5♦ 5♠ 5♣, 6♦ 6♥ 6♠ and 7♦ Jkr(black) 9♦.

Any jokers on the table may be re-used to represent a different card without having to be exchanged as in German Rummy, for example.

A player who was unable or disinclined to place at least one card from their own hand on the table accordingly, must draw one card from the stock into the hand. Alternatively, a player who did place one or more own cards on the table may draw one card from the stock, or must otherwise yield to the next player right away. After having drawn one card, the player at turn may still place any one or more cards on the table, and must then yield to the next player without drawing another card.

Danyliuk includes 2 additional rules:

- The top card of the discard pile may only be used if it is immediately laid off or melded; it must not be added to the hand.
- The player's first meld must score 40 points; cards may be laid off to existing melds in order to reach this total. To do this card values are assigned as follows: A = 1 or 11 depending on position, KQJ = 10 each, pips = 2-9 depending on face value.

== Ending ==
The first player to meld or lay off all held cards is the winner.

== See also ==
- German Rummy
- Liverpool Rummy
- Machiavelli (Italian card game)
