= Indian Marriage =

Indian Marriage may refer to:

- Marriage in India
- Indian Marriage (card game), also marriage rummy or 21-cards rummy, a Rummy card game in India

== See also ==
- Weddings in India
  - Hindu wedding
  - Indian wedding clothes
  - Indian wedding invitations, wedding cards in India
  - Indian wedding photography
  - Hindi wedding songs
