= Tong-its =

Card game, popular in the Philippines

Tong-its (also called Tongits or Thong) is a three-player rummy card game popular in the Philippines.

This game is played using the standard deck of 52 cards. The game rules are similar to the American card game Tonk, and also has similarities with the Chinese tile game Mahjong.

== History ==
Tong-its gained popularity in the 1990s in Luzon, the largest island of the Philippines. Its origin remains unknown but it was believed to have been introduced by the United States military in the 1940s, most likely adapted from the 1930s American card game Tonk. The game was evolved and popularized in Ilocanos as Tong-its, along with the similar game of Pusoy Dos. It spread to many parts of the Philippines, such as Pangasinan, into the mid 1980s, where it is called Tung-it.

== Rules ==
Like many popular card games, there are variations to the following rules.

=== Objective of the game ===
The objective of the game is to empty your hand of all cards or minimize the count and the scores of unmatched cards that are still on the player's hand by forming card sets (melds, also called a "bahay"(pronounced ba-hai), "buo," or "balay" in some languages), dumping cards and calling a draw. The player who gets rid of all the cards or has the fewest total points at the end of the game (when the central stack is empty) wins the game.

=== How to Play ===
Each player is dealt 12 cards while the dealer gets 13 and the rest of the cards are left as a central stack. The game begins when the dealer dumps a card. The next person can either pick up the disposed card if that card makes a set or adds to a set they have already or get one from the central stack. Collect hand combinations and dump unnecessary cards. The picking and discarding of cards goes on until someone wins by Tong-its, calls a draw or until the central stack runs out of cards. If this happens, the players tally the points of the cards they have at hand and the one with the lowest wins. In case of a draw the last person to take a card from the central deck wins.

=== Meld (Bahay) ===
Meld (Bahay) is a set of matching cards a player needs to collect in order to win the game. When a player collects a meld, they have the option to either lay it down, or keep it. However, a player must expose at least one meld to call or challenge a draw unless the player has a "Secret" or "Sagasa" in which case they can challenge (but not call). If a player fails to lay down a meld and does not have either special melds when the game ends, the player is considered “Burned” and will neither be able to challenge a draw (if one is called) nor eligible to win in the end tally count (if the central stack runs out).

Three-of-a-kind: three equally ranked cards (7♣ - 7♦ - 7♠)

Four-of-a-kind: four cards of the same rank/number, opened or held at the same time. is also called “Secret” or "Special" (J♣ - J♦ - J♠ - J♥)

Four-of-a-kind: four cards of the same rank/number, opened as a three of a kind, then the fourth card of same rank/number is added by the same person when displayed and the fourth card is drawn from the deck. This is called "Sagasa". Otherwise this can become a "Secret" or "Special"

Straight Flush: at least three sequential cards of the same suit (3♠ - 4♠ - 5♠) (8♦ - 9♦ - 10♦ - J♦ - Q♦)

Straight flush composed of 4 or more cards is also called a “Escalera."

== Ending the Game ==
=== "Tong-its" or Tongits ===
If the player is able to use all of their cards in combinations, by connecting to opponents’ or the exposed card sets (sapaw), or if the player gets rid of all their cards, then the player wins by Tong-its. A person can discard of their cards by forming melds and laying it down or making a "sapaw" on one of the other players' laid down meld. A meld consists of at least three cards (three-of-a-kind or straight flush) and a sapaw would be the fourth of those three, or the continuation of that straight flush.

=== Draw ===
A player with at least one exposed meld and has low points can call a draw before their turn given that no other players connected to that player's exposed meld before that. Otherwise, the player will have to wait for their next turn to call a draw.

Once a player calls for a draw the opponents can either fold or challenge the draw. Only players who have exposed melds are given this opportunity. A player cannot call for a draw if their exposed hand(s) has been melded (sapaw) by any opponent within the round. Players with no card sets exposed are automatically folded. When a draw has been called, the points are computed and tallied. The person with the lowest points wins. If a tie occurs, the challenger wins. In the event of a three-way tie, the player who decides to challenge the drawer lastly wins.

=== Deck pile runs out ===
When the central stack runs out of cards, the game ends. A player with no exposed melds automatically loses. The player with the lowest points in total wins. If there is a tie for the fewest points, the player that picks up the last card from the deck wins. If the two players that tied didn't pick the last card, the player on the right of the person who picked the last card wins.

A player who does not expose any melds before an opponent calls Tong-its or Draw is considered burnt or sunóg. Burnt players at the end of the game automatically lose.

=== Winning the Jackpot or "Two Hits" ===
Bets are added to a pot. The winner who wins two consecutive games collect the pot money. This can also be changed to 3 consecutive games wherein upon the second win the player gets an additional payment.

=== Spread ===
If at the beginning of the round, a player is able to connect all cards by forming melds or sets, that player automatically wins as if it is a Two Hits jackpot.

=== Burned ===
A player is considered Burned if the player is unable to form a meld or set at the end game. Also called Sunog in Tagalog and Paksiw in Visayan.

== Card Points ==
All the cards have corresponding points. The Rank goes:

   Ace 2 3 4 5 6 7 8 9 10 Jack Queen King.
   Ace is considered one point.
   All the Jacks Queens and Kings are 10 points each.
   All the other cards (namely, 2 3 4 5 6 7 8 9 10) match their value.[6]

== Joker mode ==
Joker mode adds the two Jokers to the standard deck and enables the Zero Count Fight mode and the Variable Payout.

== Digital Adaptations ==
In the 21st century, *Tong-its* underwent a significant digital transformation, evolving from a traditional street game into a globally accessible online activity. This shift began in the early 2010s, driven by the demand from Overseas Filipino Workers (OFWs) seeking to connect with their cultural roots while abroad. Early digital adaptations, such as Tongits Wars, gained traction among communities in the Middle East and Africa, functioning as a "social bridge" for workers isolated from their families.
