= Quatorze =

Card game

Quatorze (the number "14" in French) is a 2+ player card game with origins in Lebanon. It is a Lebanese variety of rummy.

== Deck ==
Quatorze is played with 2 standard 52-card decks and 1 or 2 jokers mixed together. The ranking (in descending order), is Ace, King, Queen, Jack, 10, 9, 8, 7, 6, 5, 4, 3, 2, Ace.

== Method ==
The objective of Quatorze is to have the lowest possible score and cause the other players to reach a score of 201+.

=== Dealing the cards ===
The dealer alternates to the right each round with the first dealer chosen arbitrarily. The dealer shuffles the cards and the person to their left cuts the deck. If the bottom card of the cut section is a joker then the player that cut is allowed to keep the joker. The cut section in the player's hand is then placed on the table (stockpile) and the dealer deals the cards in their hand first, taking from the top of the stockpile if needed. The player to the right of the dealer is first dealt 3 cards then each next player (including the dealer) is dealt 2 cards at a time in an anti-clockwise fashion until each player has 14 cards except the player to the right of the dealer who should have 15. Any cards remaining with the dealer go on top of the stockpile.

=== Game play ===
First, the player with 15 cards strategically chooses 1 card to discard face up forming the discard pile. The player to their right can then either draw the top card on the discard pile or draw a (face-down) card from the stockpile. The player can only draw the top card from the discard pile if it will then be used to meld their cards. Melding is how players get rid of their cards in order to maintain a low score. Going down consists of cards being placed on the table either in triplets or quadruplets of different suits (e.g. 10 of spades + 10 of hearts + 10 of clubs or 3 of spades + 3 of hearts + 3 of diamonds). In addition, a series of cards of the same suit can be placed (e.g. 9 of hearts, 10 of hearts, Jack of hearts etc..) with a minimum of three cards in the series and a maximum of 13. Essentially, the sum of all the cards a player uses to meld the first time must amount to a minimum of 51 (e.g. 7 of hearts, 7 of spades, 7 of diamonds + Jack of hearts, Queen of hearts, and King of hearts = 51). After a player has put down a minimum of 51, they can begin to place sets as they collect them (e.g. they could add the 7 of clubs to the above set or place down the 4 of hearts, 4 of clubs, 4 of spades all together on to the table). Once a player has melded a minimum of 51, they can add to any other player's cards that have been melded on the table to either complete a set of 4 or continue a series. With each turn, players must end their turn by discarding a card. This means that a player holding two cards in their hand cannot draw a third and place them down to finish a set because they would not have a card left to discard. Once one player has finished their cards that round is over.

=== Scoreboard ===
The scoreboard in Quatorze is calculated a little differently than other card games. Instead of your score going higher as you win, it drops. The score can be negative if necessary.

The winning person will earn -30 points every time they win, and the number of points the losing player will earn is the value of his cards. (Ex. If the losing player had a 2 of spades, 9 of spades, and queen of hearts, they would earn 21 points.) Jokers are worth 25 points alone. Yet if you meld all your cards at once without adding some of your cards to other players' cards, you will earn -60 points. And the losing player's amount gets doubled for the scoreboard.
