= Rummy =

Group of matching-card games

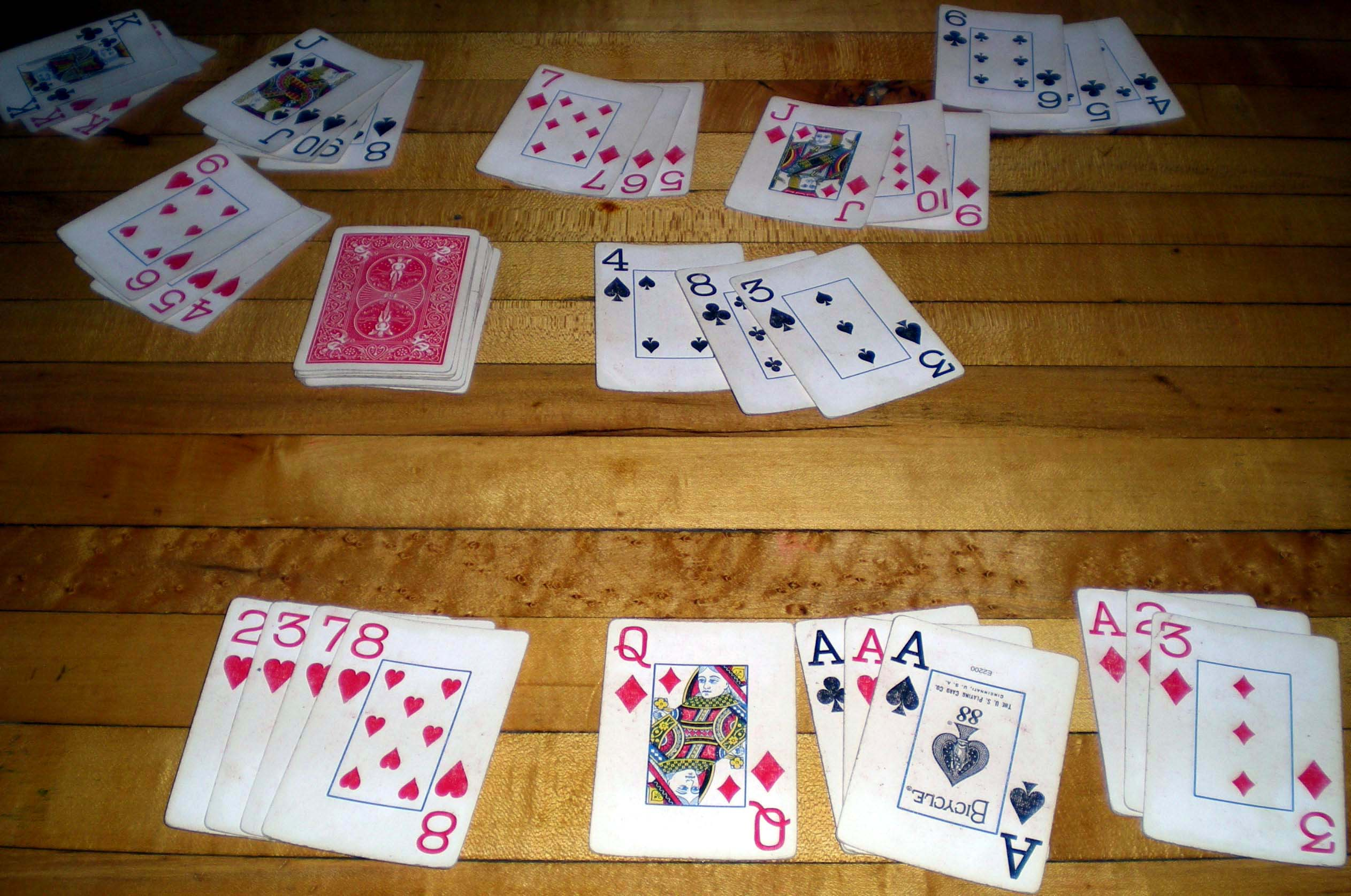
- Origin: Mexico or China
- Age range: All
- Cards: Varies with game
- Deck: Varies with game
- Play: Varies with game
- Playing time: Varies with game
- Chance: Medium

Related games
- Related Games

Rummy is a group of games related by the feature of matching cards of the same rank or sequence and same suit. The basic goal in any form of rummy is to build melds which can be either sets (three or four of a kind of the same rank) or runs (three or more sequential cards of the same suit) and either be first to go out or to amass more points than the opposition.

== Origin ==
There are two common theories about the origin of rummy, attributing its origins in either Mexico or China in the nineteenth century. The first is that it originated in Mexico around the 1890s in a game described as Conquian in R.F. Foster's book Foster's Complete Hoyle, which was played with a 40 card Spanish deck and had melding mechanics. The second is that Rummy originated in Asia, and that Rummy was the result of a Mahjong variant named Kun P'ai that was Westernized as Khanhoo by W.H. Wilkinson in 1891.

Games scholar David Parlett combines these two theories, and proposes that the Mexican game of Conquian, first attested in 1852, is ancestral to all rummy games, and that Conquian is the equivalent of the Chinese game Khanhoo. The rummy principle of drawing and discarding with a view to melding appears in Chinese card games at least in the early 19th century, and perhaps as early as the 18th century.

Rummy variations like Gin and Canasta became popular in the twentieth century. Rummy games are popular in India, and it is likely that Indian rummy is an extension of gin rummy and 500 rum, which originated from the United States.

Several theories about the origin of the name "rummy" exist. Some attribute it to the British slang word rum, meaning odd, strange, or queer. Others say the origin lies in the game Rum Poker, or in the popular liquor of the same name.

== General features of rummy-style games ==
=== Deal ===
Depending on the variation, each player receives a certain number of cards from either a standard deck of 52 cards, more than one deck or a special deck of cards used for specific games. The un-dealt cards are placed in a face down stack in the middle, which is known as the stock. In most variations, a single card is turned face up next to the stock where players discard or shed cards, and this is known as the discard pile. In 10 Cards Rummy, which is often played with two, three or four players, each player gets ten cards. In rummy games with five players, each player is given six cards. In 500 Rummy, each player is given seven cards. In Indian Rummy, 13 cards are dealt to each player.

=== Melds ===
A meld can either be a set (also known as a book) or a run. A set consists of at least three cards of the same rank, for example 4♥ 4♦ 4♠ or K♥ K♦ K♠ K♣. A run consists of at least three consecutive cards of the same suit, as with J♣ Q♣ K♣ or 4♥ 5♥ 6♥ 7♥. Very few variations allow runs that have mixed suits. In a few variations of rummy, other patterns may be allowed. In some variations the melds (sets and runs) must be 3 or 4 cards, while other variations allow larger melds through the use of longer runs, for example: 8♠ 9♠ 10♠ J♠ Q♠ or, if multiple decks or wild cards are used, 5♦ 5♣ 5♥ 5♠ J or Q♥ Q♦ Q♣ J. Wild cards (such as a joker) may be used to represent any card in a meld. The number of wild cards in a meld may be restricted.

=== Play ===
Depending on the variation of the game, players take turns adding and shedding cards from their hands. There are numerous and quite different ways of doing this though it usually involves picking a card from the stock and discarding a card to the discard pile. In some variations melds are revealed to all players by placing them face up on the table, in other variations players keep their hands hidden until the show. Some variations permit picking up the entire discard pile. A few variations permit stealing cards from their opponents melds.

=== Show ===
In most variations players must put all their cards into at least two melds (though they may be allowed to shed one card to the discard pile before showing). A player who has melded all cards reveals those still held and submits them for validation. All other players reveal their melds and deadweight. The action of submitting the cards is called Showing.

=== Scoring ===
After a successful show, the winner or all players score their hands. In most variations numbered cards have certain assigned points and the royal cards (J-Q-K) have assigned points and the A often has a different point value. Scoring often involves each player adding up points in their melded cards (sets and runs) and deducting points from cards that have not been melded. The winner may also receive a bonus for winning. Some special or difficult melds may also give extra points to a hand. A player may have a negative score if unmelded cards total more than melded ones. Usually play continues until one player passes a threshold, for example 1,000 points.

== Basic rummy ==
There are many variations of Rummy, but most build on a common set of features found in the basic game, called Basic Rummy or Straight Rummy. The following rules follow Parlett (2008) unless otherwise stated.

=== Cards ===
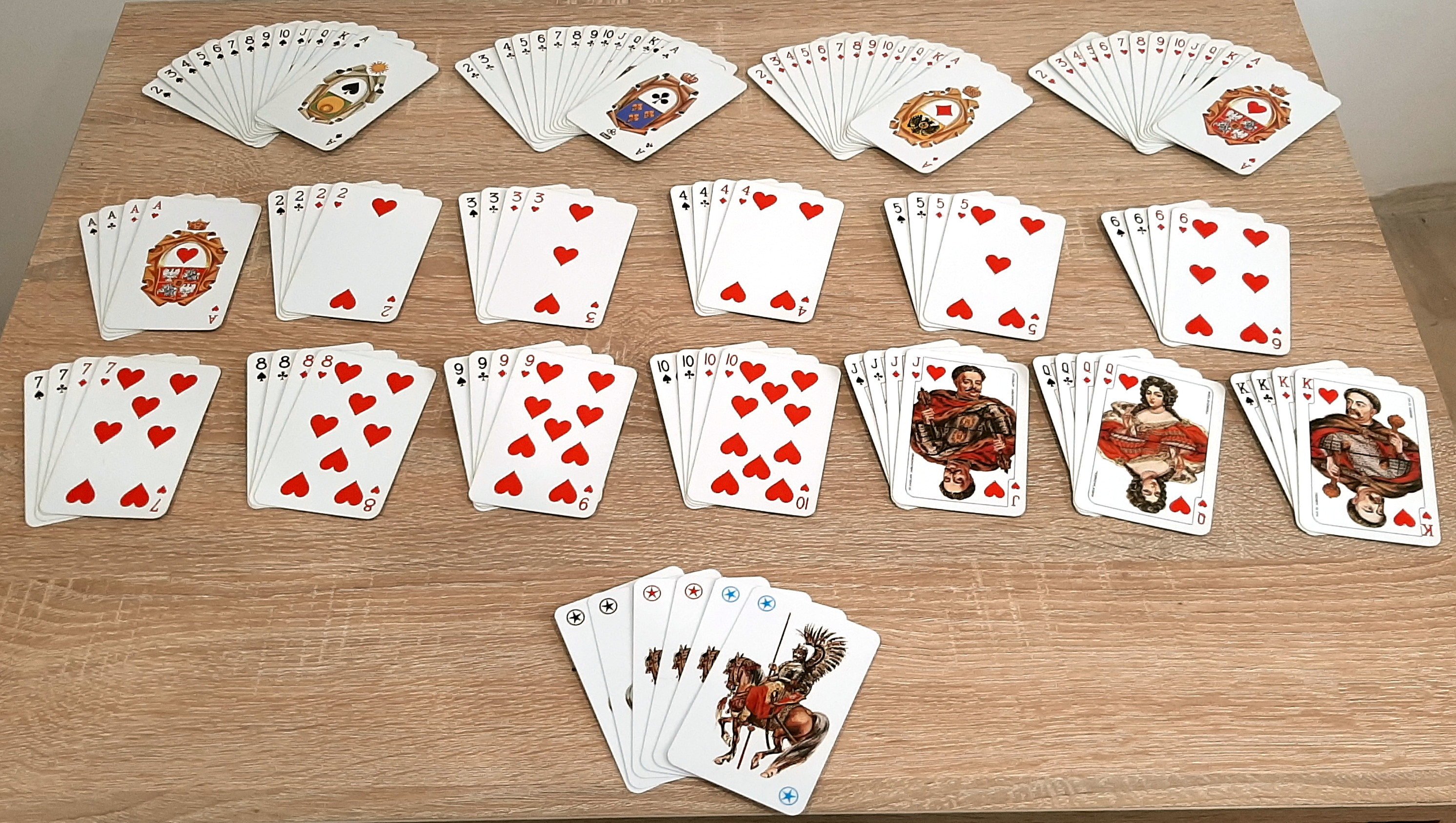
A twin Rummy deck with six jokers

Standard packs of 52 cards are used: one is sufficient for two or three players; four to seven may use a twin pack, which may have two different patterns on the card backs. Alternatively four to six players may play with a single pack, but with a reduced number of cards. Recently, double packs of 104 German-suited cards have been produced for the first time in centuries. Jokers are wild.

=== Deal ===
The first dealer may be chosen by lot. Deal and play are clockwise. The dealer shuffles the pack well and player on the dealer's right may cut. Up to seven may play and receive 10 cards each, provided there are two packs available if four or more play. The cards dealt are summarised in the table below:

Number of players	One pack	Two packs
2 players	10 cards	–
3 players	7 or 10 cards	10 cards
4 or 5 players	7 cards	10 cards
6 players	6 cards	10 cards
7 players	–	10 cards

Starting with eldest hand, (Note: The player to the dealer's left.) cards are dealt clockwise, face down, one at a time. The dealer then turns the next card to start the discard pile and places the rest of the pack, face down, between the players as the stock.

=== Play ===
Play begins with the player on the dealer's left and proceeds clockwise. In turn, each player draws the top card from the stock or the discard pile. If drawing from the discard pile a player may draw multiple cards. The player will then do either or both of the following:

- Meld. A player who has three cards of the same suit in a sequence or run, may meld them by laying these cards, face up, on the table. If at least three cards of the same rank are held, they may be melded as a set or group. Originally Aces could only be played low (A♥ 2♥ 3♥) however it is now common to treat them as high or low, but not both. For example, Q♥ K♥ A♥ is legal but Q♥ K♥ A♥ 2♥ is not. Melding is optional and there is no limit to the number of melds that can be made in one turn.
- Lay off. Once a player has melded at least once, from their next turn they may also choose to lay off some cards on an existing meld. This means that a player may add to a sequence or a set on the table, regardless of who initially melded it.

Finally, after making any melds or lay offs, the player must discard a single card to the discard pile, face up. The following player then picks up either the face-down card or the face-up card.

If the stock runs out, the next player may choose to draw from the discard pile or to turn it over to form a new stock. The discard pile is not shuffled. After forming the new stock, the top card is drawn to form the new discard pile. The player can call rummy if a point is discarded into the discard pile.

During a player's turn, any other player may shout out "borrow that" to take the face-up card, immediately placing it into their own hand. They may only do so once per any player's turn. If a player unintentionally says "borrow that" (even in passing), they must pick up the face-up card.

Going out. A player may go out by emptying their hand whether as part of a meld, a lay-off or a discard. If a point that is playable is discarded in attempt to "go out" said discard would be "rummy". Although when a person's last card is put down the game is immediately over regardless of what said card could play as. Other common rules require that the final card in a player's hand be discarded, meaning that a player cannot go out by melding or laying off, but must discard the final card.

Example. Anne has 7♦ 8♦ left in her hand and draws 9♦, thus forming a sequence. She goes out by melding her sequence and without making a discard. Or supposing Ben has 3♣ 4♣ K♠ and draws the 5♣, he may meld the 3♣ 4♣ 5♣, discard the K♠ and go out. Or if there is a run of 8♥ 9♥ 10♥ on the table and Charlotte, who has the Q♥, picks up the J♥, she may lay off her two cards to the existing meld and go out.

=== Scoring ===
The player who goes out, wins, and scores as many points as the other have in their hand cards. Court cards score 10 each, Jokers 15 each and numerals score their face value. Aces count as 1 unless they are allowed to be high, in which case they score 11.

== Variations ==
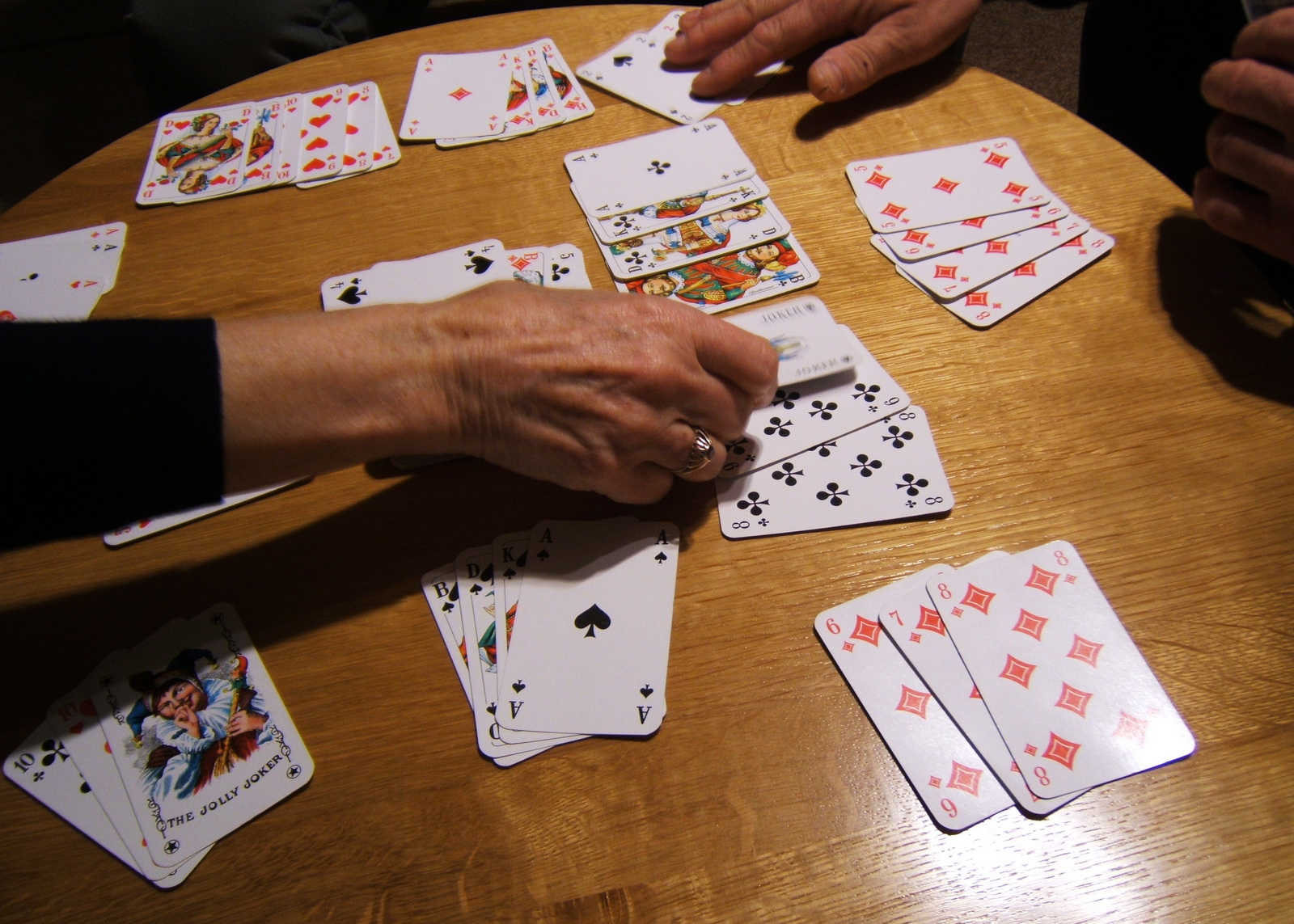
Melding with a joker

In some instances, jokers are used as wildcards and can represent any card value when melding. They can be used in sets or runs but cannot be replaced when 'melded', nor can a player lay off a card to replace it by themselves or their opponent. Jokers are not counted during the scoring.

In other variations, such as rummy 500 and treppenrommé, discards are placed so that all the cards are visible. At the beginning of the turn, a player may take any card from the discard pile, so long as all the cards on top of it are also picked up, and the last card picked up is played immediately. If only picking up the top card, the player must keep it and discard a different card.

In a variation called block or tile rummy, players do not continue after going through the pack once – if no players are out, they all lose the points in their hands after the pack has been gone through once. Round the corner rummy, also called continuity rummy, is a variant where an ace may be simultaneously high and low to "wrap around" in a run, as in the following meld: Q-K-A-2.

== Related games ==
There are a large number of games derived from rummy. Although in North America the word rummy is often used interchangeably for gin rummy, the term is applicable to a large family of games, including canasta, mahjong and Rummikub.

=== Melding family ===
The most basic form where play continues until the stock is exhausted or a player achieves a specific number of points. Different cards (and melds in some games) are worth specific points. In some variations, the first meld must meet minimum point requirements or the final meld must include a discard. Some of these are played for four players in partnerships of two. In most variations, players may extensively add to or even rearrange their cards.

- 500 Rum
- 5000 Rum
- Bing rummy
- Continental
- Cuajo
- Desmoche
- German Rummy
- Indian Marriage
- Indonesian rummy (remi)
- Machiavelli
- Marriage
- Red three rummy
- Panguingue
- Penang rummy
- Scala 40
- Seven bridge
- Shanghai rum
- Speed Rummy
- Three thirteen
- Tong-its
- Treppenrommé

=== Contract family ===
In contract rummy, players are either assigned specific objectives (known or unknown to the other players) or decide their own objectives and announces them before play begins. Players are awarded and or penalized extra points depending on if they successfully meet their objectives.

- Contract rummy
- Kalooki
- Dummy rummy
- Carioca
- Phase 10
- Liverpool rummy
- Zioncheck

=== Shedding games ===
In these games, players play until they have a minimal number of points or cards in their unmelded hands.

- Conquian
- Robbers' rummy

=== Canasta family ===
Canasta games usually involve partnerships using two or more decks with many wild cards. There are many rules and restrictions on first melds, final melds and taking the deck. Seven or eight of a kinds (canasta) score high.

- Buraco
- Biriba
- Canasta
- Hand & Foot
- Samba
- Mille

=== Knock rummy ===
In knock rummy, players usually reveal their entire hand at the end of the game. In most variations, a player may signal (through knock or a specific kind of discard) that they have a valid hand. In some variations, the other players get one final turn before the reveal.

- Gin rummy
- Indian Rummy
- Rumino
- Tonk (aka Tunk)
- Viennese Rummy

== Variations with non-Western cards or special equipment ==
=== Rummoli games ===
Rummoli games use Western cards, but require a special board or modified table with various squares with specific cards drawn on them. In each round, players put tokens in the squares. If a player lays down a card matching a square, they collect the tokens therein. Most versions allow multiple players to meld straights in sequence and do not use three- or four-of-a-kinds. Some versions include poker-like elements.

- Pope Joan
- Michigan
- Poch
- Rummoli
- Three In One
- Tripoli or TRIPOLEY (a trademarked version)
- Michigan Rummy
- Royal Rummy

=== Unique cards ===
Several companies produce special card sets which often include special cards not seen in other rummoli variations. Some variations resemble the card game Crazy Eights. Most of these games are suitable for children and Safari Pals is an educational game.

- Phase 10
- Ruckus
- Safari Pals

=== Chinese cards ===
There are two different kinds of Chinese decks used for rummy-like games. The rules of each variation vary greatly.

- Khanhoo
- Quan dui
- Four Color Cards

=== Tiles ===
Tile rummy games usually include tiles of only three suits along with special tiles unseen in card games. Mahjong, a game with elaborate rules and different scoring systems, is played in East Asia with numerous variations played in different countries. Rummikub and other international tile variations have rules similar to meld and knock rummy.

- Domino rummy
- Mahjong
- Okey
- Rummikub
