= Liverpool rummy =

Card game

Liverpool Rummy
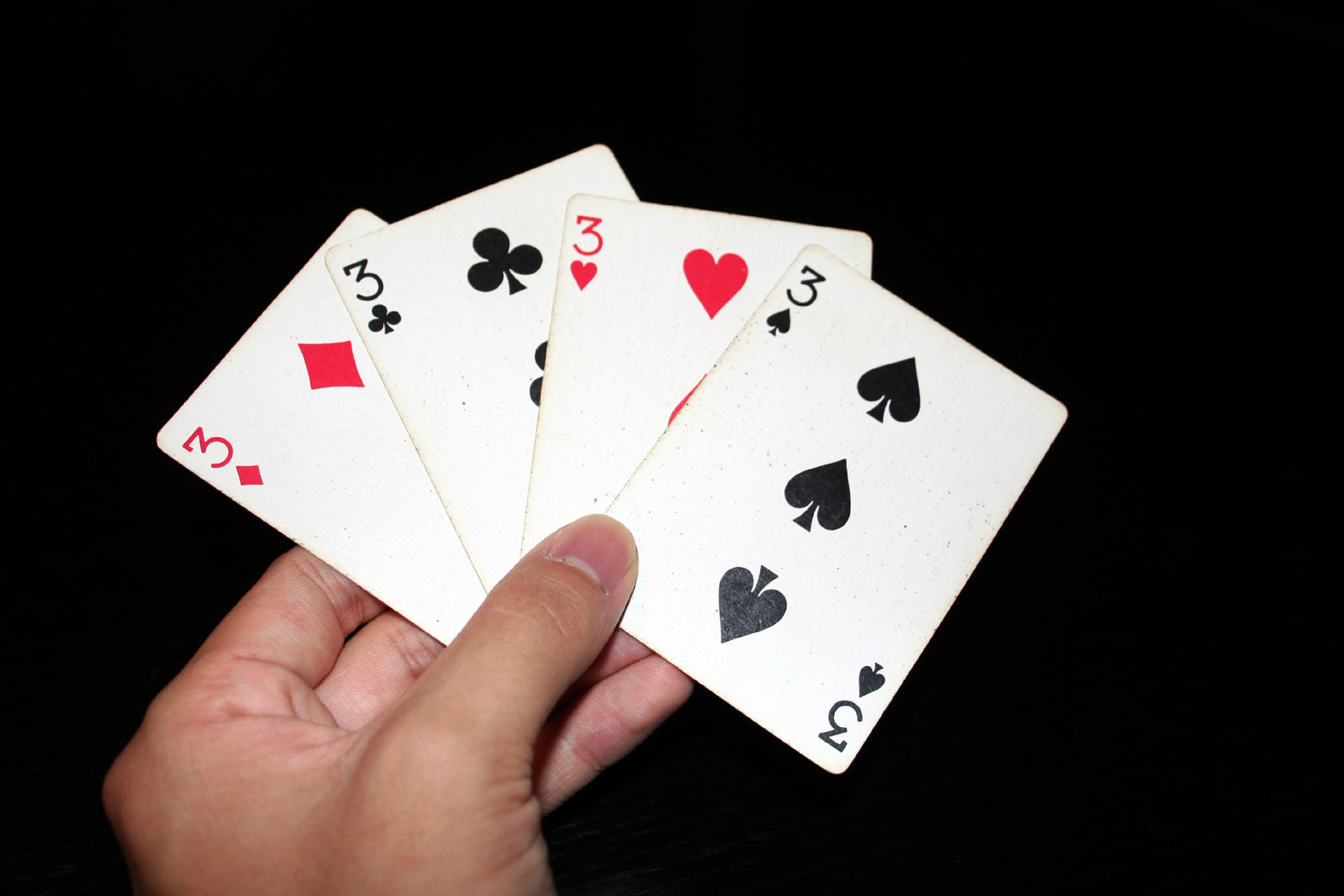
- Origin: United States
- Type: Matching
- Family: Going out
- Players: 3-8
- Skills: Strategy
- Cards: 52 cards (104-156)
- Deck: French
- Play: Clockwise
- Playing time: 20-30 min.
- Chance: Easy

Related games
- Canasta

Liverpool rummy is a multi-player, multi-round card game similar to other variants of rummy that adds features like buying and going out. It is played the same as Contract rummy, except that if a player manages to cut the exact number of cards required to deal the hand and leave a face-up card, then the cutting player's score is reduced by 50 points.

== Overview ==
The game consists of seven deals of the cards. The objective is to be holding the lowest valued cards at the end of each deal. At the end of each deal the score for each player is written down, and the player with the lowest total score at the end of the seven deals wins the game.

In each deal, the players reduce the value of the cards held in their hands by laying on the table, melds comprising sets and sequences of cards, usually known as Books and Runs.

- A Book consists of three or more cards of the same rank, such as 8♥ 8♣ 8♠.
- A Run consists of four or more cards in sequence, all of the same suit (hearts, clubs, etc), such as 3♥ 4♥ 5♥ 6♥ 7♥.

== Cards ==
The game is played with standard 52-card packs plus the Jokers: 2 packs for three or four players or 3 for more than four players. The ranking from low-to-high is 2-3-4-5-6-7-8-9-10-J-Q-K-A. Aces can be high or low (see section on card play where aces can be used in a high run or low run but not wrap around). Jokers are wild.

== Dealing ==
The dealer deals 10 cards to each player for the first 4 rounds, then 12 cards to each player for the last 3 rounds. After all the players' hands have been dealt, the rest are placed face down as the stock and its top card turned face-up to start the discard pile.

The player to the immediate left of the dealer plays first.

== Play ==
On each turn, a player may:

- Allow any player to buy the top card from the discard pile.
- Draw either the face-up top card of the discard pile or one card from the stock.
- Meld their completed round-appropriate collection of books and runs.
- Play off other players who have laid down once they have laid down themselves.
- Discard one card from their hand onto the discard pile. When a player discards a card that could have been played off on their own or another player's laid cards is a "Liverpool". Only players that are laid down may call Liverpool. The first player to call Liverpool may discard one card to the discard pile, resume rotation prior caller. If the next player commences their turn by either drawing or allowing buying then the opportunity to call Liverpool has passed.

Play continues, in alternating turns, until one player goes out, or has no cards left in their hand. Points are tallied and recorded by a score-keeper. All of the cards are shuffled and the next round of play commences.

=== Laying down ===
The objective in Liverpool rummy is to improve one's score by laying down to reduce the number of cards in hand, and eventually going out before other players. Within each round there are two types of card groupings that are required:

Books
3 or more cards sharing the same rank, i.e., 8♥ 8♣ 8♠.
Runs
4 or more cards of the same suit in sequence, i.e., 3♥ 4♥ 5♥ 6♥.

Aces rank as high or low, but one cannot create a run that loops around, also known as "turning the corner". A 2 3 4 is allowed, J Q K A is allowed, but K A 2 3 is not.

If a player begins to meld and finds they cannot actually meld, they must add fifty points to their score.

==== Requirements for laying down ====
The requirements for each round of play are as follows:

- First - 2 books of three (6 cards)
- Second - 1 book of three & 1 run of four (7 cards)
- Third - 2 runs of four (8 cards)
- Fourth - 3 books of three (9 cards)
- Fifth - 2 books of three & 1 run of four (10 cards)
- Sixth - 1 book of three & 2 runs of four (11 cards)
- Seventh - 1 run of seven

=== Buying cards ===
After each player has finished their turn by discarding, if the next player should decline to pick up the new top card of the face-up discard pile, any other player may "buy" it. The "price" to pick up this extra card out of turn requires that the buyer draw an additional card from the face-down pile. If more than one player desires to buy a card, the player who first calls out "I'll buy that" gets the card. Or, for a calmer game, whoever is nearest (clockwise) to the player about to draw gets precedence.

The option to buy ends when the next player picks up a card from the top of the face-down deck.

=== Wild cards ===
Jokers are wild cards, and can represent any card (suit and number). However there are restrictions on their usage.

- Books must include at least 2 non-wildcards. (Example: 7♥ 7♣ Jkr.)
- Runs must include at least 3 non-wildcards in an original 4 card grouping. (Example: 7♥ 8♥ Jkr 10♥)

During their turn while playing off another player, a player may replace that other player's laid Joker from within a run with the card it is substituting, so long as that Joker is placed somewhere else before the player concludes their turn. An easy way for a player to "waste" the extra Joker if it doesn't allow them to lay additional cards is to simply add it to a set, as this prohibits another player from performing the wild card substitution trick again.

=== Playing off other players ===
Once a player has laid down, they can then attempt to further reduce the number of cards in their hand by adding to other players' laid cards.

For example, a 3♥ could be added to an existing set of 3s (3♦ 3♣ 3♠) or a suitable a run of hearts (4♥ 5♥ 6♥ 7♥) from another player.

No player can interact with jokers after the turn in which they go down. There is only one round in which you can swap out jokers with cards, that is the turn you are actively going down. Not any round before or after—-even if you have the card to do so, (after you’re down) for you it is a dead card in which you can either hold or drop (to get rid of points or) for someone else to buy or pick up. (Before you’re down) wait until you can go down-with or without the joker in question that you need, and then go down. But be careful if there are multiple decks as someone else could have the card and swap it before you’re ready.

=== Calling rummy ===
Once a player has laid down, their discard must not fit into either their own or any other player's laid cards. If this is the case, every other player has until the commencement of the next player's turn to call rummy on the offending player, in which case that offending player picks up their discard and one additional card from the top of the deck. Once a player lays their cards down to 'go out' of a round, rummy rules no longer apply.

=== Evaluation of the hand ===
At the end of each round when a player goes out, the rest of the players total their scores by counting up the value of the cards remaining in their hands. Cards are valued as follows:

- 2 through 9 are 5 points each.
- 10, J, Q and K are 10 points each.
- Aces & Jokers are 15 points each.

The player with the lowest point total at the end of final round wins, so players usually work to lower their scores by going down, playing off other players who have gone down and, secondarily, replacing high cards (such as face cards and aces) with lower ones.

==== Going out ====
A player goes out when they successfully discard the only remaining card in hand, marking the conclusion of the step for all players. A player gets to this point by laying down and then playing off their and other players’ hands.

A player is floating if they exhaust their cards and are not able to discard. In this case, the hand continues until somebody successfully goes out. At no point in time is it acceptable to draw a card from the up pile and discard the same card during the same turn. It follows that a floater must draw an unplayable card from the deck (down-pile) in order to go out. When floating, a player may also play off of someone, meaning they can add on to a run or set owned by another player by simply laying the cards they want to play in front of them.

It is customary for a player to knock on the table when there is only one card left in their hand, alerting other players to the fact that they are close to going out.

== Variants ==
In the "Me" variant, a player may buy a card out of turn from the discard pile by calling "me" or "I'll buy that". They pick up the discarded (bought) card and a penalty (the price for buying the card). The difference from Liverpool Rummy is that whoever calls "me" first gets the card as opposed to the player who is nearest (clockwise) the player about to draw.

== See also ==
- Rummy
- Canasta
- Tonk
- Phase 10
