= Treppenrommé =

Card game

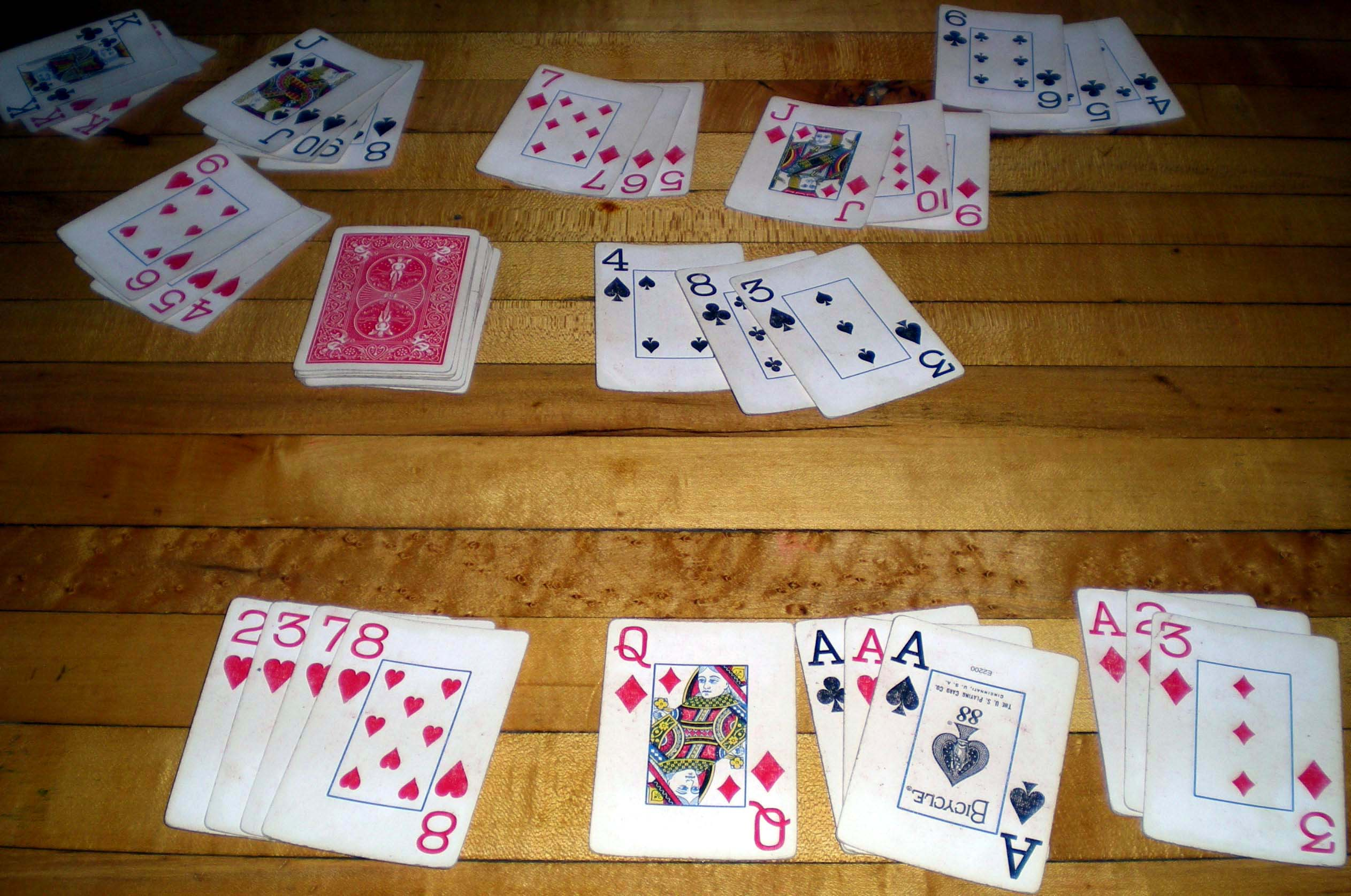
- A game in progress.
- Origin: Germany
- Type: Matching
- Players: 2-4
- Cards: 52
- Deck: French
- Rank (high→low): A K Q J 10 9 8 7 6 5 4 3 2 (A)
- Play: Clockwise
- Playing time: 15 min.
- Chance: Medium

Related games
- Rummy • 500 Rum

Treppenrommé is a card game for two to four players, which is a variant of Rummy played in Germany and Austria. The name means "Staircase Rummy" and comes from the fact that the discard pile must be arranged such that every card is partly covered and partly visible, forming a so-called 'staircase' (Treppe). The game appears to be closely related to 500 Rum, but there are several differences.

== General ==
In Treppenrommé the aim is to win the game by collecting the most points through melding as many high-scoring combinations of cards as possible.

== Cards ==
The game uses a standard French pack of 52 cards with the suits of Spades (Pik), Clubs (Kreuz), Hearts (Herz) and Diamonds (Karo). Within each suit the cards rank as follows: Ace, King (König), Queen (Dame), Jack (Bube), 10, 9, 8, 7, 6, 5, 4, 3, 2. In combinations the Ace may be high or low and also may turn the corner e.g. Q, K, A, 2, 3 etc.

== Combinations ==
Players may form combinations of cards either in sets or sequences. A set (Satz) consists of 3 or 4 cards of equal rank and different suits, e. g. ♥7 ♣7 ♦7. A sequence (Folge) consists of three or more cards of the same suit in unbroken succession, e.g. ♥J ♥Q ♥K ♥A ♥2 ♥3, etc. The cards 2 to 10 have corresponding values of 2 to 10 points. The Jack, Queen and King each count as 10 points. In a set, the Aces count as 15 points; in a sequence as the highest card, 10 points; as a middle card (used to 'turn the corner'), 5 points; as the lowest card, 1 point.

Examples:

6-6-6-6 = 24 points

A-A-A = 45 points

Q-K-A = 30 points

Q-K-A-2 = 27 points

A-2-3 = 6 points

5-6-7-8-9 = 35 points

== Deal ==
Deal and play are clockwise. The first dealer, who may be chosen by lot, shuffles the pack and deals 7 cards each. The remaining cards are placed face down as a talon in the middle of the table. The top card of the talon is then turned and placed, face up, next to the talon.

== Play ==
The dealer, unusually, begins by taking a talon card or the upcard next to the talon. This is added it to the hand cards of the dealer who then discards an unwanted card, face up, next to the talon. The next player does the same and so on. Because the upcard always has to be placed so that each card only half covers the previous one, a straight-line fan of cards or 'staircase' is formed, whose cards are always visible. Whoever's turn it is may either pick up the topmost card of the talon or as many staircase cards as wanted. Players may not pick up both from the talon and staircase in the same turn and may not select a card or cards from the middle of the staircase. For example, the staircase consists of Q-9-2-A-7 (7 on top) and Ann wants the 9. She must also pick up the cards on top of the 9, i.e. the 7, A and 2, so that only the Queen is left on the staircase. Players must therefore weigh up whether it is worth picking up several cards in order to obtain just one or two. The game often ends quickly when a player is left with too many hand cards. It may be advantageous, however, to pick up a lot of staircase cards, because the number of possible combinations in one's hand increases significantly.

== Combinations ==
A player, in turn, may meld a combination, by placing it face up on the table. The value of the combinations placed is noted immediately by the recorder (Schriftführer). Furthermore, the same player may put hand cards on any of the combinations on the table including the opponent's, the individual value of which is also written down immediately. For example, Bob melds the following combinations: 6-6-6 (18), D-K-A-2-3 (30). He also adds to combinations that have already been played: B, 7, 10 (27). The recorder notes for him: 18+30+27=75 points. Then Bob places a discard on the staircase, and it is the next player's turn.

== Settlement ==
As soon as a player has no hand cards left, the game is over. It does not matter whether the final card is put on the staircase or melded. The first player to go out in this way also scores the points that the opponent or opponents still have left in their hands. An Ace left in the hand always scores 15, but if a player goes out without having melded or laid off (i.e. has a Rommé hand), the opponent's hand cards score double to the winner. But any cards held that are melded or laid off at the end, count as normal. The overall winner of a session is the player who achieves an agreed number of points - for example 500 or 1000 - after several games.

== Differences from 500 Rum ==
The main differences from 500 Rum are that in Treppenrommé:

- Only 7 cards are dealt.
- The dealer goes first.
- When several cards are drawn from the discard pile, the bottom one need not be melded. Indeed, none need be melded.
- Aces score 15 in a set. In a sequence they score 10 when high, 1 when low and 5 when turning the corner.
- There are no Jokers.

== Literature ==
- _ (1958) Erweitertes Spielregel-Büchlein aus Altenburg], 1st edn., Altenburg: Altenburger Spielkartenfabrik, 74 Skatstadt, EVP 1,- M, pp. 272–275
- _ (1988). Erweitertes Spielregel-Büchlein aus Altenburg, 8th edn., Altenburg: Altenburger Spielkartenfabrik, pp. 202–204.
- Parlett, David (2008). The Penguin Book of Card Games. Penguin: London. ISBN 978-0-141-03787-5
