= Three thirteen =

Card game

3/13
- Card Game
- Origin: United States
- Family: Matching
- Players: 2+
- Skills: Strategy
- Cards: 104 cards
- Deck: Anglo-American
- Play: Clockwise
- Playing time: Between 20 min. and 2 hours, depending on the number of players
- Chance: Easy

Related games
- Contract rummy

Three thirteen is a variation of the card game Rummy. It is an eleven-round game played with two or more players. It requires two decks of cards with the jokers removed. Like other Rummy games, once the hands are dealt, the remainder of the cards are placed face down on the table. The top card from the deck is flipped face up and put beside the deck to start the discard pile.

== Rules ==
Each player attempts to combine all of the cards in their hand into one or more sets.

A set may be either:

- Three or more cards of the same rank, such as 7♥ 7♠ 7♣, a pair or more with a wild card, or a single card with two wild cards
- A sequence of three or more cards of the same suit, such as 4♥ 5♥ 6♥ 7♥ using a wild card or cards to fill in where necessary to form the sequence, and the wild card(s) do not need to be in the suit.

(cards of the same suit but not in sequence do not count as a set) Sets can contain more than three cards, however, the same card cannot be included in multiple sets.

Once a player has combined all of their cards into sets, they "go out". Their sets must stay valid after discarding the card required at the end of their turn. Once the first player is "out", all other players are allowed 1 extra turn (in order) to either improve their hand to reduce their score, or in some cases also become "out" (i.e., scoring 0 points).

The winner of a game of "Three thirteen" is the player who, at the end of the final round, has accumulated the fewest points.

=== Dealing ===
The first dealer, chosen at random, deals three cards to each player. In each successive round, the deal passes to the left. In the second round, the dealer deals four cards to each player. With each successive round, the number of cards dealt to start the round increases until the eleventh and final round in which thirteen cards each are dealt.

=== Playing ===
The player to dealer's left is the first to play, and the play moves clockwise. When it is a player's turn, they must choose to draw either the top card from the discard pile, or the top card from the top of the deck. They may then organize their hand to create card sets, or get as close as they can. To end their turn, the player must discard one card from their hand, and place it on top of the discard pile.

=== Wild cards ===
In each round there is a designated wild card. The wild card is the card equal to the number of cards dealt. In the first round, three cards are dealt, so Threes are wild cards. In the second round four cards are dealt, so Fours are wild cards. When 11, 12, and 13 cards are dealt, the Jacks, Queens, and Kings are the respective wild cards. Wild cards can be used in place of any other card in making a group or sequence. A player may use more than one wild card in any set including a set made up of only wild cards.

=== Scoring ===
At the end of a given round, each of a player's cards that cannot be placed into a set counts towards their score.

Card	Point Value
Ace	1
Two	2
Three	3
Four	4
Five	5
Six	6
Seven	7
Eight	8
Nine	9
Ten	10
Jack	11
Queen	12
King	13

=== Variations ===
- Some rules designate Jokers as additional wild cards. In that case, a joker left in a player's hand at the conclusion of a round counts as 20 points.
- Some versions make the ace 13, 15, or 20 points.
- According to some rules, Aces can be used as high or low in a sequence. In this case an Ace remaining in your hand at the end costs 15 points, rather than one.
- Some rules score only 10 points for Jacks, Queens and Kings.
- An extra round (twelfth) or two (thirteenth) where there are 14 and 15 cards dealt for each player and Aces and 2s are wild respectively. Some call it "Fourteens" or "Fifteens".
- In other variations, Jokers as wild cards can be discarded onto any pile of any other player and count for no points.
- Another variation plays 22 rounds starting from 3 to 13 and then back down from 13 to 3
- A rule variation is that each player places the discard card in front of that player. Other players then have the choice to pick from the various discard piles. This makes the game move much faster.
- In games with a "Redemption round", after a player goes out, the other players get one last play and can lay down any melds on their own table or deadwood cards on other players' tables. If it is possible to get rid of all one's cards in the redemption round, the player will receive 0 points.
- Points are doubled on the 11th (Jacks), 12th (Queens), and 13th (Kings) round.
- Some rules state that a player can make a set that consists only of wild cards.
- Some play that if a player goes out incorrectly, this is counted as +20 points.
- Double-naughts: A rule where if each player goes out with zero points on a given hand, the hand is replayed as if it never happened.
- Some variations allow for a fixed negative score for the first player to go out each round. Common point values include -5, -10, or a negative value equal to the wild card. (-8 points if the 8 card is wild)
- A variant known as "3-to-the-King" makes the King cards wild for all rounds of the game, in addition to the wild cards tied to the number of cards dealt that round

== See also ==
- Dummy rummy
- Bing rummy
- Five Crowns (card game)
