= Indian Rummy =

Indian card game

Indian Cherokee Rummy (or Paplu) is a card game in India with little variation from original Rummy. It may be considered a cross between Rummy 500 and Gin Rummy. Indian Rummy is a variant of the Rummy game popular in India that involves making valid sets out of 13 cards that are distributed among every player on the table. Each player is dealt 13 cards initially; if the number of players is 2, then a 52 cards deck is chosen for the game and if there are 6 players, two decks of 52 cards each are combined for the game. Each player has to draw and discard cards by turns till one player melds their cards with valid sets that meet the Rummy validation rules. It could be that Indian Rummy evolved from a version of Rummy in South Asia, Celebes Rummy, also called Rhuk.

Two kinds of sets are possible: a run of consecutive suited cards, and three or four of a kind (with no duplicate suits.) The basic requirement for winning a hand is at least two sequences, one of which must be "pure", i.e., made without any jokers.

== Origin ==
The Mughals enjoyed a game called Ganjifa, which led to the introduction of card games in the 16th century. It was first developed as a court game with a lavish deck of playing cards composed of priceless materials and gems. Today, Indian Rummy is a card-melding game popular in the Indian sub-continent.

== Rules ==
Indian Rummy is similar to the standard Rummy the only difference being the number of card dealt: a set of 13 cards is dealt to each player.

It is a game of 2-6 players. For 2 players, 2 decks of cards are used. For more than 2 players, the game makes use of 3 decks. Each player gets 13 cards in the beginning; which they have to meld into valid sequences and/or sets. 5, 6, 7 of same suit, is an example of a sequence or run and 7, 7, 7 of different suit is a set.

It is a draw and discard based game, wherein each player picks a card from the open pile or the closed deck upon their turn and discards a card to the open pile. Indian Rummy also makes use of joker cards. These cards can be used as substitutes for any card to form combinations.

Each card holds specific points. Number cards carry points equal to their face value. Face cards, namely Jacks, Queens, Kings, and Aces hold 10 points each. Jokers are worth zero points. As players meld their cards, their point score decreases. The player who achieves zero points first of all, wins the game.

The player who forms valid runs and/or sets before all other players is the winner. The rules of the game say that there must be at least two runs, and one of them must be pure, i.e., it does not contain any joker. To exemplify, 8, 9, 10 of same suit of card is a pure run, while 8, 9, Joker is an impure run. Players can meld their remaining cards into either sets or runs.

Each player picks a card from the closed/open deck and discards a card to the open deck. The game play goes on in an anti-clockwise manner until the winner completes required sets & sequences. The basic 13-card strategy is to make valid sequences and sets before one's opponents.

Once either player discards a card in the discard stack face down, the game will end. The players needs to arrange the cards and then place them on the table to show their hands to other players. If the players hand meets the objective, they are declared the winner. If not, all opponents are declared as winners and the player ended the game will be declared as loser.

At the conclusion of the hand, the unmade points held by the losing players are added up. Scoring is generally rounded off to the nearest five (for example, 62 points becomes 60). If the hand value of a losing player exceeds 80, a score of 80 is entered (for example, 91 points would be counted as 80)

The three most popular Indian Rummy variants that follow a similar pattern of play, based on the draw and discard of cards are:

- Points Rummy: Games in which the monetary value associated with each point is preset at the beginning. The player who finishes first wins the amount as: (sum of points of all opponents) x (monetary value of 1 point). It is the most basic and the quickest version of Indian Rummy. New players find it easier to learn and play Points Rummy.
- Deals Rummy: Games in which the number of deals (game rounds) is preset at the beginning. The player with the minimum points at the end of all the deals is the winner of the game. Generally, the number of deals is 2 or 3. It is similar to playing Points Rummy for a fixed number of times. Hence, it takes longer to finish a Deals Rummy game.
- Pool Rummy: Games in which the upper limit (101/201) for the points is preset at the beginning. The player who remains till the end, after all the other players have been eliminated on crossing the preset limit, is the winner. It is the longest format of Indian Rummy. It is similar to playing Points Rummy again and again till all the players, except one, collect 101/201 points and have to exit the game.

=== Jokers ===
In addition to the standard jokers in the deck, one player selects a card out of the stock. It is called a wild card joker. There is a total of 5 Joker cards, of which 4 Jokers can be used by players in the game. One Joker lies turned up cross under the closed deck so that all players can see it. This card determines an additional set of jokers for that hand in the following manner:

- The same rank regardless of the color.
- The next higher card of the same suit is called a "Paplu". This card functions as a joker, but the holder is awarded an additional bonus from each player at the conclusion of the round. Generally, this is 10 points from each player (25 points if two Paplus are held).
- If the selected card turns out to be a printed joker, all 2 card become the joker for that particular Rummy game.
- Some other terminologies that you may hear apart from Paplu include Nichlu and Upplu. Though these words might be fun to speak, they represent a set of rules involving wild card Jokers.

== Legal status ==
Rummy has been declared by the courts of law to be a game of skill or mere skill. Such games are excluded from the applicability of laws prohibiting betting and gambling ('Betting and Gambling' being a state subject under the Constitution of India) in all states to the exception of a few. However, the states of Assam and Orissa have not provided clear rulings on this matter and are thus ambiguous territories. Playing Rummy online is also legal in India.

Rummy is legally recognized as a game of skill in India. In the landmark judgment State of Andhra Pradesh v. K. Satyanarayana (1967), the Supreme Court ruled that Rummy is "mainly and preponderantly a game of skill" and not pure chance, exempting it from gambling prohibitions under laws like the Public Gambling Act, 1867.

This legal distinction has been upheld in subsequent rulings. For instance, the Madras High Court allowed online rummy and poker, recognizing them as games of skill. Similarly, the Kerala High Court struck down a state-imposed ban on online rummy, affirming its legality.

However, the legal status of online rummy varies across Indian states. States like Telangana and Andhra Pradesh have enacted laws banning online rummy for stakes, citing concerns over addiction and financial loss. These state-specific laws have been challenged in courts, leading to ongoing legal developments.

In most parts of India, playing rummy for real money is considered legal, provided it does not amount to gambling under applicable state laws.
