= Marriage (card game) =

Nepalese Matching card game

- Rummy
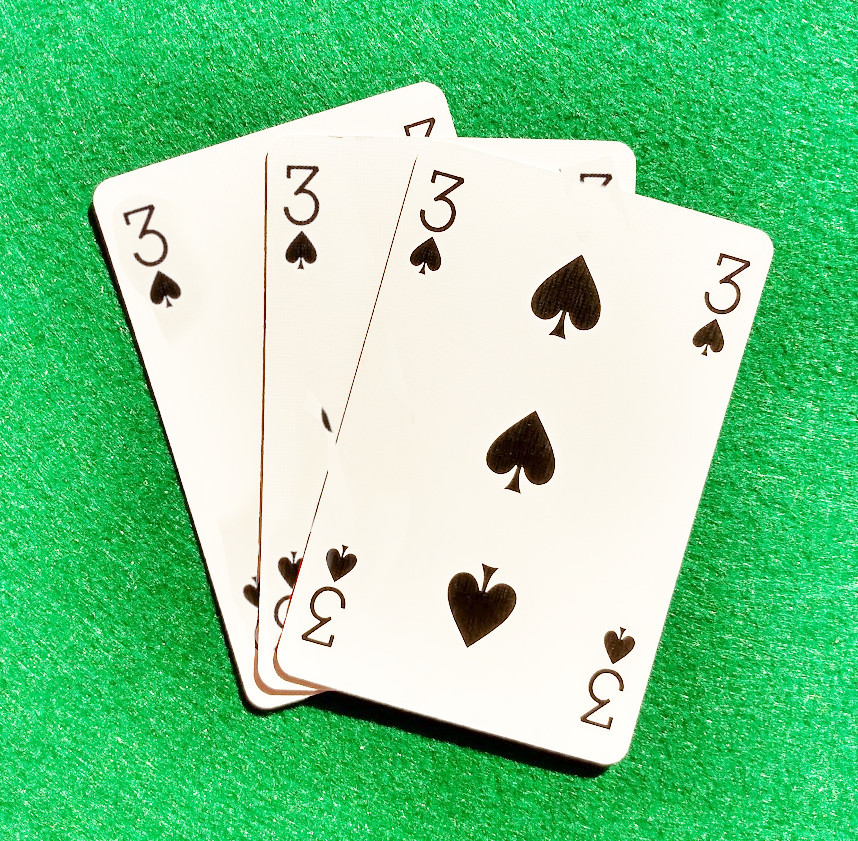
- Three cards of the same suit and rank are a tunnel
- Origin: Nepal
- Type: Rummy
- Players: 2 to 5
- Skills: Memory, Attention
- Age range: All but gambling is not legal in Nepal
- Cards: 3 decks of 52 cards (total: 156)
- Deck: Standard
- Rank (high→low): A K Q J 10 9 8 7 6 5 4 3 2
- Play: Anti-clockwise
- Playing time: Depends on players
- Chance: Easy

Marriage is a matching card game played with three decks of cards in Nepal, Bhutan, Banthara and by the Nepali diaspora. It is based on making sets of three matching cards of the same rank (trials), the same rank and suit (tunnels), or three consecutive cards of the same suit (sequences). Each player is dealt 21 cards (a fixed rule, not derived from the total number of cards), and the remaining cards form the stock pile.

== Play ==
The game uses three standard 52-card decks. Jokers are optional; if jokers are included, they are wildcards. Play consists of five stages:

1. Dealing
2. Primary ("pure") sets
3. Secondary sets ("dirty rounds")
4. Ending
5. Scoring

The overall objective of the game is to arrange all twenty-one cards into sets. The first objective is to make three pure sets. Creating a set of seven pairs (two cards of the same rank and suit) also counts as meeting this objective. The second objective is to end the game. The final objective of the game is to score the highest number of points.

=== Dealing ===
The dealer shuffles three standard 52‑card decks together, totalling 156 cards. The dealer deals 21 cards counter‑clockwise to each player. The remaining cards become the stock pile and are placed face down. The top card of the stock pile is turned face up and placed beside it; this is called the "offered card" (or "choice card"). The player to the dealer's right starts the game.

=== Turns ===
Players can pick up the top card from the deck or take the offered card. The chosen card is face-up, and the first card in the stock is face-down. After a player takes a card, they will have 22 cards. The player discards a card face-up, the offered card to the next player. Play moves to the right. If the player misses discarding the card or picking up and does only one, the player has to finish the game with fewer cards which is more difficult.

If the player does not want the choice card, they place it on the discard pile (which increases as the number of stock cards decreases). When the stock pile is empty, the discard pile is shuffled and placed face-down to form a new stock pile.

=== Sets ===
A set is a group of at least three cards. It may contain a:

- Tunnel (also known as a tunnela, tunella or tunnella): Three cards of the same rank and suit, such as 4♠ 4♠ 4♠. A tunnel after the primary deal is worth five points if it is displayed before a player picks a card from the stockpile; otherwise, it is only one of the three primary sets.
- Sequence: Three or more consecutive cards of the same suit with a wildcard, such as 5♦ 6♦ Jkr
- Pure sequence: Three or more consecutive cards of the same suit without a wildcard, such as A♥ 2♥ 3♥
- Trial: Three or four cards of the same rank but different suits, such as 7♠ 7♥ 7♣
- Dirty trial: A trial with at least one wildcard, such as 8♣ 8♦ Jkr. Wildcards may be added to make the set more than three.

There are two types of sets:

- Primary (pure) sets: The first three sets. Only pure sequences, tunnels, and 7 dublees can form primary sets.
- Secondary (dirty) sets: Secondary sets can be formed from sequences, tunnels, or trials. If a player has 7 dublees, an 8th dublee would be a secondary set.

A dublee is a set of two cards of the same rank and suit, such as 9♣ 9♣. 7 dublees is equivalent to three pure sequences. Fewer than seven dublees are counted as a zero set. Dublees cannot be used by fewer than four players. If a player with a dublee wins the game, they earn an extra seven points.

=== Primary-set rounds ===
During each player's turn, they try to make the first three primary (or pure) sets. When a player makes their primary sets, they display the sets face-up and must discard a card. The first player to complete the primary set can select a random card (face-down) from the deck and place it at the bottom of the deck. For the rest of the round, this card is the "Main Maal" and is called "Tiplu". Subsequent players who display the primary sets can look at the Tiplu, but not change it.

If a player has 7 dublees, it is considered a complete primary set. The player must place the 7 dublees face-up and can choose (or see) the Tiplu, depending on the order in which the player completed the primary round.

=== Secondary-set rounds ===
Players who finish the primary round move on to the secondary (dirty) rounds, and know the Tiplu. The player can now arrange the remaining cards into more sets with wildcards. In the following example, 4♠ is the Tiplu.

Wildcards can replace any card in the deck. There are two categories of wildcard: point cards (maal) and non-point cards.

Maal cards are:

- Tiplu: The main point Card/Main Maal Card/Main Wild Card. The card that is randomly selected and placed at the bottom of the stock by the first player to finish the pure round is the Tiplu. In addition to its value as a wildcard, it has three points. In addition to this card, there are two more Tiplu cards (since three decks of cards are used).
- Poplu: The card immediately above the Tiplu of the same suit is known as the poplu. Each poplu is two points and a wildcard.
- Jhiplu: The card immediately below the Tiplu of the same suit is known as the Jhiplu. Each Jhiplu is two points and a wildcard.
- Alter: The card of the same rank as the Tiplu and a similarly colored suit is the alter card. In the standard game they are wildcards, but may have five points in addition to being wild.
- Putali: Optional jokers are wildcards and five points each. In normal play, they are omitted.

All cards of the same rank as the Tiplu are wildcards without score values; they can help complete sets to finish the game, but do not contribute to scoring. There are nine ordinary jokers, with no points. If Alter cards are used, there are six jokers (with no points) and three alter cards with points.

=== Ending ===
The game ends when a player arranges the cards in complete sets with or without wildcards and displays them. The player has one discarded card at the end of the game.

The eighth dublee also ends the game. The player who is playing dublee gets to pick up the offered card only if it forms the eighth dublee to end the game; otherwise, they pick a card from the stock deck. Although a dublee cannot be formed with a wildcard (jokers or maals), two jokers are considered a dublee. When the game ends, players who have not completed pure rounds will know the Tiplu and other points cards. In a typical game, there are three primary sets (nine cards) and four secondary sets (12 cards).

If the stock pile finishes and no players have ended the game, the game is deemed dismissed.

=== Scoring ===
The player who ends the game gets 10 points from each of the players who have not completed primary rounds, and three points from each of the players who have done so.

Each player gets (or loses) points based on:

- The round in which they were playing (pure rounds [-10], dirty rounds [-3] or ended the game [+10 or +3])
- The number of point cards the player has (+), and the number of point cards other players have (-)

When the game ends, the round is over and a new deal follows.

== Maal ==
Scoring in Marriage involves calculating the total number of points (maal) in the game. Maal cards or tunnels carry points. At the end of a round, each player separates their maal cards from the rest and totals them. The total is the net score of all the players' maal points. Each player's points are based on what they have in their hand, regardless of who ends the game.

Cards in hand
	Single	Double	Triple
Ordinary card	0	0	0
Ordinary joker	0	0	0
toplu or jhiplu	2	5	10
Putali or Bhuut or Lamphe	5	15	25
Tiplu	3	8	N/A
Alter	5	15	25
Marriage (On Hand)	10	30	N/A

Sets
	Tunnel	Double tunnel	Triple tunnel
Ordinary card	5	15	25
Ordinary joker	10	20	30
Poplu/Jhiplu	15	35	NA
Putali or Bhuut	45	N/A	N/A
Alter	35	N/A	N/A
Marriage (face-up)	15	35	N/A

Rules and scoring exceptions:

- One cannot form a set of three cards when two are the same rank and suit and the third card is the same rank and a different suit, such as 1♥ 2♠ 3♥
- Dublees cannot be converted to a trial or tunnel with wildcards. The cards must be different suits but the same rank (trial) or a tunnel (three cards of the same suit and rank). Wildcards cannot be used to form a tunnel after the primary sets are displayed.
- Ending a game with dublees is the same as ending with a sequence; the dublee player need not give three extra to other players who end the game. If a dublee ends the game, the player receives five extra points.
- A tunnel after the primary deal in one's hand is worth five points, but must be displayed before a player picks a card from the stockpile; otherwise, it is only one of the three primary sets.
- If a player has one Tiplu, one Poplu and one Jhiplu, the combination is called "marriage" and is worth 10 points.
- A player does not have to have the cards in a set to score; having them in their hand as part of different sets (or otherwise) is enough to score.
- A game gets cancelled if cards are not distributed equally which is 21 to all player or less than 21 or more than 22.

== Variations ==
- Open: A player does not need three primary sets to see the main Maal, but can only use wildcards after showing their three primary sets.
- Tunnel Pachaunu: Tunnel points are not counted if the player does not complete the pure-sequence round.
- Maal Pachaunu: Point cards are not counted if the player does not complete the pure-sequence round.
- Alter: Alternate Maal cards are counted.
- Murder: The points (maal) of player(s) still on pure/primary rounds are not counted. It is similar to Maal (tunnel) Pachaunu
- Kidnap: The player who completes the game wins the cards of all players who have not displayed their primary sets, including their maal cards.
- Dublee: When a player shows seven dublees, the game may become a dublee game.
- Better: When the rounds are complete, players then play with double the regular game points. Dublee may also make the game become better.
- Dhoos: If a player cheats or makes an error or throws Maal or jocker to other player who has already seen Maal, they must award 15 points to the winner of the next game. If the player who cheated (or made an error) wins the next game, the penalty is cancelled. There is also exception that players can throw Maal if anyone has not seen Maal and another exception is that players can throw Putali(Lamphe, Bhuut, Putali) to other players, which is called Dhulo pelai.
- Master card: A new variation, in which an extra card (the master card, a wildcard worth ten points) is added to the deck of three cards and jokers. It may optionally be used to form primary sets.
