= 500 rum =

Card game

500 Rum
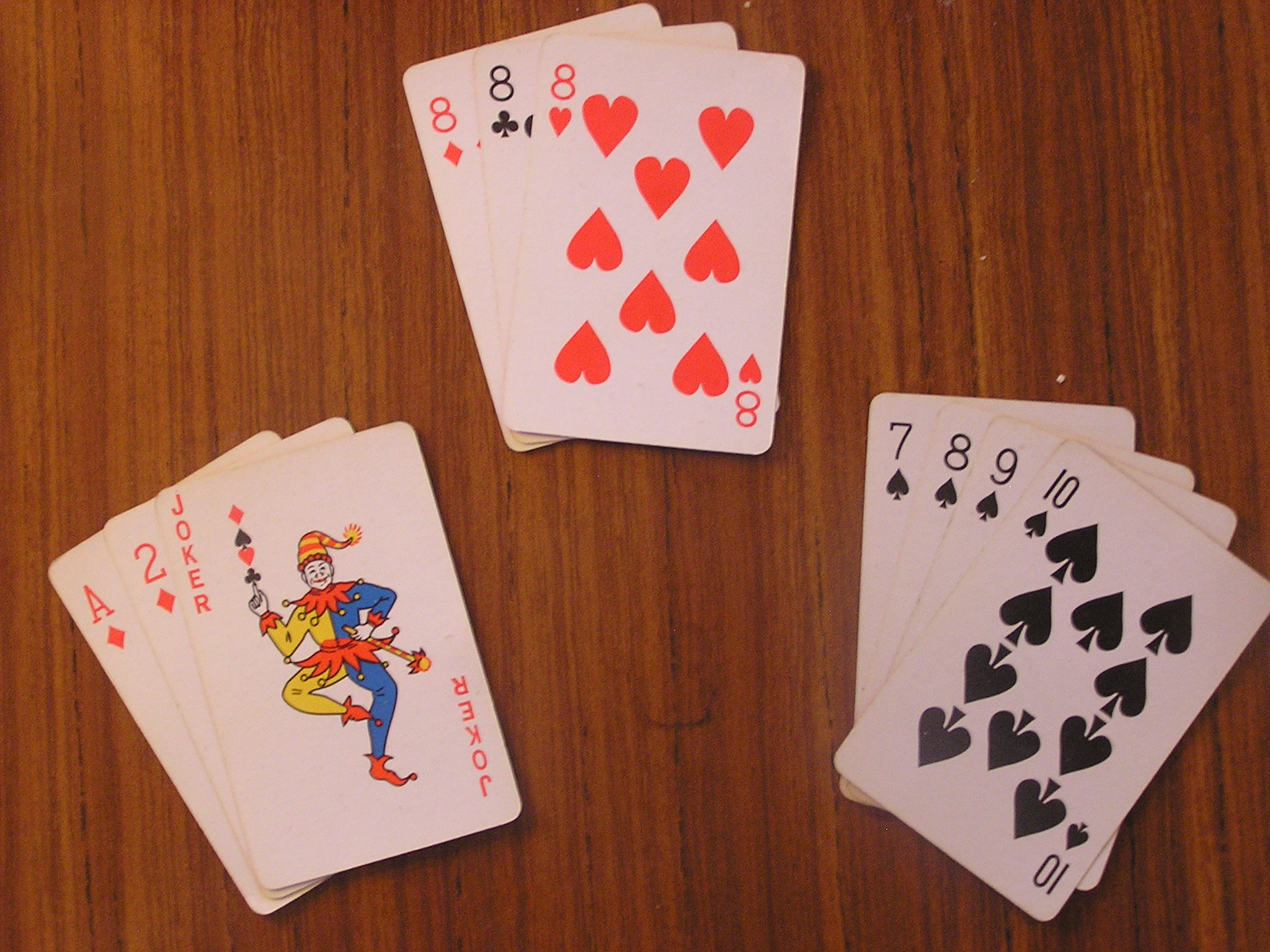
- Origin: United States
- Alternative names: Pinochle rummy, Michigan rummy
- Type: Matching
- Players: 2–8; 3–5 (best)
- Skills: Attention
- Cards: 52–54 for 2–4 players (optional jokers); 104–108 for 5–8 players
- Deck: Anglo-American
- Rank (high→low): A K Q J 10 9 8 7 6 5 4 3 2 (A)
- Play: Clockwise
- Playing time: 20 min.

Related games
- Rummy • Treppenrommé

500 rum, also called pinochle rummy, Michigan rummy, Persian rummy, rummy 500 or 500 rummy, is a popular variant of rummy. The game of canasta and several other games are believed to have developed from this popular form of rummy. The distinctive feature of 500 rum is that each player scores the value of the sets or cards they meld. It may be played by 2 to 8 players, but it is best for 3 to 5.

The term Michigan rummy may also refer to an unrelated game, very similar to the Canadian Rummoli (both sharing traits with the much older Poch), involving a playing board, chips, and accumulated pots that are awarded to players who play certain cards.

== Rules ==
=== The cards and dealing ===
500 rum is played using a standard French deck and can use 52 cards, or 53–54 cards including one or two jokers. When playing with 5 or more players, two decks of cards should be used with a total of 104–108 cards.

The players draw for deal, low dealing first. Ace is the lowest card in the draw. The dealer shuffles, and the player to the right cuts. The dealer completes the cut and deals cards one at a time to each player face down, clockwise starting at the dealer's left. The number of cards dealt depends on the number of players.

| Number of players | Number of cards dealt |
|---|---|
| 2 players | 13 cards |
| 3 or more | 7 cards |

The remaining cards are placed in a single pile face down between the players, forming the stock. The top card of the stock is turned face up and placed besides the stock to start the discard pile. As play continues any cards added to the discard pile are placed face up on top of any cards already in the discard pile. The discard pile should be slightly spread, so that players can readily see all the cards in it. Players are permitted to move the cards in the discard pile to view the cards, but may not change the order of the discard pile. After a round is complete, the next player to the left becomes the dealer.

In one variation, the discard pile is started by dealing one extra card face down to the player on the dealer's left, who can then choose any card from their hand to place face up besides the stock to start the discard pile. The player that wins the round then becomes the dealer in the next round.

=== Game play ===
The object of the game is to score points as in regular rummy by laying down or laying off cards, initially in groups of matching cards known as melds, with a meld consisting of either: 3 or 4 cards of the same rank (e.g. 8♠ 8♥ 8♣ or 8♦ 8♠ 8♥ 8♣) called a set; or in sequences of three or more cards of the same suit (e.g. 8♠ 9♠ 10♠) called a run. One variation of the game requires that laying down a run can only be done starting with four or more cards of the same suit (e.g. 7♠ 8♠ 9♠ 10♠).

Aces can be played as either a high card or a low card, meaning that they may be played after a king as a high card (e.g. Q♠ K♠ A♠) or before a two as a low card (e.g. A♠ 2♠ 3♠). Going "around the corner" means that Ace is allowed to be both high and low in the same run (e.g. Q♠ K♠ A♠ 2♠). If going around the corner is not allowed, Q-K-A and 2-3-4 must be separate runs.

Each player in turn, beginning with the player to the left of the dealer, may draw either the top card of the stock or any card from the discard pile. Once a card is picked up, either from the stock or the discard pile, it is final and no other cards may be picked up. However, there are two conditions when drawing more than one card from the discard pile:

1. The player must take all the cards on top of (i.e., discarded after) the selected card.
2. The selected card so drawn must immediately be used, either by laying it down in a meld or by laying it off on a meld already on the table if permitted.

When drawing a card from the discard pile any remaining cards taken with the card drawn from the discard pile may be either melded in the same turn or simply added to the player's hand. Also, multiple cards picked up from the discard pile are left out until the selected card is played in an acceptable manner.

During a player's turn, after drawing but before discarding, they may lay down any meld of matching cards, or may lay off any cards that match a meld or cards that have already been played. A player may lay down a single card or pairs of cards, but only if they match cards that have already been played. For example, a player may lay down a single card (e.g. 7♠) on either a set that has already been laid down (e.g. 7♦ 7♣ 7♥), or a run or part of a run that has already been laid down (e.g. 8♠ 9♠ 10♠ or 8♠ 9♠). A player may also lay down a pair of cards in sequence of the same suit on a run or part of a run that has already been laid down (e.g. lay down the 6♠ 7♠ on a run of 8♠ 9♠ 10♠ or 8♠ 9♠ previously laid down).

Cards that are laid down or laid off are kept spread out on the table in front of the player, visible to other players. The player ends his turn by discarding a single card from his hand to the discard pile.

Players are usually only permitted to lay down cards when it is their turn, after drawing but before discarding. In a variation, players may put down melds or matching cards on other people's turns. The round is not over until one of the players puts down their last card, so with this variation a player can put down a meld whenever they want, until that last card is down.

If jokers are used in the game, they are treated as wild cards and can represent any card the player chooses even if that card is already used in another meld.

The round is over when one player has no cards in his or her hand, either by melding or laying off all cards, or when there are no cards left in the stock pile. Players typically receive no bonus for finishing first.

=== Discarding ===
When picking up from the discard pile you cannot pick up just to play a single card on a meld or other cards that have already been laid down, sometimes referred to as "picking up to hit". You may only pick up from the discard pile if you were to put down a meld consisting of 3 or more cards including the card that was picked up.

In one variation, a player may pick up from the discard pile to play a single card or pair of cards on a meld or other cards that have already been laid down by any of the players. In another variation, a player may pick up only the top card from the discard pile and keep it in their hand without immediately playing it.

=== Scoring ===
Face cards count as 10 as does the 10 card. A-9 are 5 points, unless the Ace is used high, when it is 15. Jokers count as 15 points.

In order to begin scoring all players must lay no less than 30 points for their first score.

When any player discards the last card in their hand, the play immediately ends. Each player's score is then figured as follows: The player is credited with the point value of all cards that he has showing on the table. From this figure is subtracted the point value of all cards remaining in his hand. The difference is added or subtracted from their score, as the case may be.

If the cards they have shown total 85 points, and the cards left in their hand total 90 points, 5 points are subtracted from their previous net score. If the drawing pile runs out of cards and nobody is able to make a play, then the hand ends and nobody deducts the score from their hand.

The first player whose score reaches +500 wins the game. If two or more players reach 500 on the same hand, the one who goes out is the winner.

==== Modified scoring systems ====
These additional or alternate rules have been put in to simplify scoring and speed up games. Point variants for Aces change the game dynamic somewhat as players may be more or less likely to reveal and play them as a part of runs.

- Aces count 15 no exceptions or variations.
- Aces are worth 25.
- Aces played high are worth 15 except in the case where a single player plays a 4-of-a-kind Ace meld, in which case the meld is worth 100 points (25/ea.).
- Aces can be allowed to "go-around" in order to speed up games; thus allowing a meld of K-A-2.
- All other cards are worth 5 points.
- If preferred, all of these scores may be divided by five and the game played to 100.

==== Boathouse rule ====
Some rummy players play that any player must discard on the turn in which they go out. (A completed turn includes a discard in most variations of Rummy 500, and every turn, even the final turn, is not considered complete without a pile discard). This is often considered standard rules for Rummy.

For example, if a player held a hand of two 3's and picked up another 3, this player would be unable to go out as they would not have a discard. Under this variation, the last card in a set picked up from the discard pile cannot be used as the discard in that round. This may prevent a player from picking up cards that would complete a meld if, after laying down the meld, they would not have a card left to discard. This is a variation that should be agreed upon before play begins.

Also, if the stock is finished then players may continue to draw from the pile only so long as they are able and willing to do so. Otherwise, the hand is finished with all cards in each player's hand counting against them. This is also normally standard. However some play the alternative that the cards should be reshuffled, and play should continue. Another alternative with a depleted stock is for play to continue, with players discarding after each turn until one of the players goes out.

Some variations require that the player must draw two cards from the stock pile. This variation is played as "Boathouse Rum" in Best of Card Games for Windows 95 and Card Hero for Windows 8.

==== Add opponent's hand rule ====
Instead of players subtracting their remaining totals when play is finished, they add the values in their hands to the total of the player who went out. If nobody has gone out when the stock is depleted (see Boathouse rule):

- With two players, or two partnerships: add opponent's remainder to your score.
- With more than two players: do not add any totals.
- Alternatively, continue play with a discard after each turn until one of the players goes out.

This again, is meant to speed up the game. Also when one player plays his last card, the other player reserves the chance to add any of his deadwood cards to his opponent's melds.

== Variations ==
=== Dealer's gambit ===
This game is the same as 500 Rum, with the following exceptions. The pack is 54 cards: the standard 52 cards plus two jokers. Some people play with 56 cards, including four jokers. Unlike ordinary rummy, dealing is always rotated anti-clockwise.

At the beginning of each deal one joker is removed from the pack. After shuffling and dealing that joker is placed face-up at the side of the pack closest to the dealer. This is the 'dealer's joker' and may be used at any time in the game by the dealer, unless it has been 'blocked' [see below] by another player's joker. The second joker is shuffled and dealt with the rest of the cards.

After dealing but before any of the players look at their cards the dealer must nominate the effect of the jokers for that hand. The dealer may nominate the joker to do one of the following:

1. Wild card. The joker may be used as a wild card in any set or sequence. The wild joker is worth zero points.
2. Double. The joker doubles the value of any set. The joker is placed face up over any meld, whilst it is being melded. Once the joker has been added to the meld, that set is 'sealed' and no further cards can laid off onto it.
3. The joker is used to 'split' the discard pile from either side of the card selected. Those cards on the inside of the split are then removed from the game for the remainder of that hand. Those cards on the outside of the split are added to the players hand. As per normal the selected card must be used immediately either by laying it down in a set or by laying it off on a set already on the table.

The dealer's joker can be 'blocked' at any time in the game by placing another joker face down over it. If the dealer's joker is so blocked it may not be used by the dealer for the remainder of that hand.

Jokers have a zero value if still in a players hand at the end of the turn. There are no penalties for not using the jokers.

Each joker nomination may be used strategically by the dealer to improve their position or undermine that of other players. As a result, this is a highly strategic variant of the game which may result in long games with significant fluctuations in the score. As a result, some people only play to a smaller score of 250 points.

=== Partnership 500 rum ===
This game is the same as 500 rum, with the following exceptions.

Four players are organized into two teams of two players each, with partners facing each other across the table. The rules are exactly as in 500 rum, except the partners may play off on each other's matched sets and sequences in an effort to go out as quickly as possible. When any player goes out, the play ends and the score of each partnership is figured as a unit. The game is over when either side reaches +500. The team with the highest score over 500 wins, even if a team goes out first.

=== Persian rummy ===
The game is the same as partnership 500 rum, with the following exceptions, and the pack is 56 cards: the standard 52 cards plus four jokers.

Each joker counts as 20 points, and jokers may not be used in sequences or as wild cards, but only in groups of three or four jokers. Any meld of four, laid down all at once, counts double its face value. Thus, four jokers laid down together count 160; three jokers laid down count 60, and the fourth joker when added counts only 20 more. Four 6s put down together count 48, but three 6s count only 18, and the fourth 6 adds only 6 points. If a player gets rid of all his cards, his side scores a bonus of 25.

A game ends after two deals. The side with the best score receives a bonus of 50 points and wins the difference between its final score and the opponents' score.

=== Rummy ===
If a player discards a card that plays into any match set or sequence already laid-off on the table then other players may call-out "Rum". The first player to call "Rum" may only take the discarded card and must lay-off it on the table in front of them in their laid-off cards area. They may not combine it with cards in their hand to create a new match set or sequence.

=== 7-card straight ===
If a player lays down a 7-card straight and then discards his last card, he is awarded 500 points. This is known as the "Rummy Master's Hand".

== See also ==
- Pope Joan (card game)
- Pope Julius (card game)
