= Dummy rummy =

Card game

Dummy Rummy
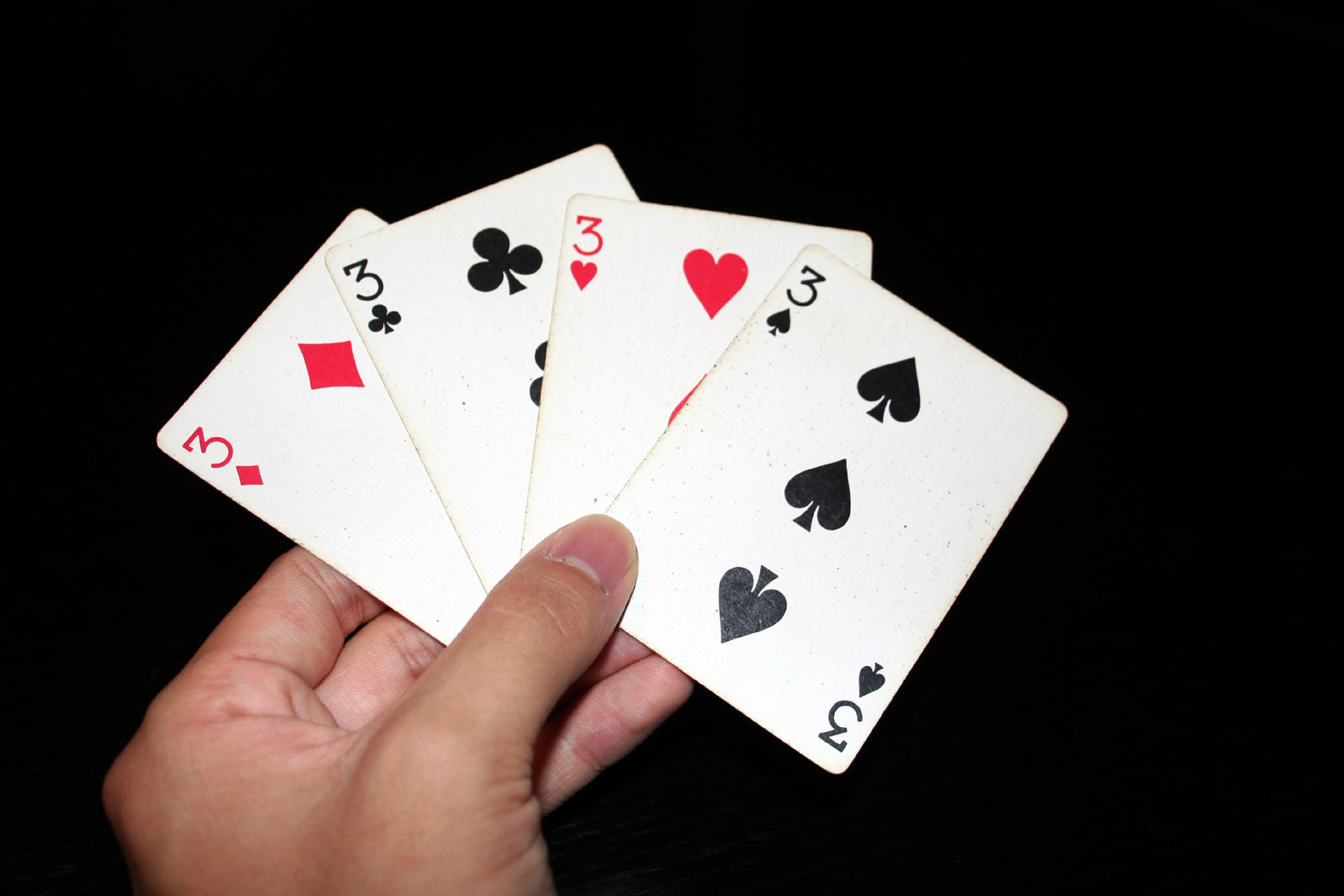
- Origin: United States
- Family: Matching
- Players: 2–4
- Skills: Strategy
- Cards: 108 cards
- Deck: Anglo-American
- Play: Clockwise
- Playing time: 20 min.
- Chance: Easy

Related games
- Contract rummy

Dummy rummy is a variation of rummy for two to four players. It is played with two standard decks of cards, including four jokers, for a total of 108 cards. The jokers and twos are wild. It appears to be of American origin and may be copyrighted.

== Description ==
Each player is dealt thirteen cards. During each hand, the object is to complete the appointed run and kinds, and get rid of as many cards as possible. When one player gets rid of all of their cards, the cards remaining in the rest of the players hands score penalty points. The player who completes all twelve hands with the fewest points wins.

== Rules ==
=== Hands ===
As in most rummy games, melds consist of either sets of equal cards, or runs of consecutive cards. Wild cards may be substituted for any number of cards in a set or run. There are twelve meld sets each player must complete as follows:

- 2- 3 of a kind
- 3 a kind, and 1- run of four
- 2-4 of a kind
- 2- runs of 4
- 1- 4 of a kind, and 1- run of 4
- 2- 3 of a kind, and 1- run of 4
- 1- 3 of a kind, and 1- run of 7
- 3- 3 of a kind
- 2- 5 of a kind
- 2- runs of 5
- 8 of a kind
- run of 10

If a player is unable to complete the appointed hand, they must try again on the next hand.

=== Sets ===
A set consists of cards of equal rank – for example three threes or five queens. In this variation, sets may contain two cards of the same suit; i.e., two 9 of hearts.

=== Runs ===
A run consists of cards in sequence, the cards do not have to be in the same suit, such as 2-3-4-5 of hearts. Aces can be high (J-Q-K-A) or low (A-2-3-4) but not both (K-A-2-3).

=== Wild cards ===
Twos and jokers are wild and can be used to represent any desired card.

== Play ==
The player to the left of the dealer begins, and the turn to play continues clockwise. A turn consists of drawing, melding and discarding.

=== Cut-ins ===
This is an optional rule. When a player sees a card he or she likes then they can ask to cut in and take the card along with three additional cards from the top of the deck. It is up to the player whose turn it is, to allow this or to take the card themselves. That player must also check if any others want it left of the one whose turn it is until no players want it that will go before them. Any player may cut in at any time between a meld and the next players draw up to two times. If they lose count none=11 cards; one=14 cards; and 2 cut ins=17 cards.

=== Drawing ===
There are two options a player has on their turn:

1. Take the top card of the discard pile and add it to their hand.
2. Take a face-down card from the top of the undealt stock cards.

If the player has already played their meld set, they must draw from the undealt stock cards.

=== Melding ===
Once the player has drawn, they may place their meld set down if they are able. On subsequent turns, players may only add to existing melds, as melds outside of the prescribed meld sets are not allowed. They can, however, add to another players' melds.

=== Discarding ===
The final part of each player's turn is to discard one card from their hand face up onto the discard pile.

The objective is to meld or discard all of one's cards, and the play continues until one player manages to go out by getting rid of all the cards from their hand. They must always end their turn by discarding.

When discarding, a player may not discard a card if it creates a meld, (run or a set). If an opponent notices the error prior to the next player picking up, that player is permitted to remove the set from the pile and place it with their other melds.

=== Scoring ===
As soon as a player goes out, the hand is scored. The player who went out counts nothing for this hand. The opponents count the total value of the cards remaining in their hand. The value of the individual cards is a follows:

Card	Score
Each 3, 4, 5, 6, 7, 8, 9	5
Each 10, J, Q, K	10
Each Ace	15
Each 2, Joker	50

The value of their hand is added to their running total. The player that completes all twelve meld sets with the lowest score wins.

== See also ==
- Three thirteen
