= Penang rummy =

Malaysian variant of Rummy

Penang Rummy
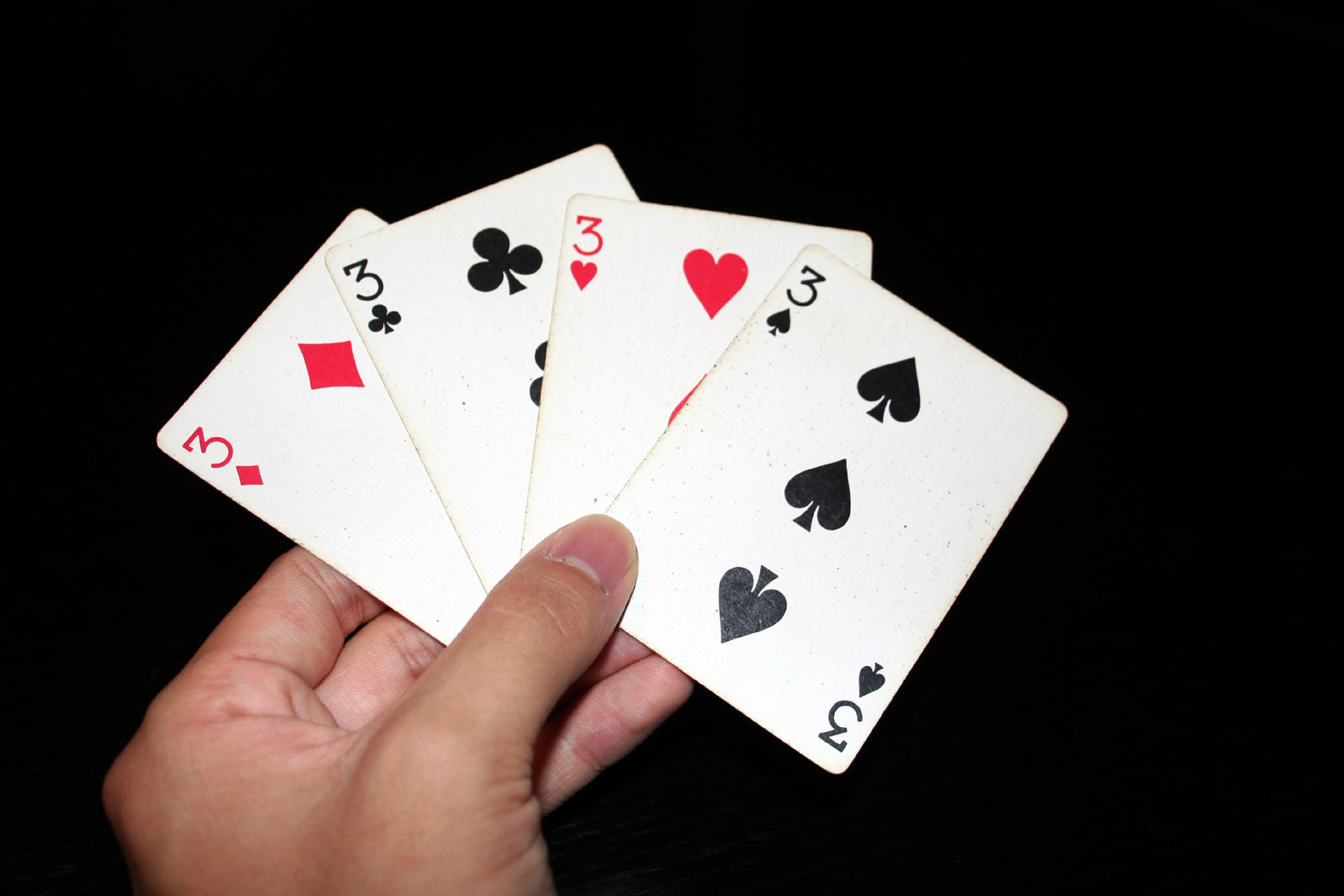
- Type: Rummy
- Players: 2-5 (4 best)
- Cards: 2x52 plus 8 Jokers
- Deck: Anglo-American
- Rank (high→low): A K Q J 10 9 8 7 6 5 4 3 2
- Play: Clockwise

Related games
- Rummy

Penang rummy or si rummy is a variant of the rummy card game which originated in the Penang region of Malaysia in the late 1980s. The word si in Penang Hokkien language means 'dead'. It reflects the nature of the card game, where the hand is dead, with no drawing of new cards or exchanging of cards, throughout the whole game.

== Object ==
The basic concept is the same as most Rummy games is to form melds, eliminating deadwood cards. "Deadwood" cards are those that do not form part of a meld. They are undesirable and counted towards players' points at the end of each game. The objective is to have less points than all opponents.

== The game ==
Penang Rummy is played with 2 standard 52-card packs of playing cards plus 8 jokers as wildcards. A total of 112 cards is used.

The ideal number of players is 4. Sometimes a game can commence with 3 players, in which case each player will receive more cards to begin with. A two-handed game is rarely played, and for five or more players an additional pack of cards is used.

=== Dealing ===
The first dealer is determined randomly. Subsequent dealers change from game to game. Two basic systems are used to determine the dealer. In a game where points are not recorded, the player with the highest points in the last game (the worst loser) will deal. They are deemed to "pay a small forfeit" by doing a service for all by taking up the task of dealing the cards.

In a game where points are recorded, the player who won the last game will deal. They are deemed to have benefited from the last game, especially when money is at stake, and hence should provide a service to all by doing the task of dealing as a gesture of appreciation.

The dealer starts the dealing with the player to their left. This goes on in a clockwise manner, until each player receives 20 cards. In a 3-player game, each player will receive 25 cards instead of 20. The remaining cards are put aside and play no further role in the game.

=== Play ===
The game starts with the player on the left of the dealer, and goes on in clockwise manner. On each turn, player must take at least 1 action of either melding or laying off. They can of course decide to do both. A player, however, cannot skip their turn.

There is no upper limit in number of actions a player can take per turn. For example, a player may decide to make 2 melds, then lay off 1 card to an existing run and lay off 2 cards to an existing set, all in a single turn. In each game, a player must first do a meld, before he/she can do any lay-offs. The first meld in a game is called a "passport".

Note that Penang Rummy or Si Rummy does not have the action of drawing a card or discarding unwanted cards. This is the distinctive feature of this Rummy variant.

=== Melding ===
If a player has 3 or more cards that meet the criteria of a "run" or a "set" below, they may meld by laying these cards, face up, in front of them. The melds are like typical Rummy games:

- "Runs" of 3 or more cards in sequence, of the same suit. For example, 3♥-4♥-5♥-6♥. Aces can be played low as in A-2-3-4-5; or high as in 10-J-Q-K-A. However, the run is not continued after high Ace, i.e. J-Q-K-A-2-3 is not allowed. So the maximum length of a run is 14 cards (A-2-3-4-5-6-7-8-9-10-J-Q-K-A).
- "Sets" of 3 or more cards sharing the same rank. For example, 8♥-8♥-8♣-8♠. Note that, unlikely many other Rummy rules, duplicate of suit is allowed in a same set. So, theoretically, a set can have a maximum of 14 cards (8 normal cards plus 6 wildcards).

=== Laying off ===
A player may also choose to "lay off" some cards on an existing meld. This means that if a player can add to a run or a set that is in front of them or any of the other players, they may do so.

For an existing meld of 3♥-4♥-5♥-6♥, another card of 2♥ or 7♥ can be added, thereby continuing the run in either direction. For an existing meld of 8♥-8♥-8♣-8♠, another card of 8♠ or 8♦ can be added to the set.

There is no limit in number of additional card a player can add to a run or set in a turn.

== Game rules ==
=== Wildcard substitution ===
A player may substitute a wildcard on table (in a run or set) with a card in their hand, provided the card fits. They can then keep the wildcard for future use.

Wildcard Substitution is not counted as an action. So a player must still take one other action of either melding or laying off, after they perform a wildcard substitution, if they have not done so for that turn.

There is no limit how many wildcard a player can substitute in a turn.

=== Passport ===
At the beginning of each game, it is mandatory for a player to play a meld before anything else. This first meld is called a "passport". Failing to do so result in an instant "Dead", and sitting out for the rest of that game round. There is no point requirement for passport meld, unlike other Rummy rules. A lay-off cannot be used as a passport. In addition, wildcard substitution cannot be carried before a player has a passport.

Failing to obtain a passport is a rare occurrence, given the large number of cards in hand, large number of wildcards, and relatively low requirement of a passport. Player considers oneself to be really unlucky if failing to obtain a passport.

=== Declare Dead ===
When a player can neither meld nor lay-off when it comes to their turn, they have to Declare "Dead". The game still goes on for the rest of the players, but the player participates no further in the rest of that game.

The effect is that the player can no longer reduce deadwoods in their hand, and therefore stuck with all the points in the dead hand. Even subsequently when there are new melds that the player could have been able to lay off more cards, they cannot do so because they are out of the game. So it is desirable to delay declaring "Dead" as much as possible. In other words, players try very hard to keep their hand alive.

It is not unusual to see player laying off 3-of-a-kind of Aces in their hand one-by-one, if there is already another existing set of Aces on the table. This helps to keep the hand alive for 3 more rounds. It is also a common strategy not to meld if one does not have to. Melding helps to keep other players alive, which is not desirable for oneself.

A type of "Dead" declaration is failing to get a "passport" right from the beginning. In other words, the player does not even get a chance to play in that game round.

=== Declare Game ===
When a player has gotten rid of all of their cards, they declare "Game" and win the hand. This is the same as "Going Out" or "Knocking" in other Rummy variants. All other players start to total up the points of their deadwoods, which may include any wildcards. They cannot play on even though they still have melds or lay-offs that they can play in hand.

Note that in Penang Rummy, it is not unusual to have no one declares "Game". Instead, many games end up with 4 players declaring "Dead". Therefore, the more realistic strategy is to minimise points in your hand when declaring "Dead".

== See also ==
- Conquian
- Continental (card game)
