= Bing rummy =

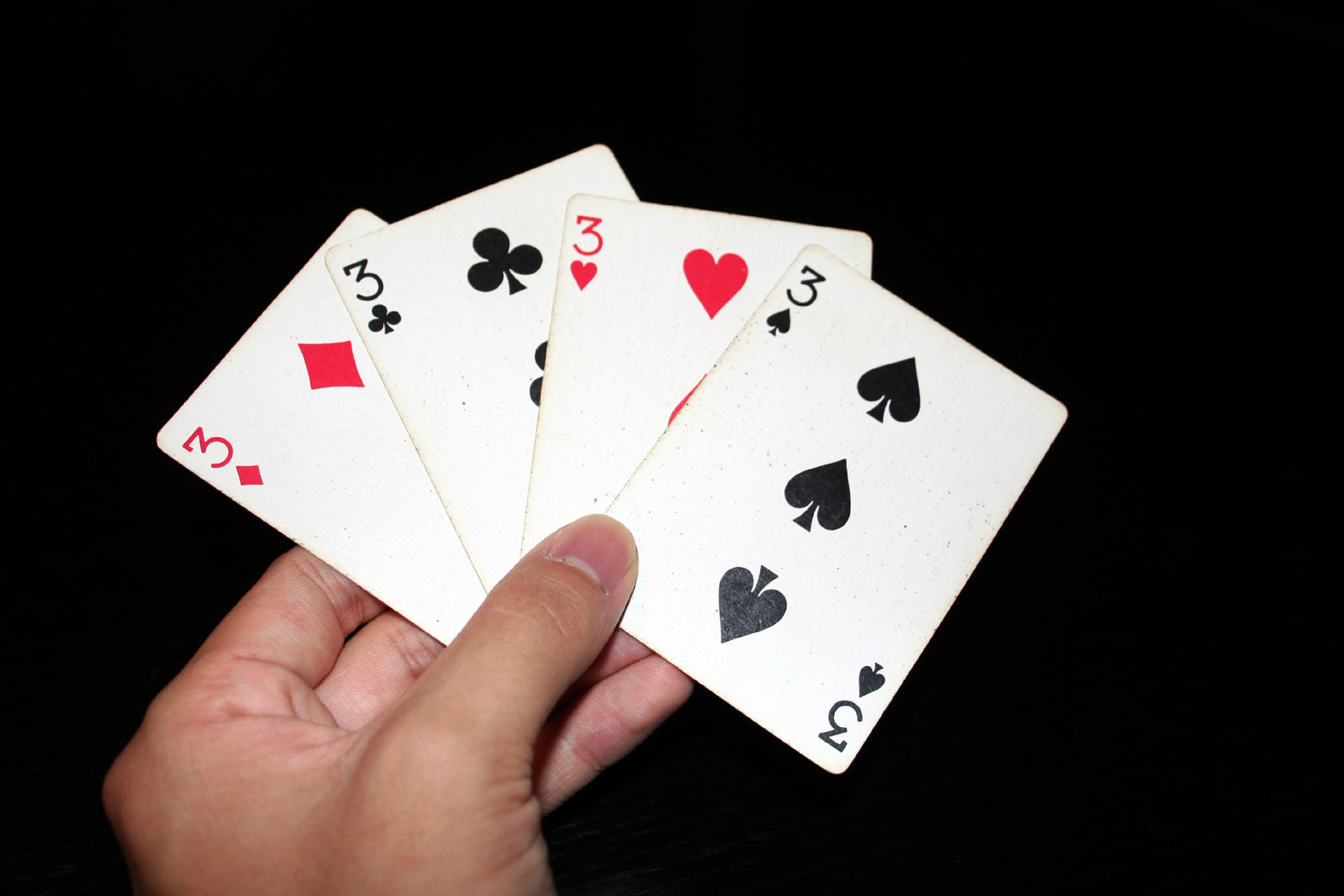
- Origin: United States
- Family: Matching
- Players: 2-8
- Skills: Strategy
- Cards: 104 cards
- Deck: Anglo-American
- Play: Clockwise
- Playing time: 20 min.
- Chance: Easy

Related games
- Contract rummy

Bing rummy is a variant of kalooki (a rummy-based gambling card game) invented in the mining towns of Alaska. The game can be played with 2 to 8 players but works best with 3 to 6 players. It is unknown how the game came to be called “bing” although it may be because of the mining terms: unit of weight equal to 800 pounds, or a pile of rich lead ore. It is probably the second definition that gives the game its name referring to the pile of coins that accumulate throughout the game; especially as it is the Galena lead mines that popularized the term “bing ore”. These mines opened in 1919 about the time the game was developed.

== Play ==
The deck consists of two standard 52-card decks (no jokers) with deuces wild. The game starts with each person buying in for the agreed amount (traditionally 25 cents). Once the cards are shuffled, the player on the dealer's right “cuts for a deuce” viz. starts to cut the deck and if the bottom card of the top section is a deuce, the player can keep the card. This is not a true cut as the two sections do not exchange positions.

Each player is dealt 14 cards. If the player on the dealer's right cut a deuce, they are only dealt 13 additional cards, skipping the first one making 14 total. The remaining cards are placed in a draw pile and the top card is turned over to start the discard pile. Play then begins with the player on the dealer's left. On their turn, a player has three choices:

1. Draw a card from the pile and then discard
2. Take the top card from the discard pile and then discard a different card
3. Meld

=== Melding ===
A player may not meld on the same turn in which they drew a card or picked up the card from the discard pile. This is different than other rummy games in which players draw/meld/discard all in the same turn. This distinctive element of bing is tricky for beginners too get used to.

A meld consists of three or more cards in the same rank (e.g. 8s 8h 8s) or a run of three or more cards in the same suit (e.g. 5d 6d 7d). Deuces are wild. The first time an individual player melds, they must play at least three sets (e.g. Kd Kh Kc; 8c 9c 10c; 3h 3s 3h 3s). During their first meld or anytime thereafter, a player may play cards on any other meld on the table. In the above example, a player (provided that they melded their three sets to start) could also meld a king, a 7 of clubs or jack of clubs, or a 3. Since a player's meld does not score any points, those cards would be placed on the other player's meld.

An important rule about melding is that a player cannot meld in such a way so that the cards left in their hand would put them over 75 points. For example, a player starts the hand with 63 points. They can only meld if they will have 12 or fewer points left in their hand. Moreover, whenever they draw/discard they must ensure their hand stays under 12 points.

=== Scoring ===
When a player has melded all 14 cards, the players count up the points in their hand with each card valued as its rank, face cards are 10 points (A hand with 6, Q, Q would be 26 points) and aces are 15 points (A hand with A, 3 would be 18 points). This total is added to the player's running score and if they finish with a score of 76 or more they can buy in for the starting amount of cash, they would then have a score equal to the highest score of 75 or less.

A player with less than 76 points wins when all the other players have 76 points or more.

Example At the start of a hand players A, B, C and D have the following points:-

A – 31

B – 5

C – 19

D – 47

In the next hand, players C goes out with the other players having the following deadwood counts:- A – 58, B – 6, D – 29.

The new totals would be as follows:

A – 31+58 = 89

B – 5+6 = 11

C – 19

D – 47+29 = 76

Players A and D both have 76 points or more and are out of the game, but if bing rummy is being played for money they could both choose to buy back in. They would then resume the game on 19 points in this example, that being the highest score among the remaining players in the game.

=== Strategy ===
There are three main strategies.

1. Early lay: As soon as a player can lay down three sets, they do so. This has the advantage that the player is rarely caught with a lot of points (they have five or fewer cards in their hand) but it does give other players more opportunities to play. If a player has a nine of hearts in their hand and another player melds 6h, 7h, 8h, the first player can now meld their nine.
2. Common: Most players hold off until they can play four sets. Typically this leaves two cards in the player's hand resulting in a low score. The major disadvantage of this method is that since a set cannot be made from two cards, this player is forced to play these cards on melds (either their own or other players’).
3. Sandbagging: This player attempts to play all 14 cards in one meld. Although a rare method, it can have its use under the right circumstances especially as the consequence for a person caught with a high score is merely the need to buy back in. Therefore, there is no fundamental difference for a player with a score 73 or 74 as to how many points they are caught with, but sandbagging may catch other players with many points in their hands – perhaps even winning the game (and the money).

Since a player must draw a card and meld on two separate moves, an observant player using the common or sandbagging method may be able to dump points if they suspect a player will go out on the next turn. Since fourteen cards make four 3-card sets with two extra cards, a player almost always must play cards on other players’ melds.
