= Rummoli =

Card game for 2 to 8 people

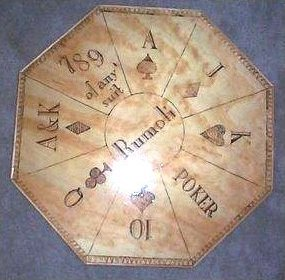
A handmade Rummoli board

Rummoli is a family card game for two to eight people. This Canadian board game, first marketed in 1940 by the Copp Clark Publishing Company of Toronto requires a Rummoli board, a deck of playing cards (52 cards, no jokers), and chips or coins to play. The game is usually played for fun, or for small stakes (e.g. Canadian Dimes). Rummoli is one of the more popular versions of the Stops Group of matching card games, in particular it falls into a subgroup of stops games based on the German Poch and falls into a family of Poch variants such as the French Nain Jaune (Yellow Dwarf), the Victorian Pope Joan but most like the American game Tripoley (a proprietary name, occasionally called by the generic Michigan rummy, but not to be confused with 500 rum) which debuted eight years earlier in Chicago in 1932.

== Rummoli board ==
A Rummoli board, used during play, has the shape of an octagon. It is generally simply printed on a large sheet of paper.

In the centre of the board is a pot called Rummoli, surrounded by eight pots:

- The poker pot
- Ten of spades
- Jack of diamonds
- Queen of clubs
- King of hearts
- Ace of spades
- Ace and King of diamonds
- Sequence 7-8-9 of any suit

Each of these pots on the board is used to store chips. The ordering of the pots around the board is not important.

== Play ==
Ace is high. For brevity, in the following description the "lowest card" means the lowest card in a player's hand or, if two or more cards are equally low, either or any of them.

A game is played in one or more rounds. The game ends at the end of a round, at the discretion of the players. For example, it may be agreed to finish at a certain time, or when all but one player have exhausted their chips.

=== Rounds ===
For each round, there are four stages: the Deal, the Poker phase, the Rummoli phase, and the End of round, which are played in sequence.

==== Deal ====
Before the cards are dealt, each player pays one chip to each pot on the Rummoli board. The dealer then deals around the table to every player, and an extra hand (in some terminology known as a ghost hand) called the widow.

- All cards are dealt, so some players may have one more card than others.
- Once this is completed all players look at their own hands.
- The widow hand can (at the dealer's wish) be swapped with the dealer's hand (must not be exchanged if his hand contains a pay card).
- If the dealer does not exchange hands, the widow hand is auctioned off to the highest bidder, who pays their bid to the dealer, and that player exchanges hands with the widow. Any player except the dealer may bid at any time (must not be exchanged if their hand contains a pay card)

Once the bid is accepted the player is committed to the exchange regardless if the widow is a poorer hand. The widow hand takes no further part in the play.

==== Poker phase ====
- The player to the left of the dealer starts off the betting, having the option to check.
- Betting continues in regular poker fashion.
- The remaining player with the best poker hand wins the poker pot and begins the Rummoli phase. They then "play" the lowest card in the hand. To play a card, the player states the card they are playing and puts it down in front of them. For example, if the lowest card in my hand is the 3 of hearts, I put the card down in front of me face up, say, "three of hearts." If I have the four of hearts, I would play that as well. If I have two 3s in my hand, I may choose either 3.

==== Rummoli phase ====
While this phase is being played if any player lays down a card corresponding to a pot such as Ace of Spades, the player picks up that pot. If a player places down a card that corresponds to a pot without realizing so, then the chips stay in the pot.

The player with the next card in the sequence of the suit must lay that card, and this continues with players laying cards until nobody has the card that follows in sequence (remember, some cards are missing from the spare hand that is not being played).

- If no one holds that next card (that is, it has already been laid or is in the widow hand) the player who last laid a card then lays the lowest card in a suit of the opposite colour (that is, hearts or diamonds if the last card was spades or clubs, and the other way about).
- Having laid an ace the next card in sequence is the lowest card in the opposite colour. The player who played the ace continues.
- A player not having a card of the required colour, the play then moves clockwise. If the next player also cannot play, this step repeats as necessary. If an impasse is reached (all players only have red cards), everyone counts their cards, and throws one chip/coin in the center pot for each card in their hand. The winner of the next hand collects both pots.

A card once laid takes no further part in the play.

==== End of round ====
The first player to have an empty hand wins the Rummoli pot.

- All other players must then pay one chip for each remaining card they hold.
- All pots that are not won remain on the board and accumulate in subsequent rounds.
  - The pots for 7-8-9 and Ace and King of Diamonds often accumulate over several rounds, since these combinations are less likely to be held by one player alone, and even if they are, another player may win the round before there is any chance to play them.

The deal shifts after each round, one player clockwise.

=== End of play ===
After the agreed end of the round play, all chips on the board are placed into one pot and a round of poker dealt and played for it. A variation is to play a round for each pot that still has chips in it, starting with the pot with the fewest chips.

The player with the most chips at the end of the game wins.
