= Zioncheck =

Card game

Zioncheck is a card game. It is similar to shanghai rummy, contract rummy, or phase 10. Hoyle's book of common card games describes several games as being based upon it, and Contract Rummy is believed to have originated from it.

== Play ==
=== Basics ===
Zioncheck is played with multiple decks of 54 standard playing cards, including the Joker (playing card) Wilds. Aces can be high (above a King) or low (below a 2), and Jokers are wild. The number of decks varies from 2 to 4, and is based on the number of players (see chart). Each game is based on six hands, and the rules for each hand are unique. One person begins as dealer for the first hand, and then the person to the dealer's left becomes dealer for the next hand, and so on. For the first 4 hands each player is dealt 10 cards, on the fifth hand each player is dealt 11 cards and on the last hand each player is dealt 14 cards. The rest of the deck is then placed face down in the middle of the players; this is referred to as the draw pile, or if you're familiar with similar card games, it may be referred to as the stock.

The first player to play is the player to the dealer's left, unlike the other players, the first to play in each round gets to go twice. Play always progresses in this clockwise direction. Each player has a choice at the beginning of their turn. They can either pick up the discarded card from the previous person's discard, or they may draw a new card from the draw pile. Once a player sees the card from the draw pile they forfeit their right to pick up a card from the discard pile. After each player draws a card for their turn, they must discard a card from their hand, forming the discard pile previously mentioned. The reason why the first player gets to go twice is that he/she does not have the option to pick up a discarded card. Any player besides the person who discarded the card, may pick up discarded cards regardless of whose turn it is, following that the player who goes before them (the player in front of them) has the right to pick up the card before they do.

=== Going Down ===
The object of each hand is to come up with the correct combination of cards to be able to Go Down, or "lay out". The combination for each hand is different (see chart), and they become more difficult with each subsequent hand. The combinations for each hand are either group also called sets or runs or a combination of both. A set is a combination of three or more of a specific number of cards of the same rank, and the suit is not important. An example of a set is three cards that are all 8's, and the 8's can all be of different suits. A run is a combination of four cards in the same suit that have consecutive ranks. An example of a run is the 3 of clubs, 4 of clubs, 5 of clubs, and the 6 of clubs. As previously stated, an ace can be high or low, but it cannot be in between, a few examples. Ace of clubs, 2 of clubs, 3 of clubs, and 4 of clubs is a run, and Jack of clubs, Queen of clubs, King of clubs, Ace of clubs is a run, but King of clubs, Ace of clubs, 2 of clubs, 3 of clubs is not a run. Jokers are wild cards and can be any card in the deck. In hands that require two runs, a player may choose to play the same suit for both runs, however connecting runs must have either a gap, and extra card or nine cards. Examples: Ace of clubs, 2 of clubs, 3 of clubs, and 4 of clubs, 6 of clubs, 7 of clubs, 8 of clubs, and 9 of clubs counts as two runs. Ace of clubs, 2 of clubs, 3 of clubs, and 4 of clubs, 4 of clubs, 5 of clubs, 6 of clubs, and 7 of clubs counts as two runs, but in order for Ace of clubs, 2 of clubs, 3 of clubs, 4 of clubs, 5 of clubs, 6 of clubs, 7 of clubs, and 8 of clubs to be a run, the player must also have the 9 of clubs (played as part of the higher run).

A player can go down only when it is their turn. As always, they must start their hand by drawing a card, then when they have the correct sequence of cards, they can go down or "meld." They do so by laying their down cards face up on the table in their correct sequence. They can only lay out their down cards and no additional cards. After going down, a player can then play on the downs of other players. When done, they must then discard. If the player has no more cards in their hand after discarding, they are declared the winner.

When a player is "down", they still take their turn in turn with the other players, and they still must draw a card and discard. A player who is down can play his/her cards on the downs that have been completed either by themself or by other players. For example, if a player has lain down a group of 8's, and on a subsequent turn they then draw another 8, they can play this 8 on their group of 8's. They do this by placing the 8 with the set of 8's. If they have a card that they would like to play on a run, they must be sure to keep the order of the run. For example, if there is a run consisting of 4-5-6-7-8 of clubs, the player can play a 3 of clubs or a 9 of clubs. If a run has a wild card in it, any player can replace the wild card with the appropriate card (the wild card is covered by the replacing card). Any player with the appropriate card to replace a joker in any players's down, can replace it at any time and pick the joker up for their own use. If two players are seeking to "take" the joker from a down, the person who lays their replacing card down first gets the joker. For example, if the run had 5-6-Joker-8-9 of clubs and they had a 7 of clubs, they could replace the Joker with the 7 of clubs. If two players had the 7 of clubs, whoever lays their 7 of clubs on the table first receives the joker. Joker cards can only be taken out of runs that are down, however they can be used in groups as well, but a joker can not be taken from a group. A player should only put a joker in a group unless it is absolutely necessary. This game is an old parlour game, and it is considered rude or cruel to play a joker in a group.

=== Winning the game ===
Play progresses until one of the players "goes out," meaning they are able to discard the last card in their hand. That player is then the winner of that hand, and the hand is then over. The winner for the hand gets zero points, and the other players count their cards to determine their score for the hand. Aces and jokers are 15 points, 10s, Jacks, Queens, and Kings are 10 points and all other cards 2-9 are 5 points. If a player goes out, and another player has yet to go down, that player is "stuck".

After all six hands are played, the winner is the player with the lowest score.

== Sequence of Hands ==
Hand	Sequence
1	2 Groups
2	1 Group and 1 run
3	2 runs
4	1 run and 2 Groups
5	2 runs and 1 Groups (remember there are 11 cards in this hand instead of 10)
6	2 runs and 2 Groups (remember there are 14 cards in this hand)

== Rule charts ==
=== Number of decks required ===
- 2 decks: up to 5 people
- 3 decks: 6-8 people
- 4 decks: 9+ people

can increase the number of decks beyond 4 to allow more players
