= Indian Marriage (card game) =

Card game

Marriage
- Gandhari
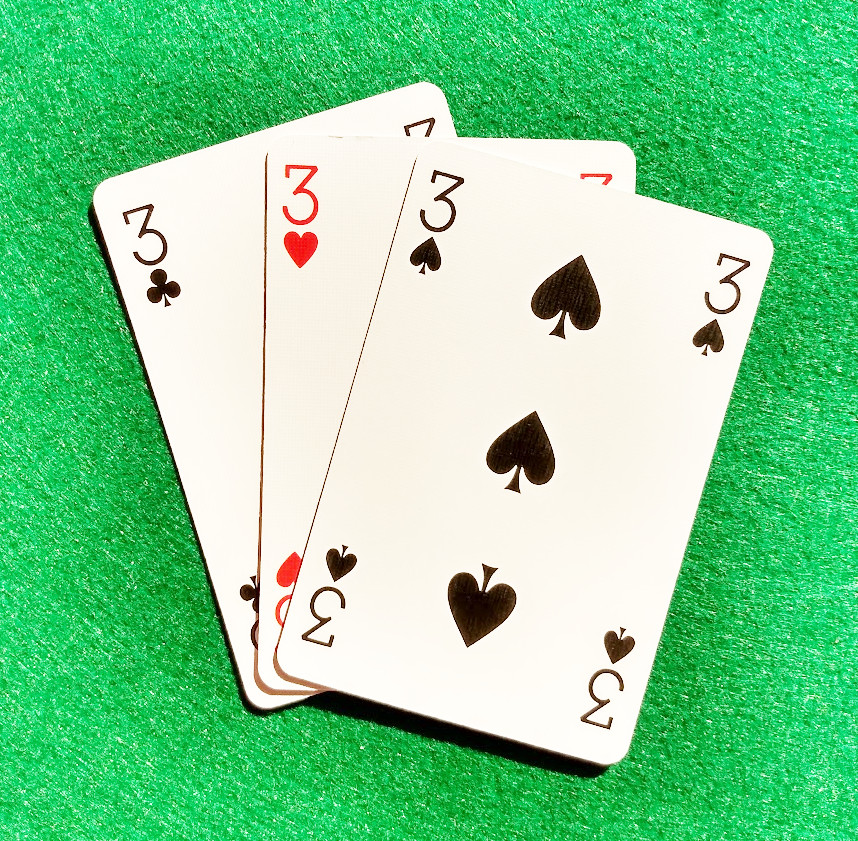
- Three cards of the same rank make a "pure set"
- Origin: Punjab
- Alternative names: Marriage Rummy
- Family: Matching
- Players: 2-7
- Skills: Strategy
- Cards: 3-4 decks
- Deck: Punjabi
- Play: Clockwise
- Playing time: none
- Chance: Easy

Related games
- Gin Rummy

Marriage or Parneva/Parna (Punjabi) (also marriage rummy or 21-cards rummy) is a Rummy card game widely played in India and Nepal. It uses three or more packs of playing cards.

== Object ==
The object of Marriage is to be the player with the largest number of points after playing all hands. Everyone draws one card, the high card deals, and the subsequent deals are passed to the left.

Three 52-card decks are used without any Jokers. No other wild cards are used.

Each player is dealt 21 cards, the remaining stock pile is spread on the table, and the player to the left of the dealer draws the top card from the stock pile to make melds. After a card is drawn, one must be discarded, and the next player to the left has the option of drawing either the top discard or top stock card. Then they must discard.

A set consists of three or more cards of the same face value, (e.g. three queens, three aces, or three sevens). A run consists of four or more cards in sequence of the same suit. If there is an ace in the run, it can serve as either a high card or a low card, but not both in the same run.

== Rules ==
=== Wildcard Selection ===
After dealing 21 cards to each players, a random card is selected from the remaining pile as "joker" and is kept hidden. Except this joker, there are two more wildcard that are used in game which are called as "value" i.e. the card ascending and descending the joker of the same suit. For example, if 3 of hearts (3H) is chosen as joker then the "value" will be 2H—3H—4H and all the 3's will be joker. All "jokers" and "value" can be used as wild card in the game.

=== Hands ===
Each hand consists of a combination of sets and runs. The first aim of the game is to make three "pure run" or "pure set", after which the player is eligible to see the hidden joker. After seeing the joker the player can "show" or end the game if all the cards are melded.

=== Melding ===
Melding the cards is the most important part of rummy. A meld must be made using a minimum of 3 card, there is no limit for maximum cards in a meld. Following are the types of melds allowed -

- Pure run, e.g. 6♦ 7♦ 8♦
- Pure set, e.g. 6♦ 6♥ 6♠
- Run using joker or wild card, e.g. 6♦ 7♦ Jkr
- Set using joker or wildcard, e.g. 6♦ 6♥ Jkr. (Note that 6♦ 6♦ Jkr is not allowed.)
- All joker / wildcard can be used, e.g. Jkr Jkr Jkr

=== Eligibility to see the joker ===
A player can see the hidden joker only after showing 3 pure sets or 3 pure runs and keep those sets or runs on table for others players to confirm. After seeing the joker, the player should have at least 3 pure sets or runs with him thought the hand. Meanwhile, those 3 pure sets or runs can be changes with other pure sets or runs, but minimum of 3 is required throughout that hand.

After seeing the joker the player also become eligible to use the joker or other wildcard in their hand for making sets and runs.

=== Play ===
A player on their turn picks a card either from discard pile or pile, and discards another card from their hand thereafter.

A player can only go down or show after being eligible to see the joker.

Once a player has gone down by satisfying the requirements, they may not create any new sets or runs.

=== The deal ===
All players pick a card at random and return it to the deck, with the player who drew the lowest card dealing first. Each hand starts a new deal, with the turn to deal passing to the right from player to player. Cards are dealt one at a time, face down beginning at the dealer's right. The dealer deals 21 cards face down to each player, places the remainder of the pack face down in the middle, and places the top card from the stock pile face up next to it. Play then starts with the player to the dealer's right and proceeds anti-clockwise.

=== The play ===
Beginning with the player to the right of the dealer, a person starts their turn by selecting either the top card from the stockpile or the top card from the discard pile.

If the player has not yet opened, and has the necessary cards to meet the eligibility requirements, they may then lay down the sets and runs appropriate for seeing the joker. Having become eligible, the player is then free to play jokers and wildcard onto existing sets or runs.

Wild cards may be used to fill in missing cards in a set or a run, and there is no limit to how many wild cards may be used in any set or run. If the player changes their mind as to which cards to play where, only the cards played in the current turn may be picked up for re-use.

The end of a turn occurs when a player discards one card onto the discard pile. Play then continues with the next player to the right.

=== Scoring ===
Since Indian Marriage is a game that is won by having the most points, the numeric value of the cards are counted from 2 to 10. Face cards and Aces count as 10 points. The most important part of scoring in Indian Marriage is "Value". The Value is scores as under :-

- Joker "Value" = 4 points
- Paplu = 2 points
- Tapulu = 2 points
- Paplu + Joker ("Value") + Tapulu is called MARRIAGE = 14 points

If any player has not seen the joker then their hand will count as All Count = 14 points or actual counted points, whichever is lower.

The points of "Value" will be traded with each Player. For example, if Player 1 has value of 4 points and Player 2 have value of 2 points, then Player 2 will give 2 point to Player, similarly each players will trade their value with each other.

== Rules of play ==
=== Stock pile depletion ===
It is possible, when many cards have been taken out of turn in a hand (incurring many penalty cards), that the stock pile may dwindle down to nothing before any player has gone out. Should this happen, the discard pile is turned over once, without shuffling, and play continues in order. If the remaining cards in the stock pile are depleted a second time without any player going out, the hand ends and all points remaining in all players' hands are tallied as they would be had someone gone out.

=== Incomplete hands and games ===
If all players agree, a game may be suspended between hands and later resumed. However, play can only resume if all players are available and if the game resumes in the same calendar year as it started. Players must be seated in the same relative positions to each other when the game resumes.

Any player not finishing a full game (one or more hands not played to completion) will post a game total equal to the sum of the two highest complete game totals posted by other players in that game. If two other complete game totals are not available in that game, all statistics for that game are discarded. Similarly, any player not providing a score for a particular hand that he or she played will post a score equal to the sum of the two highest scores posted by other players for that hand. If two other scores are not available in that hand, the hand is re-played.

=== Play out of turn ===
If a player going out of turn is not stopped before discarding, it stands as a play in turn and intervening players lose their turns. If the player out of turn has chosen to take the top card of the stock pile, it is too late for rectification after the player has added that card to his or her hand.

If it is not too late, as defined, to correct the error, the offender restores the card drawn, takes back any cards that he or she may have played, and play then reverts to the correct person. The rule "Illegal Draw" may apply.

=== Illegal Draw ===
If a player sees a card to which they are not entitled by playing out of turn or by drawing more than one card from the top of the stock pile, that card is placed face up on top of the stock pile. The next player in turn may either take the card or have it placed face down in the center of the stock pile and proceed to play as if no irregularity had occurred. If more than one card is so exposed at the top of the stock pile, the option of each player in turn is only to take the top such card remaining there, or the top face-down card of the stock pile, or the previous player's discard. That is, players have three options to draw from instead of the normal two for as long as exposed cards remain at the top of the stock pile.

A player's illegal draw may not be corrected after discarding, but the section on Incorrect Hand may apply.

=== Premature discard ===
Any player who discards without drawing may then draw from the stock pile to restore their hand to the proper number of cards, but he or she may not lay down any cards after discarding. If the next player in turn has already drawn, the section on Incorrect Hand applies. A player who discards more than one card may retract either one, unless the next player has drawn it or unless the next player has already ended their turn.

=== Incorrect hand ===
- A player with too many cards discards without drawing.
- A player with too few cards draws without discarding; one card in each turn until the player's hand is restored to the correct number. This also applies to a player who draws too many cards and adds them to their hand before correction is required.
- A player may not lay down any cards in a turn when the hand is still incorrect.
- If, after a player goes out, another player has too many cards, they simply count the value of all cards in the hand.
- If a player has too few cards, they are charged 10 points for each missing card.
- If any player goes out and is found to have too few cards, they take back all cards that were laid down in that turn, and play continues.

=== Re-deal ===
There must be a re-deal by the same dealer if more than one card is exposed in dealing or if more than one card is found face up in the pack. A player who is dealt an incorrect number of cards may demand a re-deal before drawing in their first turn, but not after that. There must be a re-deal at any time it is discovered that the pack is incorrect, but the results of previous deals are not affected.

=== Cards laid down illegally ===
Any cards which are superfluous in an otherwise correct set or run must be returned to the original player's hand as soon as they are discovered. Any cards that may have been added to the incorrect set or run remain on the table. Play then proceeds as if no irregularity had occurred.

=== Scoring errors ===
An error in scoring a hand may not be corrected after that hand has been mixed with other cards. However, if an error in scoring is discovered when there had previously been no dispute, an agreed upon correction may be made at any time.

=== Strategy ===
The game is won by whoever has the highest points at the end. The main aim for every player is to show the game as early as possible to get maximum points.

An important aspect of this variation is "values" i.e. wildcards. A major part of scoring will comprise points scored in "value". Every players must watch what other players are discarding, especially the players who have seen the joker, as they will never discard a joker or wildcard and also will always pick jokers and wildcards from discard pile.
