= Tonk (card game) =

Matching card game

- Origin: United States
- Alternative names: Tunk
- Type: Matching
- Players: 2–4
- Skills: Strategy
- Cards: 52 (plus two jokers)
- Deck: Anglo-American
- Play: Clockwise
- Playing time: 5–15 minutes
- Chance: Medium

Related games
- Conquian

Tonk, or tunk, is a matching card game, which combines features of knock rummy and conquian. Tonk is a relatively fast-paced game that can be played by 2–4 players. It can be played for just points or for money wagered.

It was popular with blues and jazz musicians in southern Louisiana in the 1930s, including Duke Ellington's orchestra, and was played during breaks in the back rooms of bars and saloons. It has been played in military barracks to the battlefield and In many other places it has become a popular pastime for workers while on their lunch breaks.

== Description ==
Tonk is usually played for money wagered (with a stake agreed on before each game starts). Each player pays the stake to the winner of the hand. Games typically involve two to four players. Stakes may be any amount. A game consists of several hands. The players take turns dealing.

A standard fifty-two card deck (plus two jokers) is used. The jokers are wild and can be played as any card needed by the player who's lucky enough to get one of the jokers.

== Play ==
Players are dealt five, seven, or nine cards, depending on the number of players, in turn. The dealer turns up the first of the un-dealt cards as the start of the discard pile. In some variations, the dealer does not turn up the first card; the discard pile is started after the first player draws. The remaining un-dealt cards are set face down in a stack next to the discard pile. These form the stock.

The goal of play is to get rid of one's cards by forming them into spreads. A spread is three or four identical cards (such as three 5's or four queens), or three or more in a row of the same suit. A player may add cards to their own or another's spread. The winner is the first to get rid of all their cards, or the player with the fewest points when play is stopped.

Play stops when a player gets rid of all their cards, or when a player drops, by laying their cards face up on the table. Depending on the variation, a player may drop at any point in the game, including right after the cards are dealt, or only before drawing. When a player drops, all the players likewise lay their cards face up. The player with the fewest points in their hand is the winner. If the player who dropped does not have the fewest points, they must pay the stake to each player with fewer points: this is called being caught. In addition, each player pays the stake to the winner. If there is a tie, both players are paid. If the tie is between the player who dropped and another player, the one who dropped is considered caught and must pay double, with the other player being the sole winner.

If the player does not drop, they must take the top card from the discard pile or draw a card from the stock. The player may then lay face up any spreads, or add to any spreads on the table. If after this the player has no more cards, they say "tonk" and win, and each player pays them a double stake. Some play that a player must spread with six cards to tonk, otherwise the player goes out with zero effectively ending the game but only winning a single stake.

If the player has one or more cards remaining, they must discard one card to the discard pile. If this is their last card, play ends: they are the winner, and each player pays them the stake. If the player has one or more cards left in their hand after discarding, their turn ends.

If the stock runs out, play stops. The player with the fewest points in their hand wins, and is paid the stake by each player. If two or more players tie the hand is a draw, and another hand is dealt.

Many variations in play are possible.

=== Melding ===
Players can meld sets (three of the same rank card) or runs (three consecutive cards in the same suit, e.g. 9♦ 10♦ J♦). Aces are low.

=== Hitting ===
Hitting is a variation of the common laying off of another player's meld (i.e.: hitting an opponent's set of three 10s with the other 10). The card is put with the melds of the player who is receiving the hit. However, when a player "hits" another player, the player receiving the hit cannot lay down for one turn. Multiple hits result in additional loss of lay downs for turns thereafter. After a player has hit another player, the hitting player is allowed to discard a card from their hand. Once a player's set has been hit and the four cards of that rank are melded, they can be thrown into the discard pile.

Players cannot spread out.

=== Tonking out (doubles) ===
Tonking out is the preferred method of winning the game. It is achieved by melding or hitting until no cards remain in the player's hand. The difference between tonking out and running out is that when a player tonks out, they use all six cards in either a spread or by hitting multiple times. When a player "runs out", they use five cards and discard one. When a game is played for money, tonking out usually results in a double payment.

Tonk out double: In some variations, usually two-player, a player who "tonks out" with a run that subsequently allows the other player to tonk out on those cards results in a "double-double". For example, a player holding 5♥ and 6♥ draws the 7♥ and tonks out, while the remaining player is holding 8♥ and 9♥ and tonks out as a result of the other player's hand, resulting in a "double-double", meaning the wager would be increased by four times. So a wager of $1 for running out would be $2 for tonking out (doubles), and $4 for a double-double.

=== High count or low count ===
Some house rules include a provision that a player wins the game automatically if they are dealt a hand count of 49 or 50. Another variation states that 50 is automatic but 49 must be played in turn. This means that if a player goes down before it is the turn of the player who has 49, that player no longer wins. Another says that when dealt the ace is worth 10 points.

Some house rules include a provision that a player wins the game automatically if dealt a hand count of 13 or under, and is paid double. Some house rules state that a hand of 9 or under is an automatic win and is paid triple.

=== Only run is a spread ===
Another house rule states players may add a card from their hand only to tabled runs, not on three of a kind. This rule is attributed to John P. Speno, inspired by writer Glen Cook's The Black Company.

== See also ==
- Gin rummy
- Rummy
- Rumino
- Tong-its
