= Meld (cards) =

In card games, a set of matching cards

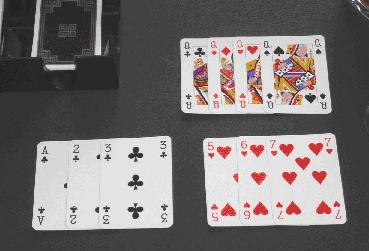
A series of melds: a set of four queens, a run of A♣ 2♣ 3♣ and a run of 5♥ 6♥ 7♥

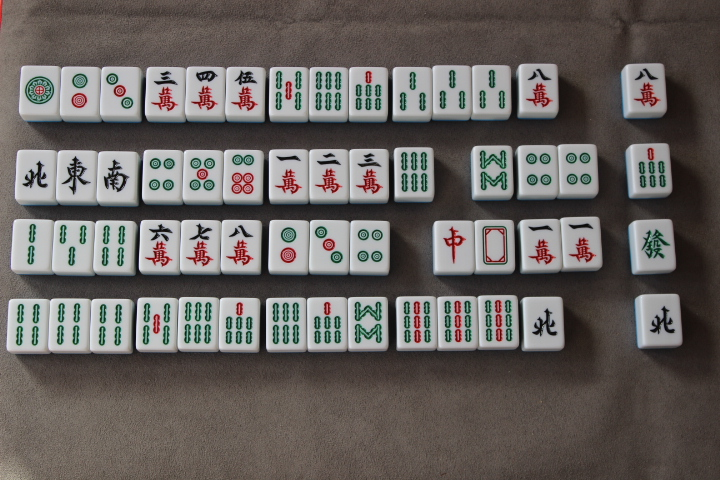
Mahjong tiles organized into melds

In card games, a meld is a set of matching cards, typically three or more, that earn a player points and/or allow them to deplete their hand. Melds typically come in sequences of ascending cards belonging to the same suit known as runs (8♠ 9♠ 10♠) or sets/groups of cards of identical rank (8♠ 8♣ 8♥). Other ones may be marriage (e.g. K♥ and Q♥) and bezique (Q♠ and J♦).

Melding is typical in games of the rummy family, such as canasta and gin.

It is also used in other games such as mahjong. Melds are also made in some trick-taking games, such as pinochle and bezique.

== See also ==
- Run (cards)
- Set (cards)

== Bibliography ==
- Parlett, David. The Penguin Book of Card Games. London: Penguin (2008). ISBN 978-0-141-03787-5.
