= Chinchón (card game) =

Matching card game

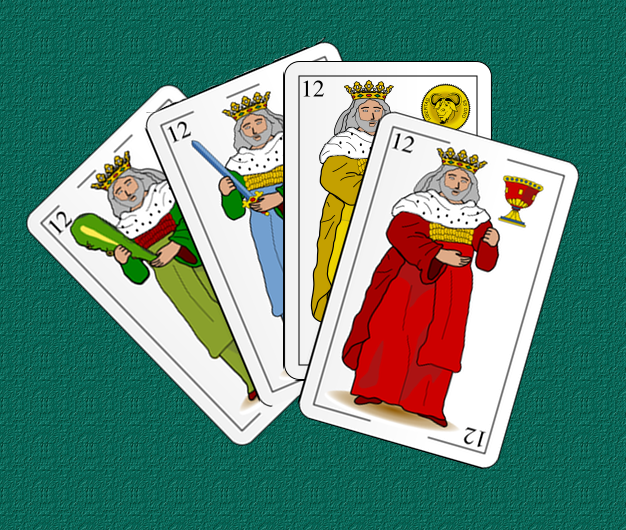
- Origin: Spain
- Type: Matching
- Players: 2-4
- Skills: Attention, Memory
- Cards: 50
- Deck: Spanish
- Rank (high→low): 12 11 10 9 8 7 6 5 4 3 2 1
- Play: Clockwise
- Playing time: 20 min
- Chance: Low-Moderate

Related games
- Conquian

Chinchón is a matching card game played in Spain, Uruguay, Argentina, Cape Verde and other places. It is a close variant of gin rummy, with which it shares the same objective: making sets, groups or runs, of matching cards.

The name is spelled Txintxon in Basque and in Cape Verdean Creole (the latter also features the alternate spellings txin-txon, tchintchom or tchintchon). In Uruguay, the game is called Conga or La Conga.

== Game rules ==
The game of Chinchón is played with a Spanish 40 or 48-card pack. The rules of the game are very similar to those of Gin Rummy, almost identical to Rumino. Seven cards are dealt to each player, and the remaining cards of the pack are laid on the table face down to form the stock. The top card of this pile is then turned face up and laid beside the stock to start the discard pile. The players look at and sort their cards, and then play by turns. Each turn consists of a draw and a discard:

- One card is taken from the top of either the stock (face down) pile or the discard (face up) pile, and added to the player's hand.
- The player can then try to make combinations from the hand with the new card. Each combination in the hand must have at least 3 cards, and may be a set (cards of the same rank) or a run, that is, sequential cards of the same suit.
- After that, one card must be discarded from the player's hand and placed on top of the discard pile face up, so that the player always has seven cards in hand.
- Some variations allow the use of 2 Jokers as wild cards.

A player who has enough combinations may decide to meld hand cards, laying them off onto the table, whereupon the round ends. That can be done when the player thinks that the value of their unmatched cards, called "deadwood" in Rummy, is less than that of the other players. Each of the players scores penalty points equivalent to the sum of the face value of the unmatched cards left in the hand. If a player has no unmatched cards, that is 'Gin', they earn a bonus of -10 points. A player automatically wins the game if they manage to make a run of 7 cards, called chinchón. If the game includes Jokers as wild cards, a run with a Joker doesn't count as a true chinchón and doesn't win the game, but still allows the -10 points bonus.

When one of the players reaches 100 or more, the game ends, and the player with the lowest score wins.

== Variations ==
=== Conga ===
In Uruguay, Conga ends when only one player remaining has less than 100 points, as all other players with more than 100 can "reenganchar" with the player that has the highest score under 100. Also, players can only meld their cards if they have 5 or less points in their hand, unless their score is 96 or more, as melding requires staying in the game at 100 or less. Also, when the game starts, all but the one to the right of the dealer receive 7 cards, the one to the right is the "Mano" (The hand) and that player receives an eighth card, to which they place the least convenient card in their hand, next to the face-down deck, thus starting the game with a single card already for selection, which is commonly a 12.

== See also ==
- Desmoche
- Continental Rummy
- Biriba
