= Carioca (card game) =

Chilean card game

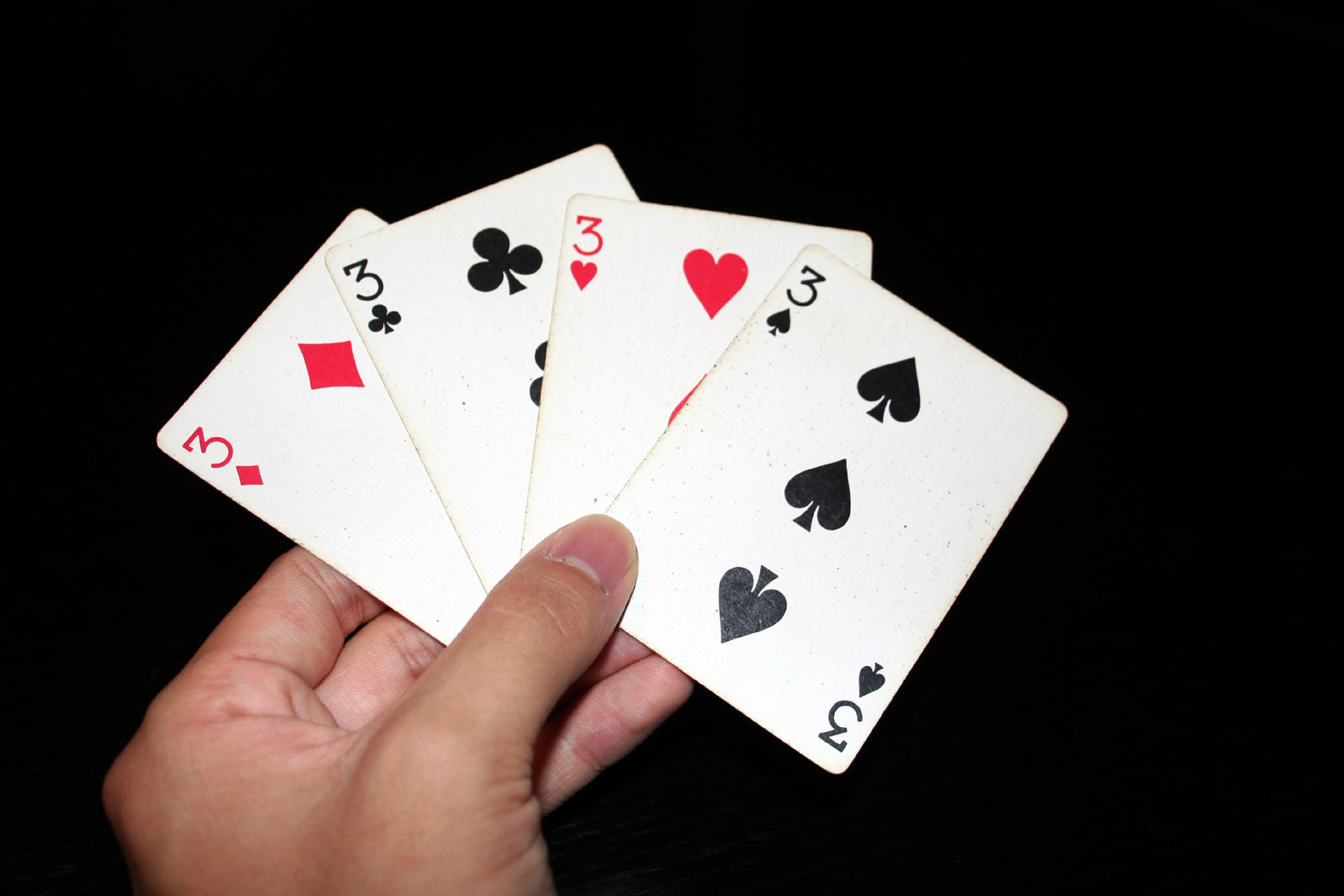
- A "meld" of four cards in Carioca
- Origin: Chile
- Type: Matching
- Players: 2+
- Cards: 108
- Deck: Anglo-American
- Play: Counter-clockwise
- Playing time: 15 min.

Related games
- Continental Rummy, Contract Rummy

Carioca is a Chilean variation of Continental Rummy. It is also played in Argentina and Uruguay. The variation described below is Perla's Cariocas.

== Perla's Cariocas ==
=== Objective ===
The objective of the game is to finish with the smallest number of points, like Golf.

=== Rules ===
1. Two decks of cards with two jokers are used (108 cards total)
2. The cards are shuffled and each player takes a card from the top. The player that draws the lowest card (aces high) gets to cut the deck.
3. The person seated to the right shuffles the card and lets the person to the left cut the deck.
4. The dealer deals to the person to the right of him/her first and around accordingly.
5. In the next round, the dealer becomes the deck cutter.
6. The person who cuts the deck tries to cut the deck such that it is exactly the number of the cards to be dealt plus one to start the discard pile. Eleven cards are dealt to each player (except in the last round when thirteen are dealt), so if four people were playing the player would want to cut the deck such that 45 cards are left for the dealer. The other half of the cut deck starts the pile from which players draw cards. If the player cuts perfectly, they receive -10 points.
7. There are eight rounds. Each round requires that players construct predefined hands in the order shown below under Rounds.
8. The round is started when the player to the right of the dealer draws from the deck or the discard pile.
  1. A player may 'steal' the card in the discard pile if all of the players to the left of him/her pass. 2 points are added to the player's score for 'stealing' a card.
9. When a player constructs all of the specified hands for the round, he/she can lower the hands. If he/she manages to lower the hands and not be left with any cards at the same time, he/she has gone out and is awarded -30 points. If a player manages to discard all of his/her cards in multiple turns, he/she is awarded 0 points. Players can add to other players hands only after they have lowered theirs.
10. When one player has discarded all of his/her cards, the other players must add up the values of their cards (according to the Card Values given below) and they are penalized that number of points.
- Red aces are considered jokers in addition to the two standard jokers.

=== Hands ===
- Straights/Stairs: a straight flush consisting of at least four cards (i.e. at least four sequential cards of the same suit). Aces can be high or low but cannot be between Kings and Twos.
- Three-of-a-kind/Legs: three of a kind (i.e. at least three cards of the same face value but different suits).

=== Card Values ===
- 2 of any card = 2 points
- 3 of any card = 3 points
- 4 of any card = 4 points
- 5 of any card = 5 points
- 6 of any card = 6 points
- 7 of any card = 7 points
- 8 of any card = 8 points
- 9 of any card = 9 points
- 10 of any card = 10 points
- J of any card = 10 points
- Q of any card = 10 points
- K of any card = 10 points
- A of any card = 15 points
- Joker = 25 points

Variation: Any card between 2 and 9 = 5 points

=== Round ===
1. Two three-of-a-kind (6)
2. One straight, one three-of-a-kind (7)
3. Two straights (8)
4. Three three-of-a-kind (9)
5. Two three-of-a-kind, One straight (10)
6. Two straights, One three-of-a-kind (11)
7. Four three-of-a-kind* (12)
8. Three straights* (12)
- *It's optional to play one or the two of the

=== Rounds in other variations ===
- Four three-of-a-kind (12)
  - Played after round 6 above

The following may be played after round 7 above:

- Crazy straight (13) (straight consisting in thirteen cards, every flush or suit, you can use joker)
- Colour straight (13) (straight consisting in thirteen cards, only one colour, red or black, cannot use joker)
- Royal straight (13) (straight consisting in thirteen cards, one suit, spades(♠), hearts(♥), diamonds(♦) or clubs(♣), cannot use joker)

== See also ==
- Kalooki
- Rumino
