= Shanghai rum =

Rummy card game played with 3-8 players

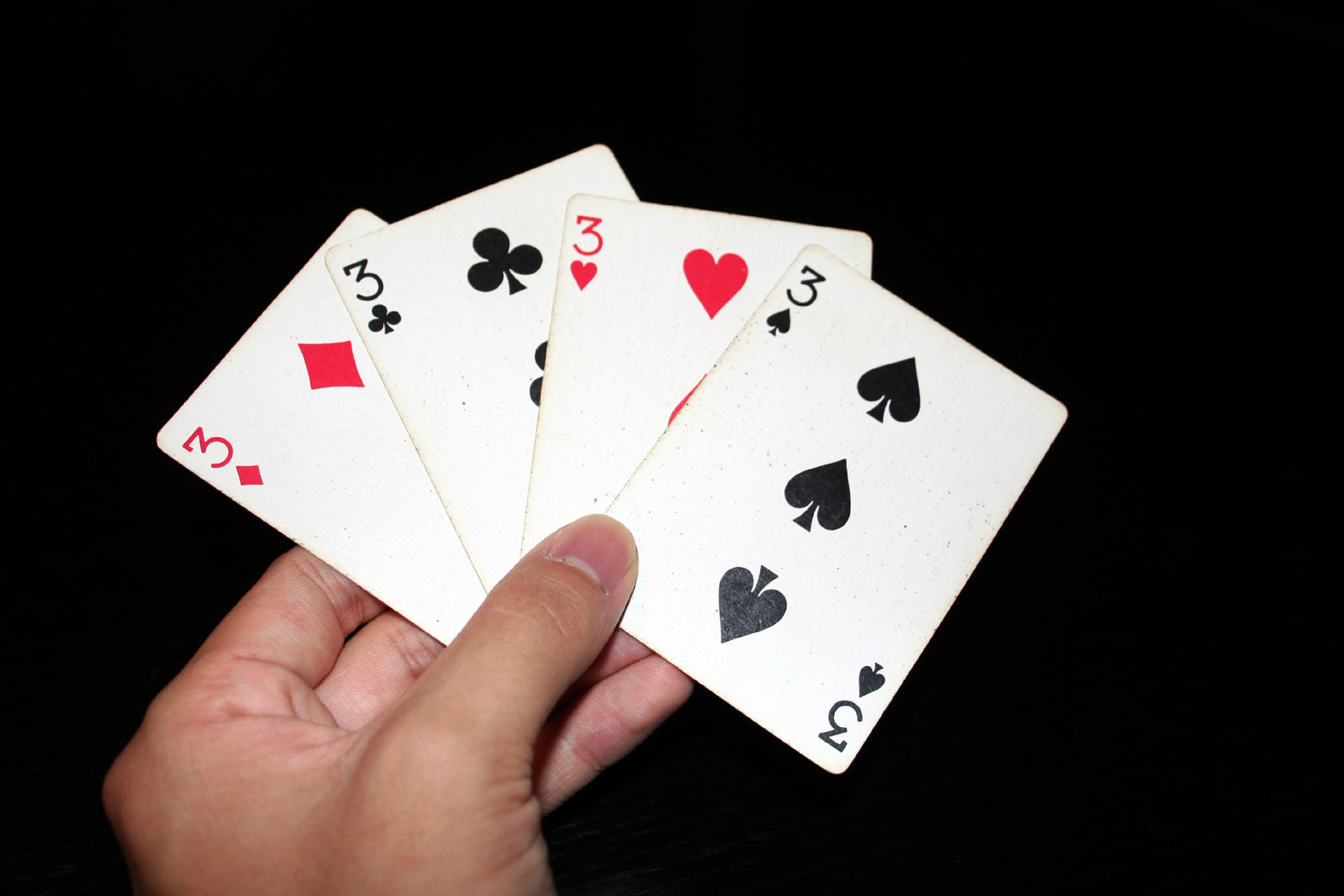
- A meld of four cards in the game Shanghai rum
- Origin: Chinese
- Alternative names: Shanghai rummy, California rummy
- Family: Matching
- Players: 2-8
- Skills: Strategy
- Cards: 2-4 54 cards
- Deck: French
- Rank (high→low): A K Q J 10 9 8 7 6 5 4 3 2
- Play: Clockwise
- Playing time: 2 hours
- Chance: Medium

Related games
- Gin Rummy, Contract rummy

Shanghai Rum or (California rummy) is a playing card game, adapted from gin rummy and a variation of Contract rummy played by 3 to 8 players. The game emerged in China.

== Game Rules ==
=== Basics ===
Shanghai Rummy is played with multiple decks of 54 standard playing cards, including the jokers. Two decks of 52 regular player cards plus 2 jokers are required for a match of up to four players. If there are five or six players, three decks are traditionally required.

Aces are high (above a King) only. Each game has ten hands, and the rules for each hand are unique. One person begins as dealer for the first hand, and then the person to the dealer's left becomes dealer for the next hand, and so on. Each player is dealt eleven cards for each of the ten rounds. The rest of the deck is then placed face down in the middle of the players; this is referred to as the deck. One card is taken from the top of the deck and placed face up next to it. This card is called the upcard and becomes the beginning of the discard pile.

Each player has a choice at the beginning of their turn. They may either pick up one new card from the top of the deck or take the upcard. (Also, the other players in the game have the ability to get the upcard.) After the player draws their card, either from the deck or the upcard, they must then choose any card in their hand to discard, and they then place this card face up on the discard pile. That card then becomes the new upcard, which the next player in turn can take or other players can buy. To get a card that isn't yours a player must say, “BUY", before the next player draws their card, or else it is already considered "dead". Once a player discards their card, the card underneath that card is now considered a "dead" card because it is no longer in the game. Players may not take these cards. If a player purchases the top card, the cards below from previous rounds remain “dead”.

=== Jokers ===
Jokers are treated as wild cards and can be played in the place of any card. A player is not allowed to have more jokers than face-cards in either a set or run. An example of this would be if one is trying to get a set one must have three or more cards of the same rank (8/8/8). But if a player has a joker or 2 they could play in place of an 8 (8/8/joker). But a player cannot lay more jokers than face-cards (8/joker/joker). However they may lay the same number of jokers as face-cards (8/8/joker/joker). The same applies for runs. If a player has laid down and has a joker in a run or set, the joker can be replaced by the appropriate card by any player. If a player who has not laid down yet replaces any joker they must lay down their meld in that turn, but if the player has already laid down their meld they may take the joker and use it how they choose anytime.

=== Buying ===
A "buy" is when an out-of-turn player takes the upcard, draws 2 extra cards from the stock, and cannot play the cards immediately, but must wait for their turn. If more than one player wants it, the one closest to the dealer's left has precedence. There is a limit to the number of buys allowed. Each player is only allowed 3 buys per hand in the first 8 rounds. During rounds 9 and 10, each player is allowed 4 buys per hand.

=== Melding ===
The object of each hand is to come up with the correct combination of cards to be able to meld, or "lay out". The combination for each hand is different, and they become more difficult with each subsequent hand. The combinations for each hand are either sets or runs (sequence) or a combination of both. A set is a combination of a specific number of cards of the same rank, and the suit is not important. An example of a "set of 3" is three cards that are all 8's, and the 8's can all be of different suits. A run is a combination of a specific number of cards of the same suit that have consecutive ranks. An example of a "run of 4" is the 4, 5, 6, and 7 of clubs. An example of a combination for a hand is for hand #2, "1 set of 3 and 1 run of 4." This means that a player must have both a set of 3 cards and a run of 4 cards in their hand before they can meld. A set needs a minimum of 3 cards while a run needs a minimum of 4 cards. A player can meld only when it is their turn. As always, they must start their hand by drawing a card, then when they have the correct sequence of cards, they can meld or "go down." They do so by laying their meld cards face up on the table in their correct sequence. After melding, a player can then play on the melds of other players. When done, they must then discard.

=== Play for the player who has gone down ===
When a player is "down" (meaning they have already melded), they still take their turn in turn with the other players, and they still must draw a card and discard. However, a player who is down cannot buy a card, nor can they stop a player from buying the top card in the discard pile when it is their turn. A player who is down can play their cards on the melds that have been completed either by themself or by other players. For example, if a player has laid down a set of 8's, and on a subsequent turn they then draw another 8, they can play this 8 on their set of 8's. They do this by placing the 8 with the set of 8's. If they have a card that they would like to play on a run, they must be sure to keep the order of the run. For example, if there is a run of 5 consisting of 4-5-6-7-8 of clubs, the player can play a 3 of clubs or a 9 of clubs.

=== Winning the game ===
Play progresses until the final hand when one of the players "goes out," meaning they are able to play the last card in their hand. Although players may discard throughout the game, to win they must be able to lay down all of their cards without discarding. In order to win, on a player's turn they must be able to draw a card and then go out without a discard. The winner of the hand gets zero points, and the other players count their cards to determine their score for the hand. After all ten hands are played, the winner is the player with the lowest score.

The point values for the cards are: 3s–9s: 5 points 10s-Kings: 10 points Aces: 15 points 2s= 20 Points Joker: 25 points

== Sequence of hands ==
10 cards = 3 sets of 3

11 cards = 2 sets of 3, 1 run of 4

12 cards = 1 set of 3, 2 runs of 4

13 cards = 3 runs of 4

13 cards = 4 sets of 3

14 cards = 3 sets of 3, 1 run of 4

15 cards = 2 sets of 3, 2 runs of 4

16 cards = 3 runs of 4, 1 set of 3

17 cards = 4 runs of 4
