= Kalooki =

Card game

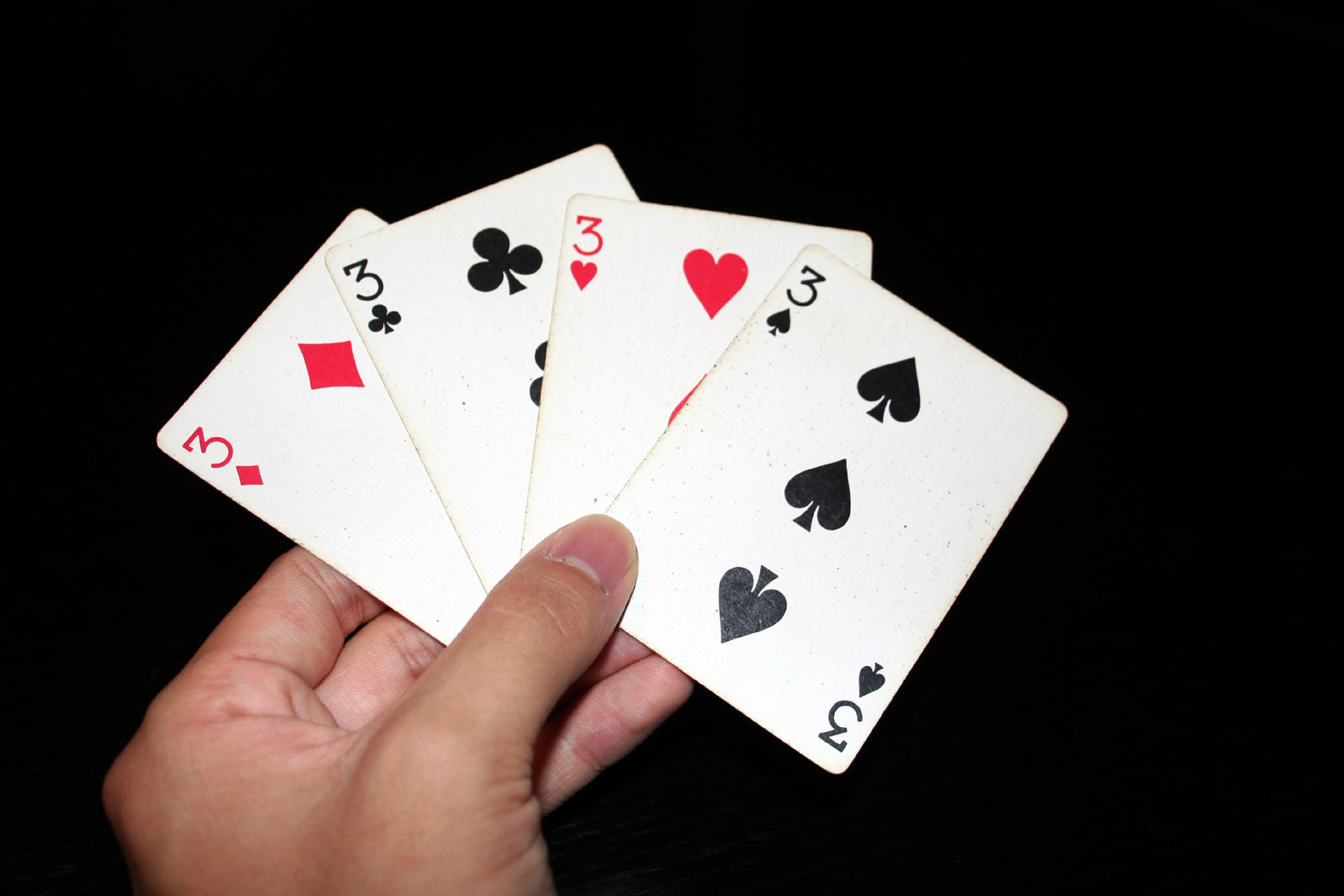
- A set of threes in the
- Origin: Jamaica
- Players: 3–8
- Skills: Strategy
- Cards: 2–4 packs plus jokers
- Deck: Anglo-American
- Play: Clockwise
- Playing time: 2–6 hours
- Chance: Medium

Kalooki or Kaluki is a card game popularly played in Jamaica. It is sometimes called Jamaican Rummy for similarities in structure the game bears with Contract Rummy or Gin Rummy. The games are, however, different and not to be confused.

These are the rules for the original Kalooki game created, refined, and taught by flight attendants of Air Jamaica in the 1970s and 80s. There are a few variations of the game described in books and on the internet. A similar game is sometimes referred to as "Kalooki 40".

== Players and cards ==
There are usually three to eight players; tournaments are played with four players at each table. Two or more packs of cards are used, depending on the number of players.

No. of Players	No. of Packs	No. of Jokers
3–4	2	4–6
5–6	3	8
7–8	4	10

The object of the game is to go out by laying down all of the player's cards. The point values of the cards left in a player's hand when someone goes out are:

Card	Points
Joker	50
Black Ace	15
King, Queen, Jack	10
2 to 10	face value
Red Ace	1

== Sets ==
A "3" is a set of three or more cards of the same rank, such as 5-5-5 or K-K-K-K-K. The suits of the cards do not matter and duplicates are allowed.

A "4" is a run of four or more consecutive cards in the same suit, such as spade7-spade8-spade9-spade10-spadeJ. Aces can be high or low, regardless of their point value, but they cannot be in the middle of a run, so A-2-3-4 and J-Q-K-A are valid, but Q-K-A-2-3 is not.

When more than one "4" is put down by one player, they must be of different suits, and when more than one "3" is put down by one player, they must be of different ranks. In games where three sets of "4" are required a full suit can be used to substitute.

Jokers can be used as wild cards to substitute for any card with the restriction that they are not allowed to 'kiss'. This rule can be further explained as follows:

- In a "4" jokers cannot be used for consecutive cards - so club9-Joker-clubJ-Joker is OK but club9-Joker-Joker-clubQ is not.
- In a "3" there must be at least two genuine (non-joker) cards, so 4-4-Joker and 7-Joker-7-Joker are OK, but 9-Joker-Joker or Joker-9-Joker are not.

Jokers cannot be removed from their set. However, when a joker is used in a "4" it can be moved up, in that set, by the holder of the real card that it represents (see tacking below), provided that two jokers do not end up side by side. Once a joker moves as far up in a set as it can go it can no longer move. A player may not add jokers to sets laid by other players. They may only place jokers on their own sets.

== Deal and contracts ==
Players take turns to deal the cards. Nine hands (deals) make up a game, and the winner is the player who has the lowest cumulative score at the end of the game. The cards are dealt out one at a time. The number of cards dealt to each player depends on the hand being played as shown in the table below. After all players have been dealt their cards, the next card is turned face up to start the discards pile, and the remaining undealt cards are stacked face down beside it to form the stock.

In each hand, there is a contract or quota of 3s and 4s that a player must lay down:

Hand No.	Cards dealt	Contract
1	9	3, 3, 3
2	10	3, 3, 4
3	11	3, 4, 4
4	12	4, 4, 4
5	12	3, 3, 3, 3
6	13	3, 3, 3, 4
7	14	3, 3, 4, 4 (colloquially called "half and half")
8	15	3, 4, 4, 4
9	16	4, 4, 4, 4

Some players deal 12 cards each in the first three hands, rather than 9, 10 and 11. In some circles hands 1–4 are referred to as the Kalooki game while hands 5–9 are referred to as Super Kalooki. Most people play Kalooki as hands 1–9.

Baby Kalooki hands and contracts are:

Hand No.	Cards dealt	Contract
1	6	3, 3
2	7	3, 4
3	8	4, 4

Some players deal 8 cards for each hand of Baby Kalooki. This is the main format for learning the game.

== Play ==
The player to the dealer's left begins and the turn to play passes clockwise. A player's turn consists of:

1. The pluck: drawing one card from the top card of the face-down stock or the top of the discard pile;
2. The lay: optionally laying down some cards. The first lay must be the complete contract for the game, then the player is free to add cards to any of the sets laid on the table. When the player has finished their lay, or if they are not able to lay, they move on to;
3. The discard: discarding any one card (other than a joker) face up on the discard pile.

=== Calling ===
If a player has not yet laid down any cards and wants to take a card discarded by another player when it is not their turn to play next, they can call the card by saying (or shouting) "CALL". The player whose turn it is to play has two options:

1. Allow the call. The player whose turn it is gives the top discard to the player who called it. The calling player takes the discard and must also draw one penalty card from the stock, but cannot lay down any cards or discard at this time. The caller will from now on have two extra cards in their hand. The play then reverts to the player whose turn was interrupted by the call, who must now draw from the stock, and continue the turn in the usual way.
2. Refuse the call. If the player whose turn it is has not yet laid down, they have the right to take the discard for themselves, rather than giving it to the caller and drawing from the stock; the call then has no effect.

Calling is subject to the following rules:

- If several people try to call the same card, the person who calls first gets the card, assuming that the person whose turn it is allows the call. The person whose turn it is, is responsible to determine who called first.
- No one can call a card before it reaches the table.
- Once a player plucks from the stock the previously discarded card is "dead" and cannot be called.
- Each player is allowed a maximum of three calls per contract hand (deal). Since each call adds two cards to a player's hand, the player can check how many calls they have made by counting the cards in their hand.
- A player who has laid down cards can no longer call.

=== Laying ===
The first cards a player lays down must satisfy the contract for the game being played. There is no point requirement as in some other versions of Rummy. The player places these cards face up in front of them, where they stay for the rest of the hand. If there are other sets on the table they may tack on cards as appropriate (see tacking below) and then discard as usual.

A player who has laid their hand is no longer allowed to take cards from the discard pile. When a player has laid their hand they can no longer call for a discard, and in their turn they must draw from the stock. If another player calls in their turn, the first player must allow the call, unless they have already cleared the stock with their pluck, in which case the discarded card is already dead.

If a player lays downs all their cards and comes out before any other player coming down, that is called “down and out” and all other players have to double their points in that contract.

=== Tacking ===
After laying down the contracted sets, the player is allowed to lay down additional appropriate cards to any of the sets laid on the table, in the same turn, or in later turns of the same hand. This is called tacking on or laying off. Further cards of the same rank can be tacked onto a "3". A "4" can be extended by tacking on the next higher or lower card in sequence. When the suit is complete no further tacking is possible.

Jokers may be replaced by a tacked card in a set of "4" and must ascend to its new position immediately. A Joker may not be moved to facilitate a tack i.e. for a set of "4" - club-9, club-10, club-J, Joker; the Joker can be moved up to club-K to facilitate the tacking of club-Q. However, the Joker cannot be moved to the club-8 position to facilitate the tacking of club-7.

Jokers may only be tacked onto a player's own laid sets.

No player may tack cards until after they have laid their contract.

=== Discarding ===
Jokers cannot be discarded, but apart from that there is no restriction on what card may be discarded from a hand at the end of a player's turn. It is legal to discard a card that could be tacked onto a set on the table, and it is legal to discard the same card that the player just picked up, if they find it is in their interest to do so.

It sometimes happens that the entire stock is used up before any player has gone out. If this happens, the discard pile, except for its top card, is reshuffled and placed face down to form a new stock. Play continues as before. If the stock runs out a second time, which may happen if players are holding back the key cards needed by others to lay down their contracts, the play ends with no score. All the cards are thrown in, shuffled and dealt again by the same dealer and the play is restarted (playing for the same contract).

== Scoring ==
As soon as a player goes out by getting rid of all their cards, the hand ends for all players. The other players count the total value of the cards they have in their hands (see above) and add the result to their cumulative point total.

If the first player laying manages to go out on the same turn that they first lay down cards, this is known as down and out or bending the table, and the other players score double points for that game, known as being 'doubled up'.

At the end of nine hands, the player who has the lowest cumulative score is the winner.

=== Penalties ===
It sometimes happens that a player will carelessly, or calculatingly, call more than three times in one hand. This can be verified by counting the cards that the player is holding. Another player may challenge this over-caller by verbally saying "CHALLENGE" and identifying the player they wish to challenge. If over-calling is discovered, the player is given 50 points for each over-call. If the challenger is wrong they receive a 50-point penalty. Once a player has started the play (plucked) where they successfully lay their cards on the table they cannot be challenged for an over-call.

If a player lays incorrectly and is discovered before the end of their play (discard), they are required to pick up the hand and take a 50-point penalty, unless they are able to rearrange the hand successfully to complete the contract. If an incorrect lay is discovered after the discard it remains.

Every play starts with a pluck and ends with a discard. If a player fails to begin their play with a pluck or end their play with a discard, including when laying their hand, there is a 50-point penalty.

Other usual infractions which may incur 50-point penalties (according to house rules):

- Resting cards on the table which should still be in hand
- Exposing cards when not laying (accidentally or deliberately)
- Attempting to discard a joker

=== Bonuses ===
If the dealer of a hand can successfully cut exactly the correct number of cards to be dealt for that hand, they receive a bonus of -50 points.

== Tuluki (Kaluki for two players) ==
Sometimes there are only two people who want to play Kaluki, but it is boring. There is no calling, and every time a player lays it is a double up. Tuluki is a variant that adds excitement to a two player game. All the rules of Kaluki apply except for the discard.

The discard has two parts:

- The discard - When player A discards, player B does not automatically get the card. They must call it if they want it and take a penalty card.
- The flip card - Player A then flips the card on the top of the deck. Player B gets this card automatically if they want it or if it is a joker. Player A can call the flip card and take it with a penalty card if Player B allows.

Play then continues as usual.

== See also ==
- Rummy
- Gin rummy
- Contract rummy
- Conquian
- Khanhoo
