= Chinchón (disambiguation) =

Chinchón is a town in Spain.

Chinchón or Chinchon may also refer to:

- Chinchón (card game)
- Chinchón (mountain), Peru
- Count of Chinchón
- Castle of Chinchón, a castle in Spain

== See also ==
- Cinchona (disambiguation)
