= Counting Patience =

Card game

Counting Patience is a simple patience game that can be played with a French Skat pack of 32 cards or a standard French pack of 52 cards.

== Play mode ==
Like most patiences, counting patiences are card games for one person.

=== Counting Patience with 32 cards ===
In simple Counting Patience, the cards of a shuffled Skat pack of 32 cards are used. Alternatively a shortened pack is used by removing the Twos, Threes, Fours, Fives and Sixes from a standard pack. The cards are placed face up in four rows of eight cards each. The rows are now counted starting with the top row according to the normal card order of seven - eight - nine - ten - jack - queen - king - ace. If the value counted matches the corresponding card (regardless of suit), it is removed from the row and set aside.

Example row:

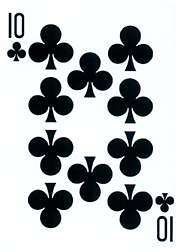
Seven

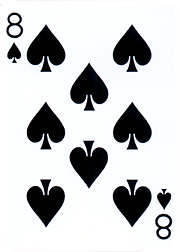
Eight

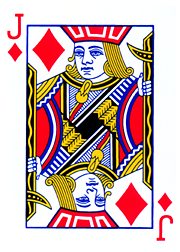
Nine

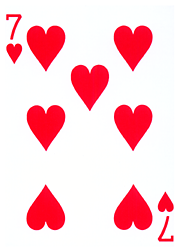
Ten

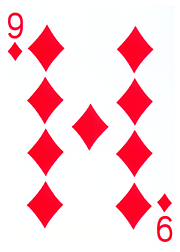
Jack

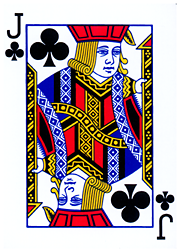
Queen

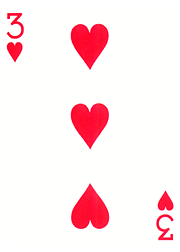
King

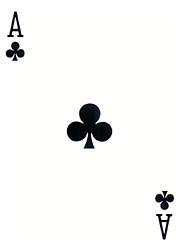
Ace

The Eight of Spades and Ace of Clubs are set aside

When the player arrives at the end of the fourth row, he starts again from the beginning, counts down again and removes matching cards. Any gaps that arise may be closed up. The patience is won when all the cards are discarded by counting.

=== Counting Patience with 52 cards ===
The playing cards, a simple Rommé 52-card pack, are shuffled and placed face down as a stack (talon) in front of the player. The cards are then turned up one at a time and the sequence of cards Ace - Two - Three - ... - Ten - Jack - Queen - King is counted out in parallel. If the count matches the face-up card (regardless of its suit), it is set aside. After the first round, the talon is shuffled and played through two more times without the discarded cards. The patience is won if at the end of the third round all the cards have been set aside - if this does not succeed, the patience does not come out and is lost. If not a single card can be set aside in the first round, the solitaire is lost at the end of that round.

== Literature ==
- "Abzähl-Patience." und "Abzähl-Patience mit Pfiff." In: Irmgard Wolter-Rosendorf: Patiencen in Wort und Bild. Falken-Verlag, 1994; pp. 9–10. ISBN 3-8068-2003-1.
