= Viennese Rummy =

Card game

- Wiener Rummy
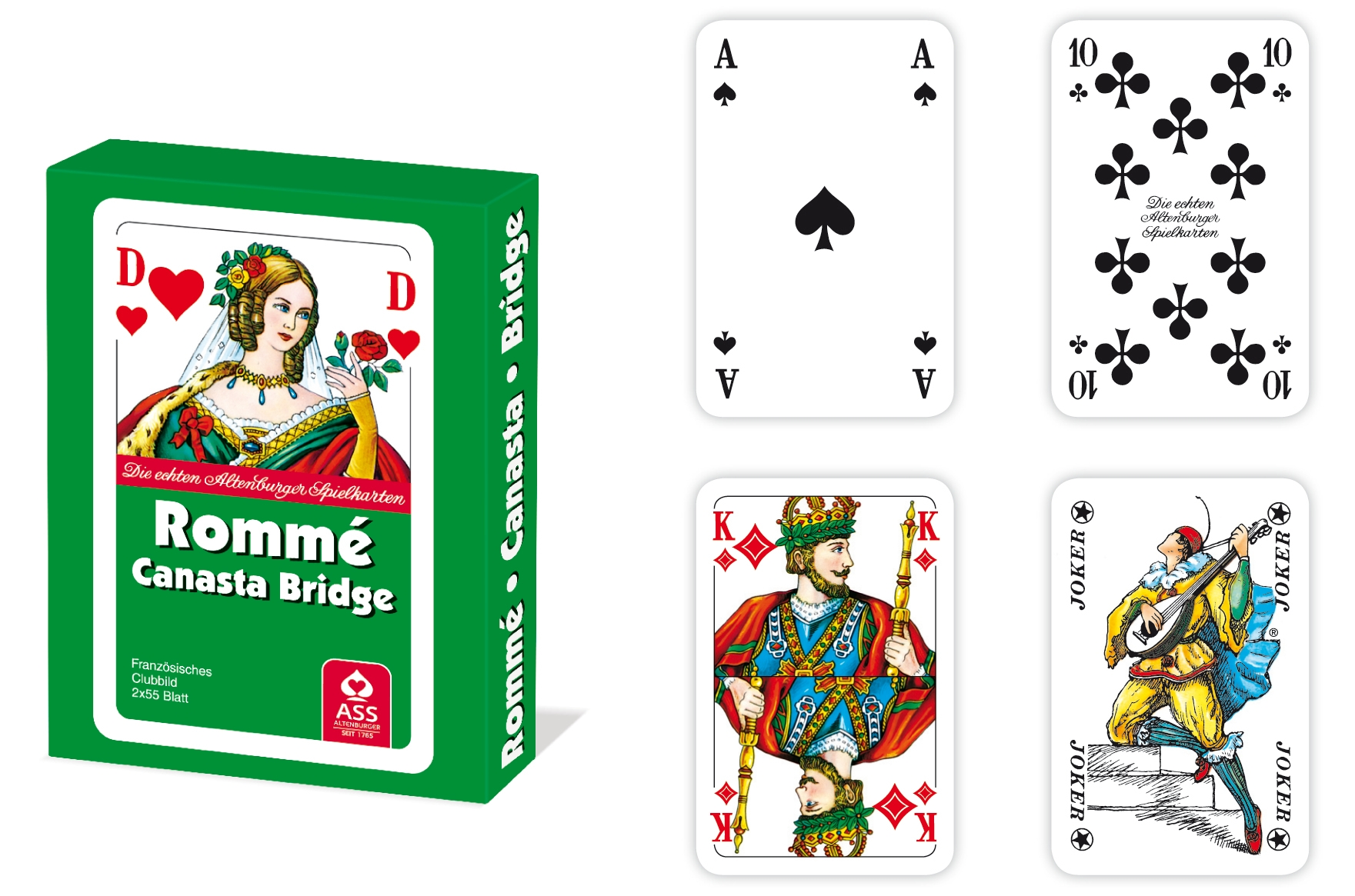
- A pack of 110 Rummy cards
- Origin: Germany
- Type: Matching
- Players: 2-6
- Age range: All
- Cards: 2 x 52 + 2 Jokers
- Deck: French
- Rank (high→low): A K Q J 10 9 8 7 6 5 4 3 2 (A)
- Play: Clockwise
- Playing time: 6-8 minutes/hand
- Chance: Medium

Related games
- Rommé • Gin Rummy

Viennese Rummy (German: Wiener Rummy) is a matching card game of the Rummy family for 2-6 people played in continental Europe.

== General ==
Unlike German Rummy, sets and runs of cards are not melded but collected in one's hand until one is able either to declare "Rummy" and lay the hand on the table or to "knock" (klopfen) and meld all cards except for low-scoring 'deadwood'. Hence it is sometimes called Rummy without Melding (Rommé ohne Auslegen), although that is strictly a variant of German Rummy where players receive 13, not 10, cards and may knock if they have fewer than 10, not 5, points. There is also no provision for players having one more go at improving their hand in the event of a knock.

== Cards ==
Viennese Rummy is played with two packs of French playing cards of 52 cards and one joker each, making a total of 106 cards. It is suitable for two to six players. Each player is dealt ten cards, except for the dealer who receives eleven.

== Rules ==
Like German Rummy, there are no standardised rules for Viennese Rummy. In fact a raft of almost identical games go under very different names including 101 Rummy and Elimination Rummy. Knock Rummy is a generic name for rummy games where players only reveal their hand at the end of the game. A related, two player, game is the popular Gin Rummy. The following rules are therefore not to be regarded as binding in the sense of chess rules. Unless otherwise stated, the rules of the game are the same as those for German Rummy.

=== Card values ===
The card values are as follows:

- Joker - 20 points
- Ace (Ass) - 11 points
- Court cards – K, Q, J – 10 points each
- Pip cards – 2 to 10 – score their value in pips

== Play ==
Each player is dealt ten cards and the remainder placed face down in the middle of the table as the stock. The dealer turns the top card of the stock face up and places beside it to start the discard pile. In turn and beginning with forehand (left of dealer), players now draw either the upcard or the top card of the stock, reviewing their hand before discarding a card face up to the discard pile.

The aim is to collect combinations of at least 3 cards, either as a set or as a run. However, unlike Rommé, players do not meld their cards to the table but keep them in their hands. A player who has ten cards in melds may go out by laying the melds on the table, placing the eleventh card face down across the discard pile and declaring "Rummy!" (Rommé!). A player may also go out by knocking on the table if his unmelded card or cards are worth fewer than 5 points after discarding. In this case, the others have one more chance to improve their hand by drawing and discarding before the game ends.

== Ending ==
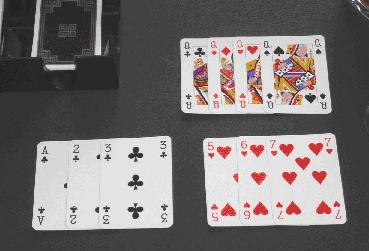
A Rummy (Rommé) declaration

A game continues until one player calls "Rummy" (Rommé), melds ten cards and discards the eleventh. The other players then lay out their cards and count them up as in Gin Rummy, by summing their deadwood, i.e. those that cannot be placed into sets or runs.

The game can also be ended by "knocking" (klopfen): a player who has fewer than five card points in deadwood (cards left unmelded in the hand ) can knock, reveal the hand as in a rummy call and announce the deadwood score. In this case, if a player has knocked, the others can try to improve their hand by drawing and discarding a card. They may not lay cards off on other players' melds. Then they declare their deadwood scores as normal.

== Rubber ==
Viennese Rummy is usually played in 'rubbers'. One rubber consists of several individual games. Before a game begins, each player contributes five chips to the pot (Pot or Pulle). After each game, the knocker or rummy caller wins the so-called knock money, i.e. a chip from all other participants still in play. Furthermore, for each player the negative points (Schlechtpunkte) received in this game are noted and added cumulatively.

Once a player has accumulated 101 or more points, they are eliminated; if all but one player is eliminated, the remaining player wins the pot and the game is over.

Players who have already accumulated over 81 but not yet 101 negative points, may 'buy themselves back' into the pot by contributing an additional five chips and reducing their bad point scores to that of the second worst player still in play. However, a player may only buy back once during the game.

== See also ==
- de:Rommé

== Literature ==
- Fritz Babsch: Internationale und österreichische Kartenspiel-Regeln, Piatnik, Vienna, 1983
- Johannes Bamberger: Die beliebtesten Kartenspiele, Verlag Perlen-Reihe, Vol. 648, 21st edition, Vienna 19??
- Claus D. Grupp: Rommé und Canasta in allen Variationen, Falken-Verlag Niedernhausen/Ts, 1982
- Rudolf Heinrich [d. i. Rudolf Bretschneider]: Rommé - Rummy international Alle Spielarten, Verlag Perlen-Reihe, Vol. 650, 7th edition, Vienna, 19??
- John Smith-Creighton: Das Rummyspiel, 3rd edition, Vienna, 1927
