= German Rummy =

Card game

- Rommé
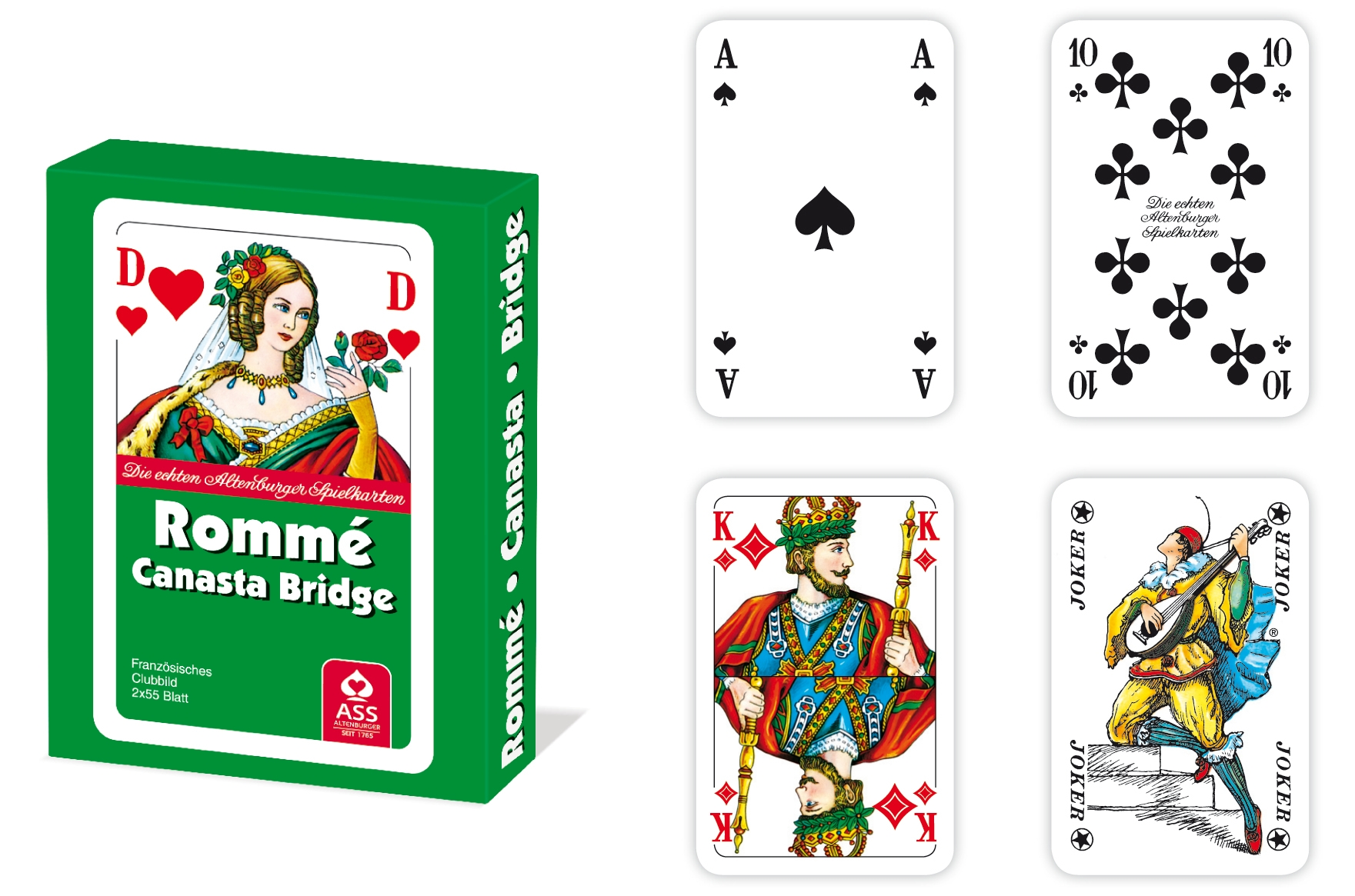
- A pack of 110 German Rummy cards
- Origin: Germany
- Type: Matching
- Players: 2–6
- Age range: All
- Cards: 2 x 52 + 6 Jokers
- Deck: French
- Rank (high→low): A K Q J 10 9 8 7 6 5 4 3 2 (A)
- Play: Clockwise
- Playing time: 6-15 minutes/hand
- Chance: Medium

Related games
- Rummy • Viennese Rummy

German Rummy or Rommé (German: Deutsches Rommé or Rommé mit Auslegen) is the most popular form of the worldwide game, Rummy, played in Austria and Germany. It is a game for two to six players and is played with two packs of French playing cards, each comprising 52 regular cards and three jokers. There are no partnerships. In Germany, the Germany Rummy Association (Deutscher Romméverband) is the umbrella organisation for local rummy clubs and organises national competitions. The game is often just known as Rommé in Germany and Rummy in Austria.

== History ==
The American game of Rummy was derived from Mexican Conquian after 1900 and the name "Rhum" or "Rhummy" had appeared by 1905. As Rommee, the game arrived in Germany from Austria and its rules were first recorded in 1933.

== Rules ==
The following rules largely follow Danyliuk and Grupp.

=== Aim ===
The aim of Rommé is to organise one's hand into sets or runs and to meld them by placing them on the table. The player who is first to meld all his or her cards, wins the game.

=== Preparation ===
Before the first hand begins, the cards are shuffled and laid face down in an arc. Each player draws one card; the player with the highest card selects a seat and is the first dealer. The other players sit to the left of the dealer in the order of the rank of the cards drawn.

=== Dealing ===
The deal changes clockwise after each hand. The dealer reshuffles the cards and has the pack cut by the player to the right. The cards are dealt face down clockwise, each player is dealt thirteen cards in 3 packets of three and 1 packet of four. The remaining cards are placed face down in the middle of the table as a Stoß (i.e. a talon or stock, pronounced "shtowss") and the top card is turned and placed beside the stock to form the waste pile.

Variations: In many cases, the rule is that a player who finds a joker when cutting may keep it. This is known as robbing or plundering (rauben), not to be confused with the rule allowing a joker to be exchanged (see below). In some rules, the top card is not turned but the dealer (or forehand) receives a fourteenth card and is first to play. In this case that player does not draw a card, but simply makes an initial meld if able and discards a card to start the waste pile.

=== Melds ===
Melds (Figuren) are combinations of at least three cards as follows:

- Sets (Sätze) of 3 or 4 equal-ranking cards of different suits, such as ♥K–♦K–♣K or ♠3–♥3–♦3–♣3,
- Runs (Folgen, Reihen, Sequenzen) of 3 or more cards in suit and in sequence - Aces may be high or low; for example ♥A–♥2–♥3, ♦8–♦9–♦10–♦B or ♣D–♣K–♣A, but not ♠K–♠A–♠2.

Melds may be built with the aid of Jokers. Jokers are wild cards which may be used to represent any other card; for example ♣B–♣D–Jkr–♣A or ♠6–♥6–Jkr.

A meld may not be built with just one natural card and two Jokers; in a run of at least four cards, however, two Jokers may follow one another so, for example ♠3–Jkr–Jkr–♠6 is an allowed combination.

=== Card values ===
The card values are as follows:

- Court cards – King, Queen and Jack – 10 points each
- Pip cards – 2 to 10 – score their value in pips
- Ace (Ass)
  - 11 points in a set or run after the King
  - 11 points at the end of the game
  - 1 point when used first in a run A–2–3.
- Joker
  - during the game - as many points as the card it represents
  - 30 points at the end of the game

=== Playing ===
The dealer goes first and begins by laying out any melds, provided the requirement for the first meld is met, and ends by placing a card face-up next to the pile ("discards"). Then the turn passes to the left.

Each following player begins by picking up either:

- the card turned up by the previous player
- the topmost face-down card of the stock (Stoß)

After that, a player may meld cards and finish the turn by placing a card face up on the discard pile.

Sometimes the game is played in such a way that a player may only pick up the top card of the discard pile if it is immediately played in a meld, either by using the card for an initial meld - in this case it counts towards the required 40 points (see below) - or by using it in another meld.

==== First meld ====
For the first meld by each player, the cards being melded must have a value of at least 40 points (but see variants). Players may not lay off cards onto existing melds when making their first melds.

==== Subsequent melds ====
A player who has placed an initial meld may, in turn, play additional melds at any time; their point value is only relevant for the first meld, not subsequent ones.

==== Lay-offs ====
A player who has made an initial meld may at any time, when it is that player's turn, lay off individual cards to melds already made, regardless of whether the meld was made by the player or an opponent.

Example: On the table is ♥2–♥3–♥4. A player who holds ♥A and ♥5 in hand may lay off two cards to the melded sequence.

Once melded, cards may no longer be returned to the hand or discarded.

==== Swapping a Joker ====
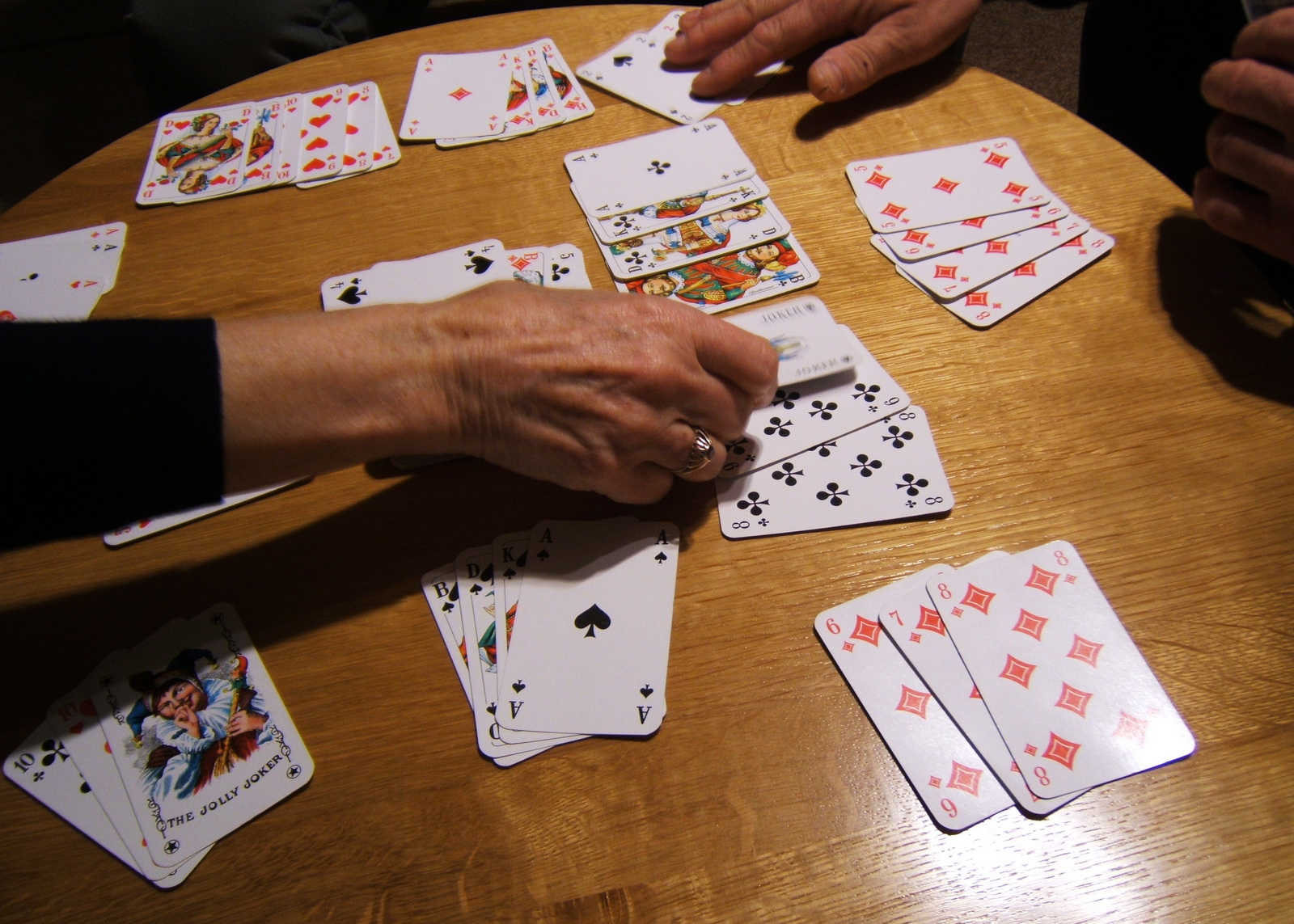
When exchanging a Joker

If there is a figure with a Joker on the table, for example ♠6–♥6–Jkr, and a player who holds the card that is represented by the Joker, here the ♣6 or ♦6, they can swap the Joker for this card. The Joker must be immediately used in a new meld and not just added to the player's hand. A Joker may only be swapped out after the first meld has been made.

The rules of the German Skat Association are stricter on this point: according to their rules, a Joker may only be replaced in a set if the set is completed with four cards of the same rank.

==== Ending ====
The player who is first to get rid of all cards by melding and/or laying off and, if need be, placing a last card face down (verdeckt) on the discard pile, while announcing "Rommé" - to signify the end of the game - wins the game. All the remaining players receive as many minus points as they have card points in their respective hands.

== Differences from Basic Rummy ==
The main differences compared with Basic Rummy (according to Parlett) are that German Rummy:

- Uses 2 packs and 6 Jokers, as opposed to one pack and 2 Jokers
- Players are dealt an initial hand of 13 cards as opposed to 7 or 10
- Players must score at least 40 points on the first meld

== Differences from Scala Quaranta ==
The main differences compared with the Italian variant, Scala Quaranta, are that, in German Rummy:

- There are 3 Jokers per pack instead of 2.
- Jokers score 30 at the end, not 25.
- The cards are dealt in packets, not singly.
- The rule that a card from the discard pile must be melded immediately is optional.
- A card need not be discarded to end the play.
- Players need not retire on reaching 101.

== See also ==
- de:Rommé

== Literature ==
- _ (1988) Erweitertes Spielregelbüchlein aus Altenburg, 8th edition, Verlag Altenburger Spielkartenfabrik, Leipzig, pp. 168–172.
- Babsch, Fritz (1983). Internationale und österreichische Kartenspiel-Regeln, Piatnik, Vienna.
- Bamberger, Johannes (2011). Die beliebtesten Kartenspiele, Perlen-Reihe Vol. 648, 25th edition, Verlag Perlen-Reihe, Vienna, pp. 127–133. ISBN 978-3-99006-002-5
- Danyliuk, Rita (2017). 1 x 1 der Kartenspiele, 19th edn. Hanover: Humboldt ISBN 978-3-86910-367-9
- Grupp, Claus D. (1975–1979). Kartenspiele Niederhausen: Falken ISBN 3-8068-2001-5
- Grupp, Claus D. (1982). Rommé und Canasta in allen Variationen, Falken-Verlag Niedernhausen/Ts.
- Heinrich, Rudolf [Rudolf Bretschneider]: Rommé - Rummy international Alle Spielarten, Verlag Perlen-Reihe, Vol. 650, 7th edition, Vienna, 19??
- Kopp, Dr. Bernhard (1987). Die schönsten Kartenspiele, Buch und Zeit Verlag, Wiesbaden, pp. 46–48. ISBN 3-8166-9570-1
- Lembke, Robert E. (1974?). Das große Haus- und Familienbuch der Spiele. Lingen, Cologne, pp. 207–211.
- Meister, Friedrich (1933). Rommee und Doppelkopf. Leipzig: Hackmeister & Thal.
- Parlett, David (1990). The Oxford Guide to Card Games. Oxford: OUP ISBN 0-19-214165-1
- Parlett, David (2008). The Penguin Book of Card Games. London: Penguin ISBN 978-0-141-03787-5
- Smith-Creighton, John (1927). Das Rummyspiel, 3rd edition, Vienna.
