= Desmoche =

Rummy card game

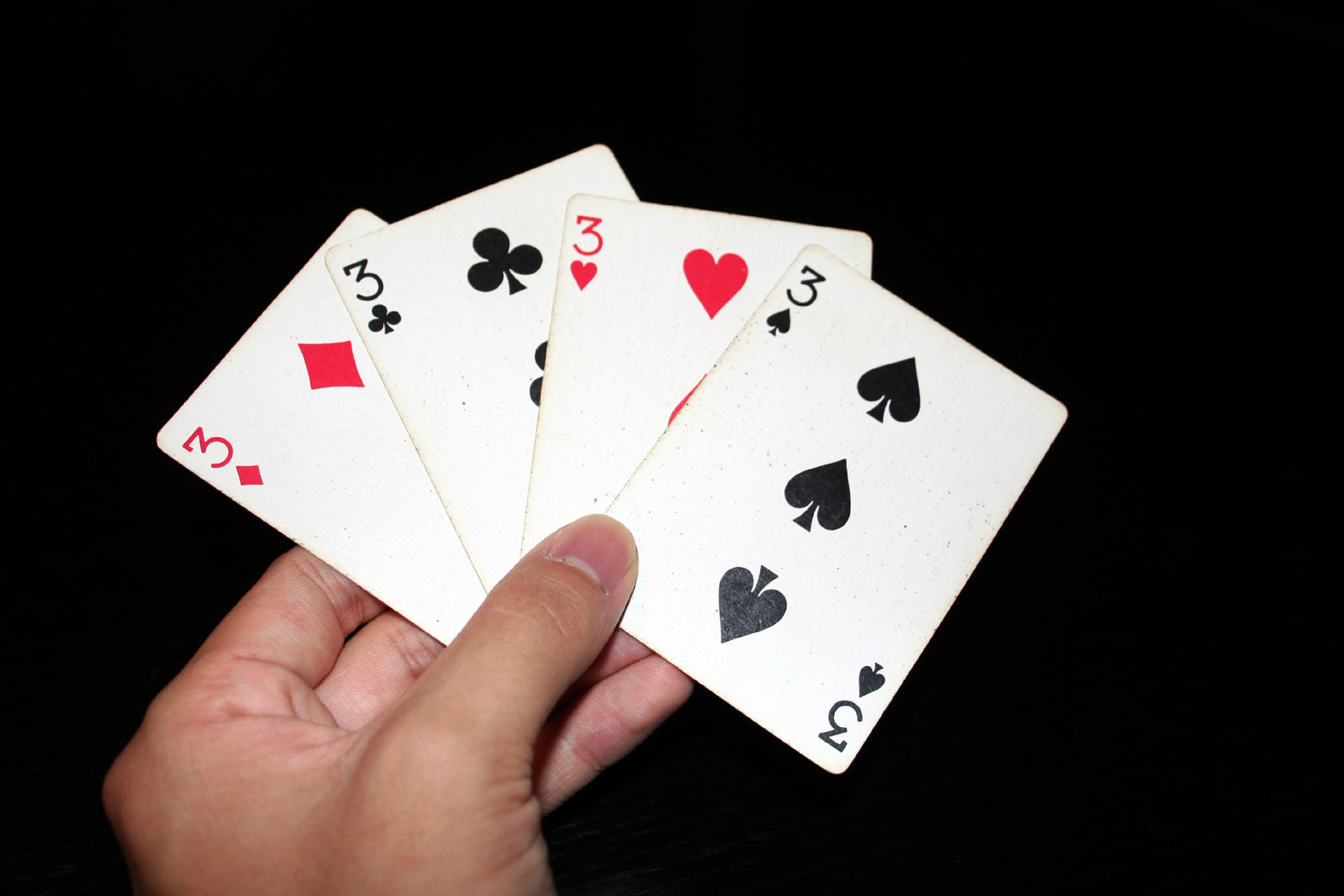
- Origin: Nicaragua
- Type: Matching
- Players: 2–4
- Skills: Attention, memory
- Cards: 52
- Deck: French-suited
- Rank (high→low): A K Q J 10 9 8 7 6 5 4 3 2
- Play: Counter-clockwise
- Playing time: 20 minutes
- Chance: Low to moderate

Related games
- Conquian

Desmoche (played in Nicaragua as conquién, with slight variations) is a popular rummy card game usually played for small stakes which closely resembles other games in the rummy family, like Conquian and gin rummy, more than poker. It was probably devised in Nicaragua in the first half of the 20th century.

== Rules ==
=== Object ===
The object of desmoche is to play, in either runs or sets, exactly ten cards on the table. The game is played by 2, 3 or 4 players with a standard deck of 52 playing cards.

=== Deal ===
Any player may start out as the dealer, which then rotates from round to round in a counterclockwise fashion. The player on the dealer's right may cut the deck before the dealer deals the cards face-down starting with the player on the right and continuing until each player receives nine cards. Cards that are not dealt remain in the deck, which is placed in the middle of the table and used throughout the remainder of the game.

=== Play ===
After players are dealt nine cards each, but before play begins, each player chooses one card from their hand and passes it face down to the player on their right. The "Cambio" (also known as "exchange", "pass" or "trade") can be a crucial factor in deciding one's hand.

If any of the "automatic win" specifications (available below) have been met either before or after the Cambio, the player with the winning hand must declare they have won and place their cards face up on the table for the other players to confirm the automatic win.

Otherwise, normal play begins.

The player to the right of the dealer begins play by drawing a card from the deck, being careful not to place that card into the cards already in their hand. If the player can make use of the card to create a meld, they do so by placing the card on the table in front of them and adding the cards from their hand to finalize the meld, all cards in the meld must be face up. If the card cannot be immediately used, it is placed face up in the discard pile. If any other player can use that card to create a meld, they can then play it face up on the table in front of them. If more than one player can use the card, the first player in counter-clockwise order from the player who discarded it gets to take it.

If no one can use the first card drawn, a second card is then drawn by the same player to the right of the dealer. Each player only draws one card before the next person's turn for the remainder of the game.

Each player is to always maintains nine cards in their possession. This includes both the cards in the player's hand and the cards which have been played face up on the table. If a player uses a card from either the deck or the discard pile, in order to maintain a count of nine cards the player must "pay" for this card by discarding a card from their own hand. Once a player discards a card that no one can use, play continues to that player's right, regardless of whether any other player's turns seemed to have been skipped.

The only time a player will have more than nine cards is when they have won, at which time they will have exactly ten cards.

If no player has played ten cards face up on the table by the time the final card has been discarded from the deck, there is no winner and, if playing for money, the bet for the next game is added to the current pot.

Whether there is a winner or not, the player to the right of the previous dealer is now the dealer, and play continues.

Much like Poker, game play ends when a player is out of money or simply no longer wishes to continue playing.

==== Melds ====
Melds in desmoche must contain a minimum of three cards. They can be runs of the same suit (i.e. 8♠ 9♠ 10♠) containing three to ten cards, or sets of three or four cards of identical rank (i.e. 8♠ 8♥ 8♣). After a player has played a meld on the table, it can be added to by cards in that player's hand or by any cards that are discarded by a player that will continue the meld.

The highest run allowed is J Q K, a meld of Q K A is not allowed. A 2 3 is the smallest run allowed, but is often considered the highest valued run (see Bonuses below).

Sometimes players enforce strict rules for laying down melds, in which a player is disqualified if their cards are not arranged in the correct order. Runs must be placed in ascending order, like 8♠ 9♠ 10♠ and not 8♠ 10♠ 9♠. Sets must be played with suit color alternating, i.e. 8♠ 8♥ 8♣ not 8♠ 8♣ 8♥.

A player performs a desmoche, which the game is named for, by taking a card from any of their face up melds to use in another meld, but only as long as all melds that remain on the table are still valid melds (i.e: 8♠ 8♥ 8♣ 8♦ can be used to desmoche an 8♦ to create a new meld of 8♦ 9♦ 10♦ because 8♠ 8♥ 8♣ is still a valid meld).

=== Winning ===
All automatic wins MUST be declared before the first card is drawn for game play, otherwise the win is forfeited and the game continues as normal. All automatic wins are valid if the terms are met either before or after the "Cambio". Ace is always considered the highest card for deciding upon multiple automatic wins.

- "Peladilla": A player's hand contains no matching sets of 2 cards or higher, and no matching runs of 2 cards or higher of the same suit, i.e. A♠ 3♣ 4♦ 7♥ 8♠ 10♦ J♠ Q♥ K♦. If 2 or more players have Peladilla, the player with the highest ranking card in their hand wins (i.e: A♠ 3♣ 4♦ 7♥ 8♠ 10♦ J♠ Q♥ K♦ beats 2♥ 3♦ 4♥ 7♠ 8♦ 10♠ J♣ Q♦ K♥ because A♠ is the highest card of the two hands.)
- "Cuatro Cuerpos": A player's hand contains four cards of identical ranks (i.e: 8♠ 8♥ 8♣ 8♦). If 2 or more players have Cuatro Cuerpos at the same time, the player with the highest ranking set of four identical rank cards wins.
- "Color": A player's hand contains only cards of the same color. (This rule is not always agreed upon, check with the players before game play if they accept Color as an instant win, sometimes Color is only accepted if all cards are the same color and same suit.)

If the players are "playing everything" as stated in the bonuses section below, all losing players must pay a bonus to the winner because they are all "Arriba del Palo".

In the Honduran variation Conquién there is not automatic wins.

==== Variations ====
When a card is discarded and more than one person can make use of the card, the person closest in the counter-clockwise rotation to the player who discarded the card gets first priority. This means that, if the person on the far left of the circle wants to use the card, and, the person in the first order of the rotation wants to use it as well, the player in the first rotation gets to have that card. Often players signify in order when a card does not "serve" them by knocking on the table.

If a card placed on the discard pile can be added to any meld currently on the table it can be forced onto the meld and the player will have to "pay" for the card by discarding from their hand. If the player discarding the card is the same person with the meld, the card can be forced back to them, but if another player wants the card, they can take it (this is sometimes debated). If the card can be added to another player's meld, and the card is not taken by a player who is earlier in the rotation, then the card is automatically added to the meld and the player is forced to "pay" for that card. For example, if a player has A♥ 2♥ 3♥ on the table and the card being discarded is 4♥, the card is automatically placed on that sequence if no player earlier in the rotation claims it, and the player has to pay for that card. However, this rule is not always followed.

=== Betting ===
The betting in desmoche takes place before the cards have been dealt. Every player bets the same amount for each hand, which is determined before playing. The bet can only change before cards are dealt, if all players agree upon the new bet. The bet does not get raised during the play of a hand. If a game ends without a winner, each player adds the same bet as the previous game to the pot for the next game. (This is called "Doble", "Triple", "Quadruple", etc.)

=== Passing ===
When a player realizes they cannot win and can confirm there are no cards left in the deck that can be placed on their melds already face up on the table, they are allowed to pass their turn for the remainder of the hand, at which time they can place their melds face down to prevent the other players from seeing them. (i.e: If a player's face up cards include: 10♠ 10♥ 10♣ 10♦ and J♥ Q♥ K♥, no more cards can be added to their melds because they already have their own 10♥.)

=== Bonuses ===
If the players decide "to play everything" or "jugar todo" there are possible bonuses involved with winning, the bonus is equal to the amount of the bet at the start of the hand.

- "Mico": If the winner has a run of A 2 3, each losing player must pay a bonus. (Multiple bonuses of this type are allowed.)
- "Arriba del Palo": If a player has not played any of their cards face up on the table before another player wins, they are considered "up the tree" and they must pay a bonus to the winner.
- "Color": If a player wins with all cards of the same suit (i.e: A♥ 2♥ 3♥ 4♥ 5♥ 6♥ 7♥ 8♥ 9♥ 10♥ or 2♥ 3♥ 4♥ / 6♥ 7♥ 8♥ / 10♥ J♥ Q♥ K♥), each losing player pays a bonus.

These bonuses are allowed to be stacked. For example, if a player wins with A♠ 2♠ 3♠ 4♠ 5♠ 6♠ 7♠ 8♠ 9♠ 10♠ they are due a bonus for "Color" and for "Mico" from each player, and if any players are "Arriba del Palo" they must pay the winner for that as well.

In the Conquién game there is not bonuses.

=== Side games ===
Players can also bet on side games with separate pots of money. These games must be started before the cards are dealt. Players of the main game are not required to join the side games.

The following is a list of the side game names followed by their requirement to win.

- "oro" (or "rombo"): Highest diamond(♦) card.
- "corazon": Highest heart(♥) card.
- "flor": Highest club(♣) card.
- "corazon negro": Highest spade(♠) card.
- "par rojo": Highest red pair.
- "par negro": Highest black pair.
- "dos par rojo": Highest set of two red pairs.
- "dos par negro": Highest set of two black pairs.
- "tres cuerpos": Highest three-of-a-kind (i.e: A♠ A♥ A♣).
- "escalera": Highest run of three or more cards of the same suit (i.e: A♦ 2♦ 3♦).

To win a side game, the winning card(s) must be received on the deal and not on the "Cambio". If a player has a possible winner in their hand, they must announce that they have it before the "Cambio" and they must show it when the cards are played or discarded, or at the end of the game if it is still in their hand after someone else has won. For these side games, Ace is considered the highest card, and 2 is considered the lowest card. For "escalera" A 2 3 is often considered a higher run than J Q K, but this is sometimes debated.

In Honduras the only side game that is used to be played, is "oro".

=== Disqualification ===
If a player is disqualified, their cards are removed from game play and they must wait until the next hand to continue playing.

Reasons for disqualification include:

- The dealer has dealt an incorrect number of cards to any player. (Any extra cards dealt must be returned to the deck, the dealer's cards are put aside and are not played.)
- Any player is caught physically moving cards in the discard pile to check for cards that have already passed.
- A player places a card into the cards in their hand, either from the deck or the discard pile.
- A player plays melds on the table in an incorrect order (as described in the melds section above).

Enforcement of these rules depends on the players. It is not uncommon for these offenses to be immediately forgiven, with play continuing as normal without any disqualification.

== See also ==
- Rummy
- Continental
