= Panguingue =

Card game

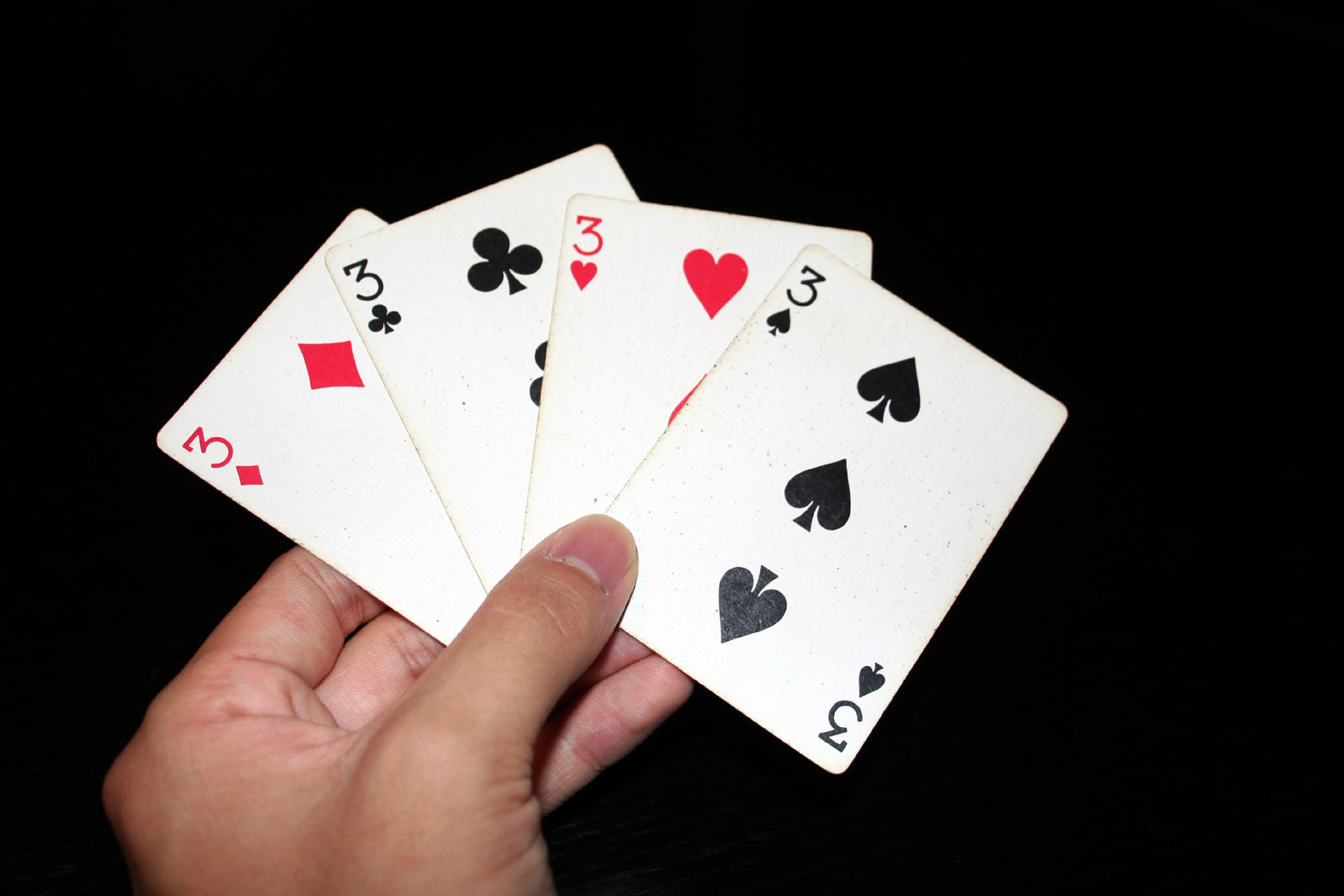
- Alternative names: Pan
- Type: Rummy
- Players: 2-8
- Cards: 440
- Deck: Anglo-American; Spanish-Cadiz Pattern
- Rank (high→low): K Q J 7 6 5 4 3 2 A
- Play: Counter-Clockwise

Related games
- Rummy, Mahjong

In card games, panguingue (pronounced "pan-geen-ee", in Tagalog pangginggí, and also known as pan) is a 19th-century gambling card game probably of Philippine origin similar to rummy, first described in America in 1905. It used to be particularly popular in Las Vegas and other casinos in the American southwest. Its popularity has been waning, and it is now only found in a handful of casinos in California, in house games and at online poker sites. In California, it, and the low-ball version of poker, were the only games for which it was legal to play for money.

== The deck ==
The game is traditionally played using a 320-card deck, constructed from eight decks of playing cards, removing all eights, nines, tens, and Jokers, which makes it like the 40-card Spanish deck. In some localities, 5, 6, or 11 decks are used, and often one set of spades is removed. Meanwhile in the Philippines, instead of the Anglo-American deck, they traditionally use the original 40-card Spanish Deck for the game with Ace, 2-7, Jack, Cavalier (instead of Queen), King.

== The game ==
Each player pays an ante of one chip, called the top. The value of the top sets the value of all pays in the game. Some high-stakes games are played with a two-chip ante, which is called double tops. The rotation of dealing and playing is to the right, not to the left as in most card games. Each player receives 10 cards. Beginning with the eldest hand, each player either folds their hand (going out on top) or agrees to play. The player who folds loses their top. If all but one fold, the final player receives the tops, and the hand is over. Some games by agreement do not use an ante. Players merely pay points called "beans" to players as they play melds onto the board. If the player does not request their beans prior to discarding, the other players are not obligated to pay them.

Players try to form melds. A meld consists of three or four cards of the same rank (e.g., three 6s), or in sequence (3, 4, 5) (sequences are called ropes or stringers). All the cards in a rope must be the same suit, but rank melds require either three cards of the same suit or three different suits. The exception for rank melds is Aces and Kings (non-comoquers) any three of which can form a meld (e.g. two Aces of Hearts and an Ace of Diamonds).

Certain melds are called conditions, and when formed result in the payment of chips to the melder from all active players (those who did not go out on top).

When playing with two players an alternate method of keeping score is to use the "set over" method. Rather than paying beans to each other, each player starts with a stack of beans to their left then they pay beans to themselves as they play melds. These beans are kept with the melds until the end of the hand when they are transferred to the right. The first player to move their stack from left to right is the winner.

Two of three cards in a rank spade valle card meld are called a wagon. Being unable to play a wagon with a matching spade during the course of a hand is called being "peckered"

Being dealt a playable meld is called being dealt a one, two or four bean "patsy" depending on value.

=== Conditions ===
In Panguingue, 3's, 5's and 7's are also known as 'valle' cards, or cards of value. The following melds are conditions (have value):

- Ropes ending in an Ace or a King (only) (value is 1 in every suit but spades, 2 in spades)
- Valle rank melds of 3 different suits (1)
- Valle rank melds of 3 of the same suit (2 in every suit but spades, 4 in spades) also called a "bong"
- Rank melds of 3 non-valle cards of the same suit. (1 in every suit but spades, 2 in spades).

Extra cards in a same-suit meld are worth additional points.

=== Playing ===
Play consists of taking a card from the top of the stock, or the top of the discard pile. Once a player touches the stack, they are not allowed to then use the discard pile instead. The card must be used in a valid meld (which must be placed on the table) or immediately discarded (unlike other rummy-style games, you cannot add the card to your hand and discard another). If a card is discarded that fits an open meld, that card must be used (Forcing). Discards which play on the next players melds may be forced onto the next player if they were picked from the stack rather than being discarded from a players hand.

Note that one cannot put down a meld or condition (and/or collect chip payments) unless they can use the top of the stock or the top of the discards.

When one player melds 11 cards—their original ten plus one more (going out) that player receives the tops, plus additional payment from the active players for all that player's valid conditions, plus two points for going out.

There are some who play fifteen-card pan, made popular in Minnesota, and more commonly referred to as "Fifteen" or "Pip". It works the same as the traditional game, except players receive fifteen cards to begin with and going out requires sixteen cards.

A player can not quit a hand until someone goes out. If a player fouls their hand, they stay in and continue to pay, but have no more chance to make paying combinations themself.

== In popular culture ==
The game sometimes features in tales set in the American Southwest. One character gives his take on it in Roger Torrey’s 1938 hardboiled detective story “42 Days for Murder”, set in Reno, NV:

I said: “Those two guys I've known for ten years. They're card dealers. I used to know them when I worked in Eureka. They had a pan game there.”
“Pan game?” Lester asked.
“Panguingi. It's like rummy, only more so. Like a cross between rummy and coon-can. It's insanity and slow death. You can't quit playing it once you start and the house gets all the money because they're cutting the game so hard.”
Lester lied and said: “I see!” and Kewpie laughed and said: “I've played it. I never had a dime all the time I did.”

== See also ==
- Rummy
- Gin rummy
