= Cinchona (disambiguation) =

Cinchona can refer to

- Cinchona, a genus in the Rubiaceae plant family
  - Jesuit's bark, also called cinchona: bark from any of several Cinchona species used to extract quinine used in medicine
- Cinchona, Costa Rica, epicenter of the 2009 Cinchona earthquake
- USS Cinchona (AN-12), a World War II-era ship

== See also ==
- Chinchón (disambiguation)
