= Rumino =

Knock rummy card game

- A 7 card straight flush or "rumino" wins the game instantly
- Origin: Italian
- Family: Matching
- Players: 2–6
- Skills: Strategy
- Cards: 52
- Deck: Anglo-American
- Play: Clockwise
- Playing time: 20 min.
- Chance: Medium

Related games
- Gin rummy

Rumino (also ramino or rumina) is a knock rummy card game of Italian origin for up to six people, in which players try to form sets or sequences of cards. It may possibly have been devised in America during the 1940s by Italian immigrants by adapting the game Scala Quaranta to Gin rummy. It is usually played for small stakes Two 52-card decks are used plus four Jokers comprising 108 cards.

== Object ==
The aim of the game is to push the players over 100 points and keep a score low. Each player draws a card from the pack, and the high card determines the first dealer. Subsequently, the deal rotates to the left.

Each player is dealt 7 cards, and the remaining stock is spread on the table. The top card of the stock is then turned face up to start the discard pile, and eldest hand (player left of the dealer) draws the top card from the stock or discard pile to make combinations of three or four-card melds, e.g. sets of three or four of a kind, or sequences of three or four cards. Aces can be played low (i.e. Ace-Deuce-Three) and Jokers are wild. After a card is drawn, one must be discarded, and the next player to the left has the option of drawing either the top discard or top stock card, before discarding.

=== Knocking ===
Unused cards in a player's hand are known as deadwood and are given point values, and a player can 'knock' when with 7 or less points. This must be done when it is that player's turn in lieu of drawing. This stops the current hand and players lay down their cards and add up their points. Melds count as 0 and unusable deadwood cards are "points". Face cards and Jokers count as 10, Aces are 1, and other cards are index value.

=== Hitting gin ===
If the player draws a meld of 4 and a lay of 3, meaning that they are using all 7 cards, they can announce "gin" (or "ten less"): the hand immediately stops and the player scores -10 points. Other players are stuck with whatever unusable points they have in their hand. If a player hits "gin" for the 1st three consecutive hands to begin a game, they automatically win.

=== Hitting Rumino ===
A player who draws a 7 card straight flush or 7 of a kind, announces "rumino". The game stops and that player wins the game outright. If 6 cards of the "rumino" are held and a second player discards the seventh card, the first player may pick it up even if it is out of turn.

=== Re-buying ===
A player who gets over 100 points is eliminated from the game, but can buy back in for the highest score if desired, as long as there are at least two other players left. No buys are allowed if "rumino" is hit, or when the hand started as heads-up.

Every time a certain player buys, the stake for that player doubles. In a $10 game, for instance, the first time a player buys it costs them $10, the second time $20, and so on. When only one person is left with 100 points or less, or when someone hits "rumino", that person is the winner and sweeps the pool. If a new game is played, the winner deals the first hand.

== See also ==
- Continental (card game)
- Mille (card game)
- Carioca (card game)
