= Conquian =

Card game

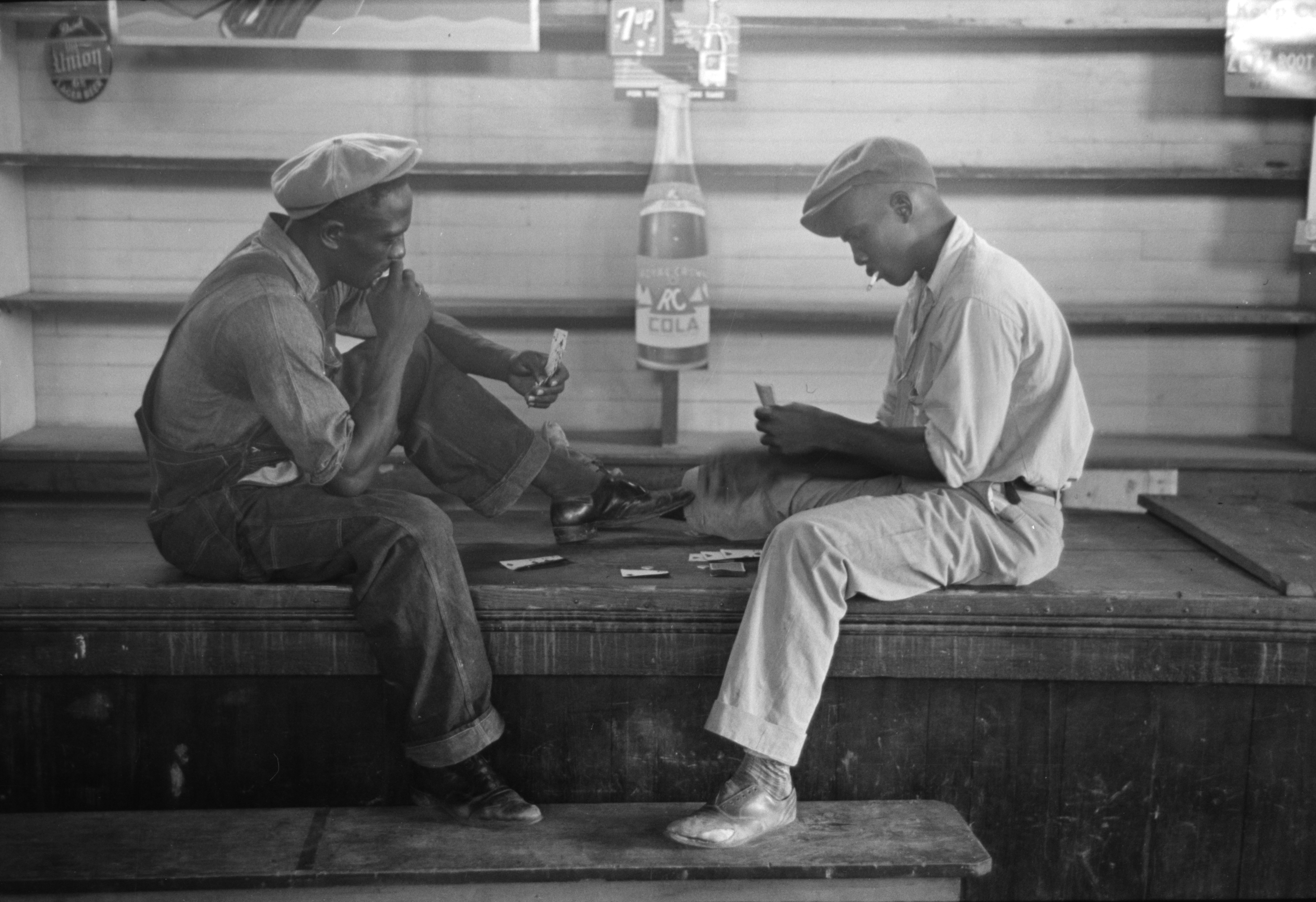
- "Game of coon-can in store near Reserve, Louisiana", 1938; photo by Russell Lee
- Origin: Mexico
- Alternative names: Coon can, Colonel
- Type: Matching
- Players: 2–6
- Skills: Strategy
- Cards: 40
- Deck: Spanish
- Play: Clockwise
- Playing time: 20 minutes
- Chance: Medium

Related games
- Panguingue • Desmoche

Conquian, Coon Can or Colonel (the two-handed version) is a rummy-style card game. David Parlett describes it as an ancestor to all modern rummy games, and a kind of proto-gin rummy. Before the appearance of gin rummy, it was described as "an excellent game for two players, quite different from any other in its principles and requiring very close attention and a good memory to play it well".

== History ==
The game originated in Mexico in the mid-1800s. Court records published in 1861 suggest that Conquian was well established there in the 1850s, and this is reinforced by an 1857 account of life in Mexico City. Later, it is recorded in the 1880s in Mexico being played alongside Tuti, Malilla de Campo, Mus and Rentoy. It continued to be popular into the early 20th century, Mexican politician and military leader, Gonzalo Santos, recalling that "before the Revolution [1910–1920] we had a good life. We lived out there in Tampamolón and did nothing other than play Conquián or domino in the bars..."

By 1852 it was still there, but New Mexico was now part of the United States, so that conquian was included in a list of examples of pastimes that were legally permitted as a "game of recreation".

Card game expert Robert F. Foster traced Conquian back to the early 1860s., though giving no evidence for such an early date. According to him, even in the US the game was originally played by two players with a Spanish pack of 40 cards from which the 8s, 9s and 10s were missing. He claims that, in 1873, he was the first to propose that the Kings, Queens and Jacks should be removed, leaving a natural sequence of 10 cards in each suit.

The earliest rules are supposed to appear in a lost book published around 1871, called Game of Rum (Coon Can), but no copy of this book has ever been found. The earliest so far description of the game appeared in 1887, under the name Coon Can, in The Standard Hoyle: The modern authority on games. A complete guide and reliable authority upon all games of chance or skill now played in the United States (New York : Excelsior, 1887), p. 480-481. It was later described in more detail in R.F. Foster Foster's Hoyle of 1897, where it was said to be "a great favorite in Mexico and in all the American states bordering upon it, especially Texas". By 1900, the game had spread to the eastern US and, around 1908, three- and four-player versions initially under the name of Rum emerged which used a full 52-card pack. By 1912, it had reached England, a variant with 2 packs and 2 Jokers and called Coon Can being popularised by the Bath Club in London.

The name is thought to derive from con quién – Spanish "with whom". It is sometimes corrupted to Coon Can, (Note: First described in The Standard Hoyle in 1887 and today known in the United States as Double Rum for being played with two packs) Cooncan, Conquain, Councan, Conca and Cuncá, a South American variation of the game. In 19th-century Mexican literature (Note: E.g. Luis Gonzaga Inclán's Astucia, 1865; Juan Antonio Mateos's Sacerdote y caudillo, 1869.) the word is spelled cunquián or conquián, but legal publications in New Mexico, in both Spanish and English, record it as conquian and Wood and Goddard state that the game was named after the Spanish "¿con quién?" - "with whom?" referring to the melding of cards. But this lacks support, since no Mexican author has ever mentioned such a hypothesis. On the contrary, they often write conquián in italics, as if it were a "foreign" word. It is more likely to have come from the Philippines, where a card game called kongkian, akin to panguingue, sounds like conquian and has similar rules…

== Overview ==
The aim is to be the first to get rid of the cards, including the last one drawn, by melding sets and runs. The total number of cards melded must be 11 at the end.

=== Cards ===
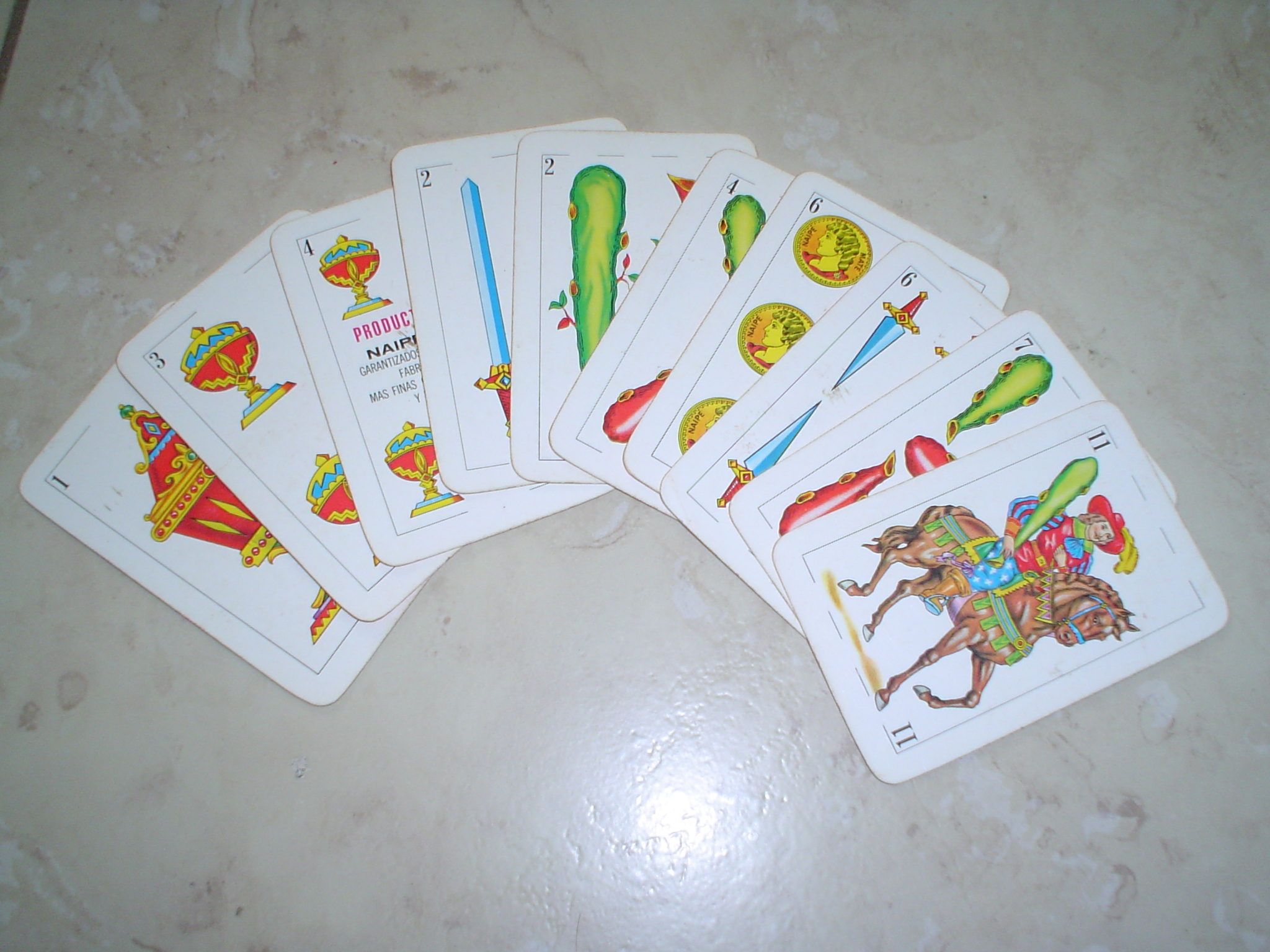
Hand of 10 Spanish-suited cards, Mexican pattern

Conquian is played by two or more players with Spanish playing cards or a 40-card pack of French playing cards either by removing the courts or by removing the 8s, 9s and 10s. The two-player game is sometimes called Colonel to distinguish it (see below).

Ranks and card-point values of cards (lowest to highest)
Spanish-suited cards (40-card pack)	1	2	3	4	5	6	7	10 (Sota)	11 (Caballo)	12 (Rey)
French-suited cards (no courts)	A	2	3	4	5	6	7	8	9	10
French-suited cards (no 8/9/10)	A	2	3	4	5	6	7	J	Q	K

=== Deal ===
Each player is dealt 10 cards in five packets of two and the remainder are placed face down as a stock. During play, cards may be melded by pairing at least three of a kind or by a straight flush sequence i.e. three to eight cards from the sequence 1 2 3 4 5 6 7 S C R. Thus, 1-2-3 and 6-7-S are valid, but C-R-1 is not.

=== Play ===
After the deal, the dealer turns up the top card from the remainder of the deck to begin the discard pile. The non-dealer then has the option to take the first card, but must use it immediately (with at least two hand-cards) to make a meld. If the non-dealer does not want the card, the dealer has the option to pick it up and use it for his meld. If neither player wants the first card, the non-dealer takes the first card from the draw pile and may use it immediately to meld or discard it. The pick up may not be added to the hand cards. If either player makes a valid meld with it, that player must discard one card from his hand. The other player may then choose this card or draw another from the pile.

So whoever turns from the pile has first choice of the card turned, and must either meld it, extend one of his existing melds with it, or pass. If both players pass, the second turns it down and draws next.

==== Melding ====
In melding, a player may "borrow" cards from their other melds to help create new ones, provided that those thereby depleted are not reduced to less than valid three-card melds. After melding, the player's discard becomes available to the opponent, who may then either meld it or turn it down and make the next draw.

==== Forcing ====
A player who declines a faced card that can legally be added to one of that player's existing melds, must meld it if the opponent so demands. This is called 'forcing'. By forcing, it is sometimes possible to create a situation from which one's opponent can never go out. It is therefore a feature of much interest to the strategy of the play. If neither is out when the last available card has been declined, the game is drawn and the stake carried forward.

=== Winning ===
Winning a hand entails melding 11 cards, so on the last play, the winning player must use the drawn card in his meld. Play may be extended over several hands by playing to a specified point total.

Points still in the losing player's hand may be awarded to the winner. If using a Spanish pack or pip cards from a French pack, a possible scoring system totals the face value of all cards. If using a shortened French pack minus the 8s, 9s and 10s, one scoring system gives face value for 2–7, 10 for jacks, queens and kings, and 15 for aces.

== Variations ==
- The jacks, queens and kings may be removed instead of 8s, 9s and 10s.
- No cards are removed.
- Each player may be dealt nine cards and attempt to meld 10.
- Three players can play this game with eight cards being dealt and attempt to meld nine.
- Four players can play with seven cards dealt and attempt to meld eight.
- Players may "borrow" from opponents melds, providing they leave at least three cards on that meld.
- Black cards with a value of 2 may be used to replace any other card in the deck
- Trading can happen after the players have reviewed their initial hands, but before the first draw. Each player takes one hand card and passes it clockwise to the next person at the table. Players agree among themselves how many trades are allowed in the game.

== Colonel ==
According to Routledge (1923, 2005), Colonel is Coon-Can for two players. A single, 40-card, Spanish-suited pack was traditionally used, but a French pack may be used either without the courts or without the 8, 9 and 10. Routledge assumes a full, 52-card French pack. Players cut for the first deal and lowest cuts (Aces low) before both are dealt 10 cards each, individually and face down. The rest are placed face down to form a stock and the top card (known as the 'optional card') is turned and placed beside it to start the wastepile. The aim is to be first to shed all one's cards by melding sets (3 or 4 of a kind) and runs (sequences) in the same suit. A run or set must contain at least three cards and Aces may be high or low, but round-the-corner sequences are not allowed. Players may 'lay off' one or more cards against their own or their opponent's existing melds. Non-dealer (or 'pone') starts by drawing either the turnup or the top card of the stock and may now meld or 'declare' as many sets or runs as possible (but does not have to), before placing a discard on the wastepile. Play continues in this way until one goes out and scores as many points as the opponent has in hand; courts counting ten and the rest counting their face value in pips. A player may 'challenge' at any stage. If a challenge is accepted, the deal ends and the player with the lowest counting hand wins, scoring the number of pips in his opponent's hand. The deal also ends if the stock runs out, whereby the player with the lowest hand wins and scores the opponent's pips less those in the player's own hand. Colonel may be the precursor of Gin Rummy.

Foster's recommended variant of Colonel, which he calls Cooncan for two players, has some differences: first, a player must get 11 cards down, not meld 10 and discard one at the end. Second, the player can only lay off a discard to the opponent's melds. Third, cards drawn from stock must be shown and either melded or discarded again. Fourth, cards may be borrowed from one meld and used to another provided both have been melded by the same player. The winner is the first to meld 11 cards on their side of the table. If neither can do this, it is a tableau or draw and the next deal decides.

== See also ==
- Rummy

== Literature ==
- _ (1871). The Game of Rum (Coon Can): Full Directions for Playing this Popular Game.
- _ (c. 1913). The Game of Rum and How to Play it. New York: Fitzgerald.
- Cambas, Manuel Rivera (1883). Mexico Pintoresco, Artistico y Monumental. Vol. 3. Mexico: Reforma.
- Dalton, W. (1912). "Coon-Can" in The Saturday Review, 26 October 1912. pp. 520–521.
- Elwell, Joseph Bowne (1912). "The Game of Coon Can" in The Principles, Rules and Laws of Auction Bridge. New and enlarged edn. NY: Charles Scribner's Sons. pp. 185–194.
- Foster, R. F. (1897). "Conquian" in Foster's Complete Hoyle. Frederick A. Stokes, New York, pp. 486–489.
- Foster, R. F. (1913a). Cooncan (Conquián): A Game of Cards also Called "Rum". NY: F.A. Stokes.
- Foster, R. F., Walter H. Barney & David A. Curtis (1913b). Official Rules of Card Games: Hoyle Up-to-date. 17th edn. Cincinnati: USPCC. Full-text reproduction of the rules in electronic form, public domain. See also 2007 Edition, ISBN 0-548-31771-2.
- Lomnitz-Adler, Claudio (2023). Exits from the Labyrinth: Culture and Ideology in the Mexican National Space. Berkeley, Los Angeles, Oxford: UCP. ISBN 0-520-07788-1
- Méndez, Luis (1861). Gaceta de los Triubnales de la República Mexicana, Volume 2. Mexico: Isidoro Devaux.
- Parlett, David (2008). The Penguin Book of Card Games, Penguin, London. ISBN 978-0-141-03787-5
- Prieto, Guillermo (1857). Viajes de Orden Suprema. Mexico: Vicente Garcia Torres.
- Routledge George. (1923). "Colonel (Coon-Can for Two Players)" in Hoyles Card Games rev. by Lawrence H. Dawson (1950), Part 1 publ. 1979. Reprinted 1980, 1982, 2001, 2005, Routledge, Abingdon. pp. 100-101
- Smead, Robert N. (2004). Vocabulario Vaquero/Cowboy Talk: A Dictionary of Spanish Terms from the American West. Oklahoma: University of Oklahoma.
