= Contract rummy =

Card game

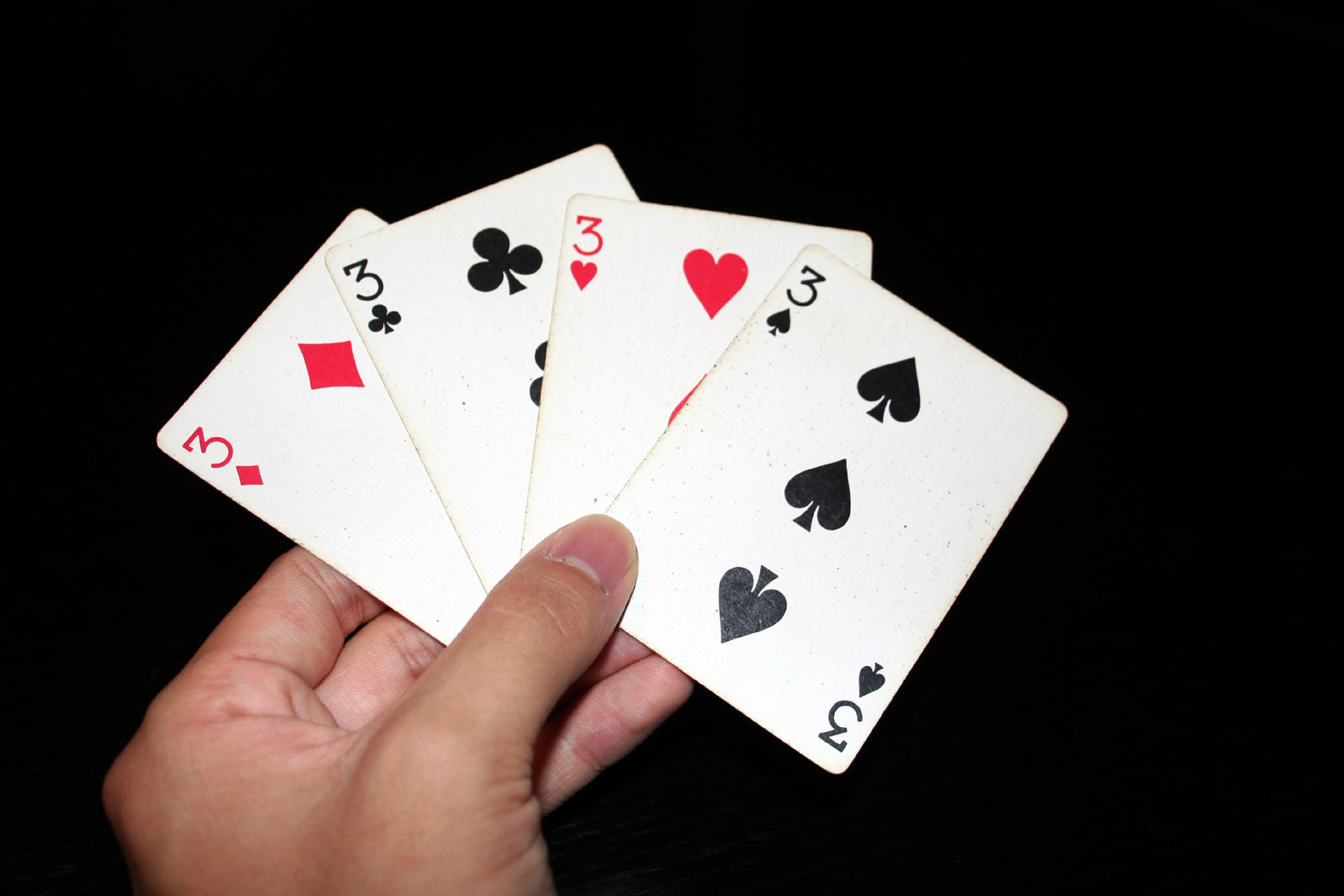
- A meld of four cards in contract rummy
- Origin: America
- Alternative names: Combination rummy
- Family: Matching
- Players: 3-8
- Skills: Strategy
- Cards: 54+ multiple decks depending on players
- Deck: French
- Rank (high→low): A K Q J 10 9 8 7 6 5 4 3 2 (A)
- Play: Clockwise
- Playing time: 2 hours
- Chance: Medium

Related games
- Gin Rummy

Contract rummy is a Rummy card game, based on gin rummy played by 3 to 8 players. It appeared in the United States during the Second World War. The game is also known as Combination rummy, Deuces Wild Rummy and Joker rummy, and a proprietary version of the game called Phase 10 was published in 1982.

== Play ==
=== Basics ===
Contract rummy is played with multiple decks of 54 standard playing cards, including the Jokers. Aces are high and low (above a King), and Jokers are wild cards. The number of decks varies from 2 to 4 and is based on the number of players (see chart). Each game is based on 7 rounds of hands, and the rules for each hand are unique. One player begins as dealer for the first hand, and then the player to the dealer's left becomes dealer for the next hand, and so on. Each player is dealt ten cards for the first four rounds and then 12 for the last three. The rest of the deck is then placed face down in the middle of the players; this is referred to as the stock. One card is taken from the top of the stock and placed face up next to it. This card is called the upcard and becomes the beginning of the discard pile, else known as "dead", or no longer in the game.

The first player to play is the player to the dealer's left. Play always progresses in this clockwise direction. Each player has a choice at the beginning of their turn. They may either pick up one new card from the top of the stock or take the upcard. After the player draws their card, either from the stock or the upcard, they must then choose any card in their hand to discard by placing this card face up on the discard pile. That card then becomes the new upcard, which the next player in turn can take. If the next player chooses not to take the upcard, any other player may claim it. This is achieved by calling out for the card. The first player to call for the card takes it, as well as a penalty card from the deck.

=== Melding ===
The object of each hand is to come up with the correct combination of cards to be able to meld, or "lay out". The combination for each hand is different (see chart), and they become more difficult with each subsequent hand. The combinations for each hand are either sets or runs or a combination of both. A set is a combination of a specific number of cards of the same rank, and the suit is not important. A run is a combination of a specific number of cards of the same suit that have consecutive ranks. A player must have both a set of 3 cards and a run of 4 cards in their hand before they can meld in certain rounds.

A player can meld only when it is their turn. They must start their hand by drawing a card, then when they own the correct sequence of cards, they are allowed to meld or "go down" by laying their meld cards face up on the table in their correct sequence. Only their meld cards can be laid out and no additional cards. After melding, a player can then play on the melds of other players. Afterwards, any one card of the active player can then be discarded. If the player has no more cards in their hand after discarding, they are declared the winner of the hand. The player must have a discard and cannot discard a playable card. If the player does not have a discard, the player must draw as usual, play any cards playable, and then discard.

=== Play for the player who has gone down ===
When a player is "down" (already melded), they will still take their turn in turn with the other players, and must still draw a card and discard. A player who is down can play their cards on the melds (lay out) that have been completed by any player. For example, if a player has laid down a set of 3 8s, and the player draws 8s in the following turns, they can lay the card down on the set of 8s. All laid out cards in this manner must preserve the run or set's state of being a complete run or a set. If a run has a wild card in it, the player can replace the wild card with the appropriate card (that player can then place the wild card on any melds). For example, if the run had 5-6-Joker-8-9 of clubs, the Joker can be replaced with the 7 of clubs. Unlike the limitation of the number of wild cards in the original meld, there is no limitation as to how many wild cards can be put into a hand that is already down.

=== Winning the game ===
Play progresses until one of the players "goes out," meaning they are able to discard the last card in their hand. That player is then the winner of that hand, and the hand is then over. The winner for the hand gets zero points, and the other players count their cards to determine their score for the hand. After all seven hands are played, the winner is the player with the lowest score.

== Sequence of contracts ==
| Deal Number | Cards Needed to put down | Dealt cards | Contract |
|---|---|---|---|
| 1 | 6 | 10 (or 9) | 2 sets |
| 2 | 7 | 10 | 1 set and 1 run |
| 3 | 8 | 10 (or 11) | 2 runs |
| 4 | 9 | 10 (or 12) | 3 sets |
| 5 | 10 | 12 | 2 sets and 1 run |
| 6 | 11 | 12 | 1 set and 2 runs |
| 7 | 12 | 12 | 3 runs |

== Number of decks required by player count ==
- 2 decks: up to 4 people
- 3 decks: 5-6 people
- 4 decks: 7-8 people

The game supports up to two more players per added deck.

== Points ==
| Card | Point Value |
|---|---|
| 2-10 | Spot/Index value |
| Face Cards (J, Q, K) | 10 |
| Ace | 15 |
| Joker | 15 or 20 |

== See also ==
- Rummy
- Kalooki
- Shanghai rum
