= Rentoy =

Card game

Rentoy is a 16th-century Spanish and Mexican card game for two players or teams that involved signalling. It is mentioned in works by Cervantes.

== History ==
Rentoy is first mentioned by Cervantes (1547–1616) in The Illustrious Kitchen Maid along with a game called Presa y Pinta (possibly Lansquenet) and appears to have been a popular 16th and 17th century Spanish card game. It was still popular enough in the early 19th century to appear in an autobiography by Periquillo Sarniento in 1816.

It was the most popular game among Mexican soldiers in pulquieras (bars) and barracks. It required "careful and discrete communication by gesture or mutter between the partners, which all expected but ran contrary to the rules." It involved high stakes that could lead to alcohol-fuelled violence.

The game is still popular in parts of Mexico today.

== Play ==
In Cervantes' day it was a game for two to eight players, any more than two forming two teams. Players were dealt three cards each. There were points and trumps and players were allowed to signal to one another.

== Literature ==
- _ (1714). El Juego del Rentoy. 8 pp.
- di Lizardi, Jose Joaquin Fernandez (2004) [1816]. The Mangy Parrot. Indianapolis: Hackett. ISBN 0-87220-669-6
- Harney, Michael (2016). Exemplary Novellas. By Cervantes. Indianapolis: Hackett. ISBN 978-1-62466-449-6
- Neufeld, Stephen B. (2017). The Blood Contingent: The Military of the Making of Modern Mexico, 1876–1911. Albuquerque: University of New Mexico Press.
- Ife, Barry W. and Jonathan Thacker (2013). Cervantes: The Complete Exemplary Novels. Oxford: Oxbow. ISBN 978-0-856687-69-3
