= Continental Rummy =

Rummy card game

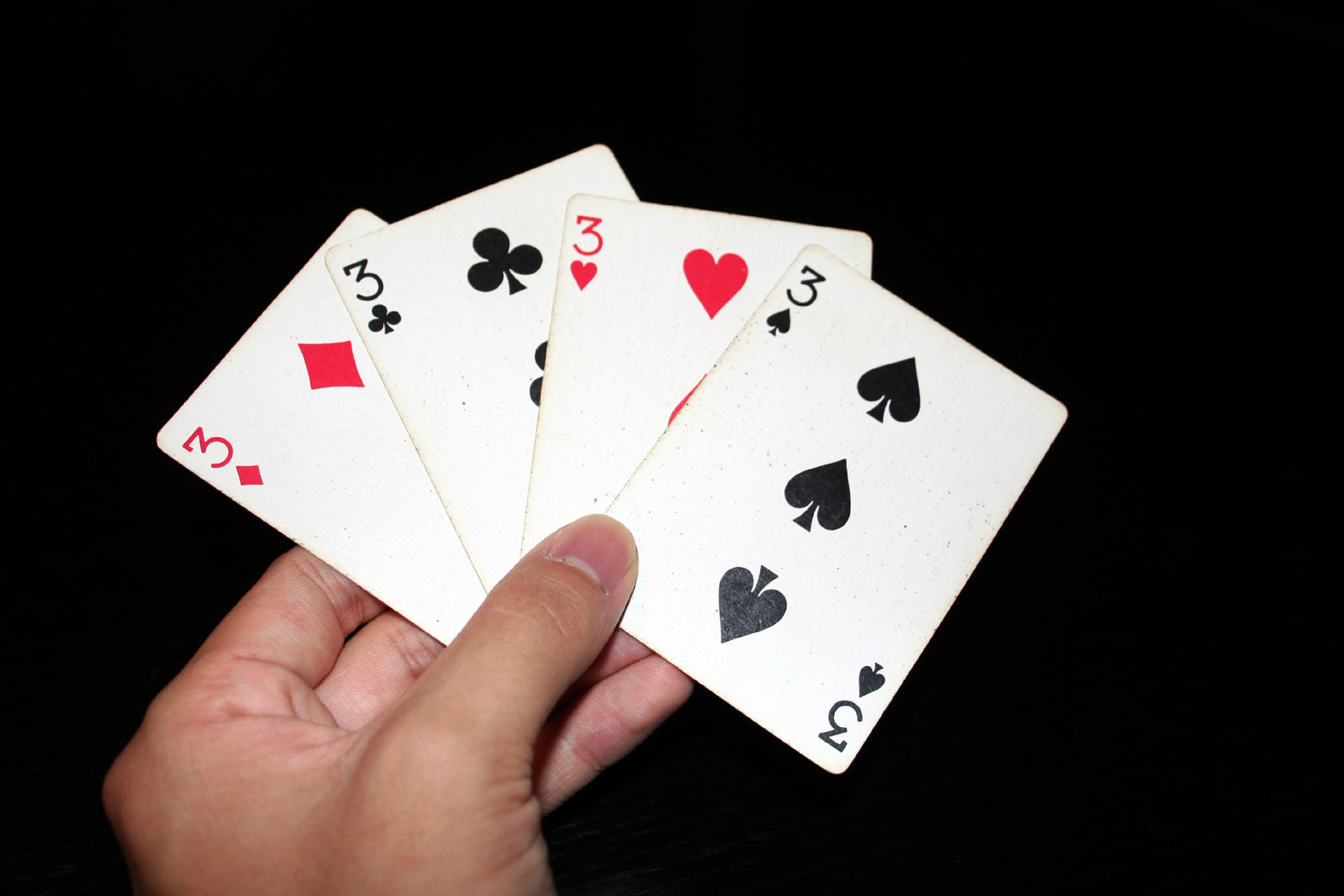
- Origin: United States
- Alternative names: Continental; May I? Double-deck rummy Žolíky
- Family: Matching
- Players: 4–8
- Skills: Strategy
- Cards: 108 cards
- Deck: Anglo-American
- Play: Clockwise
- Playing time: 20 min.
- Chance: Easy

Related games
- Contract rummy

Continental Rummy (also called Continental, May I?, and Double-deck rummy) is a progressive partnership Rummy card game related to Rumino. It is considered the forerunner of the whole family of rummy games using two packs of cards as one. Its name derives from the fact that it is played throughout continental Europe (especially in the Czech Republic and Slovakia where it is known as Žolíky), the United States, Mexico, Canada, and also in South America. According to Albert Morehead, it was "at one time the most popular form of Rummy in women's afternoon games, until in 1950 it lost out to Canasta."

== Object ==
The object of Continental Rummy is to be the player with the fewest penalty points after playing all seven hands. Everyone draws one card, the high card deals, and the subsequent deals are passed to the left.

Two 52-card decks are used plus two Jokers per deck. The number of decks used additional to the base of two is determined by dividing the number of players by two and rounding up, if needed. For example:

- 4 players use 2 decks
- 5 players use 3 decks
- 6 players use 3 decks
- 7 players use 4 decks
- 8 players use 4 decks

Each player is dealt 12 cards, the remaining stock pile is set on the table. Jokers and red Aces are wild. After a card is drawn, one must be discarded, and the next player to the left has the option of drawing either the top discard or top stock card then they must discard.

A set consists of three or more cards of the same face value, e.g., three queens, or three aces, or three sevens. A run consists of four or more cards of the same suit, in sequence. If there is an ace in the run, it can serve as either high card and/or low card, and can both in the same run. No run may contain more than 13 cards.

== Rules ==
=== Hands ===
Seven different deals, or hands, make up one game. Each hand consists of a combination of sets and runs, and there is a different opening requirement for each of the seven hands. The first hand requires a player to open, or "go down," with two sets. A minimum of six cards makes up the first hand's opening requirements, seven cards for the second hand, etc. Each successive hand needs one more card for the opening requirements, until the seventh hand, which requires twelve cards to open. Everyone moves on to the next hand together, regardless of whether they were able to go down during the previous hand.

Once a player has gone down by satisfying the requirements for that particular hand, they may not create any new sets or runs. While playing the first hand of two sets, no player may play three sets. Cards that remain in a player's hand may only be played onto the sets and runs already established on the table.

The sequence of seven hands is as follows:

Hand	Description	Minimum # of cards needed to open
1st	Two trios	6
2nd	One trio & one straight	7
3rd	Two straights	8
4th	Three trios	9
5th	Two trios & one straight	10
6th	Two straights & one trio	11
7th	Three straights	12

For those hands that require multiple runs, if a player goes down using the same suit for more than one straight, the straights can be played with contiguous card values. However, the player must separate these cards into two runs of four (or more) and can be played on separately, i.e. Player 1 goes down with 5–8 and 9-Q of spades, Player 2 (who is down) can play a 9 of spades on the first straight and an 8 on the second and so on. Multiple trios of the same value (number or face) can be played in this manner as well.

=== Deal ===
All players pick a card at random and return it to the deck, high card dealing first. Each hand starts a new deal, with the turn to deal passing from player to player, to the left. Cards are dealt one at a time, face down beginning at the dealer's left. The dealer deals 12 cards face down to each player, places the remainder of the pack face down in the middle, and places the top card from the stock pile face up next to it. Play starts with the player to the dealer's left and proceeds clockwise. If the first face-up card is a joker, it is played as any other card would be, i.e., the player to the dealer's left would have first choice to pick it up in turn.

=== Play ===
Beginning with the player to the left of the dealer, a person's turn begins by selecting either the top card from the stock pile, or the top card from the discard pile. If the player does not wish to select from the discard pile, any player in order of rotation to the left of the player may claim that card, but must also draw the top card from the stock pile as a penalty for picking out of turn, without discarding. Conventionally this desire is announced by saying "may I?", thus the alternative name of this game. If several players wish the top card, the priority goes to the desiring player closest in rotation to the current player. In such a case:

- The order of play is not changed,
- The player picking out of turn may not play any cards on the table until their next regular turn,
- Any remaining cards in the discard pile are ineligible for selection (dead), and
- The player whose turn was interrupted resumes play by selecting the top card from the stock pile.

As a point of strategy, it is occasionally advantageous to "may I" for a card not directly useful, in the hopes the penalty card will be useful.

If the player has not yet opened, and has the necessary cards to meet the opening requirements for that hand, they may then lay down the sets and runs appropriate for that hand. Having opened, the player is then free to play (in that same turn and in subsequent turns) additional cards onto existing sets or runs that have already been played on the table. A player may not put any cards into play until they have opened ("gone down").

Wild cards may be used to fill in missing cards in a set or a run, but the wilds can never outnumber the standard cards. Trios of wild cards can be played, however, and only wild cards can be played onto these trios. If a player doesn't verbally declare the value of a joker being played as part of a run, its value is implied by the position in which it is originally placed. If the player changes their mind as to which cards to play where, only the cards played in the current turn may be picked up for re-use. Wild cards cannot be rearranged on a straight to play another card, i.e. Player 1 has a straight of 4–8 of hearts, with a wild standing in for the 5. Player 2 (who is down) cannot play their 5 of hearts and move the wild card somewhere else in the straight.

During a player's regular turn, and only if they have already opened, a wild card already laid on the table as part of any run may be replaced by the card which it represents, taken from the player's hand. The wild card must then be played on the table to represent any card in any set or run. Wild cards that are part of a set may not be replaced.

The end of a turn occurs when a player discards one card onto the discard pile. Play then continues with the next player to the left.

=== Scoring ===
Since Continental Rummy is a game winnable based on the fewest points, you get 5 points for cards from 2–9. 10 and face cards count as 10 points. Aces are 20 points and Jokers are 50.

=== Variations ===
It is common for regional or house rules to develop. Examples include that "may I?"s are not allowed in the last three rounds, or using 2's as additional wild cards.

== Rules of play ==
=== Stock pile depletion ===
It is possible when many cards have been taken out of turn in a hand, resulting in many penalty cards, that the stock pile may dwindle down to nothing before any player has gone out. Should this happen, the discard pile is turned over once, without shuffling, and becomes the stock pile. Play then continues in order. If the remaining cards in the stock pile are depleted a second time without any player going out, the hand ends and all points remaining in all players' hands are tallied as they would be had someone gone out.

=== Incomplete hands and games ===
If all players agree, a game may be suspended between hands and later resumed, but only if all players are available when play resumes, and only if the game resumes in the same calendar year as it started. Players must be seated in the same relative positions to each other when the game resumes.

Any player not finishing a full game (one or more hands not played to completion) will post a game total equal to the sum of the two highest complete game totals posted by other players in that game. If two other complete game totals are not available in that game, all statistics for that game are discarded. Similarly, any player not providing a score for a particular hand that he or she played will post a score equal to the sum of the two highest scores posted by other players for that hand. If two other scores are not available in that hand, the hand is re-played.

=== Play out of turn ===
If a player going out of turn is not stopped before discarding, it stands as a play in turn and intervening players lose their turns. If the player out of turn has chosen to take the top card of the stock pile, it is too late for rectification after the player has added that card to their hand.

If it is not too late, as defined, to correct the error, the offender restores the card drawn, takes back any cards that he or she may have played, and play then reverts to the correct person, the rule Illegal Draw may apply.

=== Illegal Draw ===
If, by playing out of turn or by drawing more than one card from the top of the stock pile, a player sees a card to which they are not entitled, that card is placed face up on top of the stock pile. The next player in turn may either take the card or may have it placed face down in the center of the stock pile, and proceed to play as if no irregularity had occurred. If more than one card is so exposed at the top of the stock pile, the option of each player in turn is only to take the top such card remaining there, or the top face-down card of the stock pile, or the previous player's discard. That is, players have three options to draw from instead of the normal two, as long as exposed cards remain at the top of the stock pile.

A player's illegal draw may not be corrected after discarding, but the section on Incorrect Hand may apply.

=== Premature discard ===
Any player who discards without drawing may then draw from the stock pile to restore their hand to the proper number of cards, but may not lay down any cards after discarding. If the next player in turn has already drawn, the section on Incorrect Hand applies. A player who discards more than one card may retract either one, unless the next player has drawn it or unless the next player has already ended their turn.

=== Incorrect hand ===
- A player with too many cards discards without drawing.
- A player with too few cards draws without discarding; one card in each turn until the player's hand is restored to the correct number. This also applies to a player who draws too many cards and adds them to their hand before correction is required.
- A player may not lay down any cards in a turn when the hand is still incorrect.
- If, after a player goes out, another player has too many cards, they simply count the value of all cards in the hand.
- If a player has too few cards, they are charged 10 points for each missing card.
- If any player goes out and is found to have too few cards, they take back all cards that were laid down in that turn, and play continues.

=== Re-deal ===
There must be a re-deal, by the same dealer, if more than one card is exposed in dealing or if more than one card is found face up in the pack. A player who is dealt an incorrect number of cards may demand a re-deal before drawing in their first turn, but not after that. There must be a re-deal at any time it is discovered that the pack is incorrect, but the results of previous deals are not affected.

=== Cards laid down illegally ===
Any cards which are superfluous in an otherwise correct set or run must be returned to the original player's hand as soon as they are discovered. Any cards that may have been added to the incorrect set or run remain on the table. Play then proceeds as if no irregularity had occurred.

=== Scoring errors ===
An error in counting a hand may not be corrected after that hand has been mixed with other cards. However, if an error in scoring is discovered when there had previously been no dispute, an agreed upon correction may be made at any time.

== See also ==
- Pope Joan (card game)
- Rumino
- Pope Julius (card game)
- Rummy Game
