= Gin rummy =

Card game

Gin Rummy
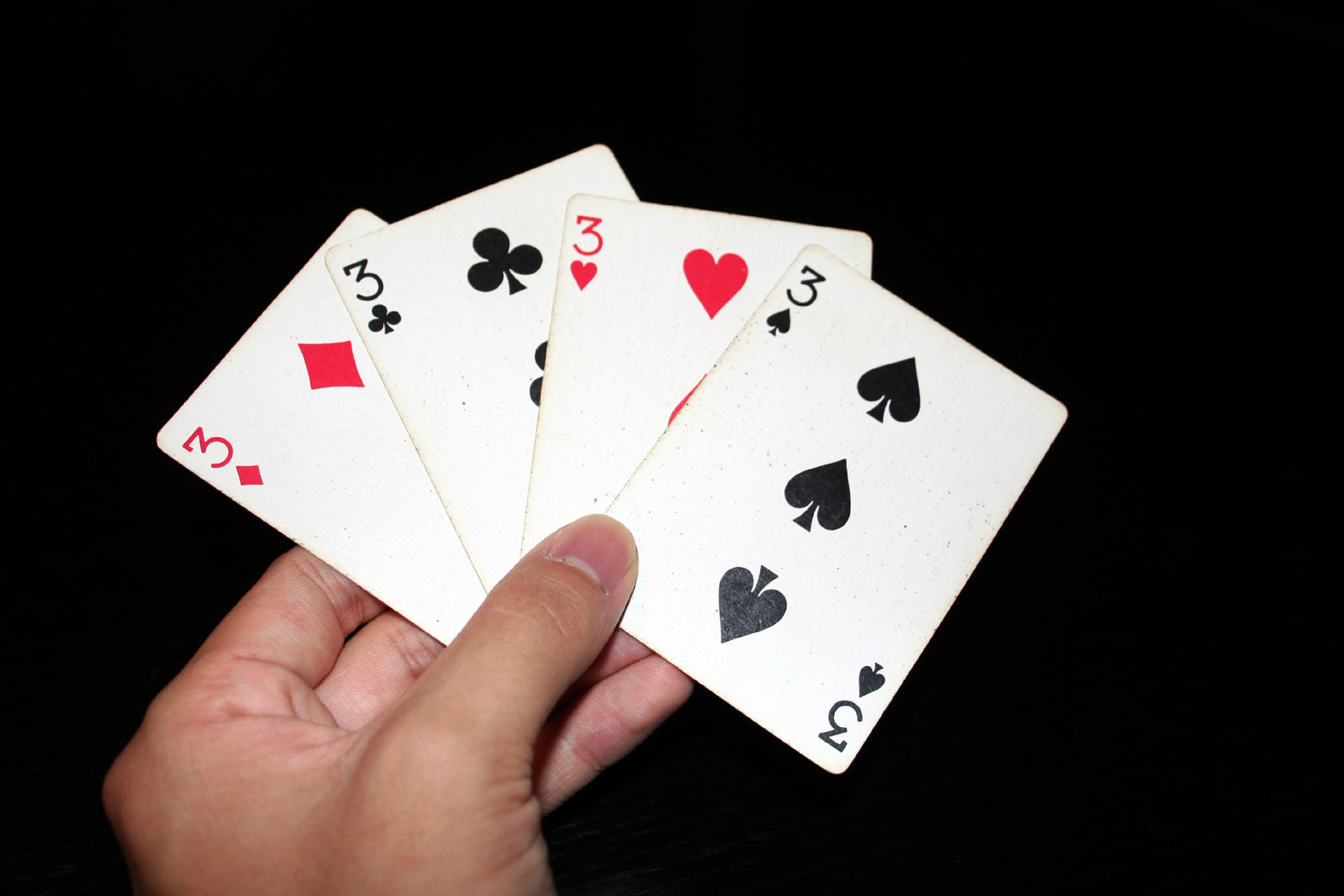
- A meld of four cards
- Origin: United States
- Alternative names: gin, knock poker, poker gin, gin poker
- Type: Matching
- Players: 2
- Skills: Memory, tactics, strategy
- Cards: 52
- Deck: French
- Rank (high→low): K Q J 10 9 8 7 6 5 4 3 2 A
- Play: Clockwise
- Playing time: 15 min.
- Chance: Low

Related games
- Conquian • Desmoche • Rummy • Viennese Rummy

Gin rummy, or simply gin, is a two-player card game variant of Rummy. It has enjoyed widespread popularity as both a social and a gambling game, especially during the mid twentieth century, and remains today one of the most widely played two-player card games.

== History ==
Gin rummy was created in 1909 by Elwood T. Baker and his son C. Graham Baker. The game remained local to New York until 1941, when it was publicized throughout the United States after becoming a Hollywood fad. In 1947, a survey by an association of U.S. playing card manufacturers concluded that the number of people who learned gin rummy during World War II was equal to the number that learned to play pinochle, cribbage, poker, and bridge combined.

Magician and writer John Scarne believed gin rummy to have evolved from 19th-century whiskey poker (a game similar to commerce, with players forming poker combinations) and to have been created with the intention of being faster than standard rummy but less spontaneous than knock rummy. Card game historian David Parlett finds Scarne's theory to be "highly implausible", and considers the game of Conquian to be gin rummy's forerunner.

== Deck ==
Gin rummy is played using a standard deck of 52 cards. The ranking from high to low is King, Queen, Jack, 10, 9, 8, 7, 6, 5, 4, 3, 2, Ace.

== Objective ==
The objective in gin rummy is to be the first to reach an agreed-upon score, usually 100 points.

The basic game strategy is to improve one's hand by melds and eliminating deadwood. Gin has two types of meld: Sets of three or four cards sharing the same rank, e.g. 8♥ 8♦ 8♠; and runs or sequences of three or more cards in the same suit, such as 3♥ 4♥ 5♥ or more. Deadwood cards are those not in any meld. Aces are considered low—they can form a set with other aces but only the low end of runs (A♠ 2♠ 3♠ is a legal run but Q♠ K♠ A♠ is not). A player can form any combination of melds within their hand; all sets, all runs, or some sets and some runs.

== Deal ==
Dealership alternates from round to round, with the first dealer chosen by any agreed upon method. The dealer deals ten cards to each player one at a time starting with their opponent, and then places the next card in the deck face up. This begins the discard pile. The face down pile is known as the stock pile.

== Play ==
On the first turn of the round, the non-dealer has first option of taking the upcard on the discard pile or passing. If the non-dealer takes the upcard, they must then discard a different card to the discard pile. The player acting second can take the top card from the pile of their choice. However, if the non-dealer passes the upcard, the dealer is given the opportunity to take the upcard or pass. If the dealer also passes, the non-dealer must draw from the stock pile, then the next turn and after, players can draw from the pile of their choice.

On each subsequent turn, a player must draw either the (face-up) top card of the discard pile, or the (face-down) top card from the stock pile, and discard one card from their hand onto the discard pile. If a player chooses to draw face-up card (from the discard pile) the discarded card cannot be the just drawn card.

Players alternate taking turns until one player ends the round by declaring the hand over (knocking), or until only two cards remain in the stock pile, in which case the round ends in a draw and no points are awarded. The game ends when a player reaches 100 or more points (or another established amount). In tournament rules the game is played in best of five with 250 points per game.

=== Knocking ===
In standard gin, a player with 10 or fewer points of deadwood may knock, immediately ending the hand without giving the opponent a chance to play. Knocking with no deadwood is known as going gin or having a gin hand, while knocking with deadwood points is known as going down.

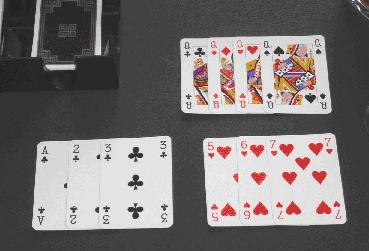
A Gin hand, with one set of four cards and two runs of three cards each.

When discarding to end a turn, a player who wishes to knock must clearly indicate their intent; this is generally shown by laying the discard face down, but can also be done through a verbal declaration or by tapping the playing surface. The player then lays out their hand, organized into melds and with any deadwood separated from them. The opponent, or "defending" player, shows their melds and is entitled to lay off any deadwood cards that fit into the knocking player's melds, provided that the knocking player does not go Gin.

The deadwood count is the sum of the point values of the deadwood cards. Aces are scored at one point, face cards at 10, and others according to their numerical values. Intersecting melds are not allowed; if a player has a three-card set and a three-card run sharing a common card, only one of the melds counts, and the other two cards count as deadwood. For example; within the five cards 7♣ 7♠ 7♦ 8♦ 9♦, the seven of diamonds can be included in the set (7♣ 7♠ 7♦) or included in the run (7♦ 8♦ 9♦), but it cannot be included in both.

For example, suppose that the knocking player has a meld of three Kings. If the defending player is holding the fourth King as deadwood, they may lay it off by adding it to the meld and thus reduce their deadwood count by 10.

The difference in the two players' deadwood counts determines the score for the hand as follows.

- If the knocking player has the lower count, they score points equal to the difference.
- The defending player can undercut the knocking player by having a lower or equal count. In this case, the defending player scores the difference plus a bonus (usually 25 points, sometimes 15 or 10). An undercut may occur either before or after the defending player has laid off any deadwood.

The knocking player can never lay off their deadwood into the defending player's melds.

A player who goes Gin (i.e. has no deadwood) gets a bonus (typically 25 points).

=== Big Gin ===
A player holding a Gin hand may also choose to continue the round instead of revealing it, in hopes of attaining an 11-card Big Gin hand as follows.

If a player draws or takes a card that can be used to form melds with the 10 cards already held, the player declares Big Gin and the hand ends. That player scores a Big Gin bonus (typically 31 points) plus the defending player's deadwood count; that player may not lay off any cards.

== Scoring ==
Aces are scored at 1 point, face cards at 10, and all other cards are scored at their numerical values. The number of points awarded for bonuses may vary from region to region.

Knock points
After a player knocks, and the layoffs are made, the knocking player receives a score equal to the difference between the two hands. For example, if a player knocks with 8, and the defender has 10 deadwood points in their hand after laying off, the knocking player receives 2 points for the hand. If a player is able to knock before any cards are accepted, it is considered a misdeal.
Gin bonus
After going Gin, a player receives a bonus of 25 points plus the entire count of deadwood in the opponent's hand. There is no chance to lay off when a player goes Gin. In early official rules, the Gin bonus was 20 points.
Undercut (or underknocking)
Occurs when the defending player has a deadwood count lower than or equal to that of the knocking player (this can occur either naturally or by laying off after a knock). In this case, the defender scores an undercut bonus of 25 points plus the difference in deadwood in the knocking player's hand. In other rule sets, the bonus is 20. In early official rules, the bonus was only 10 points, and was not awarded in case of a tie.
Game bonus
Once a player has acquired 100 points (200, 500 or some other agreed-upon number) the game is over, and that player receives a game bonus of 100 points.
Line bonus or box bonus
In some variations, this is added at the end of the game. For every hand a player won during the game, 25 points is added to their score.
Big Gin
Prior to knocking, if all 11 cards in a player's hand form a legal Gin, the player can retain the extra card as part of their hand, and is awarded 31 points plus entire count of deadwood in their opponent's hand. (In some rule sets players may be awarded 50 points or another established amount plus the entire count of deadwood in the opponent's hand)
Shutout bonus
If a game is completed with the winner having won every hand, the points for each hand are doubled before adding the line bonus.

In some variations, if a match ends with one player in the lead by exactly 50 points, that player automatically loses.

== Variations ==
=== Straight gin ===
In straight Gin, players are required to play until one of them can go Gin. Knocking is not allowed. Scoring and rules remain the same as standard gin rummy.

=== Mahjong gin ===
Similar to straight Gin, knocking is not allowed. However, more than one card may be taken, in order, from the top of the discard pile. If more than one card is taken, the lowest position card taken must be used in a hand: e.g. <bottom> 8♠ 3♥ 5♥ <top of discard> 8♠ is the lowest position card and must be used in a hand; continue with one discard. Cards are shown to the table, with opponents being able to add on to straights of the same suit or finish a three of a kind with the fourth card for points. After a player has Gin, points are added, with cards on the table being added up and cards in hand being subtracted. The player who Gins receives 25 additional points, 2 through 9 = 5 points, 10 through K = 10 points, A = 15 points.

=== Oklahoma gin ===
In this version of gin rummy, the value of the first upcard is used to determine the maximum count at which players can knock. If the upcard is a spade, the hand will count double. So if the first upcard was a 4, you can knock and go out with only 4 or fewer points in your hand; and if the card was 4♠, you would get double points that hand. In this variation it is possible to knock any of cards from the discard pile so as long as you put down a suit or pair.

Another version in this variation (mostly in match play) and in Hollywood Gin (see below), a second deck of cards will be used to determine the knock value of a hand. The knock value card will be dealt from the bottom and turned over on top. Above rules apply but both players are dealt ten cards with the last hand winner picking first from the deck.

=== Hollywood gin ===
In the 1942 laws of gin rummy published in New York by Ely Culbertson's Bridge World and prepared by a rules committee of bridge players, the scoring format for Hollywood Gin was published as a way to play "simultaneous games". This is a scoring style, not a rules change to the game of Gin.

In Hollywood Gin, scoring is kept for three different games at the same time. A player's first win will be recorded in their column in Game One. A player's second win will be recorded in their columns for both Game One and Game Two. Their third win will be recorded in their column for all three games. Every game after that is scored in all three columns after that Game 1, Game 2 & Game 3. Once a game (column) is finished bonus are added to that game and hands are played until all three games are finished. Once all three games are finished the totals are added together for a total score.

=== Tedesco Gin ===
Similar to Oklahoma Gin, except aces can be used high or low, and runs can be formed "around the corner" (such as K♠ A♠ 2♠). If you are caught with an unmelded ace, it counts as 15 points against you. Hollywood scoring of three games to 200 when playing head-to-head or with two-person teams. Three-person teams play to 300, 25 points extra if all three teammates win. 50 points for four-person team, etc. This is a more complex Gin game for all levels of player.

=== Single match ===
When a single match is to be played, the players will continue to play rounds until one player has 100 points or more. This player wins the match.

=== Multi-match ===
In multi-match games, match scores are reset to zero with the start of each match, while game scores accumulate until a predetermined winning score is reached, perhaps 500 or higher. Each individual match ends when one player scores 100 match points. At the end of the match, players' match scores are credited toward their game scores, as well as:

- 25 game points for each individual round won,
- 100 game points to the winner of the match, and
- 100 bonus game points to the match winner if the loser won no rounds.

== Notable players ==
- Stu Ungar, widely regarded as the greatest gin rummy player of all time, was described by many as having a near clairvoyant ability to see his opponents' hands. Ungar's almost total dominance of the game during the 1970s and 1980s is thought to have been a factor in the decline of gin rummy as a tournament game in Las Vegas and other gambling venues. (Ungar eventually switched to poker.)
- Oswald Jacoby, best known as a contract bridge and backgammon champion, also played high-stakes gin rummy and wrote several books on the game.
- Ernie Kovacs, the comedian and television pioneer, published a book in 1962 called How to Talk at Gin.

Fictional characters

- In The Apartment the protagonists Buddy Baxter (Jack Lemmon) and Fran Kubelik (Shirley MacLaine) play the game while she is recovering.
- The villain Auric Goldfinger cheats at gin rummy in the key introduction scene of the James Bond film Goldfinger (1964), with the help of an accomplice looking at the opponent's cards through binoculars. The film script changed the game to gin rummy from two-handed Canasta in the source novel by Ian Fleming.
- In The Golden Girls, Sophia Petrillo and her daughter, Dorothy Zbornak, spend the entire night playing gin rummy, with Dorothy trying to beat her mother's endless winning streak, but to no avail.
- In Episode 7 of Season 4 of Downton Abbey, the Dowager Lady Grantham and Isobel Crawley play this game, following a bout of bronchitis in Lady Grantham through which Mrs. Crawley nursed her. Lady Grantham seems to enjoy the game, and Mrs. Crawley remarks that it can go on for ages.

== See also ==
- Canasta
- Conquian
- Carioca (card game)
- Rumino
- Rummy
- The Gin Game
- Tonk
