= Mila =

Mila may refer to:

== People ==
- Mila (given name), including a list of people and characters with the name
- Mila (surname), list of people with the surname
- Milá (footballer) (born 1977), Brazilian football player, real name Reginelson Aparecido Paulino Quaresma

== Places ==
- Mila, Algeria, a city and commune
- Mila Province, Algeria
- Mila District, Mila Province, Algeria
- Mila, Virginia, an unincorporated community
- Mila, a subdistrict of the Pidie Regency in Indonesia

== Other uses ==
- Mila (research institute), an AI research institute in Montreal
- Mila (2001 film), a Filipino drama film
- Mila (2021 film), an animated short film
- Mila, also known as Apples, a 2020 Greek drama film
- Mila, a synonym for the genus of moth Mazuca
- Mila (footballer) (born 2003), full name Lucas Eduardo Muller, Brazilian football midfielder
- Mila (plant), a genus of cactus
- Merritt Island Spaceflight Tracking and Data Network station, a NASA radio communications and spacecraft tracking complex
- Mercado Integrado Latinoamericano, the integrated stock exchange markets of Chile, Colombia, and Peru
- Mila (album), by Princ od Vranje
- "Mila" (song), by Princ od Vranje
- M.I.L.A. (EP), by Mila J

== See also ==
- Miła 18, a bunker used in the Warsaw Ghetto uprising
  - Mila 18, a novel named after it
- Milas (disambiguation)
- Milla (disambiguation)
- Myla (disambiguation)
