= Milla (disambiguation) =

Milla is a plant genus.

Milla may also refer to:

== Arts and entertainment ==
- Milla, a character in the Seventh Tower book series
- Milla Basset, a character in the video game Freedom Planet
- Milla Donovan, a character in the Marvel comic book series Daredevil
- Milla Maxwell, a character in the video game Tales of Xillia
- Milla Vodello, a character in the video game Psychonauts

== People ==
=== Given name ===
- Milla Baldo-Ceolin (1924–2011), Italian particle physicist
- Milla Clementsdotter (1812–1892), Swedish Southern Sami Laestadian
- Milla Davenport (1871–1936), American actress
- Milla Jovovich (born 1975), American actress
- Milla Saari (born 1975), Finnish cross-country skier
- Milla Sannoner (1938–2003), Italian actress
- Milla Viljamaa (born 1980), Finnish musician

=== Surname ===
- Cristian Milla (born 1984), Argentine footballer
- Jimmy Lemi Milla (1948–2011), Sudanese politician
- José Justo Milla (1794–1838), Honduran military leader
- Luis Milla (footballer, born 1966), Spanish footballer
- Pasquale Di Milla (1869–1940), Italian priest
- Roger Milla (born 1952), Cameroonian footballer
- Soraya Milla (born 1989), French filmmaker

== Places ==
- Milla, Burkina Faso
- Milla, Illinois, United States

== Other uses ==
- Milla (unit), the Spanish mile of about 1,392 meters

== See also ==
- Camilla (disambiguation)
  - Queen Camilla (born 1947), consort of Charles III and known as Milla among her classmates
- Mila (disambiguation)
- Millas, France
- Millia, a female given name
- Millie (disambiguation)
