= Mille =

Mille can refer to:

== People ==
- Constantin Mille, Romanian journalist and politician
- Mathieu Mille, French ice hockey player
- Mille (singer), Danish singer and songwriter

== Places ==
- Mille Lacs County, Minnesota
- Mille Lacs Lake in Minnesota.
- Mille River, a tributary of the Awash River in Ethiopia
- Mille (woreda), a district in Ethiopia
- An alternative spelling for Mili Atoll

== Transportation ==
- Aprilia RSV Mille, a motorcycle.
- Fiat Mille, the Brazilian Fiat Uno in its 1.0 L version
- Mille Miglia, an open-road endurance race which took place in Italy twenty-four times from 1927 to 1957

== Other uses ==
- Mille (card game), a card game for two players
- Mille (TV series), a Danish television series
- "Mille" (song), an Italian pop song
- Mill (currency), or mille, a now-abstract currency
- Per mille, parts per thousand
  - Cost per mille used in advertising
- I Mille 'The Thousand', the volunteers in the Expedition of the Thousand, a military action of the Italian Risorgimento, 1860

== See also ==
- DeMille
- Mill (disambiguation)
- Mille Bornes, another French card game
- Mille-feuille, a pastry made of several layers of puff pastry
- Mille Plateaux (record label)
- Millie (disambiguation)
