= Mille (card game) =

- The queen of spades, worth 100 points in Mille
- Origin: Canada
- Type: Matching
- Players: 2
- Cards: 104
- Deck: Anglo-American
- Play: Clockwise

Related games
- Canasta

Mille is a two-player card game requiring two standard 52-card decks. Mille is a rummy game similar to canasta in the respects that if a player picks up cards from the discard pile, the player picks up the entire pile, and the only legal melds are three or more cards of a same rank.

== Origins ==
The two-player rummy game Mille is said to have been devised in Montreal, Québec and from there brought to Toronto in the 1990s. It has since become increasingly popular.

== Basic rules ==
The dealer deals 15 cards to their opponent and themself, then turns over a card from the deck.

On a player's turn, they have two options: pick up the "pack", or draw a card from the deck. If the player has a pair in their hand of the last card discarded, they have the option of picking the pack up. The only exception to this rule is if the up card opened immediately after the deal is a 2. The player can pick it up; they don't have to use it immediately or have a pair of 2's. When picking up the pack, the player must immediately lay the pair in their hand and the last card discarded. For example: The pack is 3-4-5-K-3-7. One player discards a 9. The other player has a pair of 9's in their hand. They can take the 9 from the pack, lay the pair of 9's on the table with the discarded 9, then pick up the 3-4-5-K-3-7 and place in their hand.

If the player is unable to pick up the pack or elects not to, they must draw a card from the deck.

During a player's turn, they can lay at least three cards matching in rank on the table. The player can also add cards to previous sets laid on their side. After laying cards, the player must discard one card into the pack. It is then the other player's turn.

The hand ends when one player has no more cards left in their hand and has all of their cards laid on the table. A player must declare when they have just two or one card left in their hand. After a player "goes out", each player counts the points on their side of the table, subtracting the value of the cards remaining in their hand. The game is over when a player reaches 1,200 points. For example: If an opponent "goes out" with 140 points laid. Their total would be 140 for that hand. If the other player had 235 points laid, but 60 in their hand, their total would be 175 for that hand.

=== Point values ===
Each card in Mille has a point value:

- 3's through 9's are worth 5 points each
- 10's through Kings are worth 10 points each
- Aces are worth 15 points each
- 2's, which are also wild, are worth 20 points each

There are also two special cards that hold extra value:

- The Queen of Spades is worth 100 points, not 10
- The Jack of Diamonds is worth 50 points, not 10

=== Wild card ===
All 2's in the decks act as wild cards and can be used as any card. For example, a player could lay Q-Q-2. However, a 2 cannot be used as a wild card to pick up a card from the pack (but two 2's can be used to pick up a discarded 2).

=== Going out ===
A player goes out when they have played all of their cards. A player doesn't have to discard when going out, but can if necessary.

For example, if a player draws a Q and now has a hand of Q-Q-Q-K-K-2-7, the player could discard the 7 and lay the Q-Q-Q and K-K-2 down. If a player draws a Q and now has a hand of Q-Q-Q-K-K-K, they could lay both sets without a discard.

=== Naturals ===
A natural occurs when a player goes out without using a 2 as a wild card on their board. A player could play 2-2-2 as a set, which would still count as a natural. If a player goes out on a natural, all of their points would count for double and they would receive a "mark".

A natural also occurs when a player lays all 8 cards of a rank. If a player lays the natural, the cards making the natural would be worth double. For example, if a player lays 8 Kings, they would receive 160 points for the cards and they would receive a "mark". When a player has 7 cards of a single rank laid down, they must push the spread into one pile (to warn the other player they only need one more of that rank to make a natural). If a player obtains 8 cards of a rank (thus making a natural), they turn that pile of eight cards upside down to signify making the natural.

=== Chapeaus ===
A chapeau occurs when an opponent goes out and the other player has a negative score for the hand. If a player chapeaus their opponent, they would receive a "mark".

=== Skunk ===
A skunk occurs when an opponent wins the game and the other player has less than 600 total points. If a player skunks their opponent, they would receive a "mark".

=== Scoring ===
One player keeps score for the game. After every hand is complete and both players have totaled their hands, the score keeper adds the score to their current total.

To mark a chapeau, the score keeper circles the score of the chateaued player. To mark a natural, the score keeper places a star next to the score. A typical score card of Mille might look similar to this:

Player A	Player B	Comments
140	350	
430	510	
650*	590	Player A received a natural in the hand
800	540	Player B's score would be circled due to the chapeau
940	840*	Player B received a natural in the hand
1150	1030	
1275	1180	Player A wins the game

=== Wagering ===
Many players of Mille find the game more entertaining when money is involved.

A small game of Mille would be what's called $1–$3. This means that a player would win $3 for winning the game, $3 for any marks attained throughout the game, and $1 for every 100 points they win by, rounding up.

In the case of the game above, Player A would win the following:

- $3 for winning the game
- $3 for the natural
- $3 for the chapeau
- $1 for winning by 95

The loser of the game wins nothing.

== See also ==
- Biriba
- Buraco
- Canasta
