= Culver Studios =

American movie studio in California, opened 1918

The Culver Studios
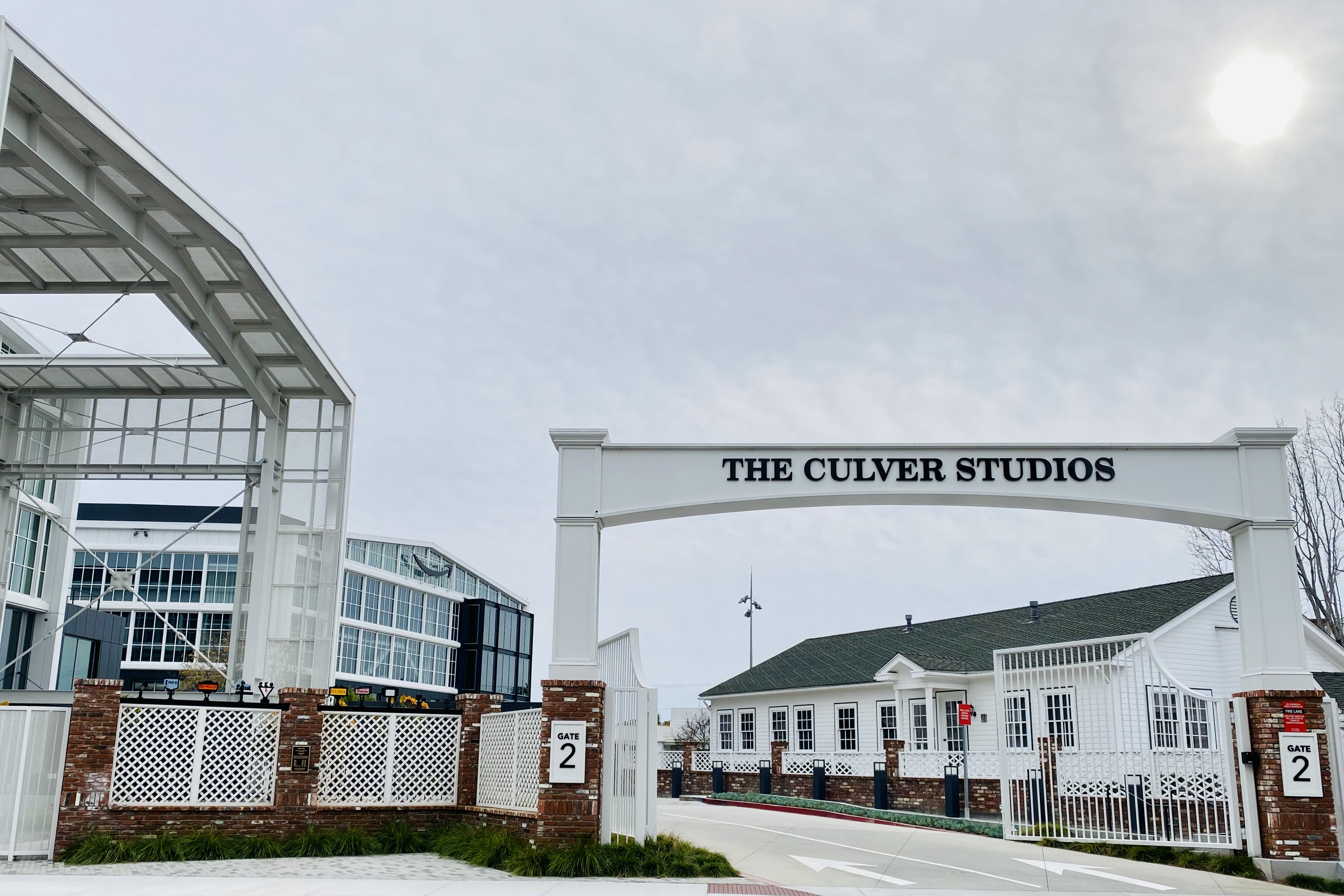
- Culver Studios, Gate 2
- Former names: Ince Studio; De Mille Studios; Pathé Studios; RKO-Pathé Studios; Selznick International Pictures; Desilu-Culver Studios; Culver City Studios; Laird International Studios

General information
- Location: 9336 West Washington Boulevard; Culver City, California; 90232
- Coordinates: 34.023894°N 118.392475°W
- Current tenants: Amazon MGM Studios
- Completed: 1918; 108 years ago
- Owner: Hackman Capital Partners

Design and construction
- Developer: Thomas H. Ince
- Known for: Movie studio

Website
- theculverstudios.com

The Culver Studios is a film studio in Culver City, California. Originally created by silent movie pioneer Thomas H. Ince, the studios have operated under a multitude of names: Ince Studio (1918–1925), De Mille Studios (1925–1928), Pathé Studios (1928–1931), RKO-Pathé Studios (1931–1935), Selznick International Pictures (1935–1956), Desilu-Culver Studios (1956–1970), Culver City Studios (1970–1977), and Laird International Studios (1977–1986).

Many classics from Hollywood's Golden Age were filmed there, including King Kong (1933) Gone with the Wind (1939), A Star is Born (1937), Intermezzo (1939), and Rebecca (1940).

The Culver Studios was also used for television shows such as The Andy Griffith Show, Lassie, Batman, The Nanny, and, more recently, Scrubs, Arrested Development, and Cougar Town.

Eccentric businessman Howard Hughes once had a stake in the studio as well as filmmakers Cecil B. DeMille and David O. Selznick. It was purchased in 2014 by Hackman Capital Partners, which completely modernized the lot over the next four years, while preserving the site's historic structures.

== History ==
=== Ince Studio ===
The Culver Studios was founded in 1918 by silent movie actor, director, and producer Thomas H. Ince after he acquired land from real estate developer Harry Culver. The Thomas H. Ince Studio, as it was originally known, was designed and constructed by the architectural firm of Meyer & Holler. Ince had grand ambitions to create his own studio unique from all the others. The first building to go up on the lot was "The Mansion" - a picturesque Colonial-styled administrative building with a white facade and grand columns overlooking manicured lawns. It was modeled after George Washington's home at Mount Vernon, Virginia.

The studio became the second major motion picture concern in Culver City acquired by Amazon MGM Studios.

=== DeMille Studios ===
Ince operated the studio until his early death in 1924, and the following year, his widow sold the property to Cecil B. DeMille, who renamed it DeMille Studios. DeMille ran the lot for two years, during which time the site underwent several large-scale expansions and renovations, including the construction of the DeMille theater and a replica of the streets of Jerusalem for his film The King of Kings (1927).

Despite a couple of major box office hits, DeMille failed to make the studio financially sustainable and merged his company with Pathé Exchange Inc. in 1928. DeMille signed a three-picture deal with Metro-Goldwyn-Mayer and the lot remained under the ownership of a conglomerate of companies.

=== RKO-Pathé studios ===
Another merger took place in 1932, when RKO (Radio-Keith-Orpheum) Pictures bought Pathé. To distinguish it from its Hollywood property, the site operated under the name RKO-Pathé studios. Further improvements took place and stars Bette Davis, Robert Mitchum, Cary Grant, and Katharine Hepburn all saw their careers continue to blossom while filming on the lot. Sets were also used in the original version of King Kong (1933).

==== Selznick International Pictures ====
RKO rented out the lot for virtually the entirety of its ownership and seldom used the space to shoot its own productions. From 1935 to 1946, the site was leased to Selznick International Pictures, owned by David O. Selznick, and it underwent more renovations. Selznick is best remembered for being the producer of Gone With the Wind (1939) and entire abandoned sets on the backlot were set ablaze early in its production schedule to recreate the burning of Atlanta scenes.

After 1946, RKO-Pathé resumed operation of the site and leased the space to David O. Selznick's new Vanguard Films Inc., as well as a variety of other independent production companies. Tycoon and movie producer Howard Hughes bought the studio in 1950 and continued to lease out the space to production companies until he sold RKO Pictures to General Tire.

=== Desilu Studios ===
Desilu Productions, owned by Lucille Ball and Desi Arnaz, purchased the lot from General Tire for $6 million in 1957 (approximately $62 million in 2022 when adjusted for inflation) and television soon became the primary business conducted on the site.

Perfect Film & Chemical Corporation purchased Desilu Studios from Gulf+Western in 1968, only to sell it to OSF Industries in 1969.

=== Culver Studios ===
In 1970, Desilu Studios was renamed the Culver City Studios. In 1977, the studio was renamed Laird International Studios, which was a rental facility. In a Chapter 11 bankruptcy in December 1986, the studio was purchased by GTG Entertainment, a joint venture between Grant Tinker and the Gannett Company for $24 million. GTG remodeled the studio and renamed the lot to the Culver Studios, which was acquired by Sony Pictures for $80 million in June 1991.

In April 2004, the Culver Studios was bought by a private investment group called Studio City Los Angeles for $125 million. It included Lehman Brothers, Pacific Coast Capital, and Pacifica Ventures.

In honor of its original owner, Thomas H. Ince, the street running through the middle of the studio has been named Ince Boulevard.

In March 2014, the Culver Studios was purchased by another private investment group, Hackman Capital Partners (HCP). When rumors persisted that the lot would be replaced by condominiums, HCP CEO Michael Hackman debunked those claims. However, Hackman said that the studio will be renovated to take advantage of modern technology, as well as adding extra parking and production space.

== Facilities ==
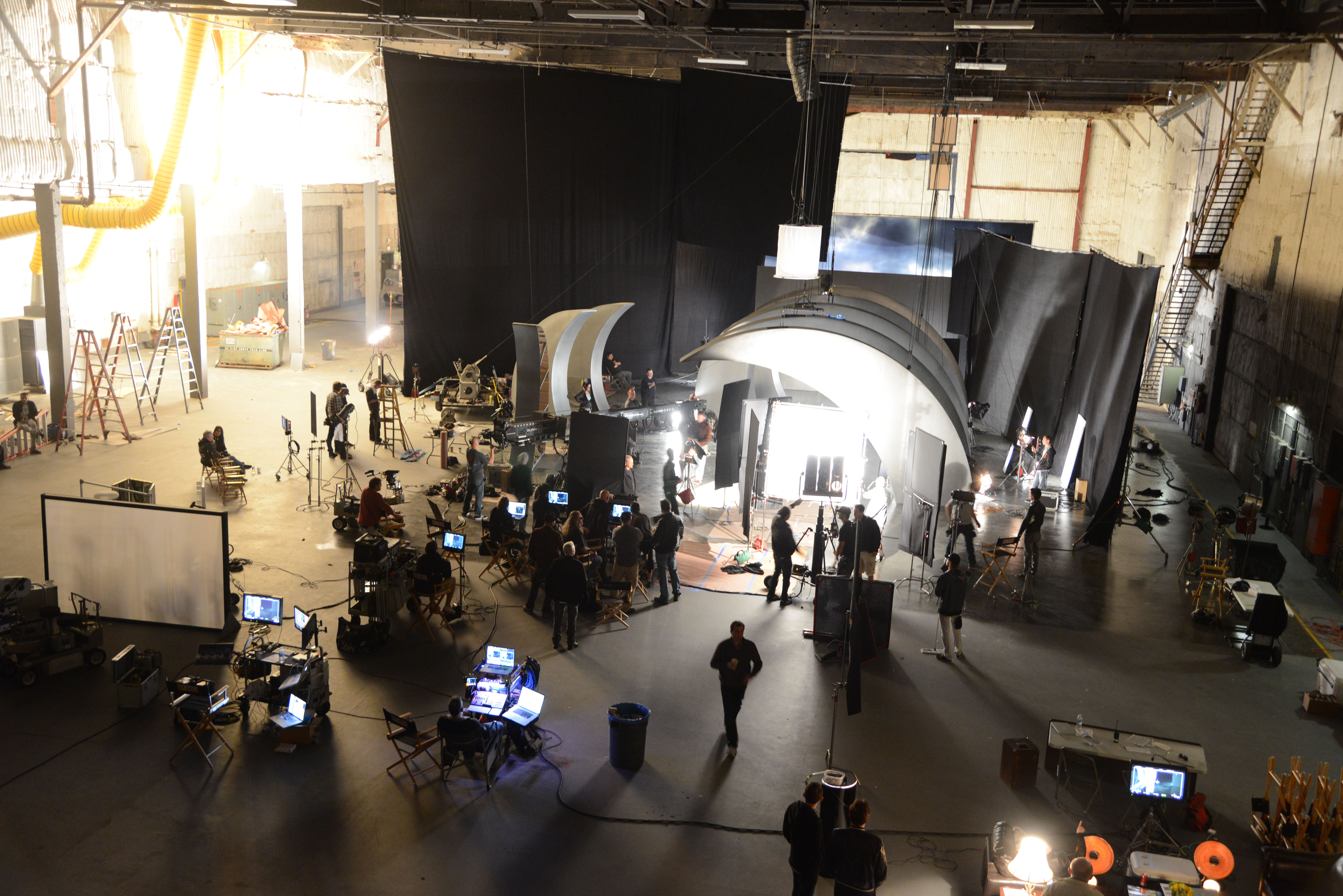
Commercial shoot on stage 3 of Culver Studios

The Culver Studios formerly had 13 sound stages, on-site offices, a screening theatre, fitness facility, medical services, and parking.

=== Site development ===
Throughout its history, Culver Studios continued to undergo numerous expansions and adaptations to meet the changing needs of the movie industry. The major works took place between 1918 and 1946, during the tenures of Thomas H. Ince, Cecil B. DeMille, RKO Pictures, and David O. Selznick.

Ince built the original studio, now known as the Culver Studios, on a 14-acre site. When the lot was bought by Cecil B. DeMille in 1925, large scale site renovations began. He reoriented the existing stages and moved numerous office bungalows and production service buildings. To match production needs, Stage 2 (now known as Stages 2/3/4), four new double-barrelled projection rooms, and seven new cutting rooms were added to the studio site.

In 1930, under the ownership of Pathé Exchange, the area was again renovated and redesigned. The arrival of talking pictures brought a massive new growth to Hollywood and an increased demand for movies. RKO-Pathé Studios built two large stage facilities (stages 7/8/9 and 11/12/14) and several production service buildings.

It was not until David O. Selznick's time at the helm, from 1935 to 1946, that the studios became fully built out and included new on-site bungalows. A final stage facility was built (stages 15/16) and the main studio site was developed to closely resemble the current layout.

In late 2018, Hackman Capital Partners broke ground on a $620-million expansion of the Culver Studios, which has become the new home of Amazon Studios. The expansion project added 413,000 square feet of rentable space to the 14-acre campus - increasing its total footprint to more than 720,000 square feet. Plans included two parking structures, with total accommodations for 1,930 vehicles. Amazon announced its move to the Culver Studios in late 2017. In addition, it leased the entirety of the adjacent Culver Steps development, also being built by Hackman Capital Partners. The combined 600,000 square feet of space houses Amazon subsidiaries Amazon MGM Studios, IMDb, and Amazon Prime Video.

=== Mansion House ===
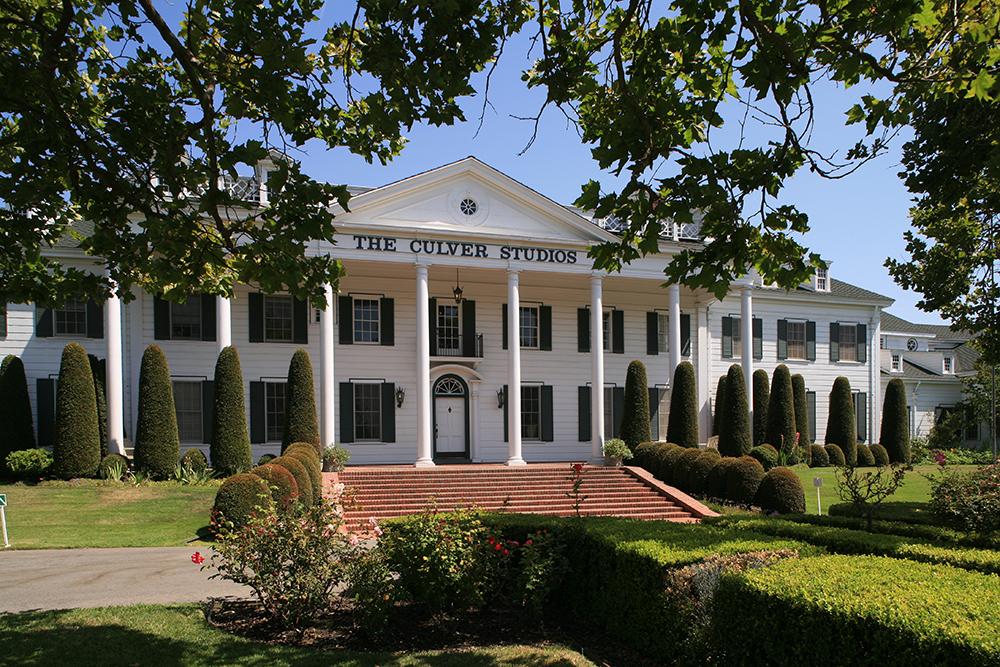
Mansion House in 2013

The picturesque mansion house is the centerpiece of the Culver Studios lot and has landmark status. It is a classic example of 1920s Colonial Revival architecture and was the first building to go up on the site shortly after Thomas H. Ince's acquisition of the land in 1918. Modeled after George Washington's home at Mount Vernon, Virginia, it serves as the main administrative building on the lot. Famous producers including Ince, Cecil B. DeMille, and David O. Selznick once had offices there.

One long corridor runs the length of the 15,000 square foot structure, which has eight two-story high grand white columns. The facade looks out onto a manicured lawn.

There is a common misconception that the mansion house was used as the site of Tara, the home of Scarlett O'Hara in Gone With the Wind. The building was seen in the film credits but Tara was a separate building constructed on the Forty Acres backlot by art director Lyle Wheeler, where the scene depicting the burning of Atlanta was filmed.

=== Bungalows ===
At the southern end of Culver Studios sat a collection of four bungalows, dating back to the 1920s and 1930s. They were occupied by a host of celebrated writers and actors over the years and are now considered locally significant structures.

Alfred Hitchcock used one of the one-story buildings as his office for years. Another bungalow was built in 1935 and used as a residential space for Clark Gable and Vivien Leigh during filming of Gone With the Wind. Other bungalows have been connected to Olivia de Havilland, Lucille Ball, Gloria Swanson and Orson Welles.

As part of the expansion project undertaken by Hackman Capital Partners, the bungalows were moved to the front of the lot, behind the mansion house. They are used as production spaces and offices for writers, producers, production staff, and talent.

=== Cecil B. DeMille Theater ===
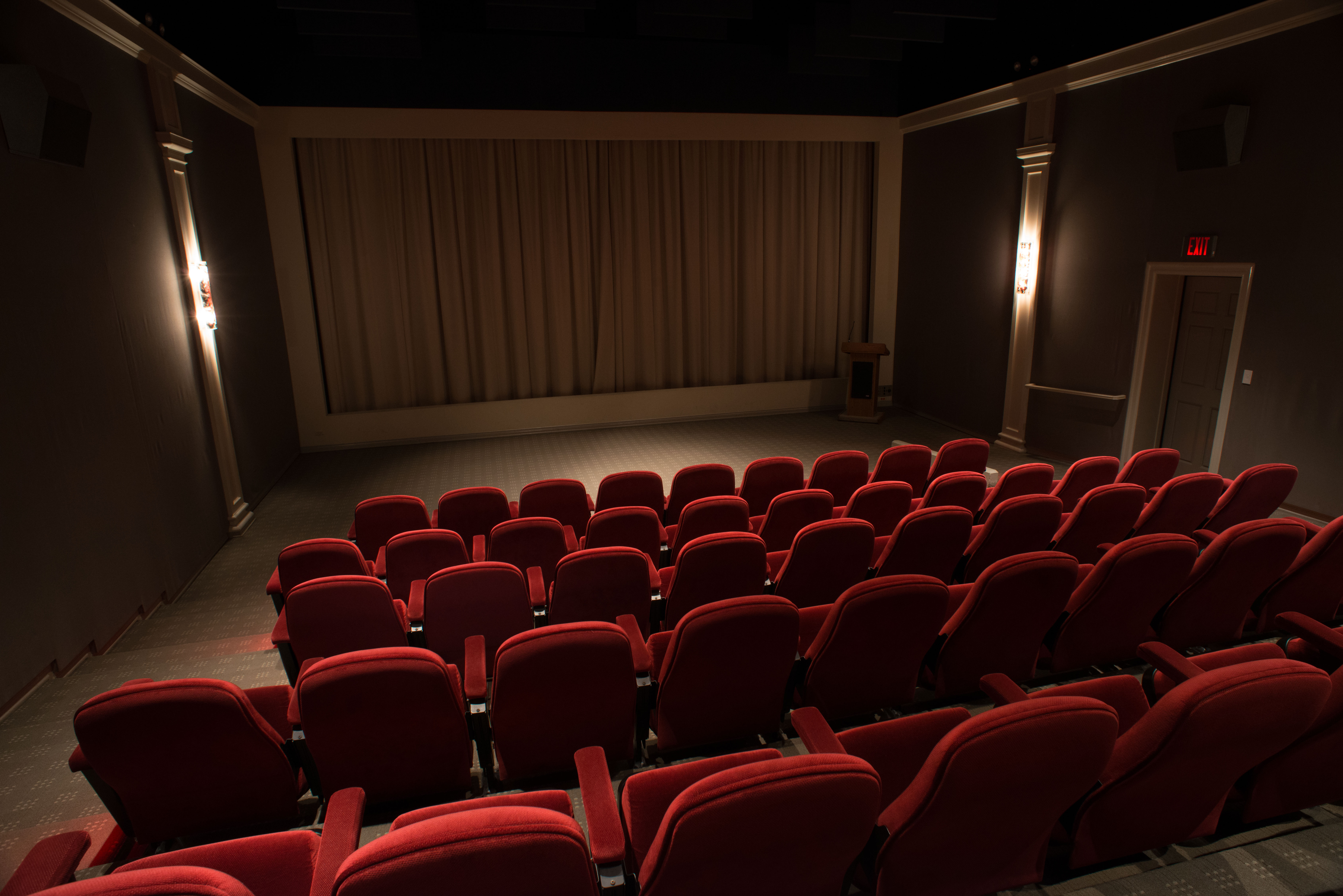
Known as the Cecil B. DeMille Theater, it served as the executive screening room during Hollywood's heyday when each movie studio had its own stable of stars

Built by producer Cecil B. DeMille in 1927 when he owned the studio, the theater is adjacent to the mansion house. It was dedicated to DeMille in 1984 and available for special screenings, fundraisers, and production daily viewings.

The theater has 70 seats, a 24 ft x 11 ft screen, and digital and 35mm projectors.

=== Back Forty ===
As the Culver Studios grew in size and stature, a 28.5-acre (11.5 ha) backlot was used to build full-scale outdoor sets. The Back Forty, also known as Forty Acres, sat on a triangular plot of land a few blocks from the main lot.

It was initially leased from landowner Harry Culver during Cecil B. DeMille's tenure and was continuously used to build the plantation Tara, the Atlanta Depot, and other Atlanta buildings in Gone With the Wind.

The Back Forty also provided the backdrop for several television shows broadcast during the 1960s, including Hogan's Heroes, The Andy Griffith Show, Star Trek, and Bonanza.

The land is no longer connected to the Culver Studios and currently serves as an office park.

== Productions ==
Culver Studios helped spawn the career of numerous movie and television stars. In the lot's earlier days, the site was used to film Hollywood classics like Hitchcock's Spellbound (1945) before a plethora of television shows began to lease the stages in the 1950s to create programs like The Andy Griffith Show and Hogan's Heroes.

In more recent decades, the site has again become the setting for movies including The Matrix, Armageddon, and I Am Legend while providing a home to popular television shows such as Arrested Development and Cougar Town.

In 1992, Michael Jackson used the Stage to rehearse for his upcoming Dangerous World Tour (1992–1993).

=== Selected films ===
- 1933: King Kong (scene on Skull Island)
- 1937: A Star Is Born
- 1939: Gone with the Wind
- 1940: Rebecca
- 1944: Since You Went Away
- 1945: Spellbound
- 1946: Duel in the Sun
- 1975 Lepke
- 1976: Carrie
- 1976: Rocky
- 1978: Sgt. Pepper's Lonely Hearts Club Band
- 1979: The Jerk
- 1980: Raging Bull
- 1980: Airplane!
- 1982: E.T. the Extra-Terrestrial
- 1983: The Man with Two Brains
- 1985: Prizzi's Honor
- 1986: Three Amigos
- 1987: RoboCop
- 1987: Planes, Trains and Automobiles
- 1988: Beetlejuice
- 1988: Child's Play
- 1991: Bugsy
- 1991: Hook
- 1992: A Few Good Men
- 1995: Crimson Tide
- 1995: Nixon
- 1997: Air Force One
- 1997: Red Corner
- 1997: Contact
- 1998: Armageddon
- 1999: The Matrix
- 1997: Wag the Dog
- 2000: What Women Want
- 2001: Legally Blonde
- 2002: Kill Bill
- 2004: 50 First Dates
- 2003: Peter Pan
- 2004: Bewitched
- 2004: Christmas with the Kranks
- 2005: Yours, Mine & Ours
- 2006: Night at the Museum
- 2007: I Am Legend
- 2008: Valkyrie
- 2009: State of Play
- 2009: G-Force
- 2010: Alice in Wonderland
- 2011: X-Men: First Class
- 2012: The Campaign
- 2012: Argo (reshoots)
- 2015: All The Way

=== Selected TV ===
- 1952: Adventures of Superman (black-and-white episodes only)
- 1959: The Untouchables
- 1960: The Andy Griffith Show
- 1964–1965: Star Trek (two pilots only)
- 1965: Hogan's Heroes
- 1965: I Spy [studio interiors]
- 1966: Batman
- 1967: He & She (pilot episode)
- 1986: Pee-wee's Playhouse
- 1987: Beauty and the Beast
- 1989: Baywatch
- 1992: Mad About You
- 1993: The Nanny
- 1998: The King of Queens
- 2003: Arrested Development
- 2003: Las Vegas
- 2005: Deal or No Deal
- 2003: America's Next Top Model
- 2008: The Bonnie Hunt Show
- 2009: Scrubs (season 9 only)
- 2009: Cougar Town
- 2008: Giada at Home
- 2011: Ringer
- 2012: The New Ricki Lake Show
- 2012: Arrested Development
- 2013: Comedy Central's James Franco Roast
- 2013: Kris
- 2011: Episodes
- 2015: FABLife
- 2016: Big Little Lies
- 2017: The Last Ship
- 2017: Arrested Development
- 2021: Judy Justice
- 2025: Studio coverage for the NBA on Prime Video
