= Stalag 13 (film set) =

Outdoor film set built in 1964

- Location: RKO Forty Acres, Culver City, California, U.S.
- Built: 1964
- Built for: Film set
- Demolished: 1974

Stalag 13 was an outdoor film set, built in 1964 near the northwest corner of RKO Forty Acres in Culver City. It was used to depict various prison camps, most famously the POW camp of Hogan's Heroes. In early 1968 it also hosted a Mission: Impossible crew. Often the camera faced the front gates from inside the compound near the commandant's office to show the passage of guest characters; such scenes looked northeast to a tree-covered berm beyond which utility poles along Higuera Street were visible.

In 1974, Stalag 13 became the outdoor location in Ilsa: She-Wolf of the SS. Set demolition began while that movie was photographed; by summer 1974 all traces of the "camp" were gone and a new set was erected for The Fortune.
