= John Megna =

American actor (1952–1995)

- Megna in the Star Trek: The Original Series episode "Miri" (1966)
- Born: John Anthony Megna; November 9, 1952; Queens, New York, U.S.
- Died: September 5, 1995 (aged 42); Los Angeles, California, U.S.
- Occupations: Actor; director; teacher
- Years active: 1959–1984
- Known for: To Kill a Mockingbird
- Relatives: Connie Stevens (half-sister)

John Anthony Megna (November 9, 1952 – September 5, 1995) was an American actor, director and teacher. His best-known role is that of Dill in the film To Kill a Mockingbird (1962).

== Early life ==
John Anthony Megna was born in Ozone Park, Queens, New York, to Ralph W. Megna, a pharmacist, and Eleanor McGinley, a one-time nightclub singer. He was a half-brother of Connie Stevens through their mother, and an ex-brother-in-law of Eddie Fisher, both famous singers. He attended Holy Cross High School in Flushing, Queens.

== Career ==
At age 6, Megna made his acting debut in Frank Loesser's Broadway musical Greenwillow. At 7, he starred in All the Way Home, an adaptation of James Agee's novel about the effect of a father's death on his family. This led to his being cast as Charles Baker "Dill" Harris in the 1962 film To Kill a Mockingbird. The character was based on writer Truman Capote, a childhood friend and later associate of Harper Lee, the author of the original novel.

Megna appeared in many television programs throughout the 1960s and 1970s; he portrayed a near-blind child in the Naked City episode "A Horse Has a Big Head - Let Him Worry!", one of the "Onlies" in the Star Trek: The Original Series episode "Miri", Stephan in I Spy (1967), and Little Adam in the NASA-produced animated shorts The Big World of Little Adam.

His other film appearances include Hush...Hush, Sweet Charlotte (1964), The Godfather: Part II (1974), The Boy in the Plastic Bubble (1976) with John Travolta, and Go Tell the Spartans (1978) with Burt Lancaster. He also acted in two films starring Burt Reynolds and directed by Hal Needham: Smokey and the Bandit II (1980) and The Cannonball Run (1981).

== Later career ==
Megna graduated from Cornell University as a performing arts major.

As an adult, he turned to directing plays. He was the founding director of L.A. Arts, a nonprofit theater group in Los Angeles. He later became a high school English, Spanish, and history teacher, and he last taught at James Monroe High School in North Hills, California. He also taught Honors English at Hollenbeck Junior High in Boyle Heights.

== Personal life and death ==
Megna was openly gay. He died from AIDS-related complications on September 5, 1995, at Midway Hospital in Los Angeles, at the age of 42.

== Television ==
- Naked City (1962) (Season 4 Episode 10: "A Horse Has a Big Head - Let Him Worry!") - Harold Denton
- The Alfred Hitchcock Hour (1964) (Season 2 Episode 13: "The Magic Shop") - Richard Anthony 'Tony' Grainger
- Star Trek: The Original Series (1966) (Season 1 Episode 8: "Miri") - Little Boy
- Police Woman (1975) (Season 2 Episode 2: "The Score") - Hooper
- Police Woman (1977) (Season 3 Episode 13: "Night of the Full Moon") - Stan
- Police Woman (1977) (Season 4 Episode 5: "Screams") - Jackson
- Police Woman (1977) (Season 4 Episode 8: "Death Game") - Punk Leader
- Skag (1980) (Pilot Episode)
- The Mogul (1984)

== Filmography ==
- To Kill a Mockingbird (1962) - Dill Harris
- Hush… Hush, Sweet Charlotte (1964) - New Boy
- Blindfold (1966) - Mario Vincenti
- The Godfather Part II (1974) - Young Hyman Roth (uncredited)
- The Boy in the Plastic Bubble (1976) (TV Movie) - Smith
- I Want to Keep My Baby (1976) (TV Movie) - Andy
- Another Man, Another Chance (1977) - Loser in Saloon (uncredited)
- Go Tell the Spartans (1978) - Corporal Ackley
- Sunnyside (1979) - B.B.
- Butch and Sundance: The Early Days (1979) - Outlaw
- Smokey and the Bandit II (1980) - P.T.
- The Cannonball Run (1981) - Arthur Rose
- The Ratings Game (1984) - Al
