= Mazuca haemagrapha =

Scientific classification
- Kingdom: Animalia
- Phylum: Arthropoda
- Class: Insecta
- Order: Lepidoptera
- Superfamily: Noctuoidea
- Family: Noctuidae
- Genus: Mazuca
- Species: M. haemagrapha

Binomial name
- Mazuca haemagrapha Hampson, 1910

Species of moth

Mazuca haemagrapha is a species of moth in the family Noctuidae, described by Sir George Francis Hampson, 10th Baronet in 1910.

Mazuca haemagrapha is found in Ghana, Gabon, and Equatorial Guinea.
