= Canasta =

Card game

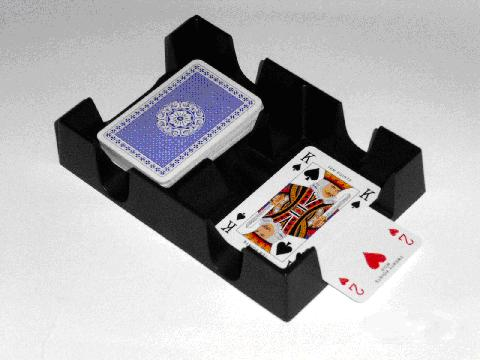
- Origin: Uruguay
- Type: Matching
- Players: 2–4
- Skills: Tactics and strategy
- Age range: 11 and up
- Cards: 108 cards
- Deck: French
- Rank (high→low): Red-3 Joker 2 A K Q J 10 9 8 7 6 5 4 Black-3
- Play: Clockwise
- Playing time: 60 minutes (1 hour)
- Chance: Medium

Related games
- Buraco • Biriba

Canasta (/kəˈnæstə/; Spanish for "basket") is a card game of the rummy family of games believed to be a variant of 500 rum. Although many variations exist for two, three, five or six players, it is most commonly played by four in two partnerships with two standard decks of cards. Players attempt to make melds of seven cards of the same rank and "go out" by playing all cards in their hands.

== History ==
The game of Canasta was devised by attorney Segundo Sánchez Santos and his Bridge partner, architect Alberto Serrato in Montevideo, Uruguay, in 1939, in an attempt to design a time-efficient game that was as engaging as Bridge. They tried different formulas before combining Bridge, Rummy and Conquan into a game, and then inviting Arturo Gómez Hartley and Ricardo Sanguinetti to test their game.

After a positive reception of Canasta at their local bridge club, the Jockey Club, in the 1940s the game quickly spread north throughout South America in myriad variations to Chile, Peru, Brazil and Argentina, where its rules were further refined. It was introduced to the United States in 1949 by Josefina Artayeta de Viel (New York), where it was then referred to as the Argentine Rummy game by Ottilie H. Reilly in 1949 and Michael Scully of Coronet magazine in 1953. In 1949/51 the New York Regency Club wrote the Official Canasta Laws, which were published together with game experts from South America by the National Canasta Laws Commissions of the US and Argentina.

Canasta became rapidly popular in the United States in the 1950s with many card sets, card trays and books being produced. Interest in the game began to wane there during the 1960s, but the game still enjoys some popularity today, with Canasta leagues and clubs still existing in several parts of the United States.

The name canasta likely is named for the tray (basket) originally placed in the center of the table for the stack of undealt cards and discards. The game was also called Samba and Bolivia. Santos and Serrato did not attempt to trademark the game name or sell Canasta decks, and thus never received royalties from the later Canasta boom.

Canasta is "the most recent card game to have achieved worldwide status as a classic".

== Rules for classic Canasta ==
=== Cards and deal ===
The classic game is for four players in two partnerships of two. Variations exist for two and three player games wherein each plays alone, and also for a six-player game in two partnerships of three. If partners are chosen, they must sit opposite each other. Canasta usually uses two complete decks of 52 French-suited playing cards with two or three Jokers per deck, making a total of 108 or 110 cards. (The number of Jokers varies depending on the deck.)

Card functions
Card	Value
4, 5, 6, 7, 8, 9, 10, J, Q, K, A	Natural melding cards
Deuce (2), Joker	Wild melding cards
Red Trey (3)	Bonus points
Black Trey (3)	Safe discard (may be melded when going out)

The initial dealer is chosen by any common method, although in Canasta there is no privilege or advantage to being the dealer. The deal then rotates clockwise after every hand. The dealer shuffles the pack, the player to the dealer's right cuts, and the dealer deals out a hand of 11 cards to each player. The remaining cards are left in a stack in the center of the table. One card is taken from the top of the stack and placed face up to start the discard pile. If that card is wild or a red three, the card is rotated 90 degrees and another card is turned and placed on top of it. That continues until a natural card or a black three is turned up. The rotating of the wild card freezes the deck (see picking up the discard pile, below).

  1. * If a player was dealt red threes, they must instantly play them face up in front of them and draw the same number of replacement cards.

=== Play ===
The player to the dealer's left has the first turn, and then play proceeds clockwise. A turn begins either by drawing the first card from the stock into the player's hand or by picking up the entire discard pile. However, there are restrictions on when one can pick up the discard pile. (See Picking up the discard pile, below). If the card drawn from the stock is a red three, the player must table it immediately, as one would if melding, and draw another card.

Players may then make as many legal melds as they wish from the cards in their hands. A turn ends when the player discards one card from the hand to the top of the discard pile. No player may "undo" a meld or laid card, or change their mind after drawing a card from the deck.

==== Melds and canastas ====
Each player/team keeps separate melds of the various ranks of cards. A player may never play to an opponent's meld. A legal meld consists of at least three cards of the same rank, and there is no limit on how large it can grow. Suits are irrelevant except that black threes are treated differently from red threes. Wild cards can be used as any rank except for threes. Threes may never be melded in ordinary play, although three or more black threes may be melded in the final turn of a player going out.

A meld must consist of at least two natural cards, and can never have more than three wild cards. Examples: 5♥ 5♣ 2♥ and 9♥ 9♣ 9♠ 2♣ Jkr are legal melds. 5♥ 2♣ 2♥ is not a legal meld; it contains only one natural card. 9♥ 9♣ 9♦ 2♥ 2♣ 2♦ Jkr is not legal; it contains more than three wild cards. One team/player cannot have two separate melds of the same rank. If more cards of the same rank are melded, they are automatically merged into the preexisting meld.

A canasta is a meld of at least seven cards, whether natural or mixed. A natural canasta is one that comprises only cards of the same rank. A mixed canasta (or; dirty, unnatural, or black canasta) is one that comprises both natural and wild cards. Once a canasta is assembled, the cards are stacked, or "squared," up, and one of the natural cards forming it is placed on top – a red one to indicate a natural canasta or a black one to indicate a mixed canasta.

==== Initial melds ====
Each card has a specific value that determines both the score and the minimum points players need before laying down their first melds:

Point values towards minimum meld
Card	Value
4, 5, 6, 7	5
8, 9, 10, J, Q, K	10
2, A	20
Joker	50

During each hand the first time a team lays cards on the table, the cards of the combined melds must equal a minimum meld requirement based on the values of each of the cards. At the beginning of a game, both teams have an initial meld requirement of 50 points. The count towards the requirement cannot include the value of any cards a player could possibly pick up within the discard pile except for the exposed top card of that discard pile. If the combined value does not meet the minimum requirement, they cannot play the cards on the table nor pick up the discard pile. After the first hand, the minimum meld requirement for subsequent hands is based on that team's accumulated score before the hand starts.

Team score	Minimum initial meld
Negative	15
0–1495	50
1500–2995	90
3000 and above	120

Example: If a player/team has a score of 1,600 and has not yet made any melds in a hand, an initial meld of 7♣ 7♦ 7♥, Q♣ Q♦ Q♥ 2♦ cannot be made. It scores only 65 points and the requirement is 90. A meld of 7♣ 7♦ 7♥, A♣ A♦ A♥ 2♦ would score 95 points and can be played. Note that both initial melds can be played if the team's total score is below 1500, and that neither can be played if the team's total score is 3000 or higher. The minimum meld requirement for a team which has a negative score is 15. Because any three cards are always worth at least 15 points, it effectively means any meld is sufficient for laying down the first meld(s). Once a teammate has laid down cards on the table to meet the team's minimum opening meld, the partner at their turn is free to meld whatever cards are legally allowed.

==== Picking up the discard pile ====
The discard pile should be kept squared up, so only the top card is visible. A player cannot look through the discard pile.

At the beginning of the turn, a player may pick up the entire discard pile instead of drawing a card from the stock. They may only pick up the discard pile if they can use the top card, either in an existing meld or by making a new meld along with at least two other cards from the hand (which can include wild cards). Only the top card is relevant for the player/team to pick up the rest of the discard pile. In addition, if the player/team has not yet melded, they must meet the initial meld requirement using the top card of the discard pile in order to pick up the pile. In this case the points of the top card are included to meet the initial meld requirement.

Discarding a wild card freezes the pile. The card should be placed at right angles to the pile, so that it is still visible to indicate a frozen pile after more cards have been discarded. A frozen pile may only be picked up (unfrozen) if a player can meld the top card with two natural cards of the same rank from the player's hand.

If a wild card or a black three is on top of the discard pile, it may not be picked up. Playing a black three does not freeze the pile; it just acts as a stop card, preventing the other player from picking up the pile. The card discarded after a black three allows the pile to be picked up again (unless it is a wild card or another black three).

The discard pile is also frozen against a player/team that has not yet melded at all this hand, though at the same time it will not be frozen for another player/team that has melded.

==== Going out and ending a hand ====
A player may go out by using all the cards in hand only if that player/team has made at least one canasta. The player goes out by melding all his or her cards and may discard a single final card if necessary. It is not required to discard a card in the process of legally going out. If the player/team has not yet made any canastas, players on that team may not make a play which would leave them with no cards in the hand at the end of the turn. If a player can legally go out, but has three or more black threes in the hand, these may be melded at this time only. The hand ends immediately when any player goes out. Going out earns a bonus of 100 points.If a player goes out on their first turn, it is called "shooting the moon" and they automatically win the game.

When considering going out, a player may ask the partner for permission to go out. It is not required to ask partner's permission, but if done the player must abide by the partner's answer. If the partner refuses permission, the player may not go out this turn. If the partner responds "yes", the player must go out this turn.

If a player melds the whole hand in one turn (including at least one canasta) without previously melding, they earn an extra 100 points for going out concealed, making it 200 points. To earn the bonus, a player cannot add cards to the partner's melds. It is allowed to go out concealed while picking up the discard pile. The relevant initial meld requirement must be met.

A hand can also be ended by exhausting the stock. Play can continue with no stock as long as players are able take the previous player's discard and meld it. In such a situation a player must take the discard if able to do so. As soon as a player cannot legally take the card, the hand ends. If a player draws a red three as the last card from the stock, it is counted towards that player's score, but the hand ends immediately since there is no replacement card to be taken. The player is not allowed to meld nor discard after picking up the red three in this case.

=== Scoring ===
At the end of each hand, the score for each team is calculated as follows:

The total value of all cards melded by that player/team, including cards in canastas minus the total value of all cards remaining in the player's/team's hands, plus any bonuses:

Card	Value counted against if in hand at end of game
Red 3	500
Black 3, 4, 5, 6, 7	5
8, 9, 10, J, Q, K	10
2, A	20
Joker	50

Bonus points
Bonus	Value
For going out	100
For going out concealed	an extra 100 (200 total for going out)
For each mixed canasta	300
For each natural canasta	500
For red threes	100 points each (200 points each if you have all four )

==== Penalties ====
If a player/team has collected red threes, but has not yet made the initial melds when the opposition goes out, then the bonus value of red threes counts against them (it is subtracted from the score along with the rest of the cards in their hands). If they collected all four red threes, 800 points are deducted from their score.

100 point penalty if you ask permission from your partner to go out, and then being unable to do so. 50 point penalty for taking the upcard on the discard pile and then being unable to use it legally

It is possible to have a negative total score. The game ends when a player/team's total score reaches 5000. If both players/teams reach 5000 at the end of a hand, whoever has the higher score, wins the game. The margin of victory is the difference in points.

== Variations ==
=== Canasta for two or three players ===
Canasta can be played with fewer than four players with some variations in the rules. The most significant changes are in the number of cards dealt at the beginning of the hand and the fact that each person plays individually. In a game with three players, each player receives 13 cards. In a two-player game each player receives 15 cards and each player draws two cards on each of their turns and discards one. If each player draws two cards, there is usually the additional requirement that a player must have made two canastas in order to go out.

=== Modern American Canasta ===
Modern American Canasta is the variation most commonly played in social clubs and tournaments in the United States and Canada. It is a partnership game for four players in two fixed teams, with partners seated opposite one another, played with two standard 52-card decks plus four jokers, for a total of 108 cards. Thirteen cards are dealt to each player, and the first side to reach 8,500 points wins the match. Points are accumulated through melds (sets of three or more cards of the same rank), through canastas (melds of exactly seven cards), and through occasional "special hands" worth large fixed bonuses.

Twos and jokers serve as wild cards. Threes follow their own rules: a player dealt or drawing a three places it face-up immediately and draws a replacement, and threes are never melded or discarded during play. Sevens may only be melded as a pure canasta of seven sevens with no wilds, and aces may include wilds only in a team's initial meld, and once the team has opened, all subsequent ace melds must also be pure. The initial meld a team puts down must satisfy a minimum point requirement that scales with that team's running score: 125 points below 3,000, 155 points between 3,000 and 5,000, and 180 points above 5,000. The opening meld must include at least one natural meld of three or more cards, and no meld may contain more than two wild cards. As a reward for opening, the first team to do so takes four extra cards from the stock (the "Talon") and the second team to open takes three; the Talon is forfeited if a team opens by taking the discard pile. The discard pile may be claimed only by a player who already holds at least two natural cards matching the top discard, and never by means of a wild card; the top card and the two matching naturals must be melded immediately, after which the rest of the pile is added to the player's hand. A team may not take the pile if doing so would create a meld of more than seven cards in a rank, or if any team has already completed a canasta in that rank.

Each canasta may be either "pure" (seven natural cards) or "mixed" (five or six naturals plus one or two wilds), and a team must have completed at least two canastas before any of its players may go out. A player intending to go out must still make a legal discard on the final turn. Bonuses include 500 points for a pure canasta, 300 for a mixed canasta, 2,500 for a natural canasta of sevens or aces, 3,000 for a canasta of twos with no jokers, 2,000 for a wild-card canasta of twos and jokers, and 100 for going out. Threes held at the end of a hand are scored separately and act as a penalty, neutrally, or as a bonus depending on whether the team has completed zero, one, or two or more canastas. A "special hand" is a 14-card combination, such as the Pairs Hand (seven different pairs) or the so-called Zip Code (one four-of-a-kind, two three-of-a-kinds, and two pairs), that is laid down in full on a single turn, immediately ending the round and earning a fixed bonus of around 2,000 to 2,500 points in place of any other meld scoring for that team.

The Canasta League of America, founded in 2011, has been focused on standardizing the most common rules played in North America.

=== Samba ===
Samba is a variant of Canasta, played with three decks, including jokers, for a total of 162 cards. 15 cards are dealt to each of four players, and an additional card is turned up. Two cards are drawn each turn, so the pace is quicker than traditional Canasta. The game is to 10,000 points instead of 5,000. Samba allows sequence melds of three or more (for example, the 4, 5, and 6 of hearts or the Queen, King and Ace of Spades). If a player is able to make a sequence of seven (for example, the 5 through J of diamonds), this is a samba and is worth 1,500 points. Rather than four red threes being worth 800 points, six red threes are worth 1,000 points. Two wild cards is the maximum allowed for a meld. The minimum initial meld is 150 if a partnership has 7,000 or more.

=== Bolivian Canasta ===
Bolivian Canasta is similar to Samba, as it uses three decks and sequence melds. Play is to 15,000. Wild card canastas (bolivias) count 2,500. A side must have a samba (called escalera in this game) and at least one other canasta to go out. Red threes only count positive if two or more canastas have been melded. Black threes are negative 100 instead of negative 5 when left in hand.

=== Brazilian Canasta ===
Similar to Bolivia, but only to 10,000. The minimum meld requirements are 150 from 5,000 to 7,000; a canasta from 7,000 to 8,000; 200 from 8,000 to 9,000; and a natural canasta from 9,000 up. Wild card canastas count 2,000. Partnerships receive 1,000 for five red threes and 1,200 for all six. If a side has a sequence of five cards or less, it loses 1,000.

=== British Canasta ===
Similar to the original rules but with the important addition of 'Acaba' (Spanish for 'The End'). A player may say this at any point during their turn and will immediately forfeit the round awarding the opposing player or team 1,500 points and receiving 0 points, ending the very dull phase where one player or team has total control over the discard deck. When playing in teams a player may ask their teammate for permission to say acaba just as they may ask before going out and they will also be bound by the response in the same way.

=== Chilean Canasta ===
Allows both sambas and bolivias. Can be played with either three decks (162 cards) or four decks (216 cards).

=== Cuban Canasta ===
A two-deck variant to 7,500. Requires 150 for an initial meld if a partnership is over 5,000. The deck is always frozen. Wild card canastas are worth between 2,000 and 4,000; depending on the number of deuces. Threes are scored only if canastas are made; they count 100 for one, 300 for two, 500 for three and 1,000 for four. Black threes are removed from play if a discard pile is taken; a partnership that removes all four black threes this way gets 100 points.

=== Italian Canasta ===
Italian canasta is a Samba variant. The number of cards in the discard pile at the beginning of the game varies with the initial card turned up. The discard pile is always frozen. Deuces may, but a partnership may not play deuces as wild cards if deuces have been melded and a canasta is incomplete. Game is to 15,000

=== Uruguayan Canasta ===
It is exactly like the original canasta, in its original version.

=== Boat Canasta ===
This variation originates in Slovakia. Since the definition of Canasta rules differed from player to player a strong urge has risen for unified rules. This in turn was satisfied by the creation of Boat Canasta, which really is a mix of other known rules, but thoroughly optimized. Currently this variant of Canasta is steadily gaining popularity mainly in Slovakia, but also in countries such as France, Germany and England.

=== Hand and Foot Canasta ===
This version is a quad deck game that is played with a hand and a foot, unlike traditional canasta that just has a hand. Hand and Foot is a Canasta variant involving four to seven decks and is played by teams of two players (usually two teams, but it also works with three or four teams). The number of decks used is typically one more than the number of players, though this can vary. Due to the larger pool of available cards, it is much easier to form canastas in Hand and Foot than in standard Canasta, which changes the strategy considerably. Some players feel this version is more enjoyable for beginners. The variant was born in the 1970s; commercial decks to play Hand and Foot have been available since 1987. Important rule changes for this variant include:

- Each player is dealt two piles of 11 cards, which will be referred to as the "hand" and the "foot". The hand is picked up normally, while the foot remains face down until the hand is exhausted.
- A player who melds all cards from the original hand picks up the foot as a new hand and continues playing. A player who exhausts the original hand by discarding picks up the foot as a new hand, but does not play from it until the next turn.
- On each turn, players draw two cards from the stock. Each player discards one card on each turn.
- The number of canastas required to go out are three red (natural or clean, i.e. no wild cards) and four black (mixed or dirty, i.e. with wild cards) canastas. When playing a singles game (that is, without partners), the requirement is one red canasta and two black canastas.
- Discards may be picked up with a natural pair, but a player must take the top five cards from the discard pile.
- Threes may not be melded; so, since the only way to get rid of them is by discarding them one at a time, the number of threes in a player's hand represents a minimum number of turns before a player could possibly go out.
- Black threes (in a player's hand or foot) score five points, red threes are scored as negative 300 points.

==== Initial melds ====
At the beginning of a game, both teams have an initial meld requirement of 50. The requirement increases in value in subsequent hands.

Hand	Minimum initial meld
1st hand	50
2nd hand	90
3rd hand	120
4th hand	150

- Rules for going out are:
  - A player must have a minimum of three red (no wild cards) and 4 black canastas.
  - A player asks their partner for permission to go out.

==== The scoring ====
At the end of each hand, the score for each team is calculated as follows:

The total value of all cards melded by that player/team, including cards in canastas minus the total value of all cards remaining in the team's hands, plus any bonuses:

Bonus scores
Going out	100
Each mixed (black, dirty) canasta	300
Each natural (red, clean) canasta	500

Point values are:

Point values for cards in Canasta
Card	Value
4, 5, 6, 7	5
8, 9, 10, J, Q, K	10
2 (Wild), A	20
Joker (Wild)	50

=== Miscellaneous variations for Classic Canasta and other types ===
- The discard pile is blocked for canastas. Only non-canasta melds can be used to pick up the discard pile.
- The number of wildcards in a meld must always be less than the number of natural cards.
- Card points inside canastas are counted as well as the canasta score.
- Real jokers can not be discarded and thus can not be used to block the discard pile
- The initial meld must be done before the discard pile can be taken, so the points of 2 natural cards together with the discard top card are not added to the initial meld requirement score.
- There is a special case where any player/team that manages to meld 7 canastas in one hand (natural or mixed) automatically gain 5000 points and thus win the game.
- A number of cards other than 11 may be dealt at the beginning of the game, 13 and 15 being common choices. Some groups vary the number of cards drawn inversely with the number of players.
- To make picking up the discard pile more challenging, require that a natural pair be played on the same turn that the pile is picked up.
- A concealed canasta occurs when a canasta is melded directly from a player's hand. Usually in also going out: going out concealed which earns an extra 100 point bonus over the standard 100 point going out bonus.
- One variant allows melding up to three wild cards in a meld, regardless of the number of natural cards melded.
- When the stock is depleted, consider flipping over the discard pile and turning it into a new stock to extend play.
- Another variation is to only take 10 cards after taking the discard pile. This allows for the game to be much more balanced the further you get into a round.

== See also ==
- Rummy
- Desmoche
- Mille (card game)
- Continental (card game)

== Bibliography ==
- Silbertein, Sue/Alan and Jackson-Strage, Jennifer, Ultimate Guide to Modern Canasta (2nd. Edition), Master Point Press 2025
- Culbertson, Ely, Culbertson on Canasta: a Complete Guide for Beginners and Advanced Players With the Official Laws of Canasta, Faber 1949
- Holmberg, H.H. and Öhrling, Erkki, Canasta, Samba ja Sitoumussamba, 1962
- Morehead, Albert, Hoyle's Rules of Games (Third edition), Signet, 2001
- Parlett, David (2008). The Penguin Book of Card Games. London: Penguin.
- Scarne, John, Scarne's Encyclopedia of Card Games, 2001
- Collins, Dara and Miller-Small, Donna, Modern American Canasta: The Complete Guide, 2023
