= RKO Forty Acres =

Studio backlot in California (1927–1976)

- 1965 aerial photo of the property, looking west. Desilu Studios can be seen in the background.
- Interactive map of the RKO Forty Acres area

General information
- Type: Film backlot
- Location: Culver City, California, U.S.
- Coordinates: 34.022°N 118.382°W
- Opening: 1927
- Demolished: 1976

Technical details
- Size: 28.5 acres (11.5 ha)
Studios in charge
Cecil B. DeMille (leased from Harry Culver)	1927
RKO Pathé	1928–1948
Selznick International Pictures (leased from RKO)	1935–1939
RKO (under Howard Hughes)	1948–1955
RKO General (under General Tire & Rubber Co.)	1955–1957
Desilu	1957–1966
Paramount	1967
Perfect Film and Chemical	1968
OSF Industries Limited	1969–1976

RKO Forty Acres was a film studio backlot in Culver City, California. Its owners included RKO Pictures, Desilu Productions, and Paramount Pictures. Best known as Forty Acres and "the back forty", it was also called "Desilu Culver", the "RKO backlot", and "Pathé 40 Acre Ranch", depending on which studio owned the property at the time. For nearly 50 years it was known for its outdoor full-scale sets, such as Western Street, Atlanta Street, and Main Street and was used in many films (including King Kong (1933) and Gone with the Wind (1939)) and television series (such as Bonanza and Star Trek).

The property was never actually forty acres in size. It was a triangular parcel of 28.5 acres (11.5 ha), a few blocks from RKO-Pathé (later Selznick, Desilu-Culver, now "The Culver Studios") which was situated to the west. It was bounded by Higuera Street to the north, West Jefferson Boulevard, Ballona Creek and Culver City Park to the south, and Lucerne Avenue to the west. In 1976, it was razed for redevelopment. Today it is known as the southern expansion of the Hayden Industrial Tract. A number of the buildings in the industrial park have been converted to television studios. One of the shows produced at the park is Hell's Kitchen.

== History ==
On 22 March 1926, Cecil B. DeMille leased the 28 1/2 acre property, on which the backlot was located, from Achille Casserini, a Swiss immigrant, for his production of the film The King of Kings (1927). On it he constructed historical Jerusalem, which remained for the RKO production of King Kong (1933). By then it was known as Forty Acres and owned by RKO Pictures.

In 1935, David O. Selznick leased the property from RKO for his new studio, Selznick International Pictures. For his production of Gone with the Wind (1939), the plantation Tara, the Atlanta Depot (based on Atlanta's 1853 Union Station), and other Atlanta buildings were constructed there.

The depot and many of the Atlanta buildings became permanent fixtures on the property until its final days, while the set of Tara was sold in 1959 to investors who planned to open a theme park in the Atlanta area (see Tara (plantation)).

From 1943 to 1958, a separate part of the 28.5 acres (11.5 ha) known as the African jungle set, located on the opposite side of Ballona Creek, was used extensively for the Tarzan series by RKO, and later for The Adventures of Jim Bowie television series by Desilu.

Following years of turnover by several owners, including Howard Hughes, the backlot was practically deserted and cinematic productions declined. It was purchased in 1957 by Desilu with the intention of filming for the burgeoning television industry.

== Television ==
Forty Acres is best remembered for providing the backdrop for the fictional town of Mayberry on the television series The Andy Griffith Show. Many of the street scenes and buildings on the backlot were seen regularly on television screens across America and became quite familiar to viewers. The original Town of Atlanta set, comprising a New York style street, a town square and a residential area to the east, was situated in the center of the property and used on shows like Adventures of Superman, Ozzie and Harriet, Batman, The Green Hornet, and Mission: Impossible. The town square was also used on Star Trek in three episodes titled "Miri", "Return of the Archons" and "City on the Edge of Forever", while another area of the lot, the "Arab village", was used in "Errand of Mercy" and the first pilot, "The Cage". Sharp-eyed television viewers could note many visual cues that crossed over from one series to the next, including the structures themselves or signs on doors and windows. For example, in Star Trek's "The City on the Edge of Forever", a crossover from The Andy Griffith Show can be seen by a sign for "Floyd's Barber Shop".

Forty Acres was also the backdrop for an episode of My Three Sons entitled "The Horseless Saddle" (1961), and five episodes of the TV series Bonanza where the backlot's Western Street, next to the Garden of Allah (1936) set, served as a trail town. An added feature was the fact that some portions of the backlot were occupied by fields and scrub and provided the ideal conditions for filming a western. The Tara set, which sat on a sloping rise at the north western corner of the property, was razed in 1959 to become the Jerusalem set for The Greatest Story Ever Told. By 1965 the site was occupied by the Stalag 13 set for Hogan's Heroes. Most of the sets, which included Camp Henderson on Gomer Pyle, were situated primarily in the center, south and west end of the property. The narrower east end was the site of a western town set at one time, and was later home to an unusual, narrow alley set lined by two long facades facing each other. The alley set was constructed for the Robert Wise film Star! (1968) with Julie Andrews in the lead role, and it also later made a brief appearance in the film Switchblade Sisters (1975), as did the streets and buildings of the central town area.

Overall, the property was an undulating plateau with a southern slope (by the town square) that led to Ballona Creek. Trees screened the northern and southern perimeter of the property.

== List of familiar backlot buildings ==
Core structures that stood for decades and appeared in many productions are listed here, most of which were constructed to represent, in Gone with the Wind, the antebellum Town of Atlanta, and later used for the fictional Mayberry. This portion of the backlot was the most permanent and thus the most recognizable, existing from 1939 until 1976. Other structures like the Jerusalem set, which was torched to make room for the Atlanta set, or Tara, which was replaced with the Hogan's Heroes, did not survive as long. The western/European set at the east end of the backlot disappeared in the late sixties.

The two main arteries that traversed the Atlanta/Mayberry set were Atlanta or Main Street, which ran east/west and opened at one point onto a town square, and North Street, a cross street that bisected it at the four corners just west of the square.

Image	Structure	flrs	Location	years	Seen on	Seen as
	church	2	SE end of town square	1947–76	The Andy Griffith Show; The Untouchables	All Souls Church
	courthouse	2	NE of town square	1947–76	The Andy Griffith Show; The Untouchables; Star Trek: The Original Series	Mayberry Courthouse
	residence	2	across from church	1939–76	The Andy Griffith Show; The Untouchables	the Taylor home
	bank	2	SE corner Atlanta/North	1939–76	Adventures of Superman; The Andy Griffith Show; The Untouchables; Gone with the Wind; Star Trek #28	Mayberry Bank; National Hotel; where Kirk & Spock emerge
	store/cafe	3	NW corner Atlanta/North	1939–76	The Andy Griffith Show; Gone with the Wind	Weaver's Department Store; Norcross Merchandise
	main hotel	2	center, town square	1945–76	The Andy Griffith Show; The Set-Up; Star Trek #8	Walker's Drug Store; Hotel Cozy; Rusk Hotel
	tall hotel	4	NW of town square	1947–76	The Andy Griffith Show; The Long Night; The Set-Up; Star Trek #28; Star Trek #8	Mayberry Hotel; Allegheny House; fire escape overlooking alley; ...where Kirk steals clothes; where Kirk finds Miri
	theatre	2	NW of town square	1939–75	Adventures of Superman; The Andy Griffith Show; The Untouchables; The Set-Up; Star Trek #28; Adventures of Superman	Grand Theatre; Paradise City Arena; 21st Street Mission; Smallville depot/Daily Planet
	buildings	2	rear of courthouse	1955–76	The Andy Griffith Show; Star Trek #8	feed grain store; Bartlett stable
	shop	2	E of town square	1955–76	The Andy Griffith Show; Star Trek #8	Biggs used furniture; Onlie's hideout
	store plaza	2	N of town square	1955–76	The Andy Griffith Show; Star Trek #28	Floyd's Barber Shop; Still labeled "Floyd's Barber Shop"
	depot	1	west of town	1939–71	Gone with the Wind	Atlanta Railroad Depot
	store/cafe	3	SW corner Atlanta/North	1939–76	Gone with the Wind	Lake & Lewis Hardware
	Tara	2	NW portion of backlot	1939–59	Gone with the Wind	The O'Hara plantation
	office	3	NW end of Atlanta St	1939–76	Gone with the Wind; Star Trek #28	Atlanta Examiner; where McCoy emerges
	cafe	2	S side of Atlanta St	1938–76	The Set-Up; Star Trek #28	Ringside Cafe; Walt's Restaurant
	hotel	2	SW of town square	1938–76	The Long Night; The Set-Up; Adventures of Superman	Travellers Hotel; Bijou Theatre; Hotel Silsby / hospital
	townhouse	2	top of North St	1950–76	Star Trek #21	Reger's home
	town hall	2	bottom of North St	1950–76	One Minute To Zero; Star Trek #21	Headquarters 5th Air Force; "The Red Hour" clock

== List of known productions at Forty Acres ==
=== Film ===
- The King of Kings (1927)
- The Godless Girl (1929)
- The Fall Guy (1930)
- Bird of Paradise (1932)
- The Most Dangerous Game (1932)
- Lucky Devils (1933)
- King Kong (1933)
- The Return of Chandu (film serial, 1934)
- The Little Minister (1934)
- Bonnie Scotland (1935)
- She (1935)
- The Garden of Allah (1936)
- Gone with the Wind (1939)
- The Hunchback of Notre Dame (1939)
- Intermezzo (1939)
- Rebecca (1940)
- Citizen Kane (1941)
- The Devil and Daniel Webster (aka, All That Money Can Buy, 1941)
- The Magnificent Ambersons (1942)
- Tarzan Triumphs (1943)
- Tarzan's Desert Mystery (1943)
- Tarzan and the Amazons (1945)
- China Sky (1945)
- The Story of G.I. Joe (1946)
- The Long Night (1947)
- Tarzan and the Huntress (1947)
- The Miracle of the Bells (1948)
- The Set-Up (1949)
- Tarzan's Magic Fountain (1949)
- The Big Steal (1949)
- Mighty Joe Young (1949) (used Arab village set)
- The Great Rupert (1950)
- Where Danger Lives (1950)
- Tripoli (1950)
- Tarzan's Peril (1951)
- Superman and the Mole Men (1951)
- Two Tickets to Broadway (1951)
- Macao (film) (1952)
- One Minute To Zero (1952)
- Eight Iron Men (1952)
- Tarzan and the She-Devil (1953)
- The Raid (1954)
- Escape to Burma (1955)
- Night of the Hunter (1955, riot scene only)
- Around the World in Eighty Days (1956, jungle set)
- Attack! (1956)
- Death of a Scoundrel (1956)
- Screaming Eagles (1956)
- Jet Pilot (1957)
- Verboten! (1959)
- Blood and Steel (1959)
- The Greatest Story Ever Told (1965)
- Ride Beyond Vengeance (1966)
- Star! (1968)
- Switchblade Sisters (1975)
- Lepke (1975)
- Ilsa, She Wolf of the SS (1975)
- The Fortune (1975)
- The Four Deuces (1976)
- Vigilante Force (1976)

=== Television ===
- Adventures of Superman (first season only, 1951–52)
- The Adventures of Jim Bowie (Tarzan jungle set / 1956-58)
- The Californians (1957)
- The Real McCoys (1957–62)
- Sheriff of Cochise/United States Marshal (1958–59)
- Yancy Derringer (1958–59)
- Westinghouse Desilu Playhouse (1958–1960)
- The Texan (1958–60)
- Man with a Camera (1958–60)
- The Untouchables (1959–60)
- Guestward Ho! (1960)
- The Andy Griffith Show (1960–1968)
- My Three Sons (occasional scenes between 1960–67)
- Miami Undercover (1961)
- Window on Main Street (1961)
- Ben Casey (1961)
- My Favorite Martian (1963)
- My Living Doll (1964)
- Gomer Pyle, U.S.M.C. (1964–69)
- I Spy (episode "Cops & Robbers", 1966)
- Hogan's Heroes (1965–1971)
- Family Affair (1966)
- Batman (1966–68)
- The Green Hornet (1966–67)
- Star Trek (four first season episodes: 1966-67)
- Mission: Impossible (first two seasons: 1966-68)
- That Girl (at least one scene in first season, 1966–67)
- Bonanza (episodes 271-275) (1967–68)
- Judd for the Defense (1967–69)
- Land of the Giants (episode "Ghost Town", 1968)
- Mayberry R.F.D. (first two seasons only: 1968-70)
- The New People (1969)

== See also ==
- History of film
- Movie studio
