= Mazuca amoena =

Scientific classification
- Domain: Eukaryota
- Kingdom: Animalia
- Phylum: Arthropoda
- Class: Insecta
- Order: Lepidoptera
- Superfamily: Noctuoidea
- Family: Noctuidae
- Genus: Mazuca
- Species: M. amoena

Binomial name
- Mazuca amoena Jordan, 1933

Species of moth

Mazuca amoena is a moth in the family Noctuidae. It can be found from the Democratic Republic of the Congo to Zimbabwe, with one instance in South Africa.

== Appearance ==
M. amoena is a white moth with black stripes along the border of the wing, a few red stripes along the mid-top, an orange circle along the ends of the wings, and smaller black circles towards the center.

== Taxonomy ==
M. amoena was named by Karl Jordan in 1933.
