= Milas (disambiguation) =

Milas is a city in south-west Turkey.

Milas may also refer to:

- Milas, Iran, a village in Chaharmahal and Bakhtiari Province, Iran
- Milas Rural District, in Chaharmahal and Bakhtiari Province, Iran
- Milaș, a commune in Bistriţa-Năsăud County, Romania
- Miles (bishop of Susa), also spelled Milas
- MILAS, an anti-submarine version of the Italian Otomat missile

== Fictional entities ==
- Milas, an Azure Striker Gunvolt 2 character

== See also ==
- Mila (disambiguation)
