= Myla =

Myla may refer to:

== People ==
- Myla Vicenti Carpio (born 1965), Native American historian
- Myla Dalbesio (born 1987), American model
- Myla Goldberg (born 1971), American novelist
- Myla Pablo (born 1993), Filipino volleyball player

== Places ==
- Myla, Russia
- Myla (river), Lena River trinutary, Russia
- Myla (Tsilma), Tsilma trinutary, Russia

== Other ==
- Myla (bug), a genus of bugs in the family Coreidae
- MYLA, Macedonian Young Lawyers Association

== See also ==
- Mila (disambiguation)
