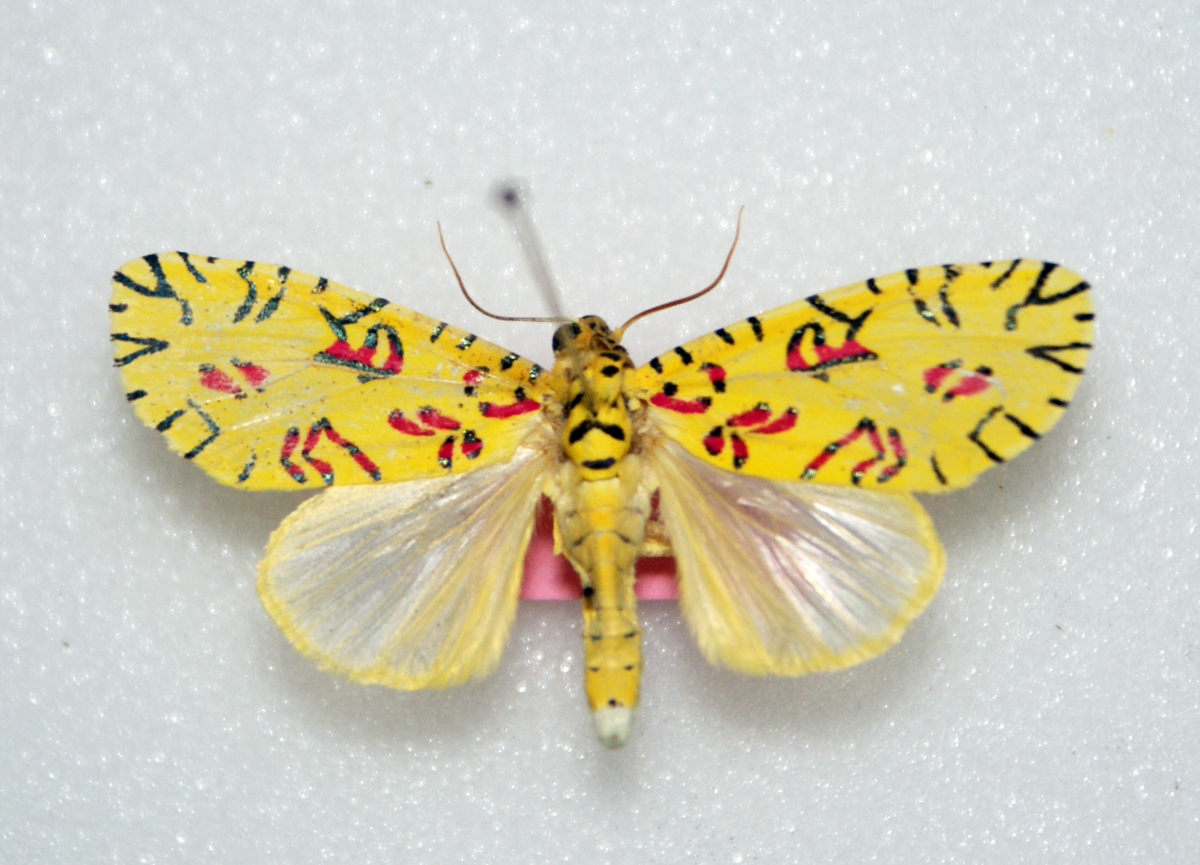

Scientific classification
- Domain: Eukaryota
- Kingdom: Animalia
- Phylum: Arthropoda
- Class: Insecta
- Order: Lepidoptera
- Superfamily: Noctuoidea
- Family: Noctuidae
- Genus: Mazuca
- Species: M. strigicincta

Binomial name
- Mazuca strigicincta Walker, 1866

Synonyms
- Hypsa concinnula Mabille, 1878; Apsarasa liturata Butler, 1881; Mila hebraica Aurivillius, 1891

= Mazuca strigicincta =

Species of moth

Mazuca strigicincta, the Pikachu moth, is a moth in the family Noctuidae found from Nigeria and Ghana down to northern Namibia and Mozambique.

== Taxonomy ==
=== Name ===
This taxon was named by Francis Walker in 1866.

==== Common name ====
The common name, Pikachu moth, comes from the fact that the moth shares colors with the popular Pokémon character Pikachu.

== Appearances in media ==
M. strigicincta appears on a commemorative Ghanaian postage stamp in 2002 along with other stamps featuring other species of moths. The stamp features the Pikachu moth with a purple background, with "Ghana" written in the top right and the characters "C4500" in the bottom left in red Comic Sans.
