= Mazuca dulcis =

Scientific classification
- Kingdom: Animalia
- Phylum: Arthropoda
- Clade: Pancrustacea
- Class: Insecta
- Order: Lepidoptera
- Superfamily: Noctuoidea
- Family: Noctuidae
- Genus: Mazuca
- Species: M. dulcis

Binomial name
- Mazuca dulcis Jordan, 1933

Synonyms
- Mazuca roseistriga Fletcher D. S., 1963

Species of moth

Mazuca dulcis is a species of moth in the family Noctuidae, described by Karl Jordan in 1933.

== Range ==
The species has been documented in the Democratic Republic of the Congo, Malawi, Nigeria, Togo, and Uganda.
