= Mila, Virginia =

Unincorporated community in Virginia, US

Mila is an unincorporated community in Northumberland County, in the U.S. state of Virginia. Mila is located at 37°50′32″N 76°19′39″W. It is surrounded by various communities; Sandy Point, Northumberland County, Virginia, Surprise Hill, Blackwells, and Lilian.
