= Hogan's Heroes =

American television sitcom (1965–1971)

- Genre: Sitcom
- Created by: Bernard Fein; Albert S. Ruddy
- Starring: Bob Crane; Werner Klemperer; John Banner; Robert Clary; Richard Dawson; Ivan Dixon; Larry Hovis; Kenneth Washington
- Music by: Jerry Fielding
- Country of origin: United States
- Original language: English
- No. of seasons: 6
- No. of episodes: 168 (list of episodes)

Production
- Producer: Edward H. Feldman
- Running time: 25 minutes
- Production companies: Alfran Productions; Bob Crane Enterprises; Bing Crosby Productions; CBS Productions

Original release
- Network: CBS
- Release: September 17, 1965 – April 4, 1971

Hogan's Heroes is an American television sitcom created by Bernard Fein and Albert S. Ruddy which is set in a prisoner-of-war (POW) camp in Nazi Germany during World War II. It centers on a group of Allied prisoners who use the POW camp as an operations base for sabotage and espionage activities directed against Nazi Germany. It ran for 168 episodes (six seasons) from September 17, 1965, to April 4, 1971, on the CBS network, and has been broadcast in reruns ever since.

Bob Crane starred as Colonel Robert E. Hogan, coordinating an international crew of Allied prisoners covertly running a special operations group from the camp. Werner Klemperer played Colonel Wilhelm Klink, the obtuse and oblivious commandant of the camp, and John Banner played the gullible and affable sergeant-of-the-guard Hans Schultz.

== Overview ==
Hogan's Heroes centers on U.S. Army Air Forces Colonel Robert Hogan and his staff of experts who are prisoners of war during World War II. The plot occurs during the permanent winter season in the fictionalized Stalag 13 just outside the real city of Hammelburg in Nazi Germany, though details in the show are inconsistent with the real-life Stalag XIII and city's location in Franconia.

According to a title overlay, the pilot episode takes place in 1942. According to subsequent storylines when the group was formed under Hogan's command, he (and they) received the following orders: "You will assist escaping prisoners, cooperate with all friendly forces, and use every means to harass and injure the enemy." Hogan recites those orders verbatim from memory in the Season 3 episode "The Collector General".

Pursuant to those orders, the group secretly uses the camp to conduct Allied espionage and sabotage and to help escaped Allied POWs from other prison camps via a secret network of tunnels that operate under the nose of the inept commandant Klink.

The prisoners cooperate with resistance groups (collectively called "the Underground"), defectors, spies, counterspies, and disloyal German officers to accomplish this. The prisoners sometimes bribe or blackmail otherwise loyal German officers so as to effectively manipulate their actions. Under Hogan's leadership, the prisoners also devise schemes such as having Sergeant Carter visit the camp disguised as Adolf Hitler as a distraction or rescuing a French Underground agent from Gestapo headquarters in Paris.

To the bafflement of his German colleagues who know him as an incompetent sycophant, Klink technically has a perfect operational record as camp commandant as no prisoners have successfully escaped during his tenure. Hogan and his men assist in maintaining this record so they can continue with their covert operations without active interference from the German military; Hogan would come up with tricks and cover-ups to fool Klink's superior General Albert Burkhalter and the Gestapo's Major Wolfgang Hochstetter.

Considering Klink's record, and the fact that the Allies would never bomb a POW camp, Stalag 13 appears to be a very secure location. As a result, the Germans often use the camp for high-level meetings to hide important persons and develop secret projects. Klink frequently has many other important visitors and is temporarily put in charge of special prisoners.

This brings the prisoners into contact with many VIPs, scientists, spies, high-ranking officers, and some of Germany's secret weapons projects, such as the Wunderwaffe and the German nuclear weapons program; the prisoners take advantage of this in their efforts to hinder the German war effort.

=== Setting ===
The setting is the fictional Luft Stalag 13, a prisoner-of-war camp for captured Allied airmen. Like the historical Stalag XIII-C, it is located just outside a town called Hammelburg. Stalag-13's location in the show is fictional, and does not correspond to the location of the actual Hammelburg. There are frequent references throughout the series to Düsseldorf being the nearest large city, and Düsseldorf is much farther northwest. In the season 1 episode "German Bridge Is Falling Down", Hogan points to a map, and he is clearly pointing to northwest Germany (if anything, even farther north than Düsseldorf).

The show is a combination of several writing styles that were popular in the 1960s: the "wartime" show, the "spy" show, and "camp comedy".

The camp has 103 Allied prisoners of war during the first season, but becomes larger by the end of the series. Few inmates have significant roles in the storylines other than the featured cast members.

In Stalag 13, there are always patches of snow. Beyond recreating an extreme or adverse setting, this was to prevent problems with continuity and to allow the episodes to be shown in any order. Episodes with obvious non-winter settings, such as "D-Day at Stalag 13," either did not film any scene on the outdoor set or were careful not to show any "snow."

== Characters ==
First season cast (l–r): Cynthia Lynn, Bob Crane, Werner Klemperer, John Banner, Ivan Dixon, Robert Clary, and Richard Dawson. Absent: Larry Hovis

- Bob Crane as U.S. Colonel Robert E. Hogan, the senior ranking POW officer and the leader of the men in the POW camp. He uses his wit and ingenuity to commit sabotage and obtain military information. Crane was offered the role after appearing as "guy next door" types in television shows like The Dick Van Dyke Show and as a regular in The Donna Reed Show.
- Werner Klemperer as German Colonel Wilhelm Klink, the commandant of the POW camp. He is completely unaware of Hogan's operation and is proud the camp has a perfect no-escape record under his command. In real life, Klemperer was from a Jewish family (his father was the orchestral conductor Otto Klemperer) and found the role to be a "double-edged sword"; his agent initially failed to tell him the role of Klink was intended to be comedic. Klemperer remarked, "I had one qualification when I took the job: if they ever wrote a segment whereby Colonel Klink would come out the hero, I would leave the show."
- John Banner as German Sergeant Hans Schultz, the camp's first sergeant. He is a clumsy and inept, but extremely affable man who often gives out information to the prisoners for bribes, or simply by talking too much, without realizing he is giving away information. Hogan and his men frequently plot or perform their subversive activities in plain sight of Schultz, knowing he would never report them for fear of being punished or sent to fight at the Eastern Front for allowing such activity on his watch. He would often exit the scene with his catch phrase "I know (see, hear) nothing!" Like Klemperer, Banner was born to Jewish parents and had also fled Nazi Germany and later served in the U.S. Army during World War II as a sergeant.
- Robert Clary as French Corporal Louis LeBeau, a gourmet chef, and patriotic Frenchman, frequently referred to as "the cockroach" by both Klink and Schultz. Clary was Jewish in real life and was deported to a Nazi concentration camp, but survived by using his talent in singing and dancing in shows. Clary said in an interview with the Los Angeles Times, "Singing, entertaining, and being in kind of good health at my age, that's why I survived. I was very immature and young and not really fully realizing what situation I was involved with ... I don't know if I would have survived if I really knew that."
- Richard Dawson as British Royal Air Force (RAF) Corporal Peter Newkirk, the group's con man, magician, pickpocket, card sharp, forger, bookie, tailor, lock picker, and safe cracker. He is a skilled tailor and is in charge of making uniforms for POWs impersonating German soldiers. Dawson's role as a military member in the film King Rat was reportedly the reason he landed a spot on Hogan's Heroes.
- Ivan Dixon as U.S. Staff Sergeant James "Kinch" Kinchloe (seasons 1–5), the man responsible for contacting the underground by radio. Casting Dixon, or any African-American actor, as a positively shown supporting character was a major step for a television show in the mid-1960s. Dixon left the show prior to the final season and was replaced by Kenneth Washington as Sgt. Richard Baker, another African-American character but with a less prominent role.

Larry Hovis as Sgt. Carter

- Larry Hovis as U.S. Technical Sergeant Andrew J. Carter, a bombardier who is an expert in chemistry, explosives, and demolitions. He makes explosive devices as needed. Hovis appeared in the pilot episode as a different character, but became a regular cast member when the show was picked up.
- Kenneth Washington as U.S. Sergeant Richard Baker (season 6). He assumed the duties of Sergeant Kinchloe after Ivan Dixon left the series. At the time of his death in July 2025, Washington was the last surviving member of the regular cast.

== Episodes ==
| Season | Episodes | Originally released | |
| Season | Episodes | First released | Last released |
|---|---|---|---|
| 1 | 32 | September 17, 1965 | April 29, 1966 |
| 2 | 30 | September 16, 1966 | April 7, 1967 |
| 3 | 30 | September 9, 1967 | March 30, 1968 |
| 4 | 26 | September 28, 1968 | March 22, 1969 |
| 5 | 26 | September 26, 1969 | March 27, 1970 |
| 6 | 24 | September 20, 1970 | April 4, 1971 |

== Broadcast history ==
- Friday at 8:30–9:00 p.m. on CBS: September 17, 1965 – April 7, 1967; September 26, 1969 – March 27, 1970
- Saturday at 9:00–9:30 p.m. on CBS: September 9, 1967 – March 22, 1969
- Sunday at 7:30–8:00 p.m. on CBS: September 20, 1970 – April 4, 1971

== Production ==
=== Locations ===
Hogan's Heroes was filmed in two locations. Indoor sets were housed at Desilu Studios (later known as Paramount Studios and Cinema General Studios). Outdoor scenes were filmed on the 40 Acres backlot. 40 Acres was in Culver City, in the Los Angeles metropolitan area. Filmed in warm Southern California, the series was set in Germany during the winter and the actors had to wear warm clothes and frequently pretended to be cold; there was always snow on the ground and rooftops and frost on the windows. The illusion of snow during the first several seasons was made using salt. By the fourth season, the set designers found a more permanent solution and lower cost, using white paint to give the illusion of snow.

After the series ended in 1971, the Stalag 13 set remained standing until 1974 when it was destroyed while filming the final scenes of Ilsa, She Wolf of the SS (1975).

=== Theme music ===
The theme music was composed by Jerry Fielding, who added lyrics to the theme for Hogan's Heroes Sing The Best of World War II – an album featuring Dixon, Clary, Dawson, and Hovis singing World War II songs. The song also appeared on the album Bob Crane, His Drums and Orchestra, Play the Funny Side of TV. Bob Crane, who had started out as a drummer, played the drums when the theme was recorded for the show. The opening drum riff played by Crane in the main title sequence of the show is the same as the riff used in The Longest Day (1962).

=== Jewish casting ===
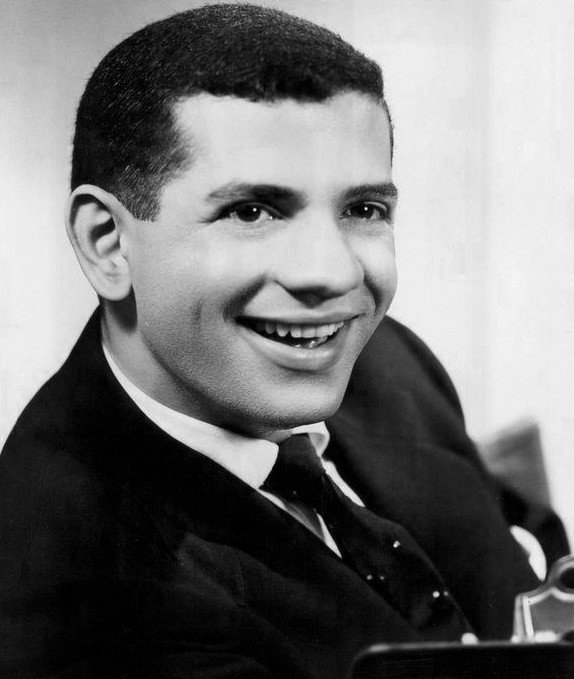
Robert Clary spent three years during World War II in a concentration camp and still had his ID tattoo on his arm.

The actors who played the four major German roles—Werner Klemperer (Klink), John Banner (Schultz), Leon Askin (General Burkhalter), and Howard Caine (Major Hochstetter)—were all Jewish or came from Jewish families (Klemperer's father was Jewish by birth). In fact, Klemperer, Banner, and Askin had all fled the Nazis before or during World War II (Caine, whose birth name was Cohen, was an American). Klemperer, the son of conductor Otto Klemperer, fled Hitler's Germany with his family in 1933. Banner emigrated from Switzerland to the United States when Germany annexed his native Austria in 1938. Askin emigrated from a pre-war French internment camp in 1940; his parents were initially transported to Theresienstadt, then Auschwitz, and killed at Lublin.

Robert Clary, a French Jew who played LeBeau, spent three years in a concentration camp (with an identity tattoo from the camp on his arm, "A-5714"); his parents and other family members were killed there. Other Jewish actors made multiple appearances, including Henry Corden (five episodes), Hans Conried, Karl Bruck, Harold Gould and Harold J. Stone, the latter two playing German generals. Also, the Jewish actresses Louise Troy, Arlene Martel, Jackie Joseph, and Nita Talbot each appeared in several episodes.

In addition to these actors, the program's creators, Bernard Fein and Albert Ruddy, were Jewish. In addition, the chief film editor, Michael Kahn (film editor), is Jewish.

=== Laugh track ===
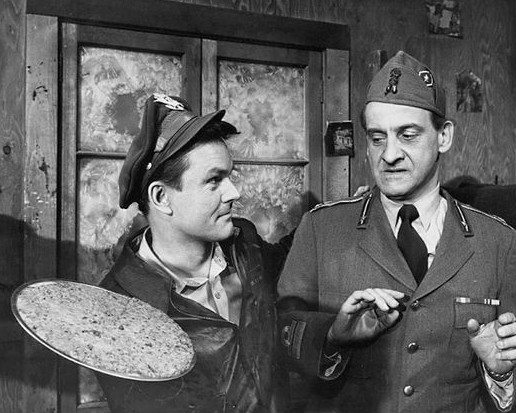
Col. Hogan with Major Bonacelli (Hans Conried) in the season 1 episode "The Pizza Parlor"

Network research indicated that the inclusion of a laugh track was considered essential for categorizing a single-camera show as a comedy. This hypothesis was tested on the pilot episode, "The Informer", presenting two versions to test audiences: one with a laugh track and one without. The version without the laugh track, due in part to the show's more cerebral humor, performed poorly, while the version with the laugh track garnered a more favorable reception. Consequently, Hogan's Heroes was broadcast with the laugh track, and CBS subsequently incorporated laugh tracks into all of its comedic programming.

=== German release: Ein Käfig voller Helden ===
Despite its international success as a parody of the Nazis, the series was unknown on German television for decades.

German film distributor KirchGruppe acquired broadcasting rights to the show but initially did not air it out of fear that it would offend viewers; in 1992, Hogan's Heroes was finally aired on German television for the first time, but the program failed to connect with viewers due to issues with lip syncing. However, after the dialogue was rewritten to make the German characters look even more foolish (ensuring that viewers understood the characters were caricatures) the show became more successful.

First aired in 1992 on Sat.1 with the title Stacheldraht und Fersengeld, roughly 'Barbed wire and skedaddle', it was soon renamed, somewhat more whimsically in German, to Ein Käfig voller Helden ('A cage full of heroes'), to make it more relatable to the German viewer, and aired under this title from 1994 on, on the Kabel 1 station. Klink and Schultz were given broad Saxon and Bavarian accents, playing on regional stereotypes to underline the notion that they are comical figures. An unseen original character, "Frau Kalinke", was introduced in dialogue only as Klink's maid and perennial mistress, whom he described as performing most of her cleaning duties in the nude.

== Legal issues ==
Donald Bevan and Edmund Trzcinski wrote the 1951 play Stalag 17, a World War II prisoner-of-war story turned into the 1953 feature film Stalag 17 by Paramount Pictures. They sued Hogan's Heroes producer Bing Crosby for infringement, but their lawsuit was unsuccessful. The jury found in favor of the plaintiffs, but a federal judge overruled them. The judge found "striking difference in the dramatic mood of the two works."

In 2012, an arbitration hearing was scheduled to determine whether Bernard Fein and Albert S. Ruddy, the creators of the show, had transferred to Bing Crosby Productions the right to make a movie of Hogan's Heroes along with the television rights, or had retained the derivative movie rights. In 2013, Fein's estate and Ruddy acquired the sequel and other separate rights to Hogan's Heroes from Mark Cuban via arbitration, and a movie was planned based on the show.

== Reception ==
Hogan's Heroes won two Emmy Awards out of twelve nominations. Both wins were for Werner Klemperer as Outstanding Performance by an Actor in a Supporting Role in a Comedy, in 1968 and 1969. Klemperer received nominations in the same category in 1966, 1967 and 1970. The series' other nominations were for Outstanding Comedy Series in 1966, 1967 and 1968; Bob Crane for Outstanding Continued Performance by an Actor in a Leading Role in a Comedy Series in 1966 and 1967; Nita Talbot for Outstanding Performance by an Actress in a Supporting Role in a Comedy in 1968; and Gordon Avil for cinematography in 1968.

The producers of Hogan's Heroes were honored in the first annual NAACP Image Awards, presented in August 1967, one of seven television shows and two news shows that were recognized for "the furtherance of the Negro image." Other honorees included I Spy, Daktari, Star Trek and Mission: Impossible.

In December 2005, the series was listed at number 100 as part of the "Top 100 Most Unexpected Moments in TV History" by TV Guide and TV Land. The show was described as an "unlikely POW camp comedy."

=== Nielsen ratings ===
Note: The highest average rating for the series is in bold text.

| Season | Rank | Rating |
|---|---|---|
| 1) 1965–1966 | #9 | **24.9** |
| 2) 1966–1967 | #17 | 21.8 (Tied with The CBS Friday Night Movies) |
| 3) 1967–1968 | #38 | 18.7 |
| 4) 1968–1969 | #39 | 19.8 |
| 5) 1969–1970 | Not in the Top 30 | 18.9 |
| 6) 1970–1971 | Not in the Top 30 | n/a |

== Home media ==
Paramount Home Entertainment (under CBS DVD starting in 2006) has released all six seasons of Hogan's Heroes on DVD in regions 1 and 4. The series was previously released by Columbia House as individual discs, each with five or six consecutive episodes, as well as on a compilation 42 VHS collection of the 168 episodes.

On March 8, 2016, CBS Home Entertainment re-released a repackaged version of the complete series set, at a lower price.

In Australia (Region 4), the first DVD releases were from Time-Life (from around 2002–2005) with each disc sold individually with 4–5 episodes per disc. Between 2005 and 2007 these same discs were packaged as individual complete-season collections.

The complete series was released on Blu-ray in Germany in 2018. The set consists of 23 double-layer BD-50 discs. The discs are region-free. While menus and titles are in German, the episodes include both German and original English audio tracks. On December 13, 2022, Paramount Pictures released the entire Blu-ray series in the United States.

| DVD Name | Episodes | Release dates | |
| DVD Name | Episodes | Region 1 | Region 4 |
|---|---|---|---|
| The Complete First Season | 32 | March 15, 2005 | July 30, 2008 |
| The Complete Second Season | 30 | September 27, 2005 | November 7, 2008 |
| The Complete Third Season | 30 | March 7, 2006 | March 5, 2009 |
| The Complete Fourth Season | 26 | August 15, 2006 | June 3, 2009 |
| The Complete Fifth Season | 26 | December 19, 2006 | August 4, 2009 |
| The Complete Sixth and Final Season | 24 | June 5, 2007 | September 30, 2009 |
| The Complete Series (The Kommandant's Collection) | 168 | November 10, 2009 | December 3, 2009 |
| The Complete Series | 168 | March 8, 2016 December 17, 2019 (Repackaged) | August 12, 2020 |

== Merchandise and promotion ==
In 1965, Fleer produced a 66-trading card set based on the series. Dell Comics produced nine issues of a series based on the show from 1966 to 1969, all with photo covers. The artwork was provided by Henry Scarpelli. Mad magazine #108 (January 1967) parodied the show as "Hokum's Heroes". An additional one-page parody called "Hochman's Heroes" took the show's premise to the next level by setting it in Buchenwald concentration camp.

In 1968, Clary, Dawson, Dixon, and Hovis recorded an album titled Hogan's Heroes Sing the Best of World War II, which included lyrics for the theme song. While the show was in production, Crane, Klemperer, Askin, and Banner all appeared (as different characters) in the 1968 film The Wicked Dreams of Paula Schultz.

== Film adaptation ==
Warner Bros. at one point purchased an option for a Hogan's Heroes movie and hired Peter Doyle to write a screenplay, but eventually let the rights lapse. In June 1998, Jim Burke optioned the rights from Rysher Entertainment, the rights holder of the library of Bing Crosby Productions including Hogan's Heroes, and in turn brought them to Paramount Pictures who'd experienced success with TV-to-film adaptations such as The Addams Family and The Brady Bunch Movie. In September of that year, Mel Gibson and Bruce Davey's Icon Productions had begun talks with Paramount to develop and co-finance the adaptation of Hogan's Heroes with Gibson as the potential lead. In September 1999, it was reported the rights had been acquired by Destination Films after Paramount decided not to pursue the adaptation, with a screenplay by producer Keith Samples that would be developed as the shooting script. In October of that year, Destination hired Ross LaManna to write the adaptation. In May 2001, Revolution Studios acquired the rights to Hogan's Heroes following the collapse of Destination Films and hired Dick Clement and Ian La Frenais to write the script. In November of that year, Revolution was reportedly developing the film with Imagine Entertainment as a potential vehicle for Russell Crowe. In 2019, a sequel TV series featuring the descendants of the original cast was reportedly being planned by original series co-creator Al Ruddy, Village Roadshow Entertainment Group and Rough Pictures.

== See also ==
- 'Allo 'Allo!
- Auto Focus
- Colditz Castle
- The Colditz Story
- Colditz (1972 TV series)
- Escape to Victory
- The Great Escape
- Heil Honey I'm Home!
- M*A*S*H
- Oflag XIII-B – officers' camp located outside Hammelburg
