= Miri (Star Trek: The Original Series) =

- Star Trek: The Original Series episode
- Episode no.: Season 1 Episode 8
- Directed by: Vincent McEveety
- Written by: Adrian Spies
- Cinematography by: Jerry Finnerman
- Production code: 12
- Original air date: October 27, 1966

Guest appearances
- Kim Darby – Miri; Jim Goodwin – Farrell; Michael J. Pollard – Jahn; Irene Sale – Louise; David Ross – Security Guard #1; Steven McEveety, John Megna, Keith Taylor, Ed McCready, Kellie Flanagan, Iona Morris, Phil Morris, Darleen Anita Roddenberry, Dawn Roddenberry, Lisabeth Shatner, Melanie Shatner, Leslie Carol Shatner and Scott Whitney – "Children"

Episode chronology
← Previous "What Are Little Girls Made Of?"	Next → "Dagger of the Mind"
- Star Trek: The Original Series season 1

"Miri" is the eighth episode of the first season of the American science fiction television series Star Trek. Written by Adrian Spies and directed by Vincent McEveety, it first aired on NBC on October 27, 1966.

In the episode, the USS Enterprise discovers an exact duplicate of Earth, where the only survivors of a deadly man-made plague are some of the planet's children.

== Plot ==
The USS Enterprise answers a planetary distress call.

A landing party of Captain Kirk, First Officer Spock, Chief Medical Officer Dr. McCoy, Yeoman Janice Rand and two security personnel find a world that appears to be a duplicate of Earth and resembles an abandoned, 1960s-style Earth. They are attacked by a disfigured man, who has a seizure and dies after Kirk hits him while trying to fend him off. Noises draw the landing party to an abandoned building. They discover a young woman named Miri, who had run away from them because they were 'grups' ('grownups). She and her friends are 'onlies', the only ones left. The distress call is traced to an automated signal.

The landing party, except for Spock, notice purple lesions on their bodies; Miri tells them that these are the first signs of the disease that has infected the planet and they will soon become like the other adults. The party find a medical research laboratory and look through documents for clues to the disease, discovering that it is a side effect of a life-extension experiment, affecting those who have reached puberty; death follows a brief period of violent madness. The 'children' are actually over 300 years old, aging one month every century, but show the mental and emotional maturity of their biological age, rather than their actual age. When the disease begins, its victims have approximately seven days to live. Although Spock is apparently immune, he considers himself a carrier who could infect the Enterprise's crew if he returns.

Kirk uses his charm on Miri to persuade her to show him to the other children. However, mistrustful of the 'grups', they disperse when Kirk and Miri approach their hideout. Jahn, an older boy and the leader of the children, steals the landing party's communicators. Without them, they are cut off from the Enterprise's computers, hindering McCoy's search for a cure. When Yeoman Rand panics at their impending fate and Kirk comforts her, a jealous Miri runs away and schemes with her friends to kidnap Rand.

McCoy discovers a possible vaccine for the disease, but without the ability to check the dosage with the ship's computers, the vaccine may kill the patient. Kirk tells Miri that they will all contract the disease if they do not help him find a cure. Upon realizing that she herself is infected, Miri brings Kirk to where Rand is being held. At Jahn's urging, the children swarm and gang up on Kirk. An injured and bleeding Kirk then angrily begs the children to think of the youngest amongst them, who will be helpless when the older ones are dead. Convinced, Jahn gives the communicators back to Kirk. He rounds up the children and returns to the laboratory, but in desperation McCoy has already injected himself with a dose of the vaccine. The doctor's sores fade, confirming the cure's effectiveness.

Back on the Enterprise, after vaccinating everyone and leaving the children in the care of a medical team, Kirk sends for teachers and advisers to help the children improve their lives.

== Reception ==
Zack Handlen of The A.V. Club gave the episode an A− rating, describing using children as the antagonists as one of the script's "smarter twists". Handlen felt that the sense of threat was maintained throughout as, although the audience knew the crew wouldn't die, "they don't know that."

== BBC ban ==
Following the first screening of "Miri" on British television in December 1970, the BBC received a number of complaints regarding the episode's content. The quantity and nature of the complaints were never made public.

Throughout the 1970s and 1980s the BBC chose not to include the episode in repeat runs of Star Trek. Three other episodes from the series were also excluded: "Plato's Stepchildren", "The Empath", and "Whom Gods Destroy".

Fans writing to the BBC to complain about the ban during the show's repeat run in the mid-1980s, its fifth showing altogether, received a standard reply: "There are no plans to screen the four episodes because we feel that they deal most unpleasantly with the already unpleasant subjects of madness, torture, sadism and disease. You will appreciate that account must be taken that out of Star Trek's large and enthusiastic following, many are juveniles who would watch the programme no matter what time of day the series is put into the programme schedules." However, the ban was finally lifted for the BBC's next showing of the series in the early 1990s. In 2020 it was also shown in Britain on the Horror Channel.

== Production ==
The planetary exteriors were shot on the set used for fellow Desilu series The Andy Griffith Show, part of what had originally been known as the RKO Forty Acres backlot in Culver City which had been acquired by Desilu.

Apart from guest stars Kim Darby (age 19) and Michael J. Pollard (age 27), several of the children on Miri's world were portrayed by relatives of the Trek cast and crew. Among them were William Shatner's daughters Lisabeth and Melanie, Grace Lee Whitney's son Scott, Vincent McEveety's son Steven, and Gene Roddenberry's daughters, Darleen and Dawn. Two others, Phil and Iona Morris, children of Mission Impossible actor Greg Morris, later appeared in subsequent Star Trek shows as well.

This was child actress Kellie Flanagan's first television role. She played the Blonde Girl standing on the table in the schoolhouse. Between takes her agent, Dorothy Day Otis, got her a line to deliver during the scene, which led to Flanagan receiving her SAG card.

Another of the actors playing the children, John Megna, had played Charles Baker "Dill" Harris in To Kill a Mockingbird in 1962.

"Miri" was the first episode to feature regular background cast member David L. Ross as Lieutenant Galloway, one of the few core group of extras that had speaking lines throughout the series.

== Tie-in novels ==
The novel The Cry of the Onlies by Judy Klass takes place after the events of the episode. In that novel, there were no references to Miri's world being a duplicate Earth and the planet was instead presented as a long-forgotten colony of Earth.

Miri's world was again revisited in Christopher L. Bennett's novel Forgotten History. In that novel, Miri's planet was not simply a duplicate of Earth, it was Earth, from an alternate universe which had briefly drifted into contact with the prime universe.
