= Buraco =

Card game

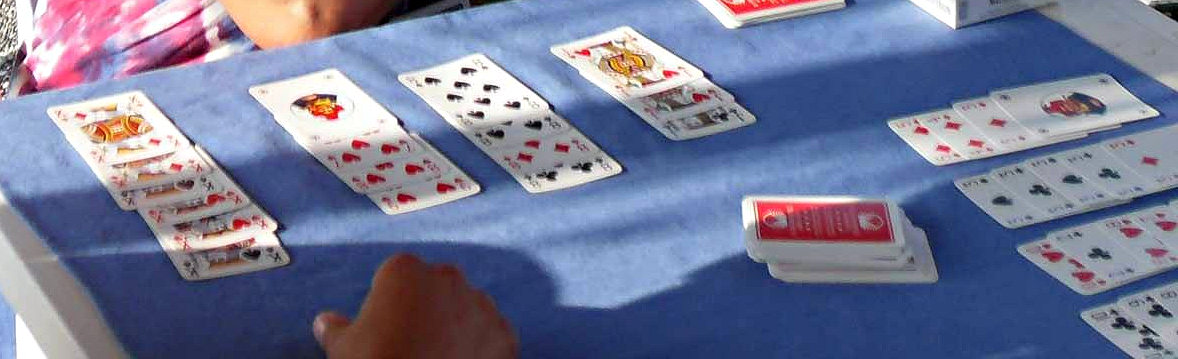
- Origin: Argentina/Uruguay
- Type: Matching
- Players: 4
- Skills: Tactics & Strategy
- Cards: 104 cards
- Deck: French
- Rank (high→low): A K Q J 10 9 8 7 6 5 4 3 2
- Play: Clockwise
- Playing time: from 40 minutes to several hours
- Chance: Medium

Related games
- Canasta

Buraco is a Rummy-type card game in the Canasta family for four players in fixed partnerships in which the aim is to lay down combinations in groups of cards of equal rank and suit sequences, there being a bonus for combinations of seven cards or more. Buraco is a variation of Canasta which allows both standard melds (groups of cards of the same value) as well as sequences (cards in numerical order in the same suit). It originated from Uruguay and Argentina in the mid-1940s, with apparent characteristics of simplicity and implications that are often unforeseeable and absolutely involving. Its name derives from the "lunfardo", castellano word "buraco" which means “hole”, applied to the minus score of any of the two partnerships. The game is also popular in the Arab world, specifically in the Persian Gulf; where it is known as 'Baraziliya' (Brazilian). Another popular variation of Buraco, called "Burraco" is played in Italy.

== Game rules as played in the United States ==
=== The Setup ===
Buraco is played with two 52-card decks of standard playing cards, and 2 jokers for each deck, for a total of 108 cards. In Argentina it can be played with a set of 106 Burako, Rummikub, or similar, tiles with only two jokers. Team members sit opposite each other, so that no team member is sitting next to their own teammate.

Before beginning the game, the players cut the deck to establish who deals first. The player from the team who has the lowest card must deal to the player of the other team who has cut the highest card. In the case of two identical cards being chosen, two new cards must be cut. The dealer shuffles and the player to their right cuts the deck.

The opponent sitting to the right of the dealer attempts to cut exactly twenty-two cards off the top of the deck. If exactly twenty-two cards are cut off the top of the deck, then that team immediately gains one hundred extra points. This person uses these cards to make two (2) hands of eleven cards each, and the first hand is crossed over the second and they are both stacked in a corner of the card table. These two hands are called the 'pots" (in Portuguese "the dead"; os mortos).

=== The Deal ===
While the pots are being made, the dealer distributes eleven cards to each player one by one in a round-robin manner; these cards are called the players’ hand(s). If during the dealing any mistake is made then (e.g., one card too many, one card too few, cards upturned) the hands and the pots must be re-dealt. Responsibility for dealing the cards always proceeds clockwise from game to game. The remaining cards, placed face-down in the center of the table, make the stock. One card from the stock is placed face-up to its side, becoming the first card of the discard pile.

=== Melds ===
Each team has its own collection of melds (in Portuguese "table") that are shared by both players; that is, both players build on each other's runs in turn. A player from one team may not play on the other team's runs.

Melds can be made in one of two ways:

- Sequences: Three (3) or more cards of the same suit in sequentially increasing (or decreasing) order. Cards may not be melded into these runs out of order or by skipping any positions. An example of the proper sequencing of the cards in this type of run is:

A – 2 – 3 – 4 – 5 – 6 – 7 – 8 – 9 –10 – J – Q – K – A

- Groups: Three or more face-cards of the same value (all jacks, all queens, all kings, or all aces).

Melds of seven or more cards earn extra points for the team, and are classified in one of two ways:

- Clean run: Seven or more cards without a wildcard. A clean run is shown by the last two cards placed face up across the others in a horizontal position.
- Dirty run: Seven or more cards with a wildcard. Every group with a wildcard will always be dirty. A Dirty run is shown by the last card placed face up across the others in a horizontal position.

=== Wildcards ===
- All deuces can be wild; a deuce is considered to be a wildcard when used to substitute any card in a meld.
- A meld may have at most one wildcard, either a deuce or a joker.
- A deuce in a sequence is not a wildcard if it represents the face value of 2 in the meld and is of the same suit. For example, these are valid sequences of a clean meld:
  - A-2-3-4-5-6-7
  - 2-3-4-5-6-7-8
- If a deuce is used to represent a face value of 2 in a sequence and is not used as a wildcard, then the meld is still clean.
- If a wildcard is played on a clean meld, then the meld becomes dirty and reduces the value of the additional points earned.
- A Sequence may have two deuces only
  - One deuce is used as a wildcard (not a face value of 2), and
  - The other deuce is used to represent its face value of 2 in the meld.
  - For example, these are valid dirty melds:
    - A-2-3-4-5-6-2
    - 2-2-3-4-5-6-7
    - A-2-2-4-5-6-7
- If a deuce is used as a wildcard, then a joker cannot be placed into the same meld
- If a meld contains a deuce used as a wildcard, a joker can be added to the meld only after moving the deuce to its face value

=== Scoring ===
The first team to accumulate two thousand or more points wins the match. There are multiple games during a match. Points are earned by making melds of three or more cards face-up on the table, and each card played in a run earns a point value for the team that played the card.

Point values for cards/tiles in Buraco/Burako
| Card | Value |
|---|---|
| 3, 4, 5, 6, 7 | 5 |
| 8, 9, 10, J, Q, K | 10 |
| A (Ace) | 15 |
| 2 | 20 |
| Joker | 30 |

When the game is over, players with cards in their hand that were not melded count negatively against their team's total score for the match.

Point melds for in Buraco/Burako
| Meld | Value |
|---|---|
| clean run (no wild cards/tiles) | 200 points. |
| dirty run (including wild cards/tiles) | 100 points. |

- Variation: If a run has 7 clean cards in a row plus a deuce, it is worth 150 points, but this rule is valid only for one of the eight Italian "Burraco Federations".

Additionally, if a team did not take a hand from the pot, then they must subtract one hundred points from their team's total score for the match.

If the game ends before any cards are played from a new hand picked up from the pot, then the player with that new hand will either:

- Subtract the combined point value of all the cards against their team's total score for the match, or
- Subtract one hundred points from their team's total score for the match.

If a team ends the game (If a player plays all the cards in their hand and the team has taken a hand from the pot and the team has at least one clean run), then that team adds one hundred points to their team's total score for the match.

=== First Draw ===
The first draw of the game varies from subsequent draws in every game as there is no discard pile at the beginning of the game. The first play is made by the person sitting to the left of the dealer. The top card is drawn from the stock and if the player likes that card, then it is placed into the first player's hand. If the first player does not want the first card of the game, then that card is immediately turned face-up to the side of the stock to begin the discard pile, and the first player draws another card from the stock. If the first player accepts the first card of the game then another card may not be drawn by that player on that turn.

Note: As soon as the first card drawn is placed in the hand of the first player, then that player has accepted that card – if the player discards this same card after it is placed in the hand, then the player has exhausted their turn and play proceeds to the next player.

=== Initial Melding ===
Melding is the act of displaying your cards face-up on the table to earn points. A team may only begin to place runs onto the table if they meld a minimum number of initial points. This minimum initial meld number varies based upon the total number of points already earned by that team in the match. A team with less than fifteen hundred points in the match must initially meld a minimum of fifty points. A team with fifteen hundred or more points in the match must initially meld a minimum of seventy-five points. If a team fails to meld the minimum initial number of points, then all the runs are placed back into the hand of the player and fifteen more points are added to the initial number to meld for that team during that game.

The sum of the values of the cards played in the player's turn must equal or exceed the minimum initial meld requirement according to the player/team's total score:

| Team score | Minimum initial meld |
|---|---|
| Less than 1500 | 50 |
| 1500 - 2995 | 75 |

=== Course of Play ===
Play always proceeds clockwise. Each player begins their turn by drawing. Except for the first draw of the game, drawing can be either:

- Take a single card from the top of the stock, or
- Pick-up ALL of the cards in the discard pile. Before drawing, players may examine and re-arrange the discard pile in any manner.

Note: A player may not advise, verbally or otherwise, their teammate on whether they prefer a draw from the stock or the discard pile.

After a player draws, the player can meld for more points by putting any new runs onto the table and adding cards onto their own team's runs already on the table. A player may only meld during their turn. Once a card is melded, it may not be moved into a different run or picked up and placed into a player's hand. However, wildcards may be moved within a meld.

Note: A player may not advise, verbally or otherwise, their teammate on how they prefer them to meld any of their cards.

Aces may rank high or low, and more than one ace may be played in a run.

A player's turn ends when a card is discarded by that player from their hand. A discard is complete when the discarded card is no longer touched by the discarding player.

After throwing away a card to the discard pile, no other move (e.g., putting down more cards, substituting cards, changing the discarded card) is permitted until the player's next turn.

=== The Pot (os mortos) ===
If a player plays all the cards in their hand and their team has not yet taken a hand from the pot (the sets of 11 cards set aside at the deal), then the player picks-up the next hand from the pot. The player who has melded all their cards takes a hand from the pot and if the player:

- Has not discarded, continues to play ("in-flight") from the new hand.
- Has discarded, play from the new hand commences at that player's next turn. This new hand may only be played at the player's next turn and must not even be looked at until the player's partner has taken their turn.

If a team has picked up a hand from the pot, and they do not have a clean run, then that team may not play all the cards in either of their hands.

If the stock is empty and there are cards in the pot, then the next hand from the pot will be moved into the stock. In this case, it is certain at least one team will need to subtract points from their total number earned for the match.

=== Ending the Hand ===
If a player plays all the cards in their hand and the team has taken a hand from the pot and the team has at least one clean meld (variation:or dirty meld), then the game ends.

If the stock is empty and there are not any cards in the pot, then the game is over without either team earning additional points for ending that game.

== Variations ==
- Add the jokers as wildcards with a value of thirty points each.
- Add one more deck of cards so there can be three teams of two players each, or two teams of three players each. The pot will consist of three hands and the person making the pot will cut for thirty-three cards.
- Aces are high only.
- Aces are low only.
- The game ends on either a clean run or dirty run.
- Play for a predefined duration rather than a point total. The team with the most points wins.

== See also ==
- Biriba
- Canasta
- Rummy
