= Mila (surname) =

Mila (and its variant Milà) is a surname. It is used in Spain. It was one of the surnames used in the United States and was recorded in the 1990 census.

Notable people with the surname include:

- Anselmo Alliegro y Milá (1899–1961), Cuban politician
- Ernesto Milá (born 1952), Catalan Spanish political activist
- Irkham Zahrul Mila (born 1998), Indonesian football player
- Jessica Mila (born 1992), Indonesian actress
- Karlo Mila (born 1974), New Zealand writer and poet
- Leonora Milà Romeu (born 1942), Catalan Spanish pianist and composer
- Lorenzo Milá (born 1960), Spanish newscaster and journalist
- Luis de Milà y de Borja (1432–1510), Catholic cardinal in Spain
- Manuel Milà i Fontanals (1818–1884), Spanish scholar
- Massimo Mila (1910–1988), Italian musicologist
- Mercedes Milá (born 1951), Spanish television presenter and journalist
- Salvador Milà (born 1953), Spanish politician
- Sebastian Mila (born 1982), Polish football player
- Shahid Mila, known as Mila Islam (born 1988), Bangladeshi singer
