= Prison camp =

Prison camp may refer to:

- Concentration camp
- Federal prison camp, low-security facility among those on list of U.S. federal prisons
- Internment camp
- Labor camp
- Prisoner-of-war camp

== See also ==
- Prison
- Gulag
