= DeMille =

DeMille or De Mille is a surname. Notable people with the surname include:

- Agnes De Mille, American dance and choreographer
- Beatrice deMille, English-born American playwright and screenwriter
- Cecil B. DeMille, American film director
- Constance Adams DeMille, American actress
- Evelyn de Mille (1919–2013), Canadian bookseller
- Henry Churchill de Mille, American playwright
- James De Mille, Canadian writer
- Katherine DeMille, Canadian-born American actress
- Nelson DeMille, American author
- Oliver DeMille, American author and educator
- Richard de Mille, American journalist and author
- William C. deMille, American screenwriter and film director
