= Evelyn de Mille =

Canadian businesswoman (1919–2013)

Evelyn de Mille (August 1, 1919 – October 31, 2013) was a Canadian known for being the first woman in Calgary, Alberta to own her own stand-alone bookstore. She opened her first bookstore in 1956. In 1974, she became the first woman in Canada to found a bookstore chain.

In 1972, she was the first female president of the Canadian Booksellers Association. In this role, she helped found the Bookseller of the Year Awards. In 1974, she sold her business to W H Smith, with whom she was involved in a legal dispute. Evelyn de Mille bought the Owl's Nest bookstore in 1979 and operated it until she sold it in 1996. In 1999, she announced she was retiring permanently from the trade and would sell her last remaining book store, DeMille Technical Books. It was later sold to McNally Robinson bookstore chain.

In 1998, she was awarded an honorary degree as a Doctor of Laws by the University of Calgary.

DeMille Technical Books operated as part of McNally Robinson's Calgary store from 2002 until McNally Robinson closed the store in 2008.

Under the advice and mentorship of Evelyn DeMille, the assets of DeMille Technical Books were bought by Charlie Perry and the bookstore was re-established under the name DeMille Technical and Business Books Ltd. The bookstore store continued to serve professionals, trades people and students from its location in downtown Calgary at (Second Level) Standard Life Tower, 639 5th Avenue S.W. Until a few months before her death Evelyn DeMille was an advocate of independent business and was an advisor to DeMille Books. In January 2016, DeMille Technical Books suspended its operations.

Evelyn purchased a page of the Gutenberg bible, and donated it to the University of Calgary, where it now resides in their library. This entry will be updated with news on her further willed donations and long-term support to the University of Calgary.
