= Millia =

Millia is a feminine given name. Notable people with this name include:

- Millia Davenport, American costumer and theater scholar
- Millia Rage, fictional character in the Guilty Gear video game series

== See also ==
- Millie (disambiguation)
- Milium (dermatology) (plural is milia)
- Jamia Millia Islamia, university in India
