= Biriba =

Card game

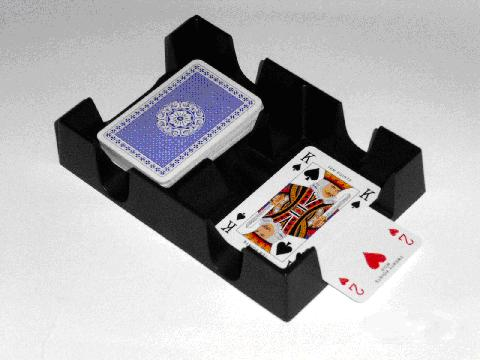
- Origin: Greece
- Type: Matching
- Players: 2-6
- Skills: Tactics & Strategy
- Cards: 108 cards
- Deck: Anglo-American
- Rank (high→low): A K Q J 10 9 8 7 6 5 4 3 2
- Play: Counter-clockwise
- Playing time: 4 hours
- Chance: Medium

Related games
- Buraco Canasta

Biriba (Greek: Μπιρίμπα) is a Greek variant of the card game rummy based on the Italian Pinnacola. It is played by two to six players, with two decks and 4 Jokers comprising 108 cards. If 6 players play, one more deck and two jokers more are added. Biriba can also be played by three players with or without partnership rules.

The Greek name may come from the Italian game Biribara, or Biribisso, or Biribi, even if this game is totally different (more similar to the roulette).

== Basics ==
While there are many variations of Biriba, the basic rules and objective are the same. The player to the right of the dealer shuffles the cards and their partner cuts the deck (the starting dealer is selected by a random draw, the lowest card winning the privilege to receive cards and play first.) Eleven cards are dealt to each player while two other sets of 11 cards are also dealt by one of the opponents and put face down to the side. These cards (two secondary 11-card hands) are called Paketa ("packages" or "parcels") or Biribakia (Greek for "small Biribas".) The objective of the game is to be the first player or team to surpass a pre-determined point total (commonly 2,500 or 3,000, based on the number of players.) Points are tabulated at the end of each round of play from the tableau played by each player/team.

Play proceeds counter-clockwise; each player begins their turn by either drawing one single card from the deck, or collecting all of the cards in the discard pile. After drawing, the player may lay cards down in sets of at least three (either suited runs or groups of like-numbered cards.) Jokers and 2s (known as "balladaires") are wild and may substitute for any card in such a set, and even be repositioned within that set. For instance, a player may lay down the four, five, and seven of hearts, with the two of clubs substituting for the six of hearts. If the player later draws the six of hearts, they may lay it in its correct position and move the two of clubs into the position of the three or the eight. Each set (except for sets composed entirely of twos) may only contain one wild card, whether joker or deuce, although an in-suit two in its natural position does not count as wild or dirty. Once played, sets may not be connected or withdrawn back to the hand, and individual cards may not be removed from the table (therefore, any group dirtied with a joker or a non-suited two can never become clean.) The players complete their turns by placing one card from their hand into the discard pile (players can take no action and play no cards when it is not their turn.)

When a player has melded all of the cards from his or her initial hand they then receive the top-most Paketo. If the player did not have to discard to empty their hand, they may continue play with their new cards; otherwise, their turn is complete and they must wait. The next goal is to "close" the round by emptying their second hand. The player who ends the round receives an additional 100 points. However the player must meet three conditions to close out: the player must have played at least one valid biriba, they must be able to discard a card, and if their hand is reduced to one card and the discard pile contains only one card they may not draw that card, connect either the new or held card, and discard. Points are calculated at the end of each round, and if no player or team has won another round is played with dealership and right-to-receive passed to the left. No information (other than score) is retained between rounds; new hands are dealt and a new atout is determined.

=== Sets ===
Below are the following sets in Biriba. Sets are either arranged the way a straight flush is arranged in Poker or by using the same numbers or face cards.

Biriba: a group containing at least seven cards. If the set is consecutive suited cards then it is worth 200 points if there are no jokers (kathari, which is Greek for "clean", also Gnisia (pure) and Parthena (virgin)) are worth 100 points if there is a joker or a wild two (vromiki, (dirty) or bastardemeni (bastard)). If the set is of like-numbers (seven threes, for instance,) then the Biriba is worth 300 points. However, if a joker or wild two are used in the meld then the value of the Biriba is halved, i.e. 150 points.

Hiliara: A hiliara (Greek for "thousand") consists of every suited consecutive card from Ace to King (or Ace to Two if the Ace is placed after the King). This set is worth 1,000 points. However, if it is dirtied then it is considered a Pentakosara (Greek for "five hundred") and it is worth 500 points. (see Venezuelan Version at the end of the Greek directions)

Set Variations: In some variations of the game, a hiliara or pentakosara are only worth their regular biriba points (200 or 100, respectively). Other variations only award the same 200 points for sets of like-numbers (e.g. seven threes). Downplaying points from specific sets changes the game to be more fast-paced, as it encourages players to meld cards quickly rather than rewarding long strategies that require many specific cards. As a result, players "show their hands" earlier, which is the only way to communicate strategies to partners while also forcing opponents to be mindful of the cards they discard.

=== Atout ===
The suit of the first revealed card becomes the "atout" suit (in case of a joker, the receiving player may choose a suit or declare no-trump.) A clean biriba is formed with this suit is worth 600 points rather than 200; a dirty atout biriba is halved to 300 points. This presents a focus both for aggressive and defensive play; atout cards (especially the middle cards, 7 through 10,) are rarely voluntarily discarded, and all atout cards are guarded if an opponent is suspected of collecting them or nearing completion of a biriba. The rare hiliara biriba is still 1000 points (no extra points).

=== Vulnerability ===
If a player or team starts a round past a certain points threshold they may not lay down cards until the total of the first play surpasses a certain points value: for a score between 1000 - 1499 the played sets must be worth at least 75 points, and between 1500 - 2999 points the restriction is raised to 90 points.

=== Card values ===
After all the points from the sets are added (or subtracted if necessary), the points of each individual cards are added to the total score. Each card is assigned a numerical point as follows.

Card	Value
Joker	20
Ace	15
K, Q, J, 10, 9, 8, 2	10
7, 6, 5, 4, 3	5

Suits have no effect on the point value of each card.

Biriba has so many variations that even the point system varies by a factor of 10. Below the non-decimal points are used as they are deemed more convenient. See below.

=== Bonus and penalty points ===
If a player manages to discard their paketo then the round ends and they get a bonus of 100 points. Everyone else is penalized by adding the points of the cards they have in hands. If a player has not progressed to the biribakia, being still in the first hand, they are penalized another 100 points (in the case that the round ends after a player has acquired a Biribaki, but before he or she has had a chance to play the hand, the total penalty is 100 points for the un-played hand, regardless of the point totals of the cards contained within). If the players run out of cards all points must be tallied. If either player has not received their respective biribakia, each player is penalized 100 points. The last player is the one to pick up the final card from the deck.

== Variations ==
=== Three-handed Biriba ===
The game is the same as for four players, with the following differences:

- The first biribaki consists of 18 cards, the second of 11.
- The one who "closes" first, and takes the first biribaki, has the other two players as a team against them for the hand. The two other players share equally their points.

=== Six-handed Biriba ===
The game is the same as for four players, three teams partners sitting opposite.

== Venezuelan version of Biriba ==
=== Object ===
Be the first to earn 2500 points

=== Base points ===
Play	Points
Wild Card (all Jokers and/or Wild 2's) in hand	1000 points
Wild Card (all Jokers and/or Wild 2's) accumulated	750 points
Aces clean and in hand	500 points
Aces dirty and in hand	400 points
Aces clean accumulated	400 points
Aces dirty accumulated	300 points
Run/set clean in hand	300 points
Run/set dirty in hand	200 points
Run/set clean accumulated	200 points
Run/set dirty accumulated	100 points
Going out/ending the round	100 points
Exact deal	100 points
+ or – one card on the deal	50 points

=== Card values ===
Card	Value
Joker	50
2	25
Ace	20
K, Q, J, 10, 9, 8	10
7, 6, 5, 4, 3	5

A Biriba is a group of at least 7 cards consisting of:

- Runs - must be of the same suit - A, 2, 3, 4, 5, 6, 7, 8, 9, 10, J, Q, K, A.
- Sets – same value card (all 3's; all 4's; all 5's... all J's; all Q's; all K's; all A's).
- Wild Card Biriba – consists of Jokers and Wild 2's.

If a wild card is added to a clean Biriba, the value of the Biriba drops to that of a dirty Biriba.

=== Non-partnership game (2-3 players) ===
==== The Deal ====
To determine the first dealer, the players take turns cutting the deck. The player to cut at the highest-ranking card (excluding Wild's and 2's) is the first dealer.

The dealer cuts from the bottom of the deck, attempting to cut from the bottom the exact number of cards that equals 11 cards per player, plus the one card which is placed face up next to the draw deck. The dealer hands this portion of the deck to the player to their left.

The dealer turns over the remaining top portion of the deck and looks only at the bottom three cards, being careful not to reveal the fourth card from the bottom. If any of the three cards is a Joker or Wild 2, the dealer gets the card(s). The dealer continues to check the cards at the bottom of the pile until the three cards at the bottom of the deck are not Jokers or Wild 2's. Any Jokers and/or Wild 2's found in this process become part of the dealer's first hand of a total of 11 cards.

The player to whom the dealer handed the cards then deals the first hand of cards for the round. If the dealer cut exactly, the dealer gets 100 points; if the dealer is + or – one card, the dealer gets 50 points. If the dealer found any Jokers or Wild 2's at the bottom of the deck, these are counted as part of his/her first hand of a total of 11 cards. (Example: If three players and the dealer found two Jokers/Wild 2's in the bottom three cards, the deal of the first hand of 11 cards consists of 11 cards each for the two non-dealers and 9 cards for the dealer. If the cut from the bottom of the original deck was exactly 11+11+9+1, or 32 cards, then the dealer gets 100 base points; if either 31 or 33 cards, the dealer was off one card and gets 50 base points.).

The dealer then deals the Biriba piles (cards used for the second hand of cards for the round) consisting of 11 cards for each player. These cards are set aside for use after the first round of cards.

==== The play ====
The first hand of the round:

1. The third player (or the dealer, if only two players) makes the first play.
  - The player may choose to pick up the entire pile of face up cards or choose one card from the face down remaining cards
  - The player must discard one card
2. Going clockwise, each player takes a turn
3. The goal of the first hand is to be able to use every card in the player's hand
  - Groups of at least 3 cards (the base for any Biriba, or group of 7 or more cards)
  - Groups of cards may include no more than one wild/2 card
  - If a group of wild cards are played, then the player may not use a wild card in any group of cards until the Wild Card Biriba is complete
4. If the player is able to lay down all cards except one, the one remaining card becomes the discard, and the player's turn is over.
5. If the player is able to lay down all cards on the table (with no discard), the player picks up his/her Biriba pile and continues the Biriba hand.
6. Once a card is no longer touching a player's physical fingers or hand, that card is considered played, and may not be retrieved.

==== The Biriba hand ====
The player picks up the Biriba pile

If the player did not have a discard when laying down the first round of cards, the player continues to play until he/she discards

The round ends when a player:

- Has used all cards and goes out with or without a discard
- Has at least one Biriba (completed group of 7 or more cards)

The points for each player are tallied, with the points in hand counted against the player(s) who did not end the round. The point tally includes the base points, and the card value points.

==== The next round(s) ====
The player to the left of the dealer, then becomes the dealer and cuts the cards

The game continues until a player has 2500 points at the end of a round

If two or more players have at least 2500 points at the end of a round, the player with the highest total score is the winner.

=== Partners Game (4 Players) ===
==== Partners ====
The players chose partners; Team A and Team B

The partners sit opposite each other such that turns are taken by alternating team members

==== The Deal ====
To determine the first dealer, the players take turns cutting the deck. The player to cut with the highest card (excluding Wild's and 2's) is the first dealer.

The dealer cuts from the bottom of the deck, attempting to cut from the bottom the exact number of cards that equals 11 cards per player, plus one card which is placed face up next to the draw deck.

The dealer hands those cards to the player on his/her left. That player then deals the first hand of cards for the round. If the dealer cut exactly, the dealer gets 100 points for his/her team; if the dealer is + or – one card, the dealer gets 50 points for his/her team.

The dealer then deals the Biriba piles (cards used for the second hand of cards for the round) consisting of 2 piles of 11 cards. These cards are set aside for use after the first round of cards.

==== The Play ====
The first hand of the round:

- The third player makes the first play.
- Play continues the same as for a 2-3 player game, until one member of the team lays down his/her first hand

==== The Biriba hand ====
The player picks up the Biriba pile If the player did not have a discard when laying down the first round of cards, the player continues to play until he/she discards

When it is the turn of the team member of the player who has laid down his/her first round of cards the player plays as if the first round of cards laid on the table are his/her and adds to those cards to assist in completed a Biriba, and lays down as many other cards that can be used

The round is over when a player on a team:

- Has used all cards and goes out with or without a discard
- The team has at least one Biriba (completed group of 7 or more cards)

The points for each player are tallied, with the points in hand counted against the player(s) who did not end the round.

==== The next round(s) ====
The player to the left of the dealer, then becomes the dealer and cuts the cards. The game continues until a player has 2500 points at the end of a round. If two or more players have at least 2500 points at the end of a round, the player with the highest total score is the winner.

== See also ==
- Desmoche
- Buraco
