= Millie (disambiguation) =

Millie is a feminine given name (the article includes a list of people and fictional characters with the given name).

Mille may also refer to:

- Millie (dog), the pet of Barbara and George H. W. Bush
- Millie (film), a 1931 Hollywood film
- "Millie" (short story), by Katherine Mansfield, 1913
- The Sun Military Awards, known as "Millies"
- Millie, a variant of card game Miss Milligan
- Millie, a character in the 2009 American romantic comedy-drama movie 500 Days of Summer
- Millie, the German name for the village of Miliieve, Chernivtsi oblast, Ukraine

== See also ==
- Mille (disambiguation)
- Milli (disambiguation)
- Millia (disambiguation)
- Milly (disambiguation)
- Jeanne Scelles-Millie (1900–1993), born Jeanne Millie, French architectural engineer and author
