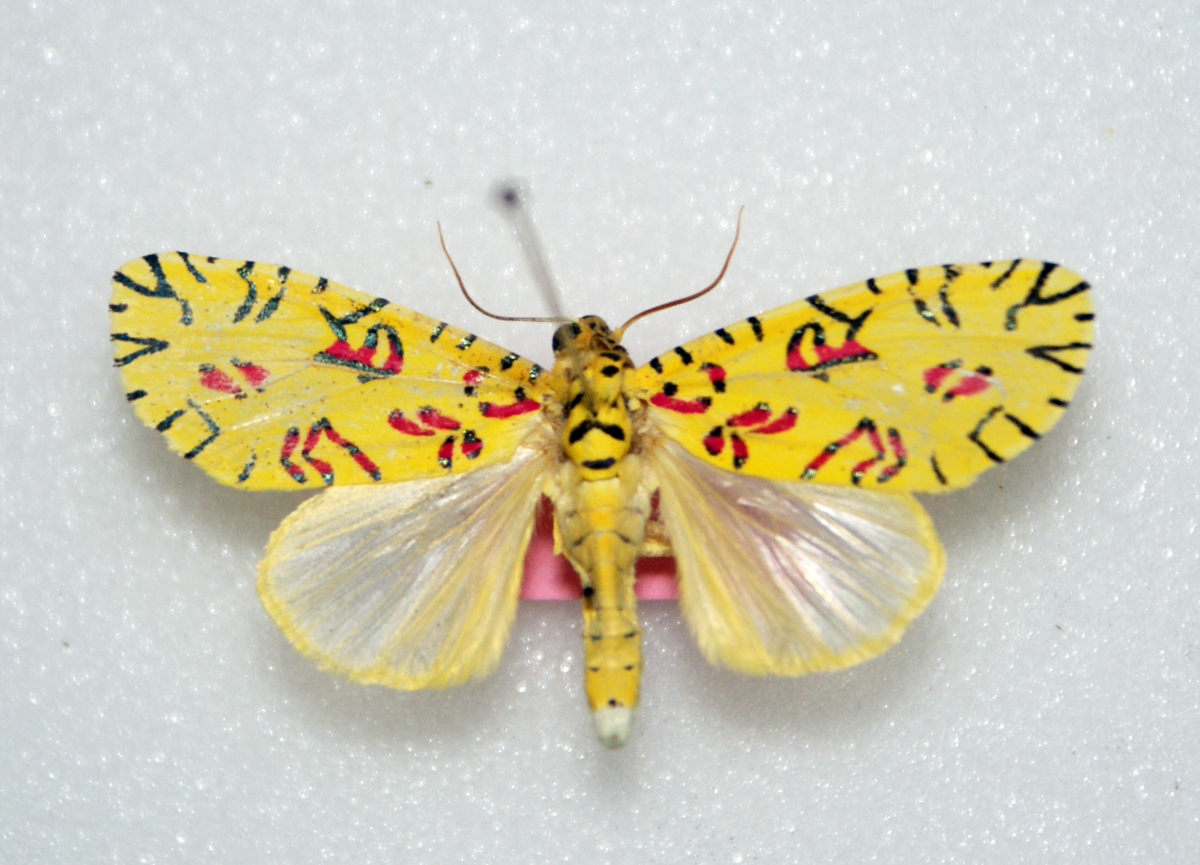
- Mazuca strigicincta, the Pikachu moth

Scientific classification
- Kingdom: Animalia
- Phylum: Arthropoda
- Class: Insecta
- Order: Lepidoptera
- Superfamily: Noctuoidea
- Family: Noctuidae
- Tribe: Psaphidini
- Genus: Mazuca; Walker, 1866

Synonyms
- Mila Aurivillius, 1892

= Mazuca =

Genus of moths

Mazuca is a genus of moths of the family Noctuidae found in Sub-Saharan Africa. The genus was erected by Francis Walker in 1866.

== Species ==
- Mazuca amoena Jordan, 1933 Zaire
- Mazuca dulcis Jordan, 1933 Nigeria
- Mazuca elegantissima Janse, 1930 southern Africa
- Mazuca haemagrapha Hampson, 1910 Ghana
- Mazuca roseistriga Fletcher, 1963 Malawi
- Mazuca strigicincta Walker, 1866 Nigeria, Cameroons, Malawi – Pikachu moth
