= Lilian, Virginia =

Unincorporated community in Virginia, US

Coordinates: 37°51′42″N 76°17′59″W

Lilian is an unincorporated community in Northumberland County, in the U.S. state of Virginia.
