= Gilten (card game) =

Austrian card game

- Tyrol's national card game
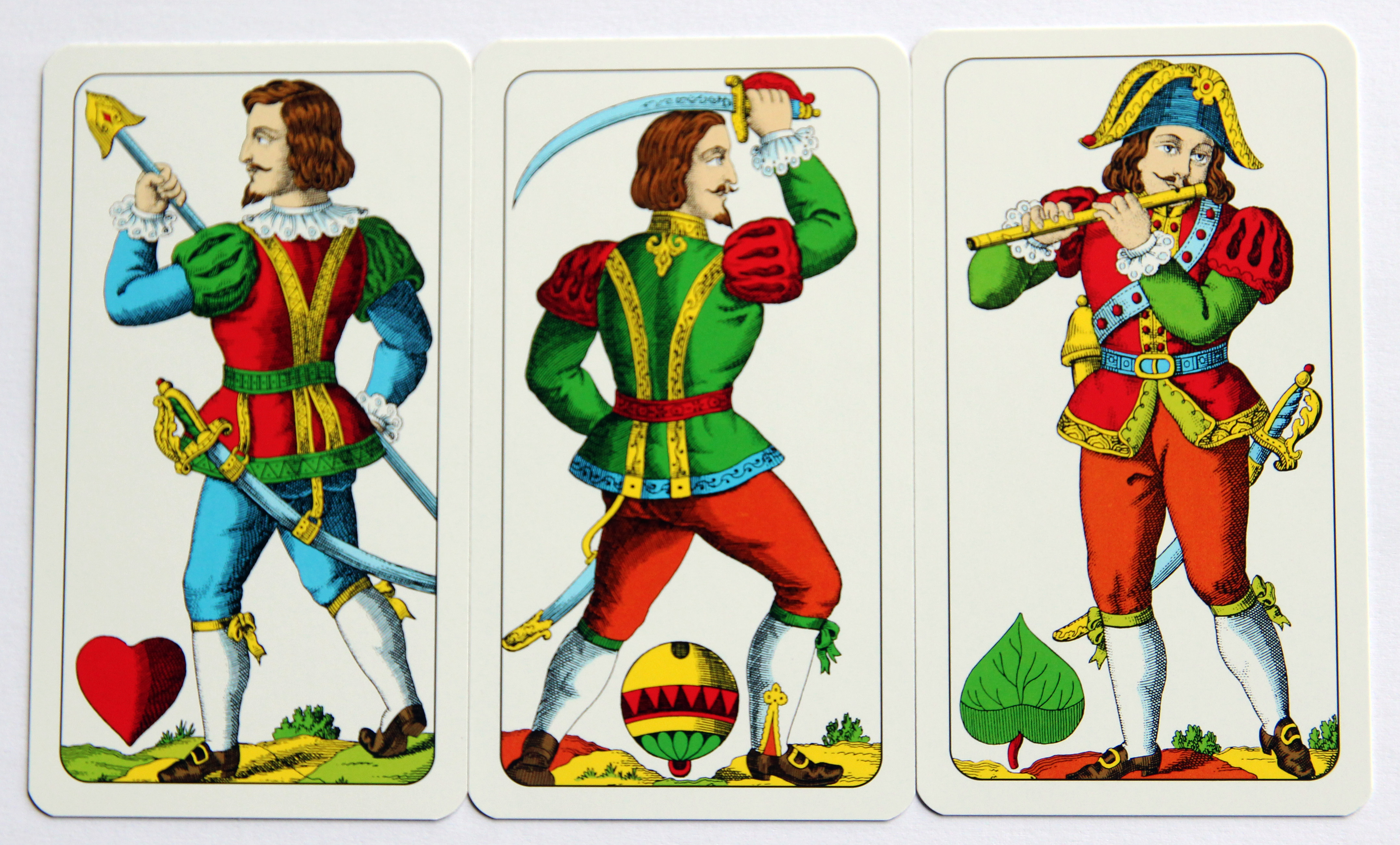
- A Gleich of 3 Unters
- Origin: Austria, South Tyrol
- Alternative names: Giltspiel
- Type: Plain-trick
- Players: 4 (2 x 2)
- Cards: 32
- Deck: German-suited, Salzburg pattern cards
- Play: Clockwise

Related games
- Bieten, Perlaggen

Gilten or Giltspiel is a "very old" Austrian card game for four players, playing in partnership, with 32 German-suited cards of the William Tell pattern. Despite its age, it is still played locally in parts of Austria today. It is a trick-taking game which involves betting on the outcome and certain card combinations.

== History ==
Gilten is ancestral to the renowned Tyrolean game of Perlaggen, which itself has earned UNESCO heritage status. Its age is indicated in an 1853 book on Perlaggen which states that "Giltspiel has been played for as long as anyone can remember". However, detailed rules were not published until 2015 when research by Hubert Auer discovered it still being played regularly in Fiss, Serfaus and Ladis in the upper Inn valley (south of Landeck) and added the rules to his book, Watten, Bieten & Perlaggen.

The name comes from the expression Gilt's... as in "Gilt's Hanger?" ("is the Hanger valid?") or "Gilt's Spiel?" ("is the Spiel valid?") which was formerly used in betting.

== Cards ==
Players use the standard German-suited pack found in most of Austria and referred to as the Tell pattern by the International Playing-Card Society. This comprises 32 cards ranking from 7 to Deuce (Ace) in the suits of Acorns (Eichel), Leaves (Laub), Hearts (Herz) and Bells (Schell).

== Preliminaries ==
Four players form two teams of two, the aim being to be first to score 11 (or 15) points. Deal and play are clockwise. The dealer shuffles and offers the pack to the right for cutting, deals five cards each in two rounds of 2+3 or 3+2 and turns the next for trump.

== Play ==
Forehand (left of dealer) leads to the first trick. Players must either follow suit or play a trump. (Note: In other words, the rules of play are the same as in all fours, as opposed to the far more common whist rules.) Thus a trump may always be played even if a player could follow suit. If unable to follow suit, a player may play any card. The trick is won by the highest trump or by the highest card of the led suit if no trumps were played. The trick winner leads to the next trick.

Cards are not played to the middle of the table as is usual; instead a played card is placed face up in front of the player and to the right of any previously played.

Points are scored for 'figures' known as Gleich, Hanger and Spiel ("game") as follows:

- Gleich. A set of two or more equal-ranking cards held by one player. The player with the best Gleich wins 1 point for his team. A quartet beats a triplet which, in turn, beats a pair. A higher ranking set beats a lower ranking one of the same length. If teams have equal ranking pairs, "the Gleich stands" (Der Gleich steht) and no point is scored.
- Hanger. A sequence of at least two consecutive cards in the same suit held by one player. The player with the best Hanger wins the point for his or her team. A longer sequence beats a shorter one and a higher ranking sequence beats a lower one of the same length. If both teams have Hangers of equal value, "the Hanger stands" (Der Hanger steht) and no point is scored.
- Spiel. The team taking at least three of the five available tricks scores the point for Spiel i.e. "game".

A single card may be used in both a Gleich and a Hanger.

== Betting ==
Each figure is initially worth 1 point, but this may be increased by betting during the play. Teams may bet on each figure, alternately, at any time once the cards are dealt. This is done by saying "I bet on the [figure]" (Ich biete das [Figur]). The opposing team may concede with "good" (gut), "hold" or "see" (halten, anschauen) to accept an increase of 1 point, or raise by saying the next higher number of points e.g. "three". If they raise, the other team must respond likewise. Players bet and respond on behalf of their team and either may do so. Bets may increase alternately up to 7 points, after which the next team to raise declares "game out" (Spiel aus). If accepted, the team that wins the figure wins the whole game (11 or 15 points as decided). If "game out" is conceded, 7 points are scored.

== Show ==
As soon as the figure for Spiel is decided, play stops even in mid-trick. If Gleich and/or Hanger are undecided, there is a so-called 'show' in which the team winning the Spiel goes first by conceding the figure, revealing cards to at least the same value as the opponent has shown or bet on the figure (if unbet or it is their turn).

== Scoring ==
Points are recorded on a scoresheet and the first team to reach the target score is the winner.

== Signalling ==
Signalling between partners is permitted, but cards may not be shown. Signals are agreed with one's partner beforehand, but in practice a common signalling scheme is used.

== Literature ==
- Das Tiroler National- oder Perlagg-Spiel. Innsbruck: Wagner. 1853.
- Auer, Hubert (2015). Watten, Bieten und Perlaggen. Vol. 659. Vienna: Perlen-Reihe. ISBN 3852234336.
- Förderkreis Perlaggen Südtirol. Perlåggen in Südtirol mit Watten & Bieten. Bozen: Raetia (2014). ISBN 978-88-7283-523-4
- Schwaighofer, Hermann. Die Tiroler Kartenspiele Bieten, Watten, Perlaggen. Innsbruck: Wagner (1926), 95 pp.
