= Eichelbaum =

Eichelbaum is a German surname meaning "acorn tree". Notable people with the surname include:

- Danny Eichelbaum (born 1973), German politician
- Samuel Eichelbaum (1894–1967), Argentine playwright
- Thomas Eichelbaum (1931–2018), New Zealand jurist and Chief Justice of New Zealand
- Pearl Leah Eichelbaum (1857-1934) married to Benjamin Wonsal (1857-1935), mother of the four Warner brothers, Harry, Albert, Sam and Jack

== See also ==
- Eichel (disambiguation)
