= Militaire =

Bespoke card game of the Rummy family

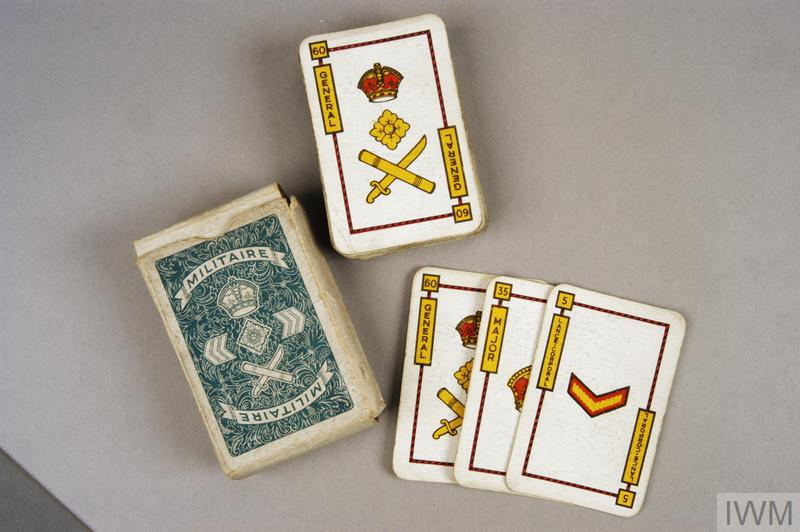
Militaire Army Card Game pack and cards at the Imperial War Museum

Militaire was a bespoke card game of the Rummy family for three or four players in which the playing cards depicted badges of rank of the British Army. According to the Imperial War Museum it dates to the interwar period or Second World War, while other sources suggest it was made in the 1940s and 1950s. (Note: It may be that the smaller version was made later, since the sources that date the cards to the 1940s and 1950s relate to that version only.) It came in two sizes: a standard size in an ordinary box and a pocket sized version in a cardboard wallet. The game is no longer manufactured.

== History ==
In 1953 the Tudor Crown (above) was replaced on rank badges by the St Edward's Crown (below)

According to the Imperial War Museum, its standard pack of cards (pictured) dates to the interwar period or Second World War and may have been played in the trenches. There were leather boxed sets for the officers and paper boxes for other ranks. Meanwhile the pocket version dates to the 1940s. The cardmaker is unknown. The design of the officers' rank badges on both versions suggests a period of 1928-1953, since the rank of brigadier was not established until 1928 and the insignia depict Tudor Crowns which were changed in 1953 to the Crown of St. Edward, when Queen Elizabeth II adopted a stylised image of the crown for use in coats of arms, badges, logos and various other insignia..

== Description ==
The standard game of Militaire was played with a 54-card pack comprising cards each portraying a rank badge of the British Army and a card value in points. There were 4 cards each of all the officer ranks - General (60 points), Brigadier (50), Colonel (45), Lieutenant Colonel (40), Major (35), Captain (30), Lieutenant (25) and 2nd Lieutenant (20) - and 7 cards each of the Other Ranks: Sergeant (15), Corporal (10) and Lance Corporal (5). (Note: Card values in points are given in brackets after the rank.) In addition, there was a single card depicting the rank of Sergeant Major (5 – 60 points) which acted as a wild card or 'master card'.

The pocket version of Militaire only had 40 cards: 3 of each officer rank, 5 of each other rank and 1 sergeant major wild card. The rules were the same, except that sets of 4 were only possible with the cards depicting the badges of other ranks. The patience-sized cards measure 70 x 45 mm, whereas the standard cards measure 85 x 56 mm.

== Rules ==
The game was designed for three or four players; two packs were to be used if there were five or more. Deal and play were clockwise. Players cut for first dealer and then 7 cards were dealt to each player. The remainder were stacked face down in the middle of the table and the top card turned and placed beside the stock to start the discard pile.

The aim was to form sets of 3 or 4 cards of the same rank or runs of at least 3 cards in rank sequence.

Eldest hand began by drawing the upcard or the top card of the stock and then discarding a card to the discard pile. On completing a valid set or run, a player could meld it to the table, face up, and score points based on the card values. The first player to expose a complete hand of 2 sets or a run and a set or a run of 6-7 cards won and scored the following bonus points in addition to the card points:

- Set of 3 - 30 points
- Set of 4 - 40 points
- Run of 3 - 10 points
- Run of 4 - 20 points
- Run of 6 - 50 points
- Run of 7 - 100 points

If the seventh card was unused, the holder incurred penalty points to its value. Other players only scored the value of sets or runs they meld to the table. Scores were kept on a cribbage-style scoring board.

Players could play an agreed number of deals, known as a "rubber".

== Variant ==
The rules described a variant played for stakes by four or more players in which a discarded card not immediately picked up by the following player could be bid for by the remainder and exchanged for any hand card; the winning bidder paying the amount of the bid to the pool which was taken by the winner of the rubber.

== See also ==
- British Army officer rank insignia
- British Army other ranks rank insignia
