= Jaggln =

Historical Tyrolean card game

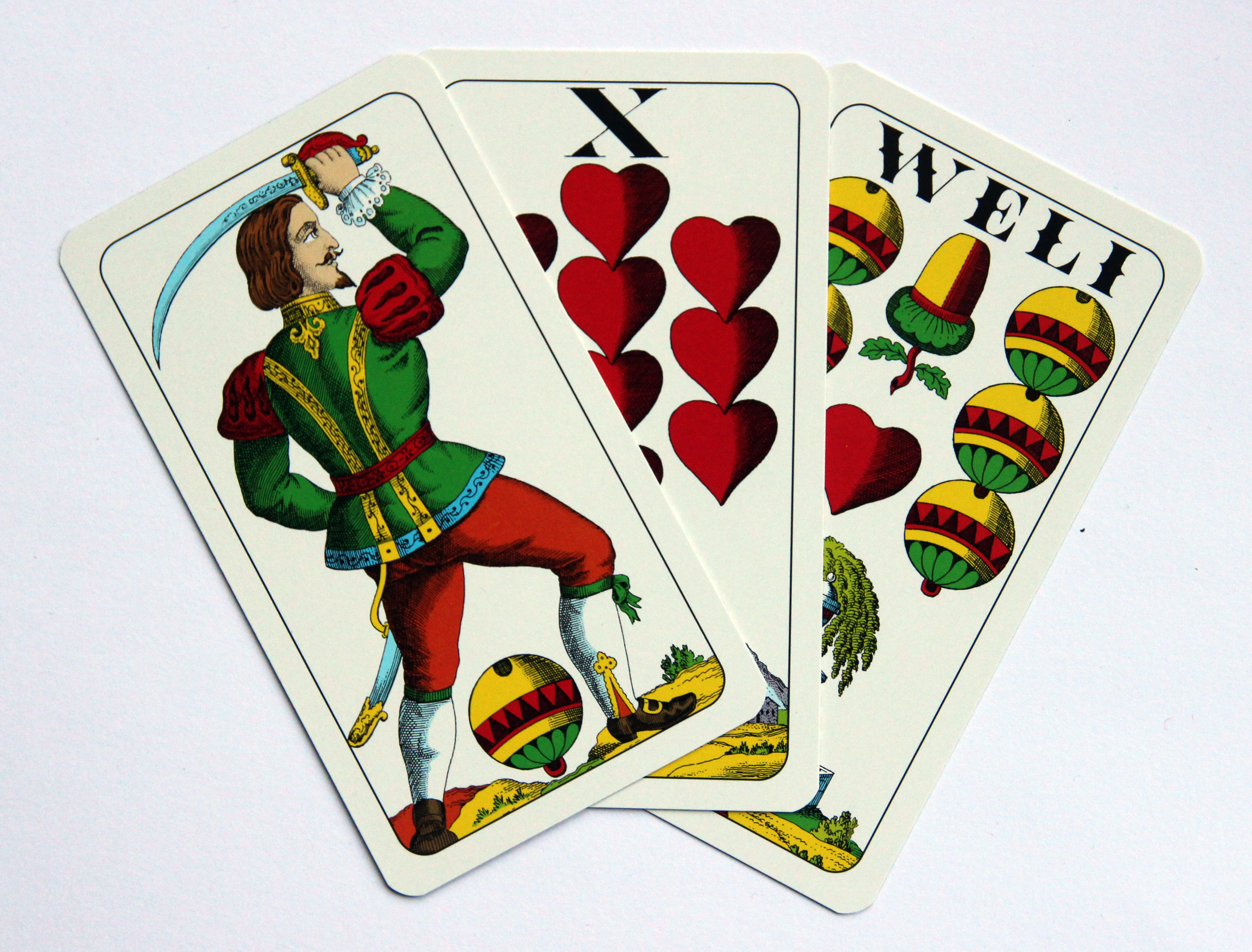
- The top trumps: Jaggl, Zanggl and Buggl
- Origin: Germany
- Alternative names: Jaggeln
- Type: Plain-trick
- Family: Trump group
- Players: 5
- Cards: 33
- Deck: William Tell
- Rank (high→low): U 10 6 S (10) K O (U) 9 8 7
- Play: Clockwise

Jaggln or Jaggeln is an historical Tyrolean card game designed for five players that used to be played purely as a winter pastime by farming folk. An unusual feature are its three highest trumps known as Jaggl, Zanggl and Buggl. The aim is to win the majority of Gewisses – i.e. the four Sows, the four Tens and the Jaggl. So, for example, if a player holds all three top trumps, he is certain to win 3 tricks. And if, in doing so, he captures the four Sows, he has won because he has five of the nine Gewisses.

== Overview ==
Hailing from the Brixental valley in Austria, Jaggln is an almost-forgotten, East Tyrolean card game which was described in 1938 by Schipflinger as "very special", its rules having been "passed from generation to generation only by word of mouth". Schipflinger recounted that it was played "when the long winter evenings draw in [and] it is not possible to work outside for as long as in summer. You do not want to go to bed immediately after the rosary [evening prayer]; you want entertainment [and] the best and most popular card game is Jaggln." It was a social game played between neighbours from just after Christmas to March.

Today the game is still played in some places in the region and courses have been held to teach it.

The name of the top trump, Jaggl, is a Tyrolean forename and means Jacob.

== Rules ==
The following rules are based on the game as described by Schipflinger:

=== Aim ===
Jaggln is a partnership game in which the aim is to win at least five of the nine Gewisses (Gwiß). The Gewisses are the four Sows (actually Deuces, but sometimes erroneously called Aces), four Tens and the Jaggl (the Unter of Bells).

=== Players ===
Jaggln is a game for five or six players. If seven play, the dealer sits out.

=== Cards ===
Acorns (Eichel)	Leaves (Laub)	Hearts (Herz)	Bells (Schell)

Jaggln is played with a Single German (Salzburg) pack comprising four suits – Acorns, Leaves, Hearts and Bells – and 33 cards i.e. the Sow to Seven in each suit plus the Six of Bells or Buggl.

Jaggln has three permanent top trumps which are always part of the trump suit and do not belong to their natural suit. They are the:

- U – the Jaggl, (Note: Jaggl is an Austrian dialect pet name for "Jacob") which also counts as a Gewiss.
- 10 – the Zanggl or Waxbock, naturally a Gewiss
- 6 – the Buggl (Note: Buggl is an Austrian dialect word for Buckel (a hump or a rounded object, perhaps referring to the shape of the bells) or Welli.)

Next in rank are the cards of the trump suit as follows: Sow (Deuce) > (Ten) > King > Ober > (Unter) > Nine > Eight > Seven. The plain suits rank in the same order.

=== Playing ===
Jaggln is best played by 5 players, but 6 or 7 can play too. If five play, deal six cards each; if six play, deal five cards each. With seven players, each takes it in turn to sit out. Three cards are dealt, face down, as the doaba, or talon, in the middle of the table.

The declarer (forehand), chooses a partner by calling for a card; the player with that card is his partner and they then play against all the others. The called card determines the trump suit, for example:

- If the Jaggl is called, Bells are trumps.
- If the Zanggl is called, Hearts are trumps.
- If the Buggl is called, Acorns are trumps.
- If the Sow of Leaves (Laubsau) is called, Leaves are trumps

If the called card happens to be in the doaba, then the declarer must play a solo. After making his announcement, the declarer may pick up the doaba and keep any of the cards, but must discard the same number. He may not discard any Sows or Tens.

The declarer leads to the first trick. Thereafter, the winner of a trick leads to the next. The team that captures at least five of the nine Gewisses (Sows, Tens and the Jaggl) has won. Players must follow suit if possible, otherwise they may trump or play any card. There is no compulsion to head the trick.

If the declarer's team wins, the three losers each pay 2 cents (Note: The original says "2 groschen", but Austria now has the euro.) to the two winners, who thus receive 3 cents each. If the declarer's team loses, they both pay 3 cents to the three defenders, who thus receive 2 cents each.

If the losers fail to win a trick they are 'in the mud' (gematscht) and usually have to pay double.

== Variant ==
A variant published by the Tschitscher "Gaming and Reading Hotel" (Spiele- und Buchhotel) has been recorded by Heidi and Dieter Mayr-Hassler and checked by specialists at the Vienna Games Academy. Differences or clarifications are:

- 28 cards from a William Tell pack are used. All Sevens, the 8 and all Sixes apart from the Weli are removed.
- The 'counters' (Gewisse) score 10 points each, otherwise the aim is the same.
- The second-highest trump is the Ace of trumps.
- The cutter may take the U (Mandl) and/or 6 (Weli) if they are the bottom cards of the top packet.
- Five to "any number" may play, but only five are active at any one time. If six play, the dealer sits out; if seven play, the player after the dealer also sits out and so on. (Note: The practical maximum is nine players because, if there are ten, a second table can be formed.)
- If five play, only five cards are dealt to each player.
- Forehand chooses a partner by calling for any card apart from the Mandl.
- The declarer may choose to play with the talon (doaba) or not. If not, the game value is doubled and the talon cards belong to his opponents. If he uses the talon he must discard 3 cards.
- Scoring: if the declaring team loses, the declarer pays 2 chips and his partner 1 chip to their opponents (with 5 players each opponent gets 1 chip). If the declaring side win, the losers each pay a chip to the winners, the declarer getting 2 and his partner 1 chip. Payments are doubled when playing without the talon. If a team fails to win a trick they are 'washed out' (waschtln) and payments are doubled, or quadrupled if the talon was not used.

== Literature ==
- Geiser, Remigius (2004). "100 Kartenspiele des Landes Salzburg" (PDF). Talon (13). Archived from the original (PDF) on 27 August 2018.
- Schipflinger, Anton (1938). "Das Jaggln". Tiroler Heimatblätter (7/8). Archived from the original on 7 December 2024.
- Traxler, Franz (2002). "Das Jaggln" in Sagen, Bräuche und Geschichten aus dem Brixental und seiner näheren Umgebung. Wagner, Innsbruck. ISBN 978-3-7030-0921-1
