= Teltow-Fläming I =

State electoral district of Germany

23: Teltow-Fläming I
- Electoral district for the Landtag of Brandenburg
- Teltow-Fläming I in 2024
- District: Teltow-Fläming
- Electorate: 48,996 (2024)
- Major settlements: Ludwigsfelde and Trebbin

Current electoral district
- Created: 1994
- Party: SPD
- Member: Marcel Penquitt

Teltow-Fläming I is an electoral constituency (German: Wahlkreis) represented in the Landtag of Brandenburg. It elects one member via first-past-the-post voting. Under the constituency numbering system, it is designated as constituency 23. It is located in within the district of Teltow-Fläming.

== Geography ==
The constituency includes the towns of Ludwigsfelde and Trebbin, as well as the communities of Am Mellensee, Großbeeren, and Nuthe-Urstromtal.

There were 48,996 eligible voters in 2024.

== Members ==
Election	Member	Party	%
2004	Klaus Bochow	SPD	30.0
2009	Klaus Bochow	SPD	32.8
2014	Helmut Barthel	SPD	33.1
2019	Helmut Barthel	SPD	28.8
2024	Marcel Penquitt	SPD	36.8

== Election results ==
=== 2024 election ===
State election (2024): Teltow-Fläming I
Notes:	Blue background denotes the winner of the electorate vote. Pink background denotes a candidate elected from their party list. Yellow background denotes an electorate win by a list member, or other incumbent. A ✓ or ✗ denotes status of any incumbent, win or lose respectively.						
Party	Candidate	Votes	%	±%	Party votes	%	±%
SPD	Marcel Penquitt	13,142	36.7	▲7.9	12,081	33.6	▲5.5
AfD	Lion Edler	10,328	28.9	▲7.5	9,483	26.4	▲4.7
CDU	Danny Eichelbaum	6,697	18.7	▲0.6	5,030	14.0	▼2.3
BSW					4,395	12.2	
BVB/FW	Wylegalla	2,630	7.4	▼1.1	929	2.6	▼2.8
APT					886	2.5	▼0.8
Left	Lübbert	1,476	4.1	▼5.1	836	2.3	▼6.5
Greens	Borchert	939	2.6	▼7.4	1,316	3.7	▼6.9
FDP	Lietsch	564	1.6	▼2.3	344	1.0	▼3.2
Plus					302	0.8	▼0.8
DLW					171	0.5	
Values					146	0.4	
Third Way					43	0.1	
DKP					23	0.1	
Informal votes		476			267		
Total valid votes		35,776			35,985		
Turnout		36,252	74.0	▲12.4			
SPD hold	Majority	2,814	7.8	▲0.4			

=== 2019 election ===
State election (2019): Teltow-Fläming I
Notes:	Blue background denotes the winner of the electorate vote. Pink background denotes a candidate elected from their party list. Yellow background denotes an electorate win by a list member, or other incumbent. A ✓ or ✗ denotes status of any incumbent, win or lose respectively.						
Party	Candidate	Votes	%	±%	Party votes	%	±%
SPD	✓ Helmut Barthel	8,299	28.8	▼4.3	8,103	28.1	▼5.5
AfD	Dietmar Ertel	6,158	21.4	▲8.6	6,235	21.6	▲8.9
CDU	Danny Eichelbaum	5,227	18.1	▼4.8	4,689	16.2	▼5.8
Greens	Ruth Wagner	2,899	10.1	▲4.6	3,043	10.5	▲5.2
Left	Silvio Pape	2,660	9.2	▼8.0	2,553	8.8	▼7.9
BVB/FW	Jens Wylegalla	2,434	8.5	▲2.8	1,553	5.4	▲1.3
FDP	Jacqueline Krüger	1,127	3.9	▲1.2	1,211	4.2	▲2.5
Tierschutzpartei					931	3.2	
Pirates					268	0.9	▼0.7
ÖDP					207	0.7	
V-Partei3					65	0.2	
Informal votes		412			358		
Total valid votes		28,804			28,858		
Turnout		29,216	61.6	▲15.0			
SPD hold	Majority	2,141	7.4	▼2.8			

=== 2014 election ===
State election (2014): Telton-Fläming I
Notes:	Blue background denotes the winner of the electorate vote. Pink background denotes a candidate elected from their party list. Yellow background denotes an electorate win by a list member, or other incumbent. A ✓ or ✗ denotes status of any incumbent, win or lose respectively.						
Party	Candidate	Votes	%	±%	Party votes	%	±%
SPD	Helmut Barthel	6,936	33.1	▲0.3	7,068	33.6	▼2.3
CDU	Danny Eichelbaum	4,805	22.9	▲0.9	4,635	22.0	▲2.2
Left	Norbert Müller	3,604	17.2	▼9.3	3,516	16.7	▼7.7
AfD	Birgit Bessin	2,680	12.8		2,682	12.7	
BVB/FW	Erich Ertl	1,204	5.7	▲3.4	869	4.1	▲2.5
Greens	Ruth Wagner	1,162	5.5	▲0.3	1,119	5.3	▲0.1
FDP	Martina Borgwardt	571	2.7	▼5.2	367	1.7	▼6.5
Pirates					330	1.6	
NPD					351	1.7	▼0.5
REP					66	0.3	▲0.1
DKP					33	0.2	▲0.1
Informal votes		472			398		
Total valid votes		20,962			21,036		
Turnout		21,434	46.6	▼21.9			
SPD hold	Majority	2,131	10.2	▲3.9			

=== 2009 election ===
State election (2009): Telton-Fläming I
Notes:	Blue background denotes the winner of the electorate vote. Pink background denotes a candidate elected from their party list. Yellow background denotes an electorate win by a list member, or other incumbent. A ✓ or ✗ denotes status of any incumbent, win or lose respectively.						
Party	Candidate	Votes	%	±%	Party votes	%	±%
SPD	✓ Klaus Bochow	9,925	32.8	▲2.8	10,919	35.9	▲1.3
Left	Peter Dunkel	8,033	26.5	▼2.5	7,443	24.4	▼0.1
CDU	Danny Eichelbaum	6,674	22.0	▼3.1	6,028	19.8	▼0.3
FDP	Martina Borgwardt	2,406	7.9	▲1.7	2,509	8.2	▲4.4
Greens	Thomas Czesky	1,563	5.2	▲1.0	1,587	5.2	▲1.9
NPD	Michael Thalheim	809	2.7		675	2.2	
BVB/FW	Erich Ertl	699	2.3		502	1.6	
DVU					288	0.9	▼4.9
RRP					171	0.6	
Independent	Josef Lange	160	0.5				
50Plus					143	0.5	▼0.4
Die-Volksinitiative					91	0.3	
REP					61	0.2	
DKP					30	0.1	Steady
Informal votes		964			786		
Total valid votes		30,269			30,447		
Turnout		31,233	68.5	▲11.6			
SPD hold	Majority	1,892	6.3	▲5.3			

=== 2004 election ===
State election (2004): Teltow-Fläming I
Notes:	Blue background denotes the winner of the electorate vote. Pink background denotes a candidate elected from their party list. Yellow background denotes an electorate win by a list member, or other incumbent. A ✓ or ✗ denotes status of any incumbent, win or lose respectively.						
Party	Candidate	Votes	%	±%	Party votes	%	±%
SPD	Klaus Bochow	7,309	30.00		8,517	34.58	
PDS	Peter Dunkel	7,066	29.00		6,040	24.52	
CDU	Gertrud Klatt	6,113	25.09		4,946	20.08	
DVU					1,418	5.76	
FDP	Wolfgang Paul	1,506	6.18		928	3.77	
AfW (Free Voters)	Jasmin Kunze	1,338	5.49		222	0.90	
Greens	Sandra Braun-Grüneberg	1,032	4.24		821	3.33	
Familie					776	3.15	
AUB-Brandenburg					278	1.13	
Gray Panthers					225	0.91	
50Plus					220	0.89	
BRB					97	0.39	
Yes Brandenburg					69	0.28	
Schill					41	0.17	
DKP					30	0.12	
Informal votes		779			515		
Total valid votes		24,364			24,628		
Turnout		25,143	56.92				
SPD win new seat	Majority	243	1.00				

== See also ==
- Politics of Brandenburg
- Landtag of Brandenburg
