= Bieten =

Card game popular in the Austrian Tyrol and Bavarian Prealps

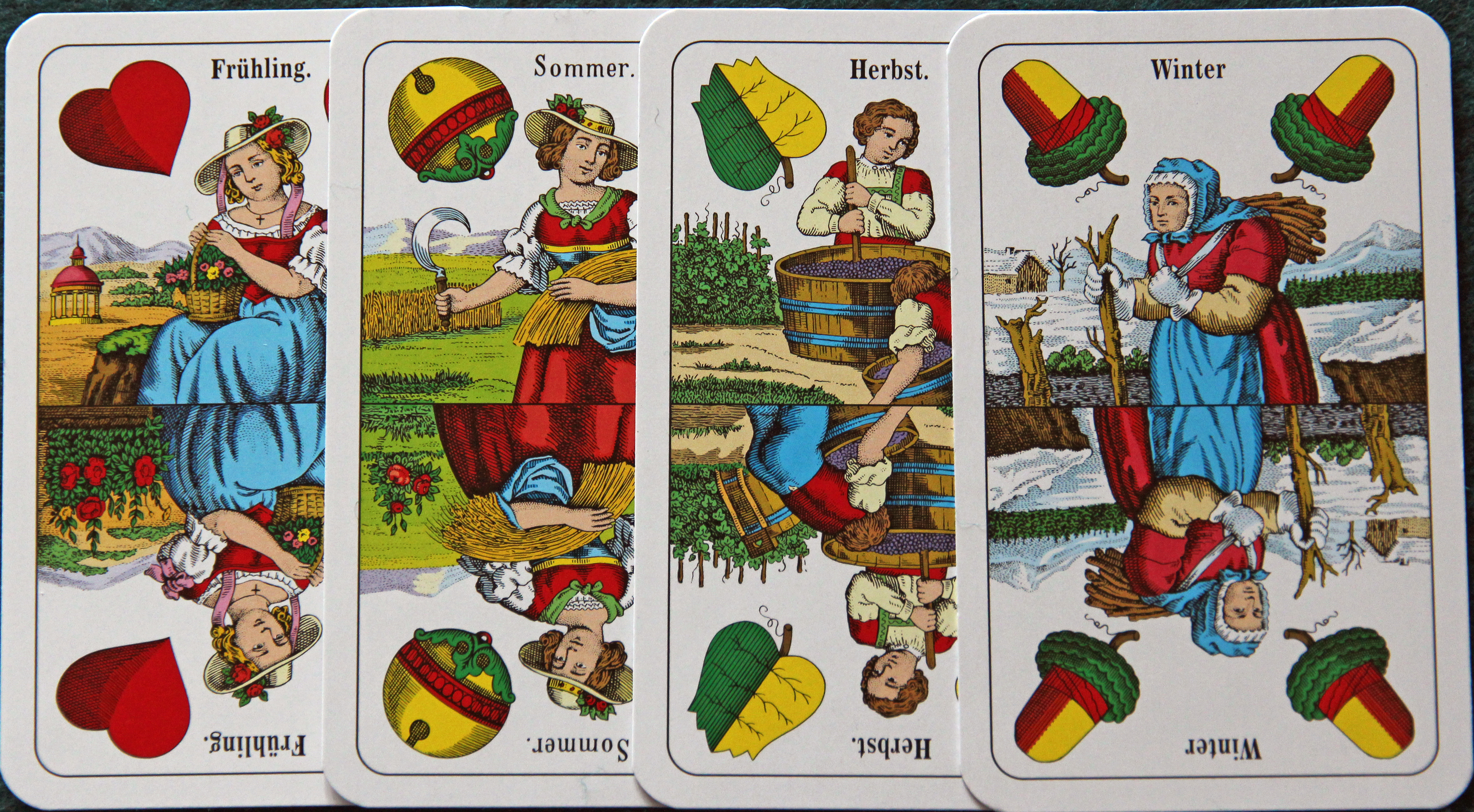
- The highest Gleich, four Deuces
- Origin: Austria, Bavaria
- Type: Trick-taking
- Players: 2-5
- Cards: 33
- Deck: German
- Rank (high→low): A K O U 10 9 8 7 6
- Play: Clockwise
- Playing time: 4 min/hand, 20 min/game

Related games
- Gilten • Perlaggen • Watten

Bieten, Laubbieten, Lab bietn or Labbieten (in South Tyrol) or Bavarian Poker (German: Bayrischer Pocker) is a card game that is popular in the Tyrolean region and the Bavarian Prealps. It used to be a game frequently played by timber rafters and muleteers. It can be seen as a precursor to the traditional Tyrolean game of Perlaggen. The unusual feature of Bieten is the nature of the competition. The players have the option, even if they have a poor hand, of persuading their opponent(s) to cave in through skilful bidding (Bieten) and bluffing.

== Aim ==
The aim of each hand is to score points by winning certain 'figures'.

== Cards ==
German playing cards are used for Bieten. It is usually played by 2 or more players, without partnerships, but 3 or 4 players works best. Of the standard deck of 36 cards, the 6 of Acorns, Leaves and Hearts are removed, leaving only the 6 of Bells, the Weli, in play. The card ranking is as for Watten, i.e. Sow ("A") - King - Ober - Unter - 10 - 9 - 8 - 7 - Weli.

In Austrian Tyrol, William Tell pattern cards (also called "double German cards" or doppeldeutsche Karten) are usually used for Bieten, while in South Tyrol the Salzburg pattern is more common.

== Rules ==
The dealer shuffles the cards and gives the player to the right, the opportunity to cut, before dealing clockwise to each player - depending on the game variant - three or four cards (in two packets). Forehand begins by playing a card, the other players follow in clockwise order. Players must follow suit, but do not have to take the trick. There are no trumps.

The winner of the trick is the player who played the highest card of the led suit. The winner leads to the next trick and so on until all the cards have been played. The cards remain face up on the table in front of each player.

== Figures ==
During the hands, players have the right, during their turn (whether on lead or not), to bid a 'figure' (Figur) before or after playing the card to the trick. A precondition is that the figure in question must be held (exception "Spiel" – see below) and that the figure has not yet been bid for in this hand. The following 5 figures may be bid for:

- Red – won by the player with the highest Hearts card
- Green – won by the player with the highest Leaves card
- Gleich – won by the player with the highest ranking set of at least 2 cards. The highest ranking triple wins or, if no-one has a triple, the highest ranking pair
- Hanger or Hengst - won by the player with the highest run of 2 or more cards of the same suit e.g. Sow-King or Unter-10-9. The highest ranking 3-card run wins or, if no-one has a 3-card run, the highest ranking 2-card sequence.
- Spiel – winning the last trick of the hand

Bidding is initiated e.g. with the words, "I bid my Hearts" ("I biet mein Herz") or "My Greens" ("meine Grünen"). The remaining players must respond in clockwise order and have the following options:

Option (English)	Option (German)	Effect
"Good" or "That's good"	"Guad", "Is guad", "Das Laub ist gut", "ist mir gut", "ich habe kein Laub"	Means "I'll fold." Said if player doesn't hold figure or thinks figure is too low to win. Concedes point(s) to bidder.
"Hold", "I'll hold", "I'll see you", "I'll see your Hearts"	"Schaugn", "Ang'schaut", "I schau Dein Herz", "ich halte", "ich schaue Sie an", "ich gehe nicht."	Means "I'll see you" or "I'll call". Said if they think their figure is higher and they want to match the bid. Confirms the raised bid.
"Three", "Three on that", "Three on your Hearts"	"Drei!", "Drei drauf" or "3 auf Dei Herz"	Equivalent to "I'll raise to three". Said if player thinks their figure is higher, or to bluff, whereupon the other players must reply "good" or "hold"

Spiel is a slightly different figure. Each player may, at any time, bid on a Spiel, because no-one knows at the start who will win the last trick. However, once the first card of the last trick is played, players may only bid if they have the same suit.

== Scoring ==
The aim of Laubbieten is to achieve a pre-agreed total number of game points, typically 11, and not to exceed it. At the end of each hand, players count their own points in accordance with the following rules:

- If a bid is declared "good" by all other players, the bidder gets 1 point, regardless of who has the highest figure
- If a bid is held (seen or called) by any player, the player with the highest figure gets 2 points
- If "three" is bid and declared "good" by all other players, the bidder gets 2 points, regardless of who has the highest figure
- If "three" is bid and held by any player, the player with the highest figure gets 3 points
- If a figure is not bid during a hand, the player with the highest figure automatically gets 1 point
- The player who has the Weli gets 1 point (except in Bavaria)

If two equally ranked figures occur (e. g. twice 2x10s as a Gleich), and the figure was held, then Leaves rank higher than Hearts and Hearts rank higher than the other suits. Another variant is that no player gets a point.

The winner is the player who, after several rounds, is the first to reach the agreed points target, say 11 points, and a small cross is marked in that player's column on the score sheet. The player with the lowest score is the loser and gets a black spot called a Noggele or Bummerl (●). A player who gets close to the target, may only bid enough so as not to exceed it (i.e. may not overbid). In the Bavarian Inn Valley, for example, if 11 points is the target, at 10 points one is gespannt ("constrained") and may no longer bid, albeit may respond to other players' bids with "good" or "hold". The penalty for breaching this is a 2 point deduction or the award of 0 points.

To work out the result of the game, the figures in the last deal are counted in a set order. First, figures that have been bid are scored in the order in which they were first bid; second, the remaining figures are scored in the order: Red, Green, Gleich, Hanger, Spiel.

The usual penalty for breaches of the rules is a 2-point fine.

The rules - especially concerning the Weli - vary from place to place and pub to pub.

== Own language ==
Just as the game of Schafkopf has its own language, so Bieten has its own language which is not always fully intelligible to outsiders.

Call	Meaning
"Di Grian"	"I'll bid on Leaves/Green" (Laub/Grün)
"Di roatn"	"I'll bid on Red/Hearts" (Rot/Herz)
"schaugn"	"I'll hold", "I'll see you"
"guad"	"good" ("I'll fold")
"Drei drauf"	"Three"

== Variants ==
=== Welibieten ===
Welibieten is an old variant which may be seen as a simple stepping stone to the more complex game of Perlaggen. Here, the Weli does not score a point for the player holding it, but may instead be used as a wild card at the point when it is played. It may be used as any other card of the player's choice, but ranks immediately below the natural card it represents.

=== Spitzbieten ===
Another traditional variant was Spitzbieten which took Welibieten one stage further and was actually a simple version of Perlaggen with only three cards. In addition to the Weli, the Seven of Bells and Seven of Acorns were also used as wild cards, called Spitzen. They ranked in the order: 6 Weli, 7, 7. Although simpler than Perlaggen, it is described as a complete and entertaining game for 2 or more players.

== Literature ==
- Auer, Hubert (2015). Watten, Bieten und Perlaggen. Perlen-Reihe, Vol. 659. Perlen-Reihe, Vienna. ISBN 3852234336
- Förderkreis Perlaggen Südtirol (2014). Perlåggen in Südtirol: mit Watten & Bieten. Raetia, Bozen. ISBN 978-88-7283-523-4
- Kastner, Hugo and Gerald Kador Folkvord (2005). Die große Humboldtenzyklopädie der Kartenspiele. Humboldt, Baden-Baden. ISBN 3-89994-058-X
- Sirch, Walter (2008). Vom Alten zum Zwanzger - Bayerische Kartenspiele für Kinder und Erwachsene - neu entdeckt. Bayerischer Trachtenverband.
