= Gilten =

Gilten may refer to the following places:

- Gilten, Germany, a municipality in the district of Heidekreis, in the state of Lower Saxony, Germany
- Gilten (lake), a lake in the municipality of Steinkjer in Trøndelag county, Norway
- Gilten (card game), traditional Austrian card game still played today in the Tyrol
