= Eichel =

Eichel is a German word which means "acorn". It may refer to:

- Hans Eichel (born 1941), German politician
- Jack Eichel, American ice hockey player
- Steve Eichel, American psychologist
- Eichel (card suit), one of the four suits in German pattern playing cards
- Eichel (river), a tributary of the Saar in northeastern France
