= Hubert Auer (card game historian) =

Austrian historian

Hubert Auer (born c. 1950) is an Austrian schoolmaster and card game researcher who is particularly noted for his research into the historic Tyrolean game of Perlaggen which resulted in it being awarded the status of an item of immaterial cultural heritage by the Austrian UNESCO Commission, the first card game in the world to be so honoured. Auer is also the author of two books on the subject. He lives in Telfs.

== Life ==
Auer was born in Imst, Austria.

Auer has been instrumental in reviving traditional Tyrolean card games; in particular Perlaggen, Bieten, Gilten and Watten. A Perlaggen Circle (Förderkreis Perlaggen) had already been formed in South Tyrol in 2004 which holds an annual championship or Meisterschaft in Perlaggen. In 2015, the 6th All-Tyrol Perlaggen Championship (Gesamt-Tiroler Meisterschaft in Perlaggen), in which North Tyrolese Perlaggen players took part.

In June 2016, Auer succeeded in having this traditional Tyrolean card game was declared by the Austrian UNESCO Commission to be an item of immaterial cultural heritage, the first card game to receive such a status. At the same time, in the Tyrolean Folk Art Museum in Innsbruck, a display cabinet was set up which is devoted to Perlaggen.

Auer lives in Telfs and is the headmaster of a high school. He also heads a project into the game of Watten, is the co-founder of the "Telfer Schützenschwegler", the former chairman of the museum association, "Heimatbund Hörtenberg", and active in the "Technical Committee for Traditional Alpine Card Games".

== Works (selection) ==
- Watten, Bieten und Perlaggen (1999), Deuticke.
- Watten, Bieten und Perlaggen, 1st completely revised edition. (2015).

== Literature ==
- Auer, Hubert (2015). Watten, Bieten und Perlaggen (in German) (1st completely revised ed.). Vienna: Perlen-Reihe. ISBN 9783990060476.
