= Set (cards) =

In card games, a combination of three or more cards of the same rank

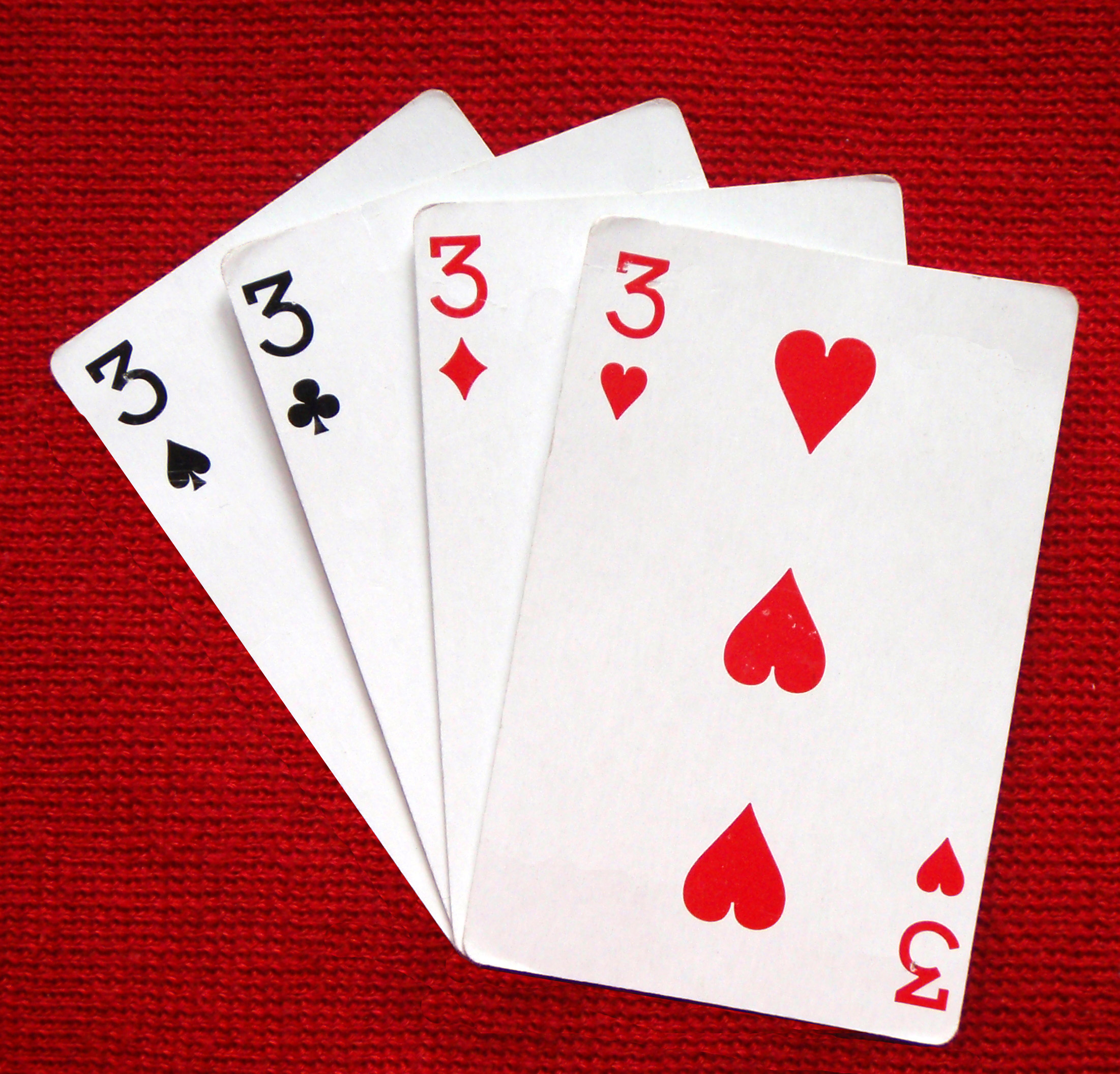
A set of threes

In card games, a set or group is a scoring combination consisting of multiple playing cards, usually of the same rank. Depending on the game, a set may consist of two cards of equal rank (a "pair") as in Bieten, three of a kind as in poker, or more.

== Description ==
Sets are one of the two types of meld that may be used in games where melding is part of the play; the other being a run or sequence. A set or group comprises 3 or 4 cards of the same rank and, usually, different suits. A prial, pair royal, gleek or triplet is a set of 3 cards of equal rank and a quartet or, in some older games, a mournival, is one of four cards of the same rank.

Usually a pair (2 cards of the same rank but different suits) is not counted as a "set"; but some games, such as Bieten or Perlaggen do include pairs as sets. A wild set is one containing wild cards – that is, those cards designated in the rules as being wild, for example, the jokers in Rommé. On the other hand, a natural set is one consisting entirely of 'natural cards'.

In Texas Holdem poker, a set refers to a three of a kind where the player has a pocket pair. This is contrasted with trips which is when a player only has one hole card that matches with two board cards.

== Examples ==
=== French suited cards ===
Pair (may not count as a set)	9 of clubs 9 of spades
Prial or triplet	King of clubs King of hearts King of diamonds
Wild triplet	King of hearts Black Joker King of diamonds
Quartet	Ace of clubs Ace of spades Ace of hearts Ace of diamonds

=== German suited cards ===
Pair (may not count as a set)
Prial or triplet
Quartet

== See also ==
- Run or sequence
- Straight (poker)

== Bibliography ==
- Parlett, David. The Penguin Book of Card Games. London: Penguin (2008). ISBN 978-0-141-03787-5.
