= Perlaggen =

Card game

- Tyrol's national card game
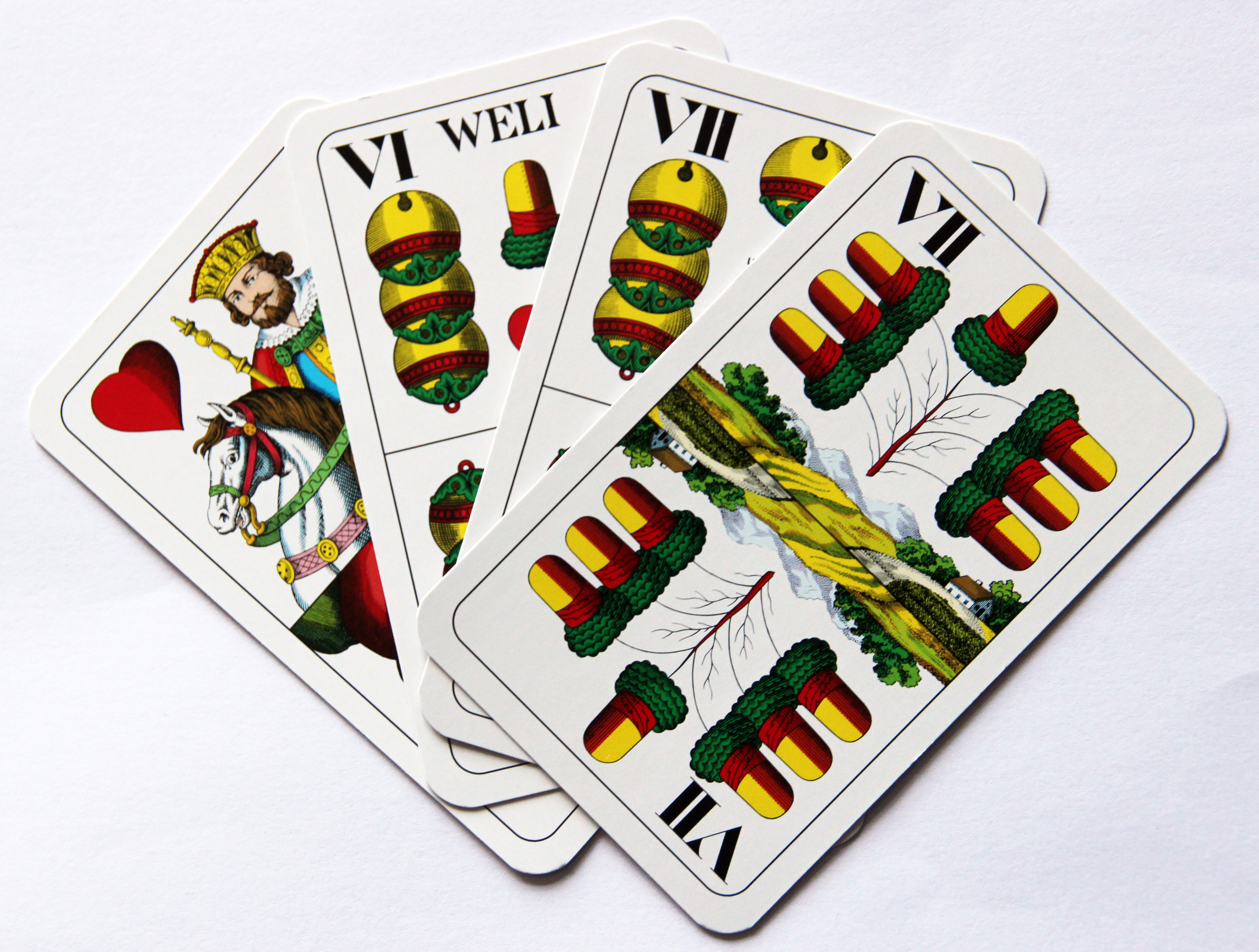
- The permanent trumps or Perlåggen
- Origin: Austria, South Tyrol
- Type: Plain-trick
- Players: 2, 4, 6
- Cards: 33
- Deck: German
- Play: Clockwise

Related games
- Bieten, Watten

Perlaggen (regionally also Perlåggen), formerly Perlagg-Spiel ("game of Perlagg"), is a traditional card game which is mainly played in the regions of South Tyrol in Italy, the Tyrolean Oberland and the Innsbruck areas of Austria. It is the only card game to have been recognised by UNESCO as an item of Intangible Cultural Heritage.

== Origin ==
Perlaggen originated in the South Tyrolean valleys of the Etschtal and Eisacktal when South Tyrol was part of Austria. Its beginnings go back to the 19th century. The oldest known record of the game of Perlaggen comes from an 1853 booklet, Das Tiroler National- oder Perlagg-Spiel, which describes the origins of the game in Giltspiel as well as its rules. At the first Perlaggen Congress, which took place on 19 April 1890 in Innsbruck, the game's inventors, its place and year of origin were confirmed. Its inventors were chancery clerks, Alois von Perkhammer and Josef Pfonzelter, and forestry officials, Ferdinand Gile and Johann Sarer. They created the game at the inn of Zum Pfau in Bozen (now Bolzano), South Tyrol, in the year 1833. Also confirmed at this congress were the rules of the game, albeit they were not always strictly observed; in fact in most places the rules were modified.

In 1858, the Lemberger allgemeiner Anzeiger records that

– The Tyrolese have a strange farmer’s game that doesn't occur anywhere else; it is played by four people with German-suited cards and is called Perlagg. It requires so much intellect, calculation and tricks that one often marvels how a seemingly simple person can develop so much talent to overcome his opponent. Various cards count as the highest trumps or can be turned into any card in the game and are called Perlaggs; they are always called and shouted out very loudly. Of these, the foremost is the Seven of Bells [Schellen-Sieben], usually called Schellbell. In the winter of 1848/49 you could hear everyone yelling "Radetzky" while playing Perlagg. When people inquired about it, they were told that the Perlagg players had christened their top card, Schellbell, "Radetzky" because the old military commander had won everything out of the blue, even better than the Schellbell. The renaming of the mighty Schellbell gradually spread everywhere. As inconspicuous as this local custom is, it is proof of how much the name Radezky has passed into flesh and blood in the land of Tyrol.

=== Name ===
Originally the game had no name. It was only several years later that the term Perlagg emerged in the region around Salurn, where the devil was referred to as the Berlicche. Like the devil, the Perlagg can appear in any possible, suitable form of cards. In the game, the name Perlagg (plural: Perlaggen in German, Perlaggs in English) is applied to a card of a high rank. Auer, the Austrian card expert, uses "Perlaggen" for the game and "Perlåggen" for the special trump cards to distinguish them, although he says the pronunciation is the same – the "å" sounding halfway between a German "a" and German "o".

== Playing ==
=== Cards ===
Acorns (Eichel)	Leaves (Laub)	Hearts (Herz)	Bells (Schellen)
rahmenlos	rahmenlos	rahmenlos	rahmenlos

The game is played with the well known German deck and with 33 cards, i.e. it includes the wild card known as the Weli. In South Tyrol the single-headed Salzburger pattern cards are used; in Austrian Tyrol they generally use the double-headed William Tell pattern.

The game has four suits: Acorns (Eichel), Leaves (Laub), Hearts (Herz) and Bells (Schellen) – see right.

The ranking of the suits is the same. Each suit consists of eight cards in the usual order: Ace/Deuce/Sow (Ass/Daus/Sau), King (König), Ober, Unter, Ten, Nine, Eight, Seven; plus the Weli, a 6 of Bells.

=== Players ===
The game may be played between 2, 4 or 6 players, but it is usually played in fours, two against two. The players sit in a 'cross' with partners facing each other across the table. Each player is dealt five cards. There is also a variation for two players in which they receive seven cards each.

=== Dealing ===
At the start of the game, the player who cuts the highest card deals. Before dealing, the dealer invites the player to the right (from the other team) to cut. If the cutter cuts to one of the Perlagg cards, it may be kept. If there is another one under the first Perlagg, this also belongs to the cutter, as does a third or fourth. It is therefore possible for the cutter to capture all four permanent Perlaggs. The cutter is obliged to show all players the drawn Perlagg(s). Once this obligation is fulfilled, the cutter no longer has to inform anyone during the game what was drawn. After cutting, the cards are dealt to the left. Each player is dealt five cards, two in the first packet and three in the second. The dealer must check if and how many Perlaggs the cutter has captured; if one, the cutter gets only one card the first time; if two, none at all; if three, the cutter gets none the first time and two the second time; if all four Perlaggs are taken, the cutter is dealt no cards in the first packet and one in the second.

If the dealer makes a mistake and, for example, deals two cards in the first packet to the cutter, even though the latter has taken a Perlagg, the opponents may demand that the hand be reshuffled and redealt. In this case, the person on the right of the dealer has the advantage of being allowed to cut a second time. The cutter may keep any Perlaggs found the second time as well.

=== Trump suit ===
If the dealer has dealt the cards correctly so that each of the four players has five cards in hand, the next card, the twenty-first is turned as a trump, i.e. its suit becomes the trump suit and beats the cards of the other three suits. So there are 21 cards in play and twelve remain hidden on the table. The dealer is obliged to show all other players the top and bottom (Luck und Boden) cards once. After that, no-one may look at these cards. Three cards of the trump suit, the 7, the Unter and the Ober, now have the rank of a Perlagg and are therefore called Trump Perlaggs. These three Trump Perlaggs have the same attributes as the four permanent Perlaggs, except that they are lower in rank than the permanent ones. The ranking among them is 7, Unter, Ober.

=== Perlaggs ===
==== Permanent Perlaggs ====
Among the 33 cards which may be 'perlagged', there are four so-called permanent Perlaggs. These four cards are superior to all the others in that, firstly, they beat all other cards in a trick and, secondly, that they may be turned into one of four other cards, a move known as christening (taufen). Naturally, these christened cards may only be used once. These cards are therefore:

- K - Maxl, the King of Hearts, is the highest card, called Maxl after King Maximilian I of Bavaria.
- 6 - Weli, the 6 of Bells, is the second highest. It is also called the geschriebene Weli ("written Weli")
- 7 - Bell Spitz (Schellspitz), the 7 of Bells, is the third highest card, also called Little Weli
- 7 - Acorn Spitz (Eichelspitz), the 7 of Acorns, is the fourth-highest card

If the dealer has a 7, Unter or Ober trump and another trump card in hand, it confers the right to exchange a trump Perlagg which has been turned over for a trump card in hand. If one of the four permanent Perlaggs is turned up, its suit becomes the trump suit, i.e. if the King of Hearts is turned up, Hearts becomes the trump suit, etc., and it can also be replaced with a card of the same suit. The Weli is considered to be a Bell. If the dealer has no trump card, and therefore cannot exchange, the right to exchange passes to the dealer's partner. If the partner has no trump either, the Perlagg remains in place. Under no circumstances may the other team exchange it. Once the first card has been played and the first card has been accepted or beaten, the team entitled to exchange has lost that right. The other team may therefore not anticipate the exchange by throwing the card out. If the team entitled to exchange forgets or overlooks the exchange, that is their own fault; they have only penalised themselves. It is very important for the other team to remember who has exchanged and what kind of Perlagg has been exchanged. Once the game is underway, players are under no obligation to say what has been swapped and who has swapped. Once the dealing and exchanging is over, the game can begin.

==== Perlaggs in play ====
During play, a Perlagg may be christened as any card even if that card has already been played as natural card or as another Perlagg. If two Perlaggs are christened as the same card, they rank in the order: K 6 7 7 T7 TU TO. If they are not christened, they count as their natural card. If a Perlagg is led, players must follow suit according to the suit the Perlagg was christened as.

=== Deuten ===
An important feature of Perlaggen, allowed under the rules, is deuten, whereby partners may communicate the cards they hold to one another by means of signals, gestures and words. They may indicate the number and rank of their Perlaggs and trumps, but also ask openly. As a rule, players signal. Showing one's cards is not allowed. Playing partners may develop their own signals, but in order to help those who have not played together before, there are 'standard' signals which were described by Schwaighofer as early as 1926. These are:

- Martl held: rolling the eyes (upwards)
- Weli held: forming a kiss, pointing the tip of the tongue
- Bell Spitz held: forming a kiss, pointing the tip of the tongue to the left or right
- Acorn Spitz held: winking the right eye
- Trump Perlagg held: winking the left eye
- Number of trump cards held: tapping the middle finger on the tabletop
- No Perlaggs and no trumps held: shaking the head
- Quartet held: move the hand from the right corner of the mouth to the right ear
- Run of four cards held: move the hand from the middle of the mouth down to the neck

=== Figures ===
There are three so-called 'figures' (Figuren) in Perlaggen: the Gleich, the Hanger and the Spiel. The game turns on these three figures, for which points are scored.

Gleich: A Gleich is two or more cards of the same rank e.g. two 10s, three kings, etc. Two aces are known as the "highest Gleich" (Gleich höchst or höchstes Gleich). Two equally high cards are known as a "pair" or "simple Gleich" (einfaches Gleich), three as a "triplet" (dritziges Gleich), four as a "quartet" (viertiges Gleich) and so on. If these multiple Gleichs consist of aces, they are called "highest triplet" (höchst dritzigen), etc.

Hanger: The Hanger comprises two or more consecutive cards of the same suit e.g. the 10 of Acorns, Unter of Acorns, Ober of Acorns and King of Acorns. The Hanger is called "highest" if it consists of the highest cards - the King and Deuce - of the same suit.

Spiel: Because each player has five cards, one team will take three or more tricks and the other only two or fewer. The team that wins three tricks, has won the Spiel ("game") and earns one or more points (Gutpunkte), according to whether their opponent has left or held the game well. One often leaves the game to the opponent, that is one gifts it, in order not to have to play one's own cards, which could be important when playing the other two figures, the Gleich and the Hanger, and thereby having to reveal one's own cards.

=== Trump suit ===
Trumps beat all other suits. Suit must be followed under all circumstances, even if the led suit has been beaten by an intermediate card with a trump or a Perlagg. All Perlaggs are independent cards and count neither as part of a suit nor a trump card. If a Perlagg is played or put down during the game, it must be christened immediately by its owner, who must indicate which card it is to be considered as. If the Perlagg owner does not name the card, the Perlagg becomes a simple card. Once a Perlagg has been christened, it must not be renamed under any circumstances. With Perlaggs one does not need to declare one's trumps or suit, because in a sense they do not belong to any particular suit.

=== Bidding ===
To bid in Perlaggen players will say something like: "I bid my Gleich!" or "I bid the Spiel!". It is essential that the player bidding actually uses the words "I bid..." or "... bid!" For example, if a player says only "Gleich!" or "Spiel!", this is not a valid bid according to the rules of the game and experienced players may use this rule to catch newcomers out. If a bid has been offered, the other team must reply, for example, with "good!" indicating they don't wish to contest the bid, "hold!" meaning that they accept the bid or "three!" to raise the bid further. Typical bids and responses are as follows:

Option (English)	Option (German)	Effect
"I bid my Gleich!", "I bid the Spiel!", "Gleich bid!"	"Ich biete mein Gleich!", "Ich biete das Spiel!", Gleich geboten!	The bidder wishes to increase the figure value by one point
"The Gleich's good", "Good, the Hanger"	"Gut das Gleich", "Gut der Hanger", "Gut das Spiel"	Means the opponent will fold and concede the point(s). Said if they don't hold the figure or think their figure is too low to win.
"I'll hold the Gleich", "I'll see your Gleich", "I'm not giving up the Gleich"	"Ich halte das Gleich", "Ich schaue das Gleich an", "Ich gehe nicht vom Gleich"	Means the opponent will match the bid and compete for the figure at the higher value. Said if they think their figure is higher.
"Three"	"Drei!"	Equivalent to "I'll raise to three". Said if player thinks their figure is higher, or to bluff, whereupon the other players must reply.
"Good at two", "I'll hold the three", "I'll see your three", "I'm not giving up the three", "Four!"	"Gut das Gleich", "Ich halte die drei", "Ich schaue die drei an", "Ich gehe nicht von den drei" "Vier!"	These responses to a bid of "three" indicate whether the opponent will concede 2 points to the bidder, match the bid or raise it further

Bids may be raised up to a total of 7 points.

The two players who form a team are partners and count as one person to the opposition. One is responsible for the other and both are jointly responsible.

The game is usually played for 18 points. The pair that reach 18 first, win the game.

== Variants ==
=== Two-hand Perlaggen ===
Perlaggen may be played by two people using the same rules as the four-hand game, but without deuten. One author suggests that it is more interesting to deal 7 cards to both players, as packet of 2, packet of 3, then the face-up trump, then another packet of two. Alternatively the dealer may deal 3 each, then the trump, then 4 each. Four tricks are needed to win the Spiel figure.

== Recognition ==
Since 2004 there has been a Perlaggen Circle (Förderkreis Perlaggen) in South Tyrol which holds an annual championship, the Meisterschaft in Perlaggen. 2015 saw the 6th All-Tyrol Perlaggen Championship (Gesamt-Tiroler Meisterschaft in Perlaggen), in which North Tyrolese Perlaggen players took part.

In June 2016, this traditional Tyrolean card game was declared by the Austrian UNESCO Commission to be an item of immaterial cultural heritage. At the same time, in the Tyrolean Folk Art Museum in Innsbruck, a display cabinet was set up which is devoted to Perlaggen.

== Literature ==
- _ (1853). Das Tiroler National- oder Perlagg-Spiel, Wagner, Innsbruck.
- _ (1858). "Vermischtes" in Lemberger allgemeiner Anzeiger, No. 43, ed. by Josef Glöggl. 18 March 1858.
- Auer, Hubert. Watten, Bieten und Perlaggen. Perlen-Reihe, Vol. 659. Vienna: Perlen-Reihe (2015). ISBN 3852234336
- Förderkreis Perlaggen Südtirol. Perlåggen in Südtirol mit Watten & Bieten. Bozen: Raetia (2014). ISBN 978-88-7283-523-4
- Schwaighofer, Hermann. Die Tiroler Kartenspiele Bieten, Watten, Perlaggen. Innsbruck: Wagner (1926), 95 pp.
