= Weli =

Card in Austrian card games

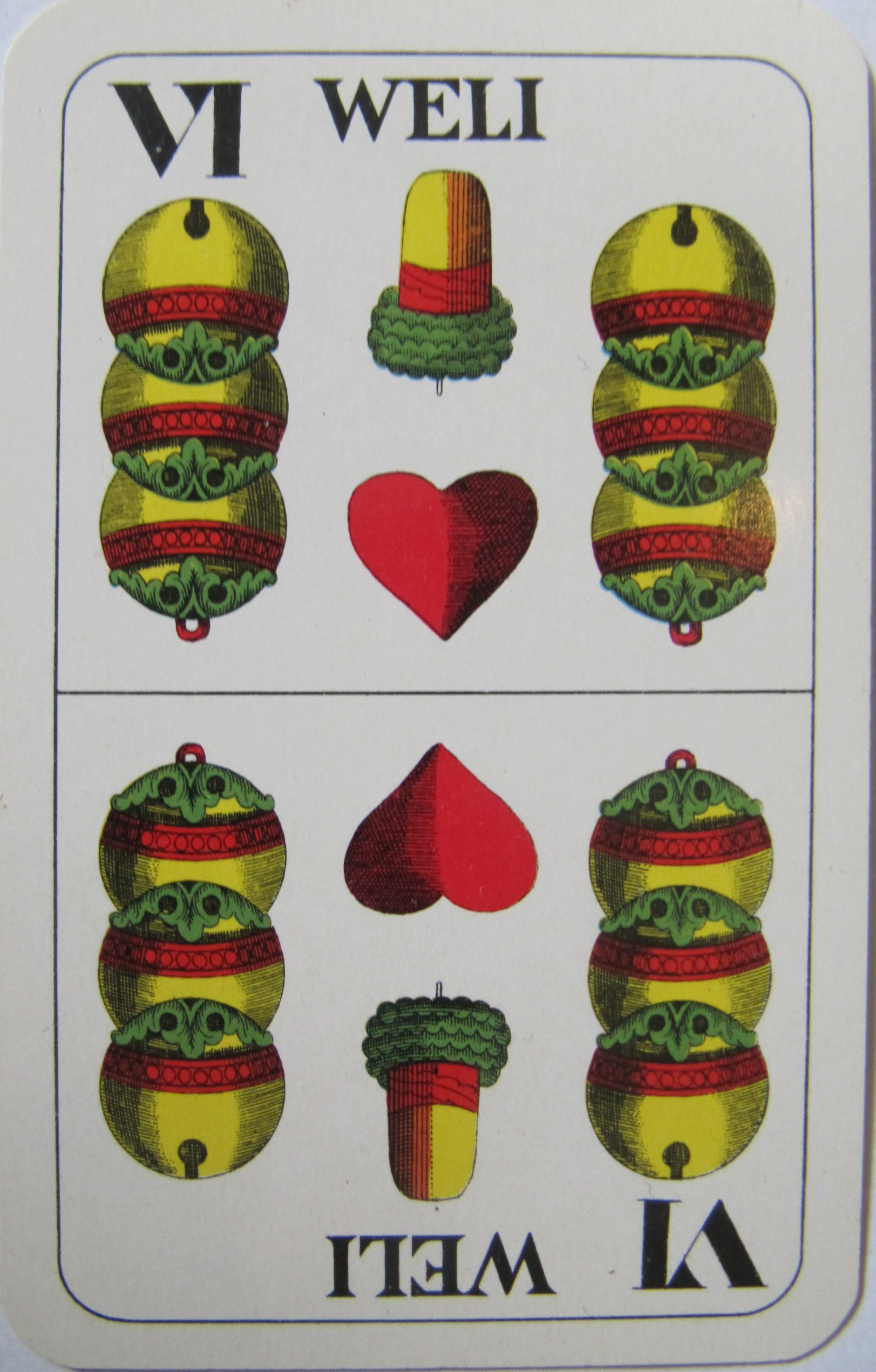
The Weli from a Tell pack

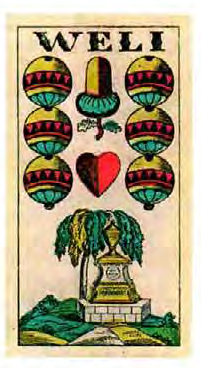
The Weli from a Salzburg pattern pack with a depiction of St. Paul's grave, C.Titze & Schickay, Vienna, 1866.

The Weli, formerly Welli, is a playing card used in the Salzburg and William Tell card decks, which are Austrian regional patterns of the German-suited playing cards. It has the value of 6 of Bells and, in the South Tyrol variant of the card game, Watten, it is the only 6 used and can, in addition to its own suit of Bells, join the trump suits of Acorns, Hearts and Leaves. In all other variants of Watten, the 7 of Bells is the Weli.

== History ==
The Weli is also often called the Welli or Belli and, dialectically, the Wöli, Wöüli, Bölle or Belle. The name Weli probably comes from the Italian word belli, which means "bells".

Historically the Weli is first recorded in the early 1850s, when a Bozen card manufacturer inscribed WELLI onto the six of bells. As early as 1855, the Weli was integrated in the Salzburg pattern as the 6 of Bells. The gravestone appearing in many depictions is probably the grave of the Apostle Paul.

In the game of Jaggln, the Six of Bells is usually called the Buggl (Austrian dialect for Buckel, a hump or rounded object, perhaps referring to the shape of the bells).

== As a high trump ==
Games in which the Weli has the role of a matador i.e. high trump include:

- Préférence – in a variant played in western Austria the Weli is the 2nd highest trump.
- Watten – in the Austrian variant of Critical Watten, the Weli is sometimes the 2nd highest trump.
- Perlaggen – the Weli is the 2nd highest permanent 'Perlagg' which may then be used as a wild card (see below).

== As a wild card ==
In the Austrian games of Bieten, and Perlaggen, the Weli acts as a wild card, something which is illustrated by the depiction of two other suits (Acorns and Hearts) on the card and by its special design (it is the only playing card with a printed name). In other games, it is simply the six of bells.
