= Marcel Penquitt =

German politician (born 1986)

Member of the Landtag of Brandenburg
- Incumbent
- Assumed office 17 October 2024
- Preceded by: Helmut Barthel
- Constituency: Teltow-Fläming I

Personal details
- Born: 1 May 1986 (age 39)
- Party: Social Democratic Party (since 2002)

Marcel Penquitt (born 1 May 1986) is a German politician serving as a member of the Landtag of Brandenburg since 2024. He has served as president of Ludwigsfelder FC since 2016.
