= Danny Eichelbaum =

German politician (born 1973)

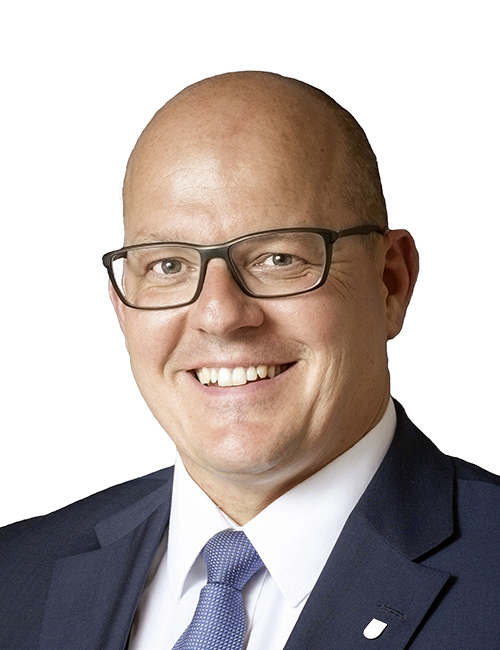
- Eichelbaum in 2019

Member of the Landtag of Brandenburg
- Incumbent
- Assumed office 21 October 2009

Personal details
- Born: 25 December 1973 (age 52) Treuenbrietzen
- Party: Christian Democratic Union (since 1992)

Danny Eichelbaum (born 25 December 1973 in Treuenbrietzen) is a German politician serving as a member of the Landtag of Brandenburg since 2009. He has served as chairman of the district council of Teltow-Fläming since 2019.
