= Wild card (cards) =

Card which may stand in for a card of another value

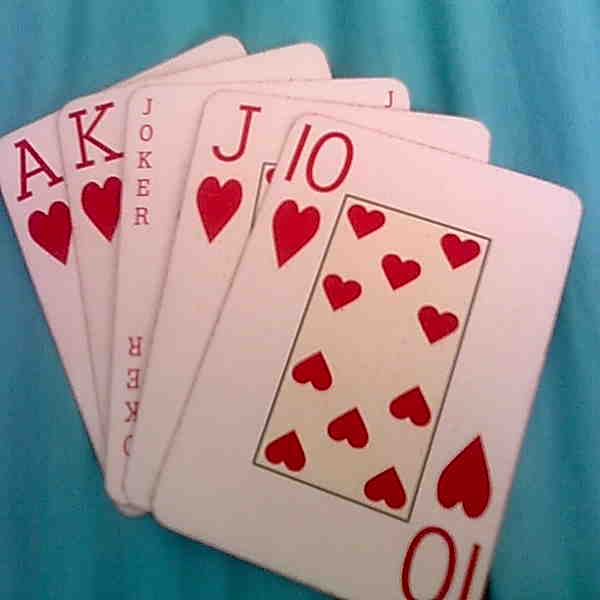
A joker wild card representing the Queen of Hearts

A wild card in card games is one that may be used to represent any other playing card, sometimes with certain restrictions. Jokers are often used as wild cards, but other cards may be designated as wild by the rules or by agreement. In addition to their use in card games played with a standard pack, wild cards may also exist in dedicated deck card games, such as the 'Master' card in Lexicon.

== Use ==
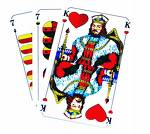
Three of the wild cards in Perlaggen

A wild card is one that may be used to represent any natural card, its holder usually designating its rank and suit. Jokers are frequently used as wild cards, for example in games of the Rummy family. Jokers, however, may also have other uses, such as being a permanent top trump in games like Euchre or 500, the odd one out in Old Maid, or high-value matching cards in Zwicker.

In many games, ordinary cards may be designated as wild, for example, the J♣ and 9♦ in Classic Brag or the "deuces wild" in Poker. A card that is not wild may be referred to as a natural card.

In some cases, the wild card or cards must be agreed upon by players before the cards are dealt and play commences. However, in many games, such as Canasta, Perlaggen or Yellow Dwarf, the wild card or cards are a standard feature of the rules.

In some Austrian and South Tyrolean card games, one or more other cards may be used as wild cards, including the Weli, a special 6 of Bells, the 7 of Bells and 7 of Acorns. In the game of Perlaggen there are six or seven wild cards: four permanent Perlaggs - K or Maxl, 6 or Weli, 7 or Little Weli, the 7 of Bells or Bell-Spitz and 7 or Eichelspitz - as well as 3 "Trump Perlaggs" - the 7, Unter and Ober of Trumps.

== Casino practice ==
Sometimes a distinction is made between being fully or partially wild. A card that is fully wild can be designated by its holder as any card they choose with no restrictions. Under this rule, for example, a hand with any natural pair and a wild card becomes three of a kind.

A 'limited wild' card may be called a 'bug'. The common rule in casinos is that a wild card plays as a bug, which is given the rank of ace unless designating it as a different card would complete a straight, flush, or straight flush. Under this rule, a hand such as K♠ K♥ Jkr 5♣ 2♥ is just a pair of kings (with an ace kicker), but any four same-suit cards with a bug make a flush, and a hand such as 7♥ Jkr 5♣ 4♥ 3♠ makes a straight.

There is also a variation of the "fully wild" rule in which the wild card (in this instance they are usually jokers as there are traditionally only two and there is only one black and one red) can be any card of the suits matching the cards colour or current suit. For example, in a jokers wild game with these rules, the red joker could be used as any card of hearts or diamonds. Inversely, the black joker would be any card of clubs or spades.

Two exceptions to standard poker practice sometimes seen in home games are the double-ace flush rule, and the natural wins rule. The latter rule states that between hands that would otherwise tie, the hand with fewer wild cards wins. This is not common in casinos and should be treated as an exception to standard practice (as is the double-ace flush).

== Examples ==
The following is a selection of cards and the games in which they are wild, based on Parlett:

- J♦ – Boston, Guimbarde and Reversis
- 7♦ – Yellow Dwarf
- 7 – Perlaggen
- 7 – Perlaggen
- K – Perlaggen
- S – Mus
- C – Mus
- Matto – Ottocento
- Bègato – Ottocento
- Deuces – Wild-card Rummy, Push Rummy, Canasta, Brag

== See also ==
- Wildcard character
