= Acorns (suit) =

German playing card suit

- Symbol from Bavarian pattern
- Native name: German: Eichel
- Decks: German-suited playing cards; Swiss-suited playing cards
- Invented: 15th century

Acorns (German: Eichel, or more unusually Hackl or Ecker) is one of the four playing card suits in a deck of German-suited and Swiss-suited playing cards. This suit was invented in 15th-century German-speaking lands and is a survivor from a large pool of experimental suit signs created to replace the Latin suits. Around 1480, French card makers adapted this sign into clubs in a French deck (known as clovers in France).

In English, cards are referred to as in a French deck (e.g. the "10 of Acorns"), but in German as Eichel-Zehn.

Acorns are the highest suit in the games of Skat, Schafkopf and Doppelkopf, but the lowest in Préférence. In Watten, the 7 of Acorns (the Spitz or Soach) is the third highest trump card.

The standard German-suited system of leaves, acorns, hearts, and bells appears in the majority of cards from 1460 onwards. There is no evidence for this system prior to this point.

Acorns appear as one of four suits alongside crowns, bells, and shields in a set of mutilated cards possibly made in Alsace in 1480.

Acorns appear as one of four suits alongside pomegranates (Note: The pomegranates suit appeared earlier in a 1496 modified Spanish-suited pack made by a south German engraver where the pomegranates replaced the coins suit. It possibly alludes to the kingdom of Granada.), leaves, and flowers in a pack of cards (circa 1523) created by Hans Sebald Beham. The ranks go from 2 through 10 with three court cards: King seated on a horse, Ober, and Unter. Roman numerals are indexed at the top of the cards while Arabic numerals are indexed at the bottom. Notably, all the pip cards have a central stem and there is a sow on the three of acorns; which later would migrate to the deuce when the 3-rank was dropped in later packs.

The standard four Swiss-German suits of shields, acorns, hawkbells, and flowers were found in playing cards inside a book cover (circa 1530) made in Basel. These cards feature the distinguishing banner replacing the 10-rank, and have the three court cards: King seated in a throne, Ober, and Unter. This Swiss-German suit system is believed to have developed earlier with the earliest example dated between 1433 and 1451, though only cards from the shields suit survived.

== Gallery ==
=== German pattern ===
The gallery below shows a suit of Acorns from a German-suited deck of 32 cards. The pack is of the Saxonian pattern in which the seeds of the Acorns are red:

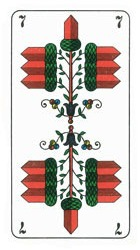
7

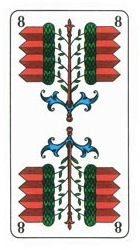
8

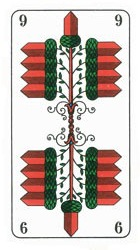
9

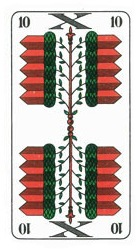
10

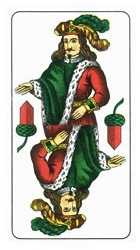
Unter

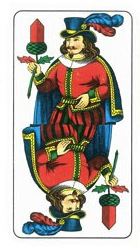
Ober

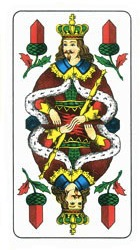
King

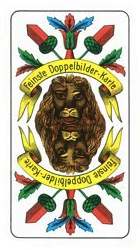
Deuce or Ace

=== Swiss-German pattern ===
The following images depict the suit of Acorns from an 1850 Swiss-suited pack in which the seeds of the Acorns are yellow:

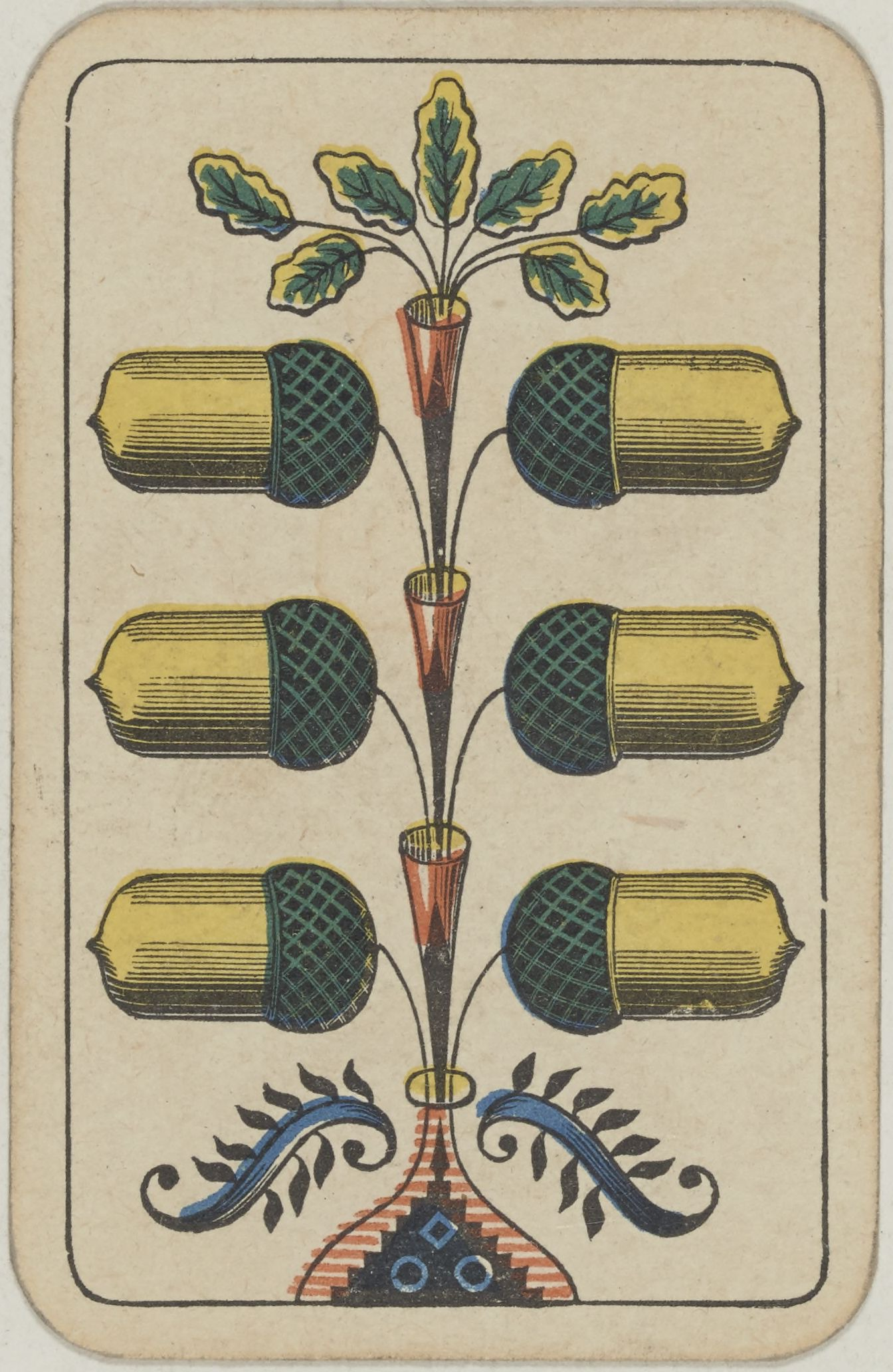
6

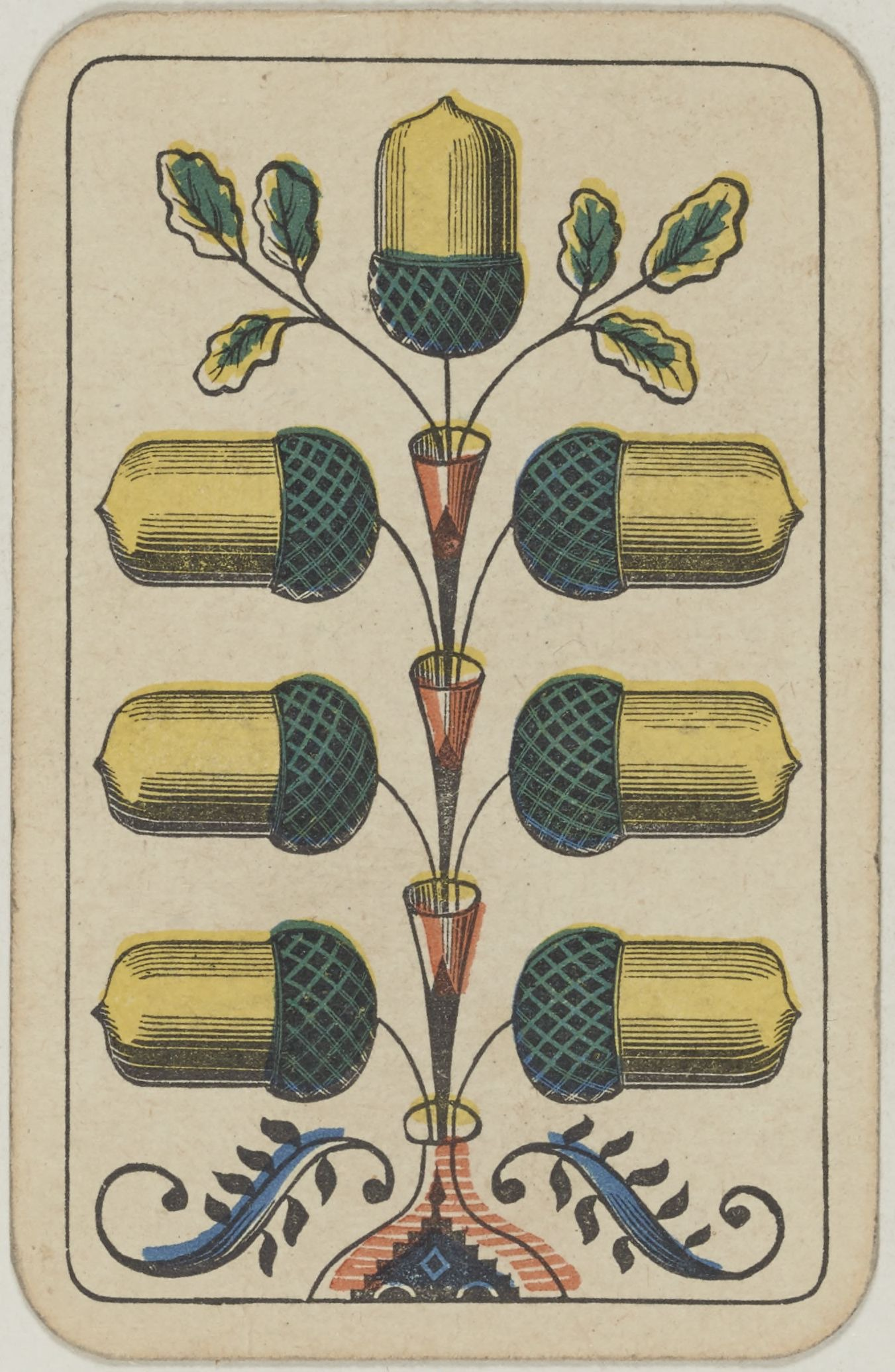
7

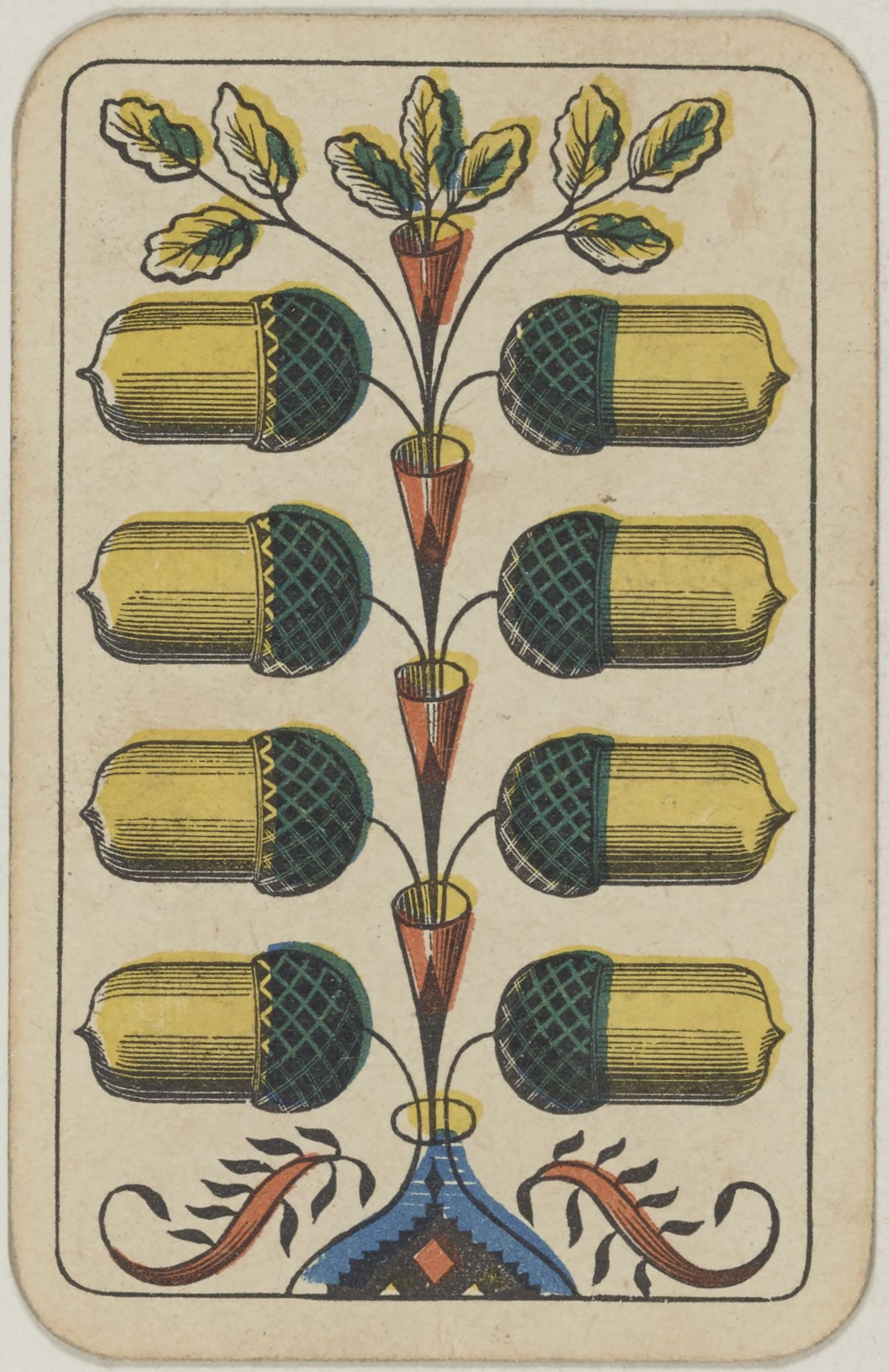
8

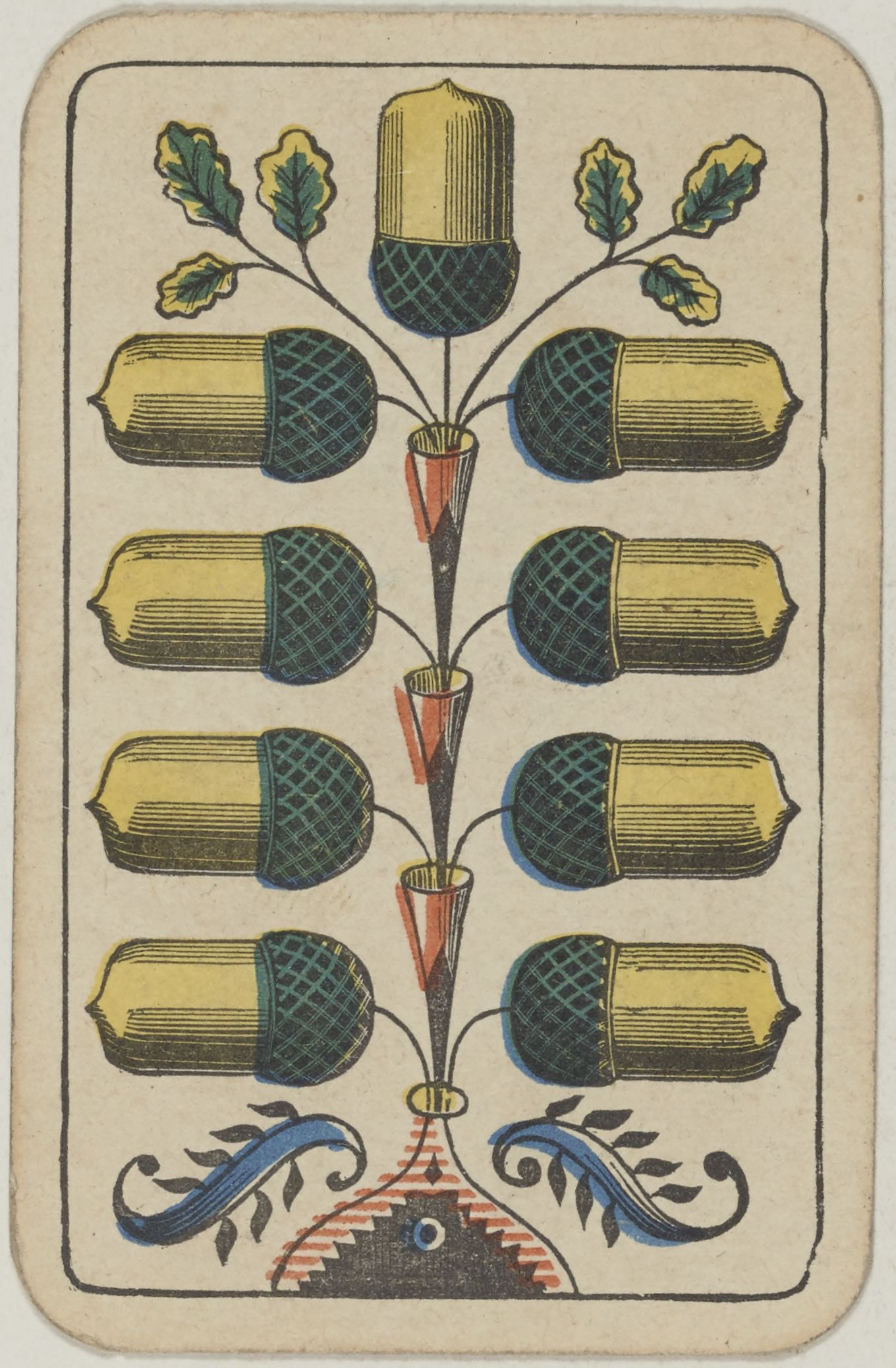
9

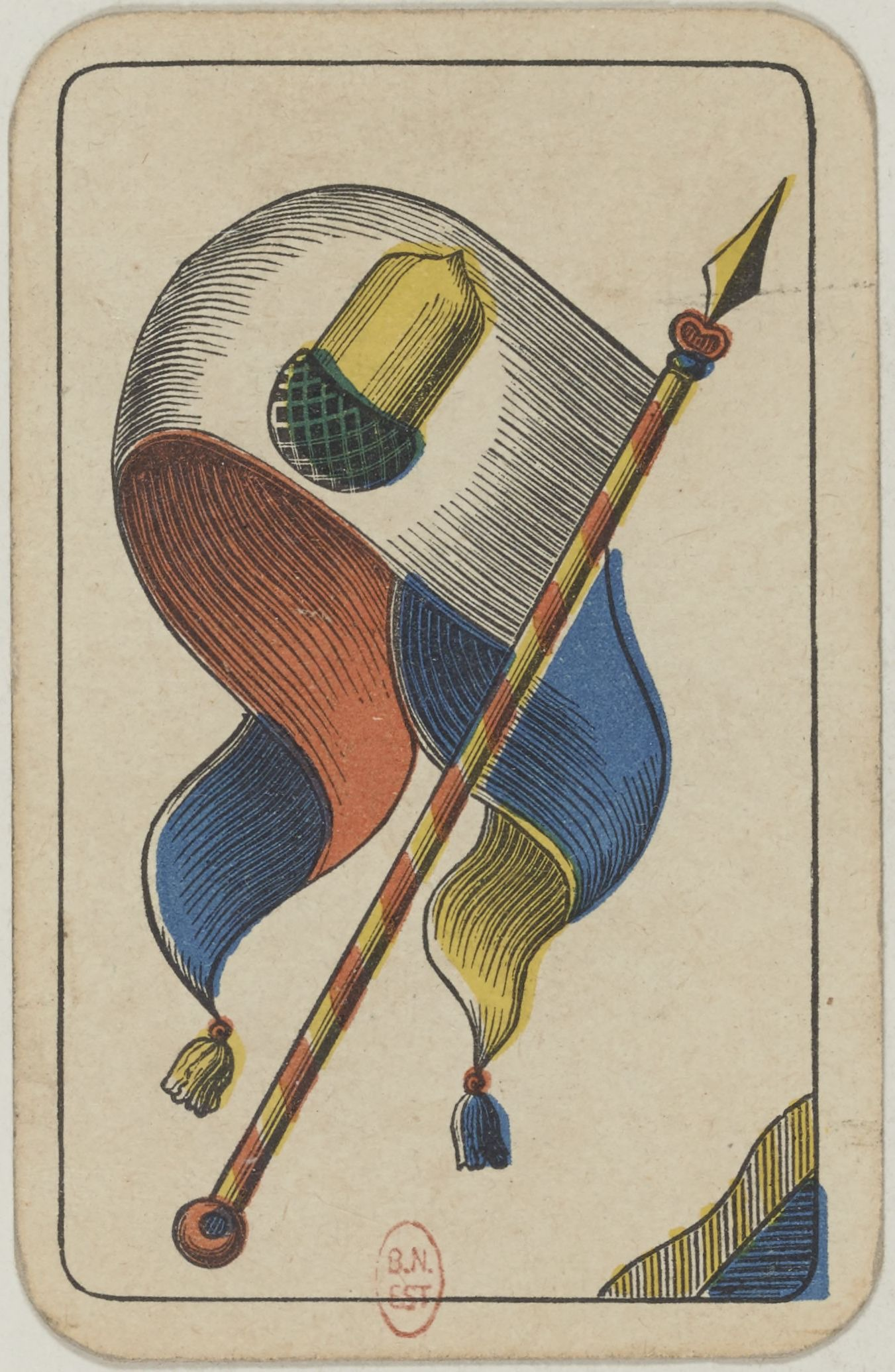
Banner

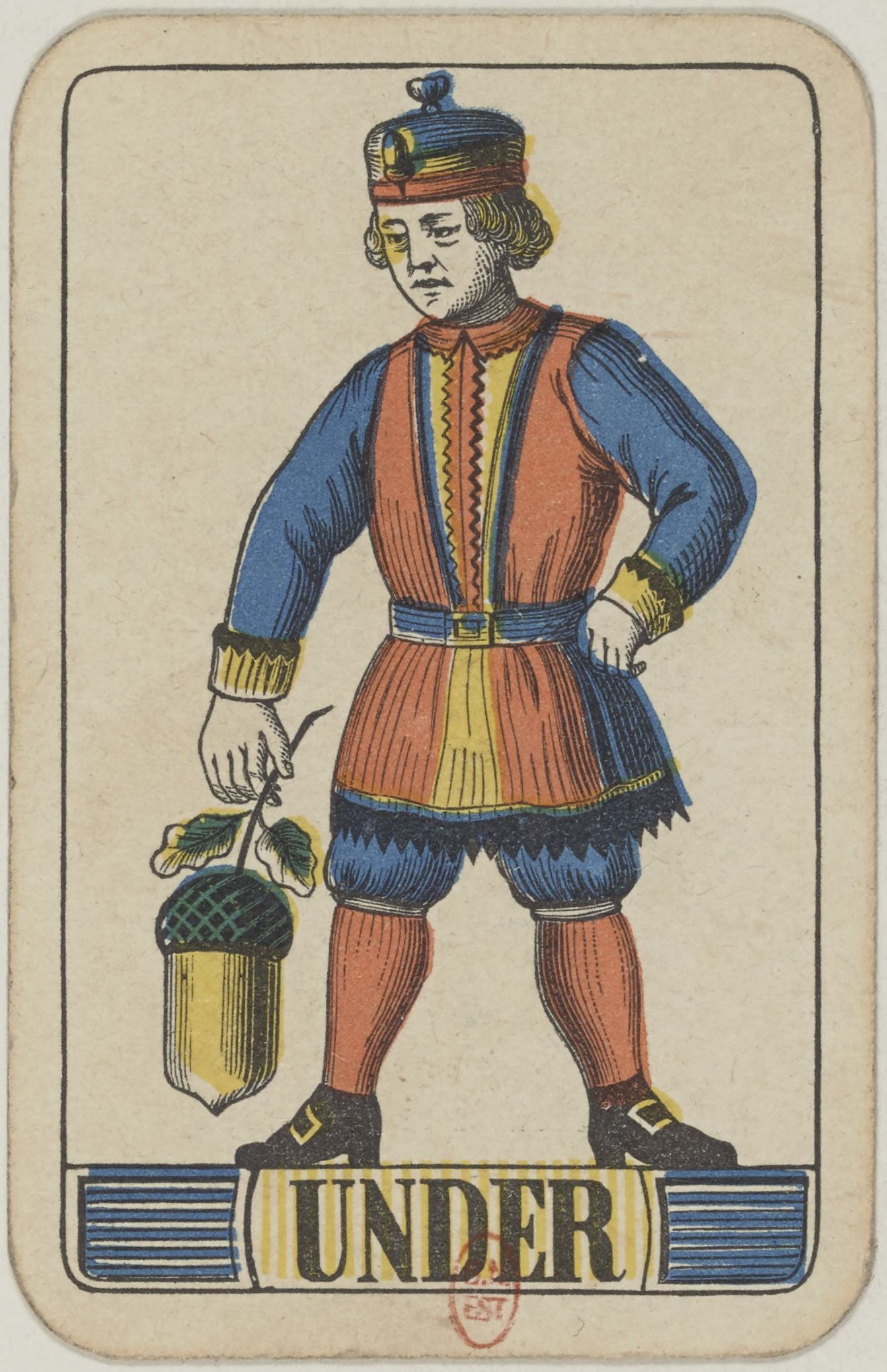
Unter

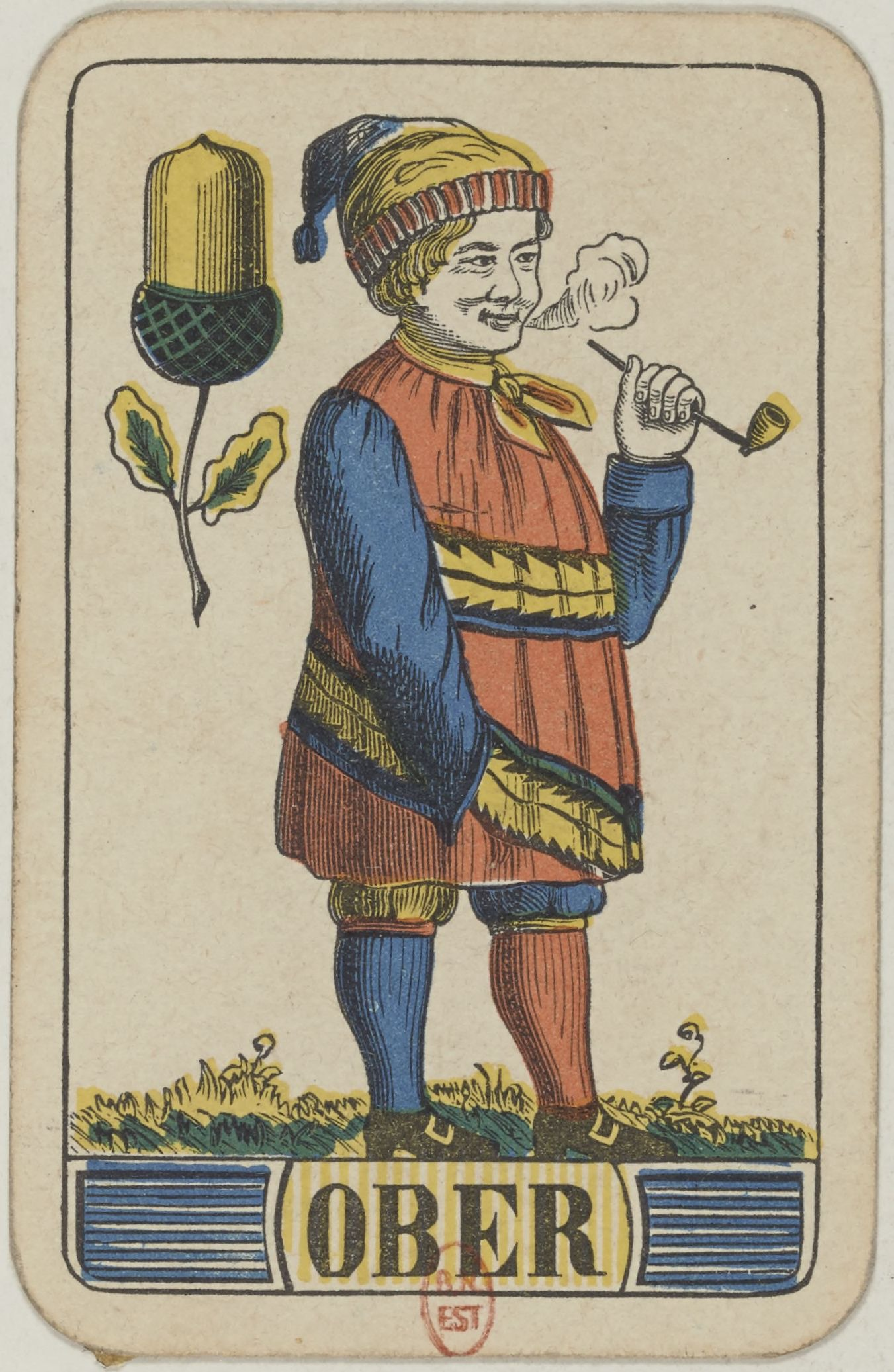
Ober

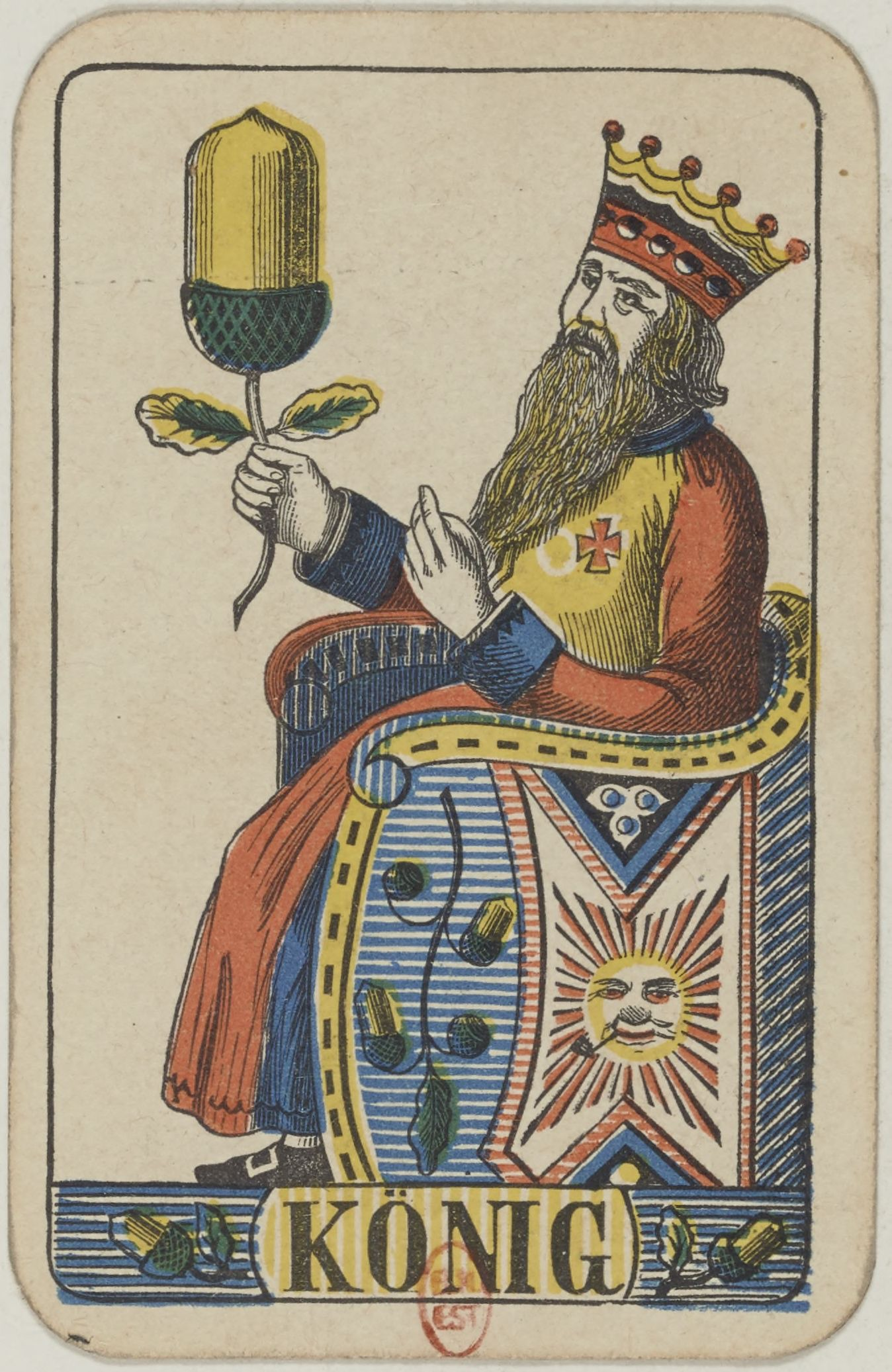
King

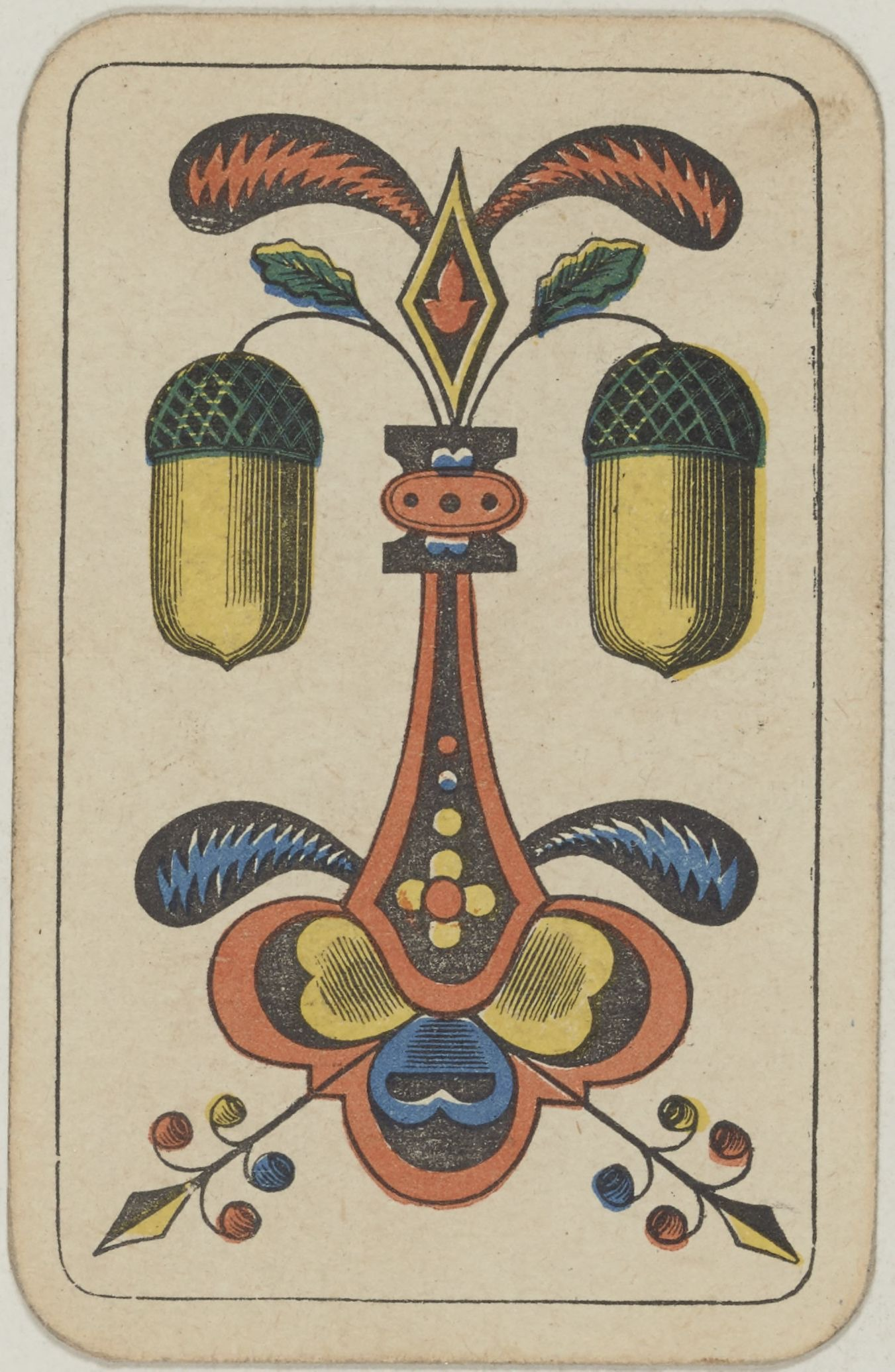
Deuce

== Individual cards ==
The following cards have special powers or names in certain games:

- Ober of Acorns - permanent top trump in Schafkopf, where it is known as the Old Man (der Alte)
- Unter of Acorns - permanent trump in Schafkopf and top trump in Skat.
- Seven of Acorns - one of the top three trumps in games like Watten, where it is called the Spitz ("tip" or "point")
