= Gröben (Ludwigsfelde) =

District of the town of Ludwigsfelde

Gröben has been a district of the town of Ludwigsfelde in the district of Teltow-Fläming in Brandenburg since 31 December 1997. The village, with a population of 349 and an area of 6.91 km² (as of 31 December 2023), is particularly significant for its history, cultural landscape, village church, and the oldest church register in the Mark Brandenburg. The intact cultural landscape of the Nuthe-Nieplitz Nature Park, located just outside Berlin, led to new economic goals after German reunification with the introduction of tourist attractions. The Gröbener Kietz is one of the few remaining original medieval Kietze.

== Geography ==
=== Geographical location ===
Gröben is located approximately six kilometres southwest of Ludwigsfelde in the north of the Nuthe-Nieplitz Nature Park at the confluence of the Nuthe and Nieplitz rivers, each around ten kilometres from the southwestern city limits of Berlin and the Brandenburg state capital Potsdam. Neighbouring villages are Schiaß, Jütchendorf, and Siethen, which also belong to Ludwigsfelde, as well as Fahlhorst and Tremsdorf in the municipality of Nuthetal. The Gröbener See lake lies to the south of the village.

Two historical maps are presented and explained in a separate section. In addition, a current map shows the location of Gröben in the overall Fläming region southwest of Berlin.

=== Natural geographical location ===
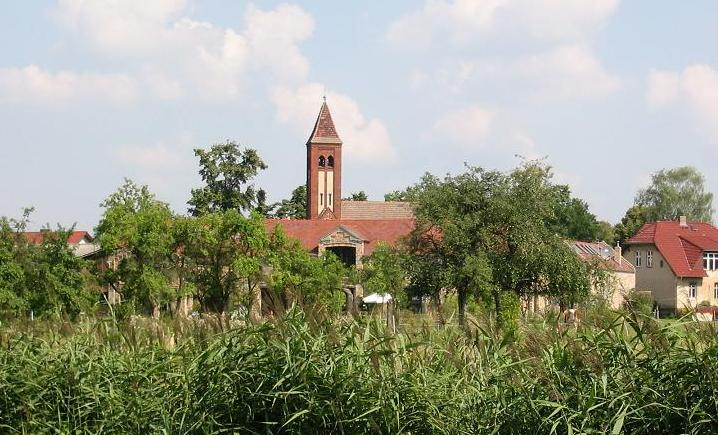
The village of Gröben in Brandenburg

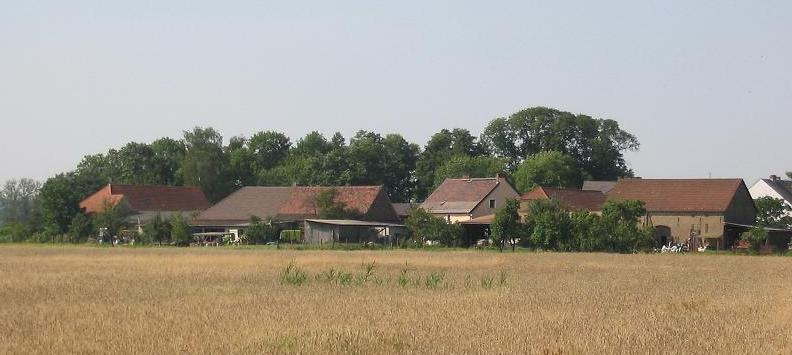
Gröbener neighbourhood

Fields, orchard meadows, wet meadows, small hills, flocks of sheep, water mills, and natural ash tree avenues, together with a small-scale alternation of biotopes in the Nuthe-Nieplitz Nature Park, form a tranquil cultural landscape into which the village of Gröben with its lake fits perfectly. Immediately behind the neighbourhood begins the extensive nature reserve Nuthe-Nieplitz-Niederung, which encompasses the Gröbener See lake. The Flachsee is part of a chain of lakes, with the last link being the Siethener See and, before that, the Grössinsee and Schiaßer See to the east. The lakes lie across the Nuthe lowlands in a former glacial drainage channel and are remnants of former meltwater lakes. The nutrient-rich Gröbener See lake is only around 1.50 m deep and covers an area of approximately 24 hectares. It is surrounded by a largely inaccessible shore zone with a wide reed belt and alder groves, scattered pine forests, and species-rich wet meadows. In spring and autumn, the lake serves as a resting place for Nordic wild geese and cranes. Ospreys have their feeding grounds here, and cormorants, herons, and occasionally sea eagles can be seen in the meadows. Pygmy shrews, tree lizards, penduline tits, and marsh harriers seek shelter in the reeds.

=== Watercourse ===
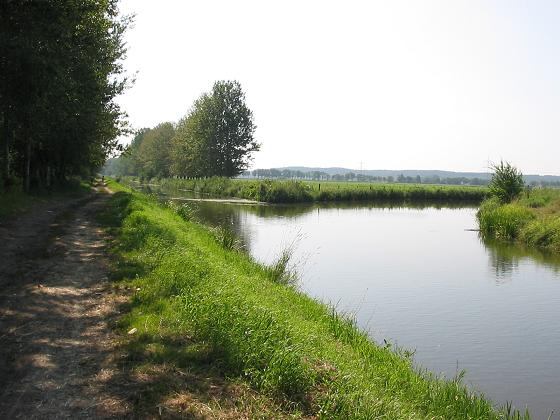
Nieplitz estuary, Glauer Mountains in the background

The two rivers that give the nature park its name converge between Gröbener Kietz and Jütchendorf; here, the Nieplitz flows into the Nuthe, which in turn flows into the Havel in Potsdam. The upper Nuthetal valley was formed in the middle stage of the Weichselian glaciation around 20,000 years ago as an interglacial valley between the Berlin and Baruth glacial valleys. It divides the gently rolling sand plateau of the Zauche from the ground moraine plateau of the Teltow. Both are located upstream of the rivers' source, the Fläming ridge.

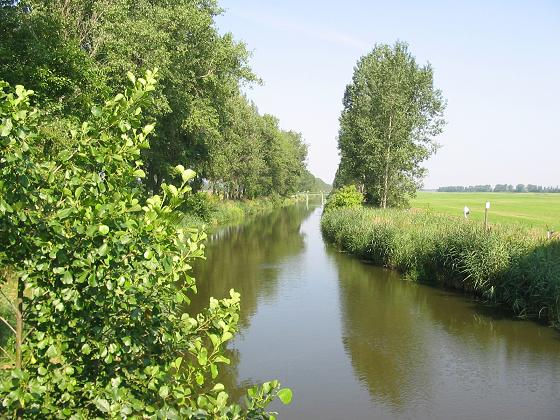
Nuthe at the Kietzer Bridge

Damp hollows, silt, deeply embedded and thawing dead ice from the Ice Age, and the high groundwater level in the lowlands led to the swamping of large areas. The neighbouring villages of Jütchendorf and Schiaß, which were connected by a road, were, for example, separated by the impenetrable "Große Nuthemoor" (Great Nuthe Moor). The regulation of the two rivers played a decisive role in the drainage work that was begun by the first settlers in the 13th century and continued over centuries. Throughout history, the Nuthe and Nieplitz rivers frequently caused major flooding. This "emergency" caused by the river may have given it its name, as "Noth" is derived from the Old German word "Nuth". The name Nieplitz probably comes from Slavic and means something like "the unnavigable" – in contrast to the navigable Nuthe, which was still up to 40 metres wide in 1880.

Until the 19th century, the Nuthe still flowed in the bed of today's Alte Nuthe directly next to the Gröbener Kietz. About 600 metres north of the Kietz, the Alte Nuthe enclosed an island on which, according to old maps such as the one shown here, the medieval Gröbener Burg stood. After rudimentary drainage by the first settlers, mill dams in the Middle Ages led to the re-swamping of large areas. Between 1772 and 1782, on the initiative of Frederick the Great, an extensive system of inner moats such as the Pfeffergraben and Strassgraben was created, which partially converted the floodplains into the "usable state" demanded by Frederick. The Königskanal, named after Frederick, enabled the considerable volumes of water from the Pfefferfließ to be diverted more quickly past the Nieplitz chain of lakes and directly into the Nuthe. The Königskanal, which served as a flood relief channel for the Nieplitz, began shortly after Stangenhagen, before the Blankensee, and only joined the Nuthe north of Gröben, shortly before Saarmund.

In 1713, at the instigation of the Soldier King Frederick William I, beavers were released into the Nuthe River – a verdict prohibited shooting or hunting beavers and imposed a fine of 200 thalers – and those without means were threatened with being "locked in the stocks", i.e., tied to a post and put in the pillory.

Between 1883 and 1891, the Nuthe and Nieplitz rivers were extensively cleared and straightened, and the resulting drainage deprived the fishermen in the Kietz district of their traditional livelihood. The Alte Nuthe and other old arms of the river were cut off from the watercourse and silted up or are on the verge of silting up. The expansion and straightening of the Nuthe benefited shipping, and log rafting from the densely wooded areas around Löwendorf near Trebbin developed into an important economic factor. The development of new water level regulation techniques using weirs led to the end of shipping and log rafting. The containment and widening of the Nuthe in 1933/1934 prevented summer flooding almost entirely and shaped the current appearance of the Nuthe river with its characteristic rows of trees.

Since 1975, fundamental improvements have been made to the Nuthe catchment area. The drainage measures included widening and deepening the Königsgraben and constructing additional dams. After fertilisers, pesticides, and wastewater from pig farming caused severe water pollution during the GDR era, nature conservation and water protection measures at the beginning of the third millennium led to a significant recovery and improvement in water quality, which approached Class II in 2004, as indicated by a high occurrence of midge larvae.

The Nieplitz, which was also largely canalised in the past, still forms a near-natural river course in its section near its mouth between Grössinsee and its confluence with the Gröbener Kietz, with extensive reed beds and species-rich wet meadows.

== History ==
Coat of arms of the von der Groeben family

=== Foundation and first mention ===
==== Thesis of the founding of the house of Ascania ====
The originally triangular dead-end village of Gröben was, according to widespread belief, founded around 1170 as a colony by a family from Gröben who came from the Altmark region as part of the settlement policy pursued by Albrecht the Bear and his son Otto I. The origin of the name Gröben is uncertain. It may derive from the Slavic word Grob’n (grave, ditch, dam), in which case the wealthy Gröben family would have taken the name of their property, the village, as was customary at the time. However, there is also a theory that the family gave the village its name when it was founded around 1170. According to this theory, the family originally took its name from its settlement Gribehne (Grobene, Grebene), located three kilometres northwest of Calbe (Saale).

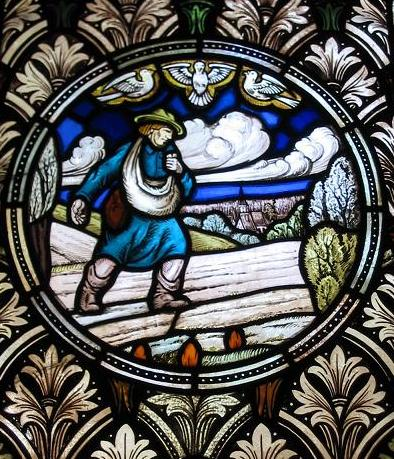
Church, window Gröbener owner

The first two Brandenburg margraves successfully attempted, through their colonisation policy, to Christianise the Margraviate of Brandenburg, which had been conquered and founded in 1157 and was still largely inhabited by Slavic tribes, and to finally stabilise it after various failed attempts by other German states in the centuries prior. Another important factor in the stabilisation policy was the call for Cistercian monks, who founded the Lehnin Monastery in 1180 in the centre of the Zauche region, around 30 kilometres away, and contributed significantly to the success of the Ascanian policy with their hard work and missionary work.

==== The idea of establishing an independent aristocratic rule ====
Helmut Assing describes a different sequence of events surrounding the founding of Gröben. According to him, Gröben was indeed founded by the "de Grubene"/"de Grobene"/"von Groeben"/"von Gröben" family, but this did not happen as part of the Ascanian land grab. Assing assumes that Gröben came under Ascanian rule in 1232 at the earliest and that before that, together with the villages of Siethen, Jütchendorf, Fahlhorst, and Ahrensdorf, and later possibly also Klein Beuthen, it formed a short-lived, independent noble dominion. However, Assing dates its foundation to 1190 at the earliest. Another important question here is whether the "von Gröben" were ministerials or nobles. Assing proves, based on the positions in the witness lists of documents in the area of the Archbishopric of Magdeburg, that they were noblemen who, under threat of losing power and influence at their ancestral seat in the sphere of influence of the Archbishopric of Magdeburg (i.e., not the Margraves of Brandenburg), left that ancestral seat near Calbe and established their own noble rule on the outskirts of Teltow. A few years later, they succumbed to the influence and pressure of the neighbouring Ascanian dynasty and became part of the Ascanian March in 1232 at the earliest. In 1232, an Arnoldus de Grebene (Arnold von Gröben) appears as a witness to a document issued by Otto III and John I in the group of ministerials. This is a clear indication of a relationship of dependence on the Ascanian dynasty. The fact that there are no known documents or registers from the period between 1190 and 1232 in which a "von Gröben" plays a role or appears as a witness also supports the theory of independent rule. The documentary mention from 1190 concerns Heinrich von Gröben's request to the Kloster Gottesgnaden monastery near Calbe to reserve a burial place in the monastery for himself and his parents. This request would seem to contradict his intention to leave his ancestral home, but it may have been part of his plan. The year 1170 therefore does not appear to be a viable date for Gröben's founding, especially since there seems to be no actual evidence to support it. According to this theory, Gröben was most likely not founded "as part of the settlement policy pursued by Albrecht the Bear and his son Otto I," but rather independently by noblemen from the archbishopric of Magdeburg, who later came under Ascanian rule. The Gröbener Kietz, founded by Slavs, is significantly older.

==== First documented mention ====
The first documented mention of Gröben dates back to 1352. After the end of the approximately 170-year Ascanian rule in the Margraviate of Brandenburg in 1320 with the death of Henry the Younger, the Wittelsbach/Luxembourg family took over the rule of the Margraviate for a short time before the Hohenzollerns arrived in 1415. In 1352, Margrave Ludwig II maintained a military camp near Gröben. In a document exhibited there, Gröben was mentioned in writing for the first time as "castris prope villam Groeben", meaning a military camp near Gröben. At that time, the Gröben family owned the land as far as Teltow and became one of the most important and powerful vassals of Emperor Charles IV in the Margraviate. The Land Register of Emperor Charles IV from 1375 contained the following entry:

In Gröben there are 32 Hufen, of which the priest has 4 and the Lehnschulze 4. Each [taxable] Hufe pays a total of 3 shillings. There are 8 cottagers , each paying 1 chicken. The innkeeper gives nothing. The entire village is owned by the Margrave of Gröben with all rights [as a fief].

H. von Gröben is the "noble landowner Henning von Gröben" from the village of Marzahn near Berlin, who is reported to have collected taxes for the Margrave around 1375. Henning von der Gröben is also mentioned as the lord of Bystestorff, now Berlin-Biesdorf. When the family (allegedly) lost 20 members in the Battle of Tannenberg in 1410, they left their ancestral home in Gröben and moved their main residence to Langheim in East Prussia. This paved the way for centuries of rule by the von Schlabrendorf family, who had a decisive influence on the development of Gröben and, for a time, also on that of the neighbouring village of Siethen.

=== 450 years of rule by the Schlabrendorf family ===
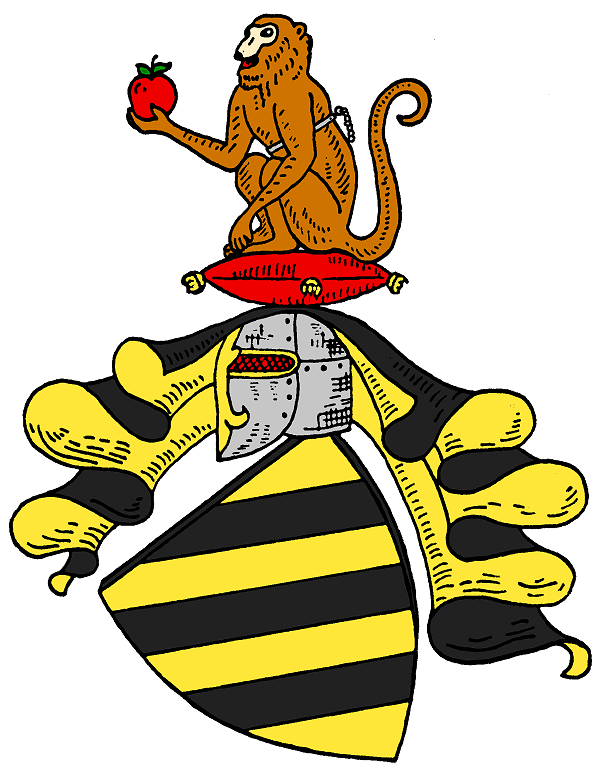
Coat of arms of the von Schlabrendorf family

With its location at the northern tip of the triangle formed by the Nuthe and Nieplitz rivers, Gröben belongs to the so-called "Thümenschen Winkel". However, unlike in Blankensee and Stangenhagen, where the Thümen family ruled the "corner" named after them for centuries, the von Schlabrendorf family held power in Gröben for around 450 years. Thanks to the preserved church records, a great deal is known about the Schlabrendorf era, making Gröben an example of a relatively well-documented, family-dominated, and manageable village history.

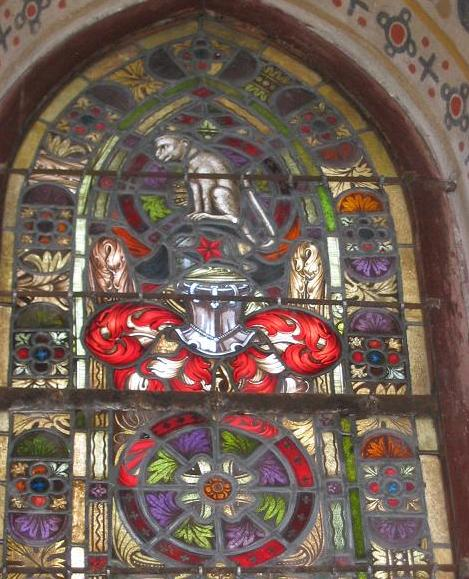
Schlabrendorf window in the church in Gröben

In addition to the power vacuum left behind by the departure of the von Gröben family, Schlabrendorf's rise was aided by the decline of the Wittelsbach and Luxembourg margraves' authority, which increased the importance of the noble estates. The Schlabrendorfs came from Lausitz, from a village of the same name near Luckau (Lower Lusatia). Other historical spellings include "Schlaberndorf" and "Schlaberendorf". In 1416, two years after Hans von Torgau defeated the Quitzowschen, a group of robber barons who had taken up residence in the nearby Beuthen Castle, Conrad and Henning von Schlabrendorf were granted Gröben and the neighbouring village of Kietz, as well as Siethen and Klein-Beuthen, as a fiefdom by Ludwig II. In 1550, Gröben became a knight's seat.

In the centuries that followed, the family produced Bishop of Havelberg Johann von Schlabrendorf (1501–1520) and Minister in Silesia Ernst Wilhelm von Schlabrendorf (1719–1769); it also produced "heroes" who emerged from the family in the First Silesian War (1740–1742) and the Seven Years' War (1756–1763).

The Schlabrendorfs were not always successful in their business dealings, and the family lost its possessions several times. Count Leopold von Schlabrendorf bought Gröben back in 1822 for the third time in the family's history. Theodor Fontane noted this in his Wanderungen durch die Mark Brandenburg (Walks through the Mark Brandenburg): "So there was once again a real Groeben estate, and one that had not been seen in the village for a long time, or more accurately, one that had never existed before. Order and customs had come with the young couple, as had assistance in word and deed, and insofar as it is in human hands to ward off misfortune and injustice, it was warded off."

The family's reign ended in 1859 when Johanna von Scharnhorst (1803–1867), Countess von Schlabrendorf and daughter-in-law of General Gerhard von Scharnhorst, sold the last remaining property to Karl von Jagow-Rühstädt, retaining only the Gröben manor house as her residence.

=== Von Jagow and von Badewitz as new owners (1859–1936) ===
In autumn 1859, Carl (Karl) von Jagow, hereditary master hunter of the Kurmark and member of the Reichstag, acquired the Gröben and Siethen estates from Johanna von Scharnhorst for 120,000 talers. The construction of farm buildings and a new distillery, the drainage of Elsbrüchen, and the transition to more economical forestry caused von Jagow a lot of work and considerable costs with little return, so that he sold his estates in 1879, which, according to the first official general address book of manorial estate owners for Brandenburg, covered 285.81 hectares in Gröben. Jagow sold Gröben (and Siethen with 1,206.83 hectares) to the Berlin merchant Badewitz for 180,000 talers. In 1897, the property passed to his son, the royal government assessor and lawyer Gottfried von Badewitz (1866–1944). The new lord of Gröben and Siethen financed the lion's share of the costs for rebuilding the burnt-down church in Gröben in 1909 and was elevated to the nobility in 1914. A striking coat of arms belonging to this family can be found in the patron's box of the church in Siethen.

Karl von Jagow had already tried in vain to increase the estates' profitability and therefore quickly sold them off. However, the new lord of Gröben and Siethen, Gottfried von Badewitz, fought hard in the first quarter of the 20th century. In the end, the family's efforts to get a decent return on their property in the 19th century were just as futile. The two estates never proved to be economically viable, so Badewitz had to use money from the family-owned Berlin bank to help run them. In 1936, the family sold the Gröbener estate and attempted to divide the remaining land into viable individual parcels and form core economic areas in order to save the estate in Siethen. In 1941, the National Socialists forced the sale of the properties there as well. The Gröben estate had been owned by retired captain Schrage since 1936, with a small part of the property, including Gröbener See lake, having been sold to a Dr. Lühr.

== Culture and sights ==
=== Village church ===
==== Construction history ====
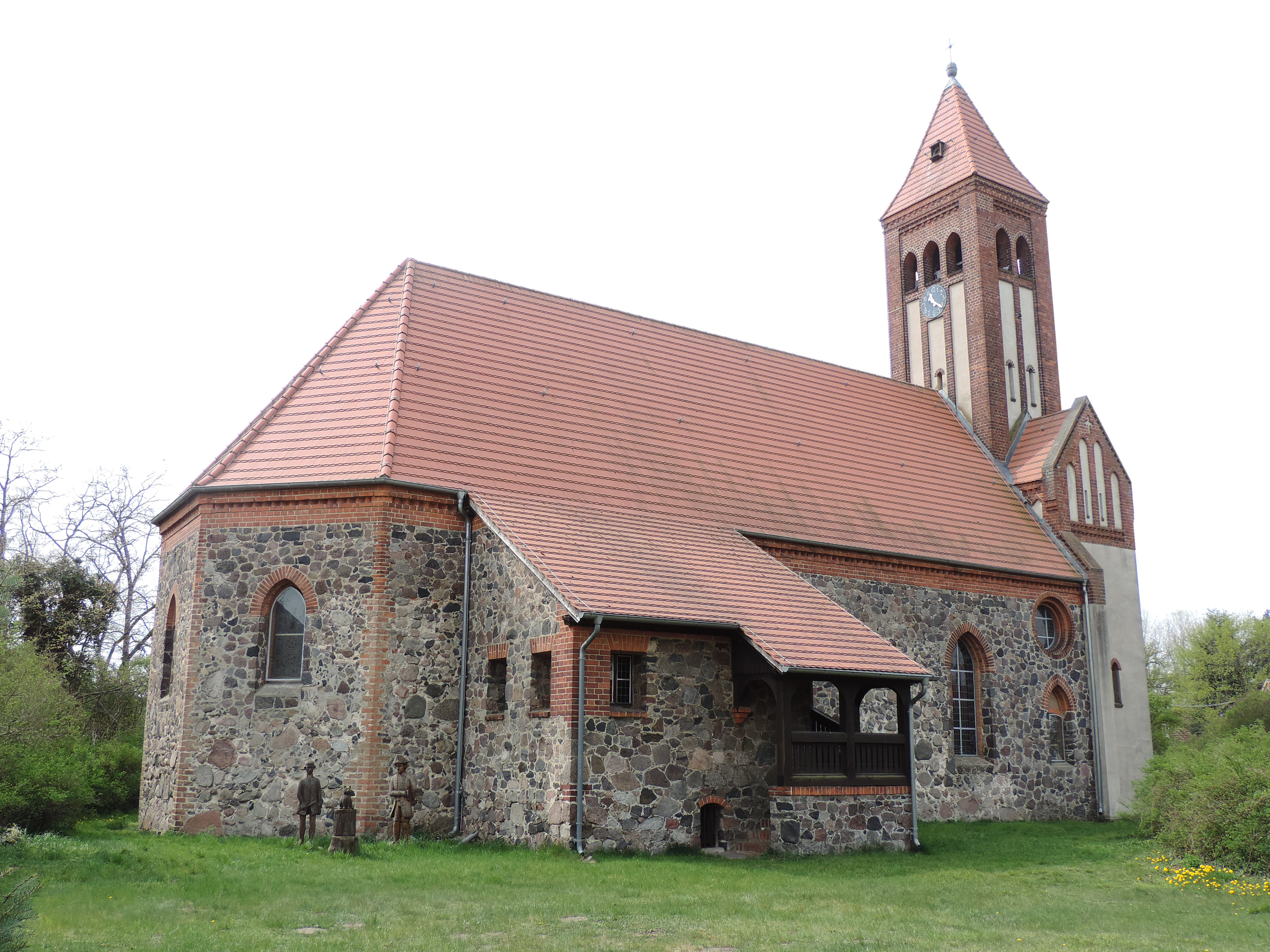
Gröben Church

The Gröben Church was built in the 13th century, renovated and consecrated in 1508, expanded in 1860, destroyed by fire in 1908, and rebuilt in 1909.

==== First construction, 13th century ====
According to the latest findings by Engeser and Stehr, the foundation walls that still remain today do not date back to the original 13th-century church, but to the building that was consecrated in 1508 and had probably undergone extensive alterations beforehand. Only a few fragments of bricks are likely to date back to the 13th century. According to current research, this first church was either a rectangular church made of field stones or a timber-framed building. There is no information available about the reasons that led to its construction in 1508.

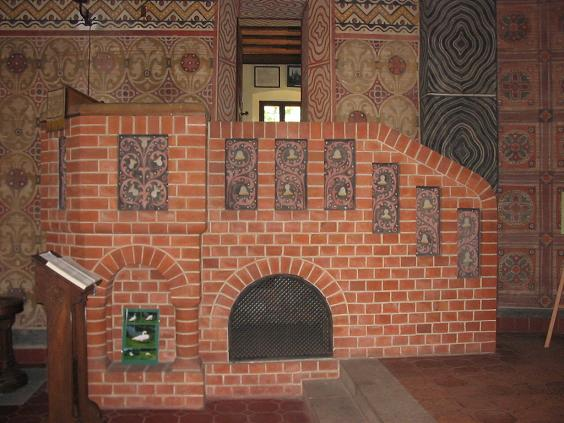
Gröben Church, pulpit

==== Second construction, 1508 ====
The second building, constructed in 1508, was a rectangular structure with a polygonal choir and brick edges, largely built from field stones. It had a priest's portal on the south side, and the gable of the west portal featured what was probably a wooden roof tower. The church was lower and around 7 metres shorter than the one standing today. In 1508, Bishop Johann von Schlabrendorf consecrated the church, and an altar was donated for the patron saint, St. Nicholas. Over the centuries, the Schlabrendorfs exercised what was known as "patronage", which included the rights and obligations of the founder of a church. According to an entry in the church register, the building got its first clock in 1598: "In 1633, the clockwork donated in 1598 was repaired."

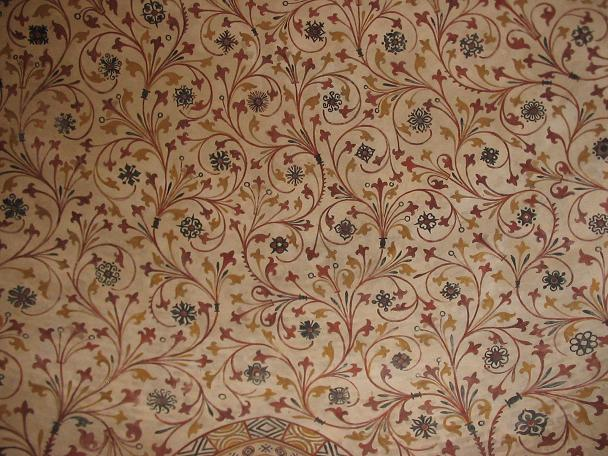
Ceiling ornament

==== Renovation 1858–1860 ====
The renovation between 1858 and 1860, financed by Countess Emilie von Schlabrendorf through her will, was carried out by the royal building officer Friedrich Adler (1827–1908). It included the construction of the vestibule, the gallery, and the seven-metre-long western section, on whose gable sat a small, recessed turret with a tented roof. Adler retained the fieldstone masonry and endeavoured to adapt new features such as the pulpit, altar, and baptismal font to the early Gothic style; however, all openings were given a neo-Gothic form. On Christmas Eve 1908, the church burned to the ground and was completely destroyed. To this day, the bells ring at 3 p.m. every year on 24 December in memory of the fire.

==== New building constructed in 1909 ====
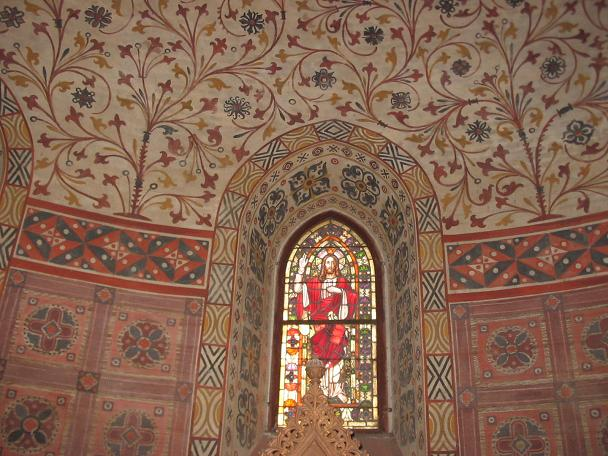
Choir with Resurrection window

Just one year later, the new church was completed, designed by architect Franz Heinrich Schwechten, who also designed the Kaiser Wilhelm Memorial Church and Anhalter Bahnhof railway station in Berlin. The brick building was erected on the usable ruins of the surrounding walls, meaning that the present choir and lower parts of the side walls date from the second construction in 1508, which in turn contains a few fragments from the first construction in the 13th century. The small roof turret that sat on the west gable was not reconstructed. The current neo-Gothic west tower with a porch, which was also added later, is slightly slimmer than its predecessor. It is divided by plaster panels, embrasure windows, and openings in the bell storey and covered with plain tiles. The gabled roof of the nave was partly covered with double shingles and partly with interlocking tiles. The sacristy on the north side was rebuilt, and the small south entrance that had previously existed was bricked up. The crypt under the chancel (apse), which had also been destroyed, was filled in. Franz Schwechten had the choir extended and rounded off, and the elaborate neo-Gothic forms were simplified.

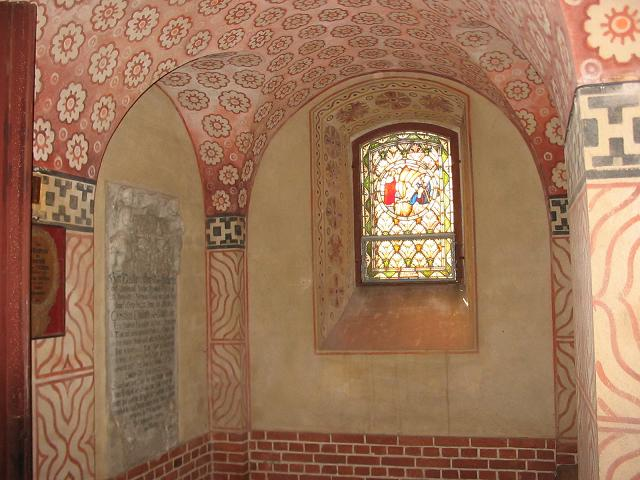
Anteroom with window The Kietzer fishermen and tomb slab Gustav Albrecht von Schlabrendorf

The construction costs amounted to around 60,000 gold marks and were partly raised through collections by the village population, with the majority being covered by the new landowner Gottfried (von) Badewitz. Empress Auguste Viktoria donated an altar Bible for the inauguration on 6 February 1910.

==== Today's interior design ====
The neo-Romanesque brick pulpit on the north side of the nave dates back to the renovation in 1858/1860. A passageway leads from the pulpit to the former sacristy, which now houses a small exhibition on the history of the church and the village. With the exception of parts of the windows, the rest of the interior dates back to the reconstruction in 1909. The vibrant colours of the ornaments, the elaborate frescoes on the walls, and the rosette-like decorations in the choir and the barrel vault were also painted by Professor August Oetken. A large wheel chandelier dominates the central nave.

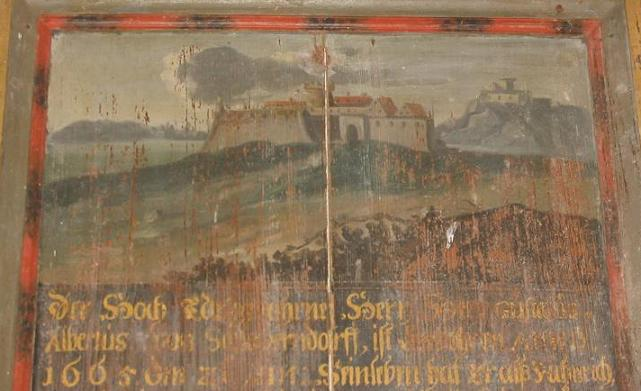
Image Battle of Budapest, 1686, in memory of Gustavus Albertus von Schlabrendorf

==== Stained glass window (altar area) ====
There are three historical windows in the three sections of the choir. The left-hand window, known as the Schlabrendorf window, contains the family coat of arms with a bishop's mitre above it. Several preserved painted panes have been incorporated into this window, which probably date from the second construction in 1508 and were donated by Johann von Schlabrendorf, Bishop of Havelberg. Fontane, who saw this window intact before the fire, reported seeing a bishop's mitre above the coat of arms. The middle window, the Resurrection window, probably also contains old parts from the early 16th century, testimony to the craftsmanship of the stained glass artists of the Mark Brandenburg at that time. The right window shows the coat of arms of the family of the canon of Brandenburg and landowner Wilhelm von Goertzke, who had held the church patronage of the neighbouring parish of Großbeuthen since 1597.

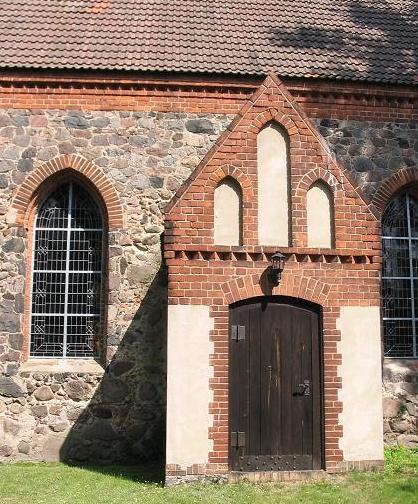
Former south entrance

==== Windows and grave slabs (vestibule) ====
The equally artistic stained-glass windows from 1909 in the vestibule show fishermen in the Gröbener Kietz neighbourhood on the right and, according to the text in the window, a "Gröbener owner" in the field on the left.

Of the ten Schlabrendorf gravestones that, according to Fontane, were walled up behind the altar and formed a "picturesque niche wall", only two slabs remain in 2004, housed in the vestibule. The epitaphs, some of which feature coats of arms and cherubs, contain inscriptions for Christina Elisabeth von Schlabrendorf († 1694, left vestibule) and Gustav Albrecht von Schlabrendorf († 1703, right vestibule, illustration below), which are still clearly legible today.

==== Plague and oven (entrance hall) ====
The church entrance is located in the west portal with the tower and leads through a small entrance hall. In this passageway, there is a memorial plaque on the left with a gradually fading battle painting in the upper part. Here, too, a Schlabrendorf is honoured who gave his life "for the fatherland", in this case Gustavus Albertus von Schlabrendorf on 15 July 1686 as an ensign in front of the fortress of Ofen in Hungary; the picture shows the mutual bombardment of the two bastions Pest and Ofen on both sides of the Danube near Budapest. The text praises fearless courage and heroism against the "hereditary enemy" in rhymes with phrases that seem strange today, such as: "It was only for his pleasure to hear Carthaunen banging".

==== The Gröben Church Register ====
The Gröben church register is considered the oldest surviving register in the Margraviate of Brandenburg. The first entries in the Gröben church register date back to 1575. In the years that followed, entries were made very irregularly. It was not until Pastor Thile I took up the records in 1604 that they became more detailed. This tradition was continued by Pastors Friedrich Zander, Felician Clar, and Heinrich Wilhelm Voß. In 1769, Pastor Redde took over the reporting, which ended in 1786. There are only a few gaps in the records towards the end of the Thirty Years' War. In 1911, Pastor Lemke revived the tradition and, with a break during the First World War, compiled a chronicle from files and church records until his death in 1934. The preserved church register is often on display at exhibitions, and a copy is kept at the Evangelical Central Archive in Berlin-Kreuzberg. The original is located in the House of Brandenburg-Prussian History in Potsdam, in the permanent exhibition "Land and People".

Theodor Fontane travelled to Gröben several times in 1860 and 1881 to look at the church records; he includes excerpts from them in more than ten pages of his Wanderungen durch die Mark Brandenburg (Walks through the Mark Brandenburg). Fontane summarises the contents of this "old, worm-eaten volume, bound, of course, in pigskin" with the following words: "War and plague, water and fire, crop failure and miscarriages. And alongside this, misfortune upon misfortune ... Fishermen drown, wedding processions are caught in storms, and in the winter twilight, lost travellers break into the barely frozen Lunen or freeze in the snow that has been blown together. Add to that murder and arson, stoning and beheading, and on every third page the old song of adultery and 'illegitimacy' of all kinds, regularly accompanied by pastoral and mostly invective-laden condemnations. But always in a lapidary style."

The book contains records from 1578 to 1769. It is now located in Ahrensdorf and is available online. A copy is available in the Gröben church.

=== Manor house ===
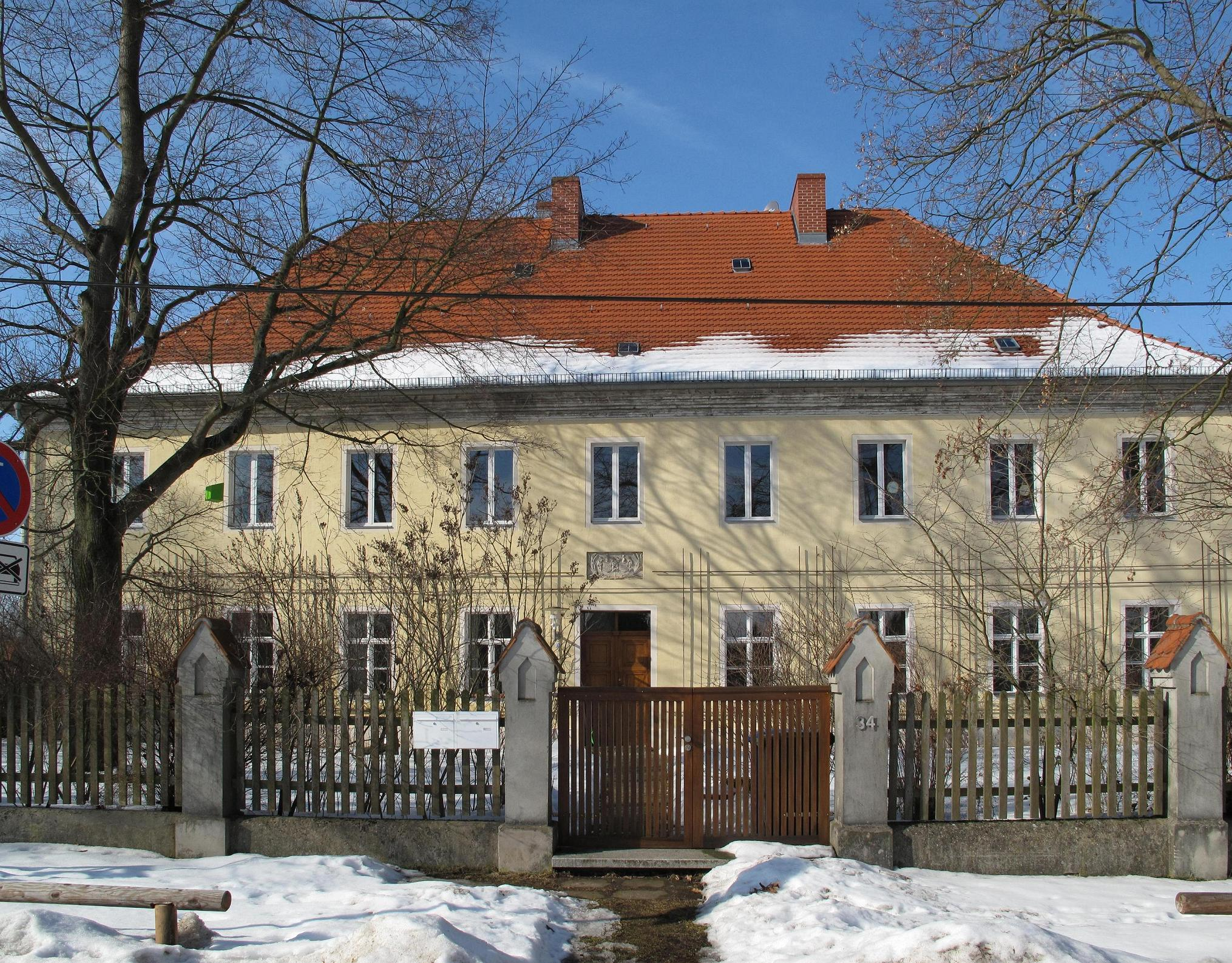
Manor house

The manor house was built in 1720 by Johann Christian von Schlabrendorf on the foundations of an older predecessor building. A coat of arms above the entrance indicates the year of construction. The building is a two-storey plastered structure with nine axes in length and two axes in depth with a hipped roof. A barrel vault in the basement has been preserved from the previous building. The main entrance is located in the centre of the building. Inside, there is a spacious staircase dating from the time the house was built.

The building was used as the residence of the respective landowners until 1945. After land reform, it served as an administrative building and a kindergarten. In 1994, the municipality sold the house to a married couple of architects, who renovated and expanded the building.

=== Parsonage ===
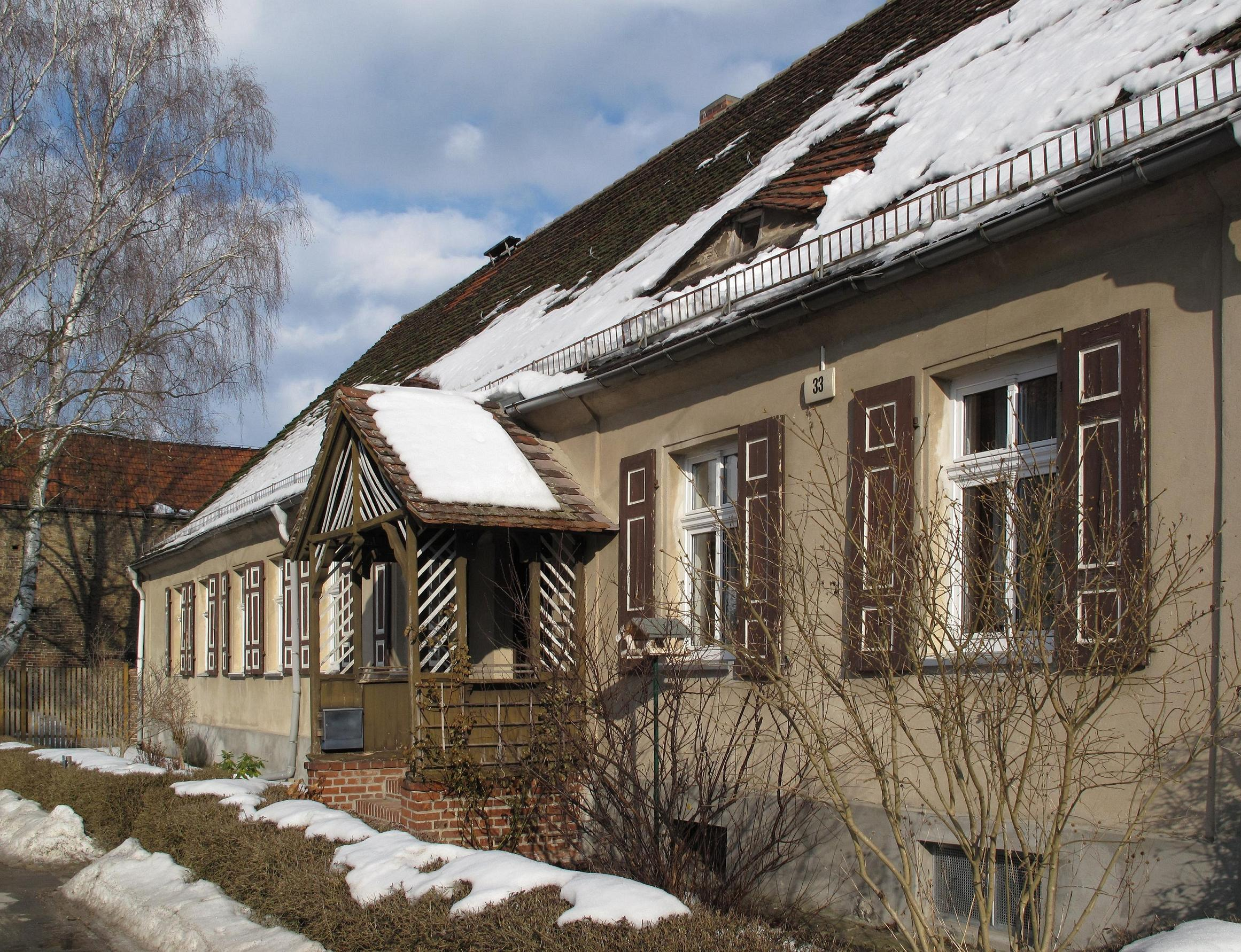
Parsonage

The basic structure of the parsonage dates back to around 1730. Extensions were added in 1870 and 1888. The farm building was erected in 1905/06. Theodor Fontane visited the parsonage several times to consult the Gröben church records, from which he reproduced excerpts covering more than ten pages in his work Wanderungen durch die Mark Brandenburg (Walks through the Mark Brandenburg).

=== Gröbener neighbourhood ===
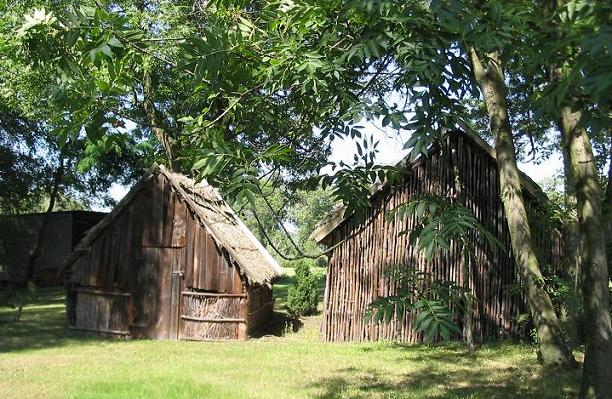
Old fishermen's huts in the neighbourhood

Around 400 metres behind Gröben in the direction of Nuthe is Gröbener Kietz, which was independent until 1896 and consists of a handful of houses. Around the year 2000, it was still referred to as Kietz on the place name sign; in 2004, only the inscription Gröben remained, and only the street sign Kietz still indicates the special feature that one of the few so-called "real" Kietze has been preserved here. A Kietz was a service settlement, usually located near a castle and mostly as a fishing village at river crossings. These "real" Kietze only exist east of the Elbe River.

With the renaming of Kietzer Dorfstraße to Kietz, the name Kietz was retained, but another historical reference was lost, as the street's former name was Gatze, which corresponds to the Slavic gat and means "dam". It is unclear whether a settlement existed in Slavic times, i.e., until around 1160. The neighbourhood is said to have been located directly next to an old German castle, of which nothing remains today. It is certain that the castle site was located around 700 metres west of Gröben.

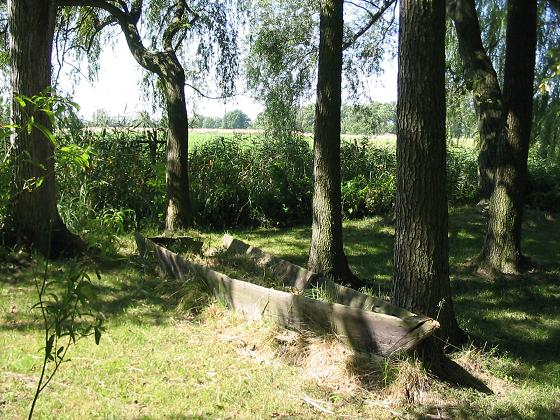
Rotten boat on the Alte Nuthe

The Landbuch der Mark Brandenburg (Land Register of the Margraviate of Brandenburg) from 1375 provided the first written mention. The only information was the amount of tax paid, which was 18 schillings. In 1497, a neighbourhood called "bey Gröben" was mentioned. The map from 1683 showed a castle mound surrounded by what is now the Alte Nuthe river. The present-day Saugraben, which runs directly behind Gröben and was previously known as the Gröbener Fließ, was created at the end of the 16th century to regulate the flow of water. A small footbridge was not sufficient for carts that had to drive through the water to reach the Kietz. It was not until it was incorporated into Gröben in 1896 that Kietz became easily accessible after a bridge was built. Further west, between Kietz and Nuthe, ran the Alte Nuthe, which has since almost silted up and was once navigable by barges. Today, several typical fishermen's huts made of clay, wood, and straw, as well as dilapidated barges in the meadows, are reminders of the fishing tradition of the past.

== Economy and infrastructure ==
=== Economic development ===
==== Village economy in the 12th century ====
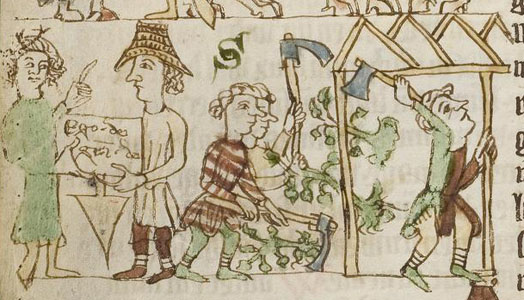
Farmers building a village. Illustration from the Heidelberg Sachsenspiegel (early 14th century). On the left, the landlord hands over the ground rent document to the village mayor; in the centre, a forest is being cleared; on the right, a farmer is building a house.

The settlers of the 12th century drained the first swamps and began clearing the forests. "The founding of the village," wrote Friedrich Wienecke in 1899, "was entrusted by the margrave or his trusted knight to a man. He was allocated specific land ... The remaining land was divided into plots of 30 to 60 acres. The hoof could be farmed by one family; its yield was sufficient to feed them and pay taxes ... It is unclear whether the hoof was transferred in exchange for money, but the settlers did receive advances for seed grain and travel expenses and were exempt from taxes for 3–5 years. If, on the other hand, they first had to clear the forest, they received twice the size of the hoof and 16 years of exemption from taxes."

These conditions were very attractive to settlers from Saxony, for example, as it was becoming increasingly difficult for younger sons to acquire land there. The initiative and energy of the settlers, often supported and guided by the Cistercian monasteries, led to a significant economic upturn within a short period of time. Trade and commerce flourished, and guilds were formed.

== Personalities ==
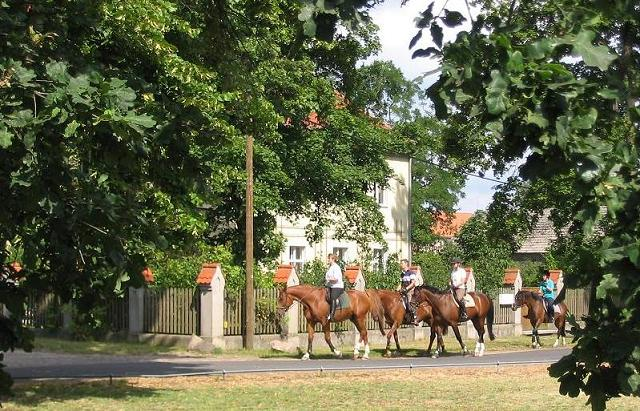
The village

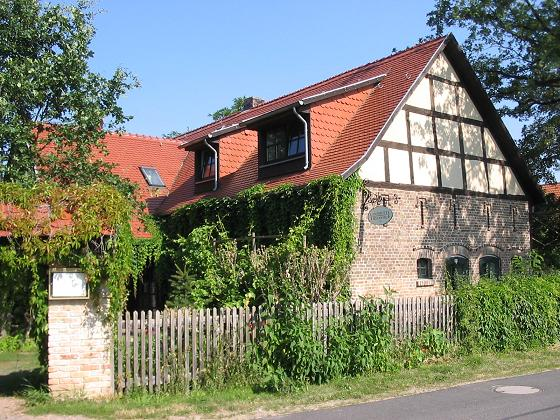
Country hotel

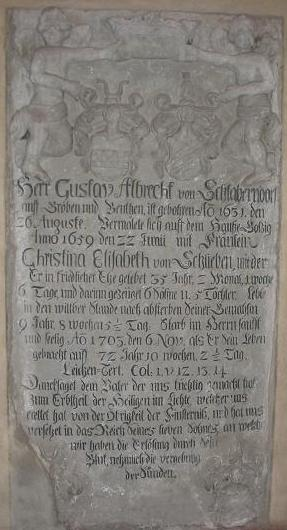
Epitaph of Gustav Albrecht von Schlabrendorf (1631–1703)

The von Schlabrendorf family shaped the history of the town for centuries. Important members of the family included:

- Johann von Schlabrendorf, Bishop of Havelberg from around 1501
- Johann Christian von Schlabrendorf built the manor house in 1720, which still stands today.
- His son Johann Christian Sigmund von Schlabrendorf, the "legendary" lieutenant, was killed in action at Mollwitz in 1741 at the age of 29.
- Friedrich Wilhelm Carl von Schlabrendorf, early 18th century in Gröben, cathedral canon in Magdeburg.
- Johanna von Scharnhorst, née Countess von Schlabrendorf (1803–1867), daughter-in-law of General Gerhard von Scharnhorst. Johanna established an orphanage (Tabea-Haus) in neighbouring Siethen in 1860. She sold the property to Carl von Jagow in 1859, just one year after receiving it from Emilie von Schlabrendorf, retaining only the Gröben manor house as her residence.

== Gröben as a film location ==
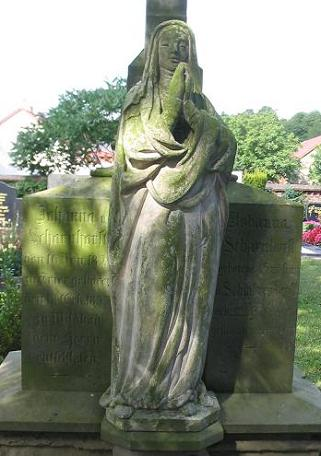
Grave of Johanna von Scharnhorst (1803–1867), Siethen Cemetery

Since the mid-1990s, Gröben, and especially the Gasthof Naase, has become the location for a number of films. First, parts of the television film Der Sandmann starring Götz George were shot there in 1995. Prior to that, Peter Zadek had already used the inn's hall for a theatre performance. This was followed in 1996 by Kurzer Traum with Inge Meysel and in 1999 by Mörderkind, both television films from the Polizeiruf 110 series. Since the mid-2000s, the Gasthof Naase has been transformed into the "Gasthof Krause" in a series of films starring Horst Krause. After Krauses Fest (2007), eight more films followed. Some scenes from the 2009 film adaptation of Fontane's Effi Briest by Hermine Huntgeburth, starring Julia Jentsch, were also shot in Gröben.
