= Grössinsee =

Lake in Brandenburg, Germany

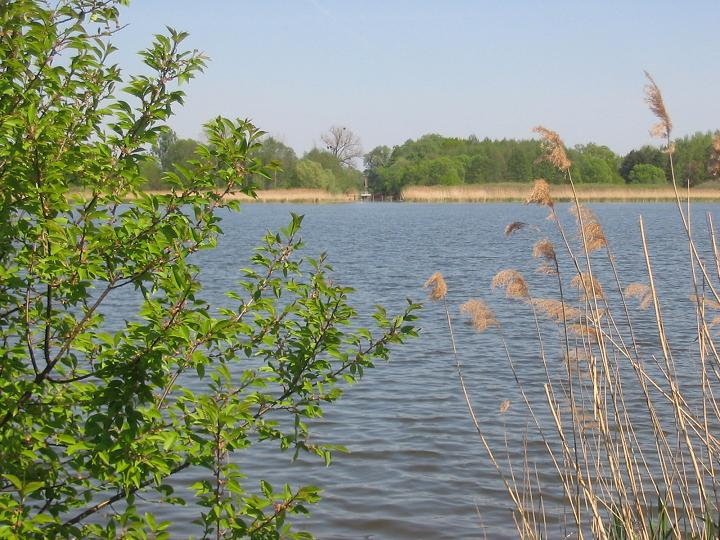

- Location within Brandenburg

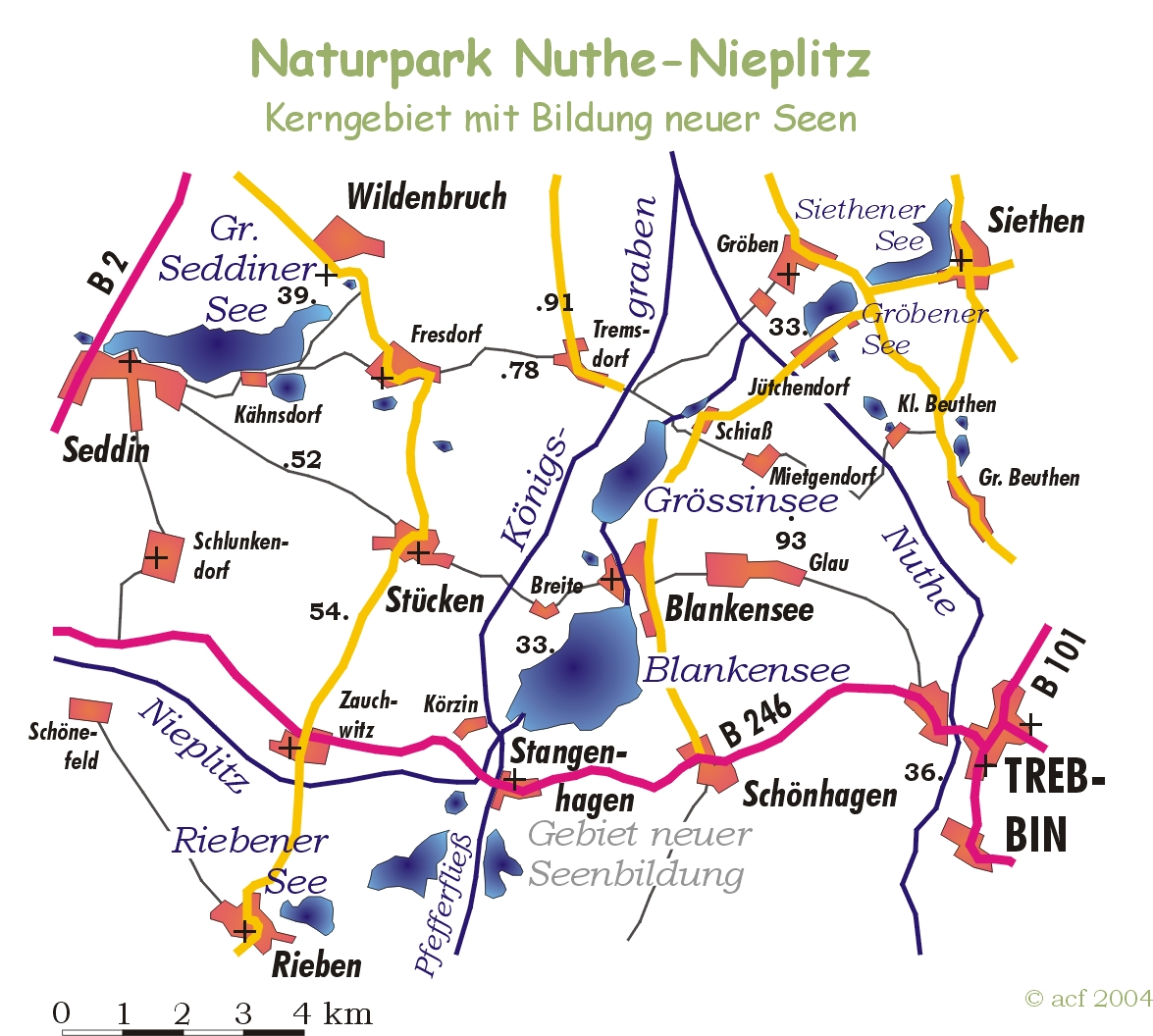
- Location: Brandenburg
- Coordinates: 52.25°N 13.13333°E
- Primary inflows: Nieplitz
- Primary outflows: Nieplitz
- Basin countries: Germany
- Max. length: 1.85 km (1.15 mi)
- Max. width: 0.75 km (0.47 mi)
- Surface area: 0.94 km^{2} (0.36 sq mi)
- Max. depth: 3 m (9.8 ft)
- Surface elevation: 33.2 m (109 ft)

Grössinsee is a lake in Brandenburg, Germany. At an elevation of 33.2 m, its surface area is 0.94 km². It is located in the town of Trebbin, Teltow-Fläming district.
