= Teltow (region) =

Geological plateau in Germany

Coordinates: 52°22′00″N 13°20′00″E

Teltow (German pronunciation: [ˈtɛltoː]) is both a geological plateau and also a historical region in the German states of Brandenburg and Berlin. As an historical region, the Teltow was one of the eight territories out of which the March of Brandenburg was formed in the 12th and 13th centuries. As a result of the Teltow War (1239–1245) the question of territorial lordship of the newly created heart of the expanding march was finally decided here. Between 1835 and 1952 there was also a county, Teltow district; in addition a town immediately south of Berlin, in the present-day county of Potsdam-Mittelmark, bears the name Teltow.

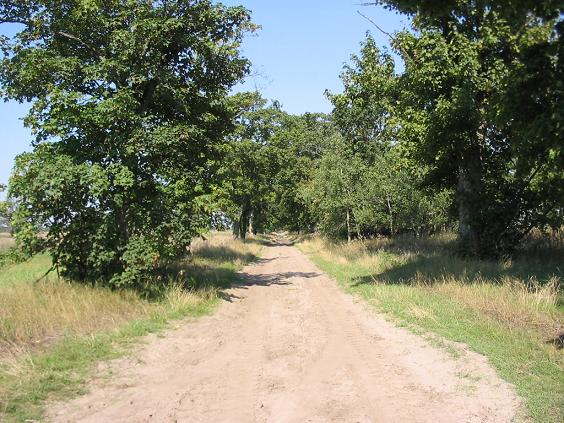
Typical old sand avenue in the Teltow

== Geography and geology ==
=== Boundary ===
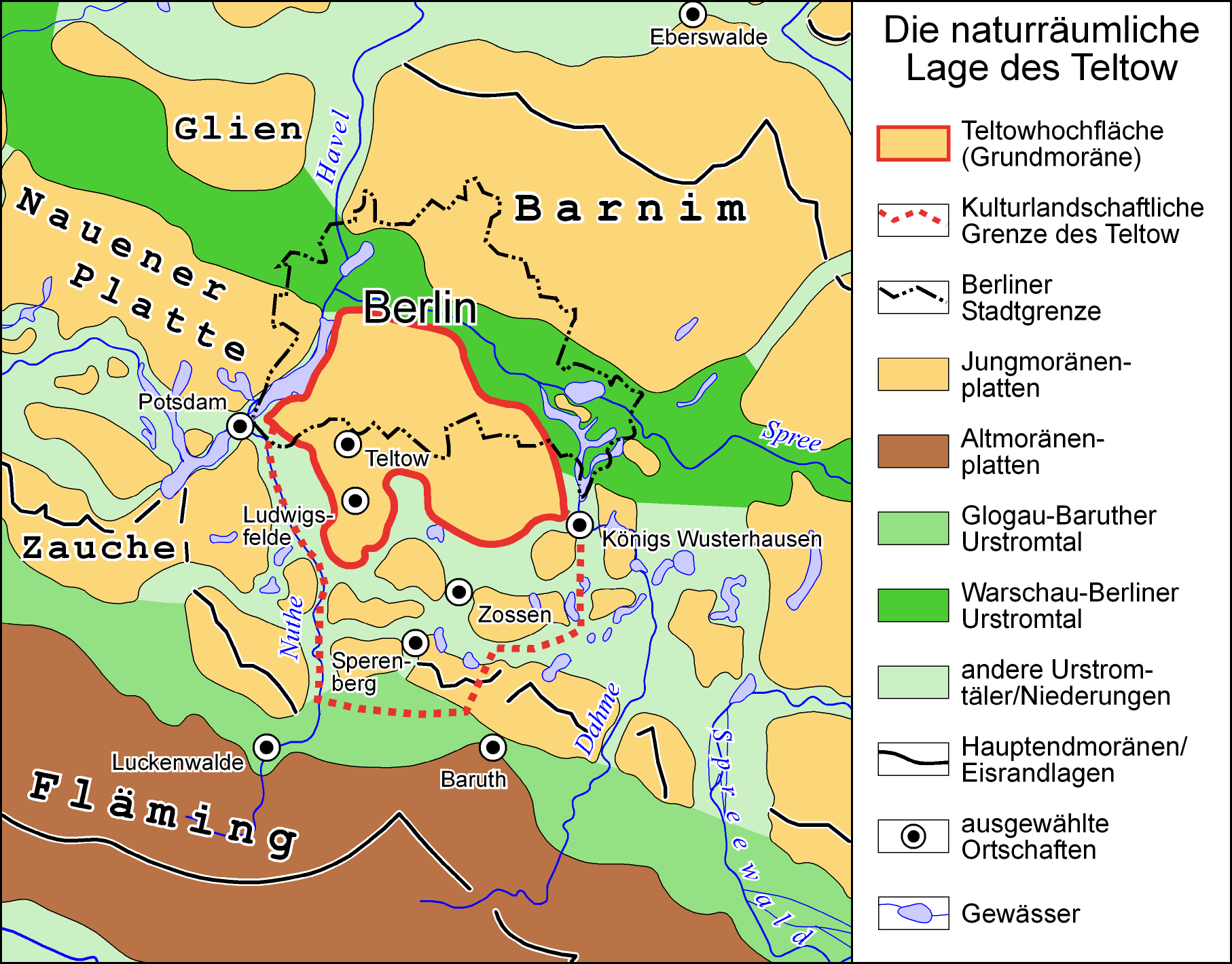
The natural regional location of the Teltow: the plateau is highlighted by a red border, the wider region by a red dotted line

The Teltow is not a unified region, either from a historical or a landscape perspective. The present-day term is defined by an ice age plateau that consists mainly of ground moraine elements. Its natural northern border is defined by the range of the Tempelhofer Berge, among them the Kreuzberg rising to 66 m (217 ft), along the southern bank of the Spree. To the east the borders are formed by the rivers Dahme, as well by the Havel and Nuthe to the west. To the southwest, the countryside around the Pfefferfließ is also counted as part of the Teltow, although it has no clear boundaries. The regional border in the south is unclear, because the ground moraines here were often eroded by urstromtal processes. For example, there are many small island plateaux. The boundary of the cultural landscape is general seen as the Baruth Urstromtal. Further south is the heathland of the Fläming.

The Havel river separates the Teltow from the Nauen Plateau to the northwest. The Nuthe-Nieplitz Lowland, an urstromtal feature, separates it from the sander plateau of the Zauche in the southwest and the Berlin Urstromtal forms the boundary with the Barnim Plateau in the northeast.

It is, however, disputed whether the Müggelberge hills, which are up to 115 m (377 ft) above sea level (NN), in southeast Berlin are part of the Teltow. From a geological standpoint they certainly are, because the hills have a similar development history. However, these upland remnants are completely isolated within the Berlin Urstromtal. If the River Dahme is taken as the eastern boundary of the Teltow the Müggelberge are neither part of the Teltow geologically nor from a cultural landscape perspective.

=== Geology, geomorphology and soils ===
==== Bedrock ====
One geological feature is the 80-metre (260 ft) high Sperenberg hill on the northern rim of the Baruth Urstromtal. Uniquely for Brandenburg, the hill is made of gypsum. The rising column of Zechstein-age salt has pushed through all the more recent deposits here to form a salt dome. Because all the readily soluble salts have been leached out, only a solution residue has been left on the surface of the gypsum. Rock salt is only found at a depth of 45 m (148 ft) (about 0 metres (0 ft) above NN). The gypsum hill is also of historic scientific interest, because it was here, in 1867, that the first borehole in the world to reach a depth of 1,000 metres (3,300 ft) was drilled. The geothermal gradient was found to be about 3 K/100 metres; this was also a first.

Sperenberg gypsum was mined from the Middle Ages to 1957 in several quarries. Other salt domes, which do not quite reach the surface, occur under Mittenwalde and the Blankensee lake. For the geological structure of the Teltow, they are of secondary significance, however.

==== Saale glaciation ====
While the deeply buried sediments of the Elster Ice Age have virtually no impact on the current appearance of the Teltow, the subsurface, sandy, gravelly sediments of the so-called Berlin Elbe course occur over a wide area. These deposits formed between the Elster and Saalian ice advances, when the Elbe flowed northwards from the location of present-day Torgau and crossed the area of the Fläming which did not yet exist. These sediments are of great economic importance, both as groundwater conduits and for the building materials industry. But they only outcrop at a small sand pit at Lindenberg near Jühnsdorf.

The old Elbe strata are overlain by the very thick (40 metres or more) sediments of the Saale ice age. These are usually the depositions of proglacial lakes or glacial till. At several points they even break through the Weichselian deposits and are immediately on, or at least very close to, the earth's surface (for example, in Glienick near Zossen). Because the Saale ice shoved the underlying sediments strongly, Tertiary deposits are found at the surface in places. For example, in Schenkendorf near Königs-Wusterhausen in the second half of the 19th and the first half of the 20th century, brown coal was extracted.

==== Weichsel glaciation and post-glacial development ====
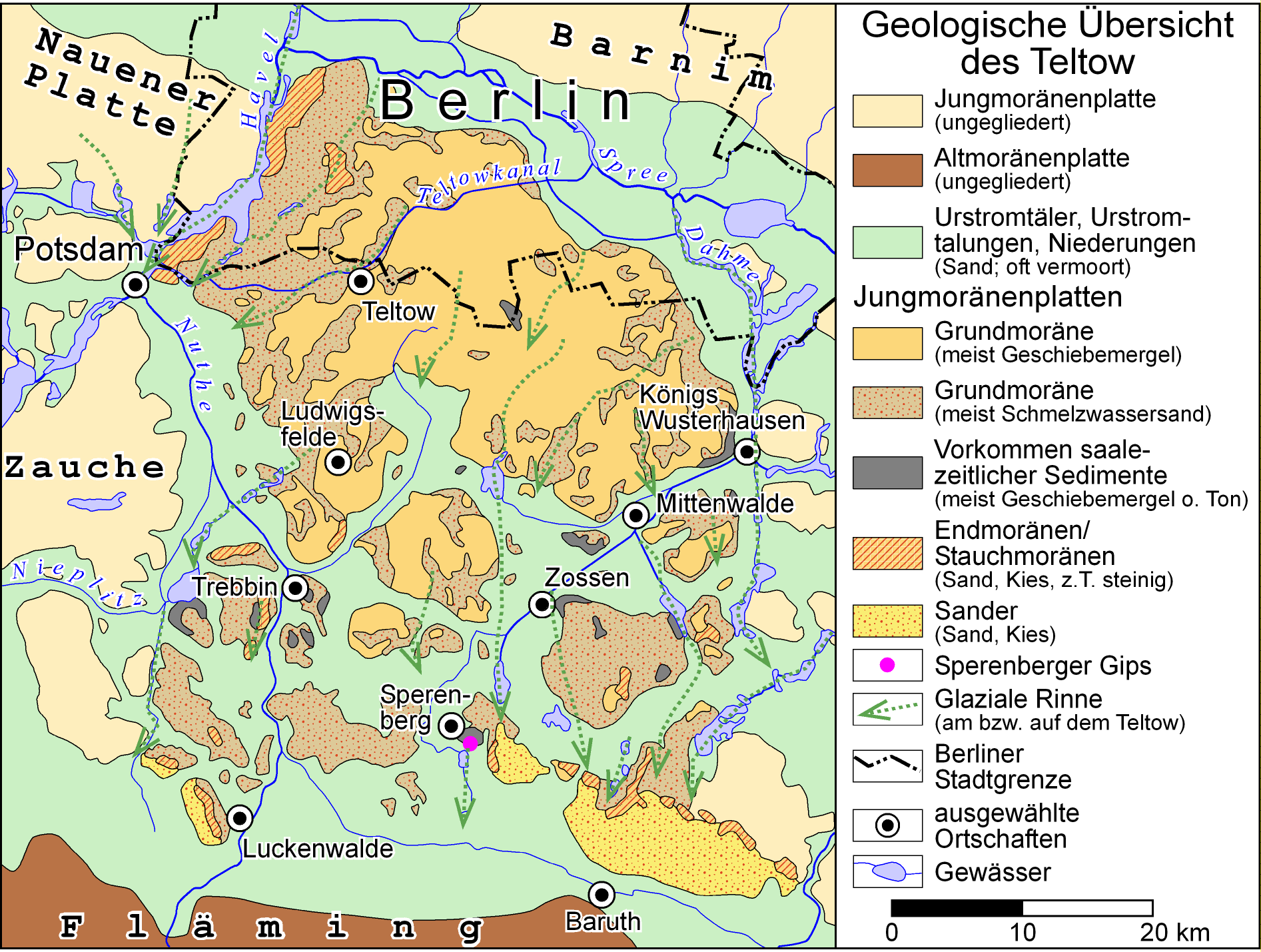
Geological overview map of the Teltow

Today's Teltow plateau in Brandenburg-Berlin was formed around 20,000 years ago during the Brandenburg stage of Weichsel glaciation. The Weichsel ice sheet pushed southwards right over the Teltow before reaching the northern edge of the Baruth Urstromtal, the limit of its expansion to the south. Terminal moraines can be found there, for example, around Dobbrikow in Luckenwalde (Weinberg) and near Sperenberg. However, the line of terminal moraines is very patchy and is traces out an ice front. To the north are ground moraines that have been deposited over a large area. Only south of Ludwigsfelde, does the contiguous ground moraine plateau of the Teltow begin.

== Literature ==
- Theodor Fontane: Wanderungen durch die Mark Brandenburg. Teil 4. Spreeland. Blankensee. Ullstein, Frankfurt am Main/Berlin, Ausgabe 1998, ISBN 3-548-24381-9. Zitat Seite 274.
- N. Hermsdorf: Zur quartären Schichtenfolge des Teltow-Plateaus. In: Brandenburgische Geowissenschaftliche Beiträge, 1, S. 27–37, Kleinmachnow 1995.
- Herbert Lehmann: Das Bäketal in vorgeschichtlicher Zeit. Verwaltungsbezirk Berlin-Steglitz (Hrsg.) 1953. (Broschüre)
- L. Lippstreu, N. Hermsdorf, A. Sonntag: Geologische Übersichtskarte des Landes Brandenburg 1:300.000 – Erläuterungen. Potsdam 1997, ISBN 3-7490-4576-3.
- Adolf Hannemann: Der Kreis Teltow, seine Geschichte, seine Verwaltung, seine Entwicklung und seine Einrichtungen. Berlin 1931.
- Carsten Rasmus, Bettina Rasmus: Berliner Umland Süd. KlaRas-Verlag, Berlin 2002, ISBN 3-933135-10-9.
- Max Philipp: Steglitz in Vergangenheit und Gegenwart. Kulturbuch Verlag, Berlin 1968.
- Gerhard Schlimpert: Brandenburgisches Namenbuch, Teil 3, Die Ortsnamen des Teltow. Hermann Böhlaus Nachf., Weimar, 1972. Zitat S. 187.
- Wilhelm Spatz: Aus der Vergangenheit des Kreises Teltow. In: Groß Berliner Kalender, Illustriertes Jahrbuch 1913. Hrsg. Ernst Friedel. Verlag von Karl Siegismund Königlich Sächsischer Hofbuchhändler, Berlin 1913. Zitat S. 212f.
- Werner Stackebrandt und Volker Manhenke (Hrsg.): Atlas zur Geologie von Brandenburg. Landesamt für Geowissenschaften und Rohstoffe Brandenburg (heute Landesamt für Bergbau, Geologie und Rohstoffe Brandenburg, LBGR) 2002, 2. Aufl., 142 S., 43 Karten, ISBN 3-9808157-0-6.
- Lutz Partenheimer: Albrecht der Bär. 2. Aufl. Böhlau Verlag, Köln 2003 ISBN 3-412-16302-3.
