= Bärwalde =

Bärwalde may refer to the following places:

== Poland ==
- Mieszkowice
- Barwice

== Germany ==
- Bärwalde, part of Niederer Fläming
- Bärwalde, part of Radeburg
- Bärwalde, part of Boxberg, Saxony
