= Dahme/Mark (Amt) =

- Amt
- Map of Teltow-Fläming highlighting Dahme/Mark
- Interactive map of Dahme/Mark
- Location within Germany Location within Brandenburg
- Coordinates: 51°52′N 13°26′E
- Country: Germany
- State: Brandenburg
- District: Teltow-Fläming
- Seat: Dahme
- Subdivisions: 4 municipalities

Area
  - Total: 437.95 km^{2} (169.09 sq mi)

Population (2025-12-31)
  - Total: 8,929
  - Density: 20.39/km^{2} (52.81/sq mi)
- Time zone: UTC+01:00 (CET)
  - Summer (DST): UTC+02:00 (CEST)
- Website: www.dahme.de

Amt Dahme/Mark is an Amt ("collective municipality") in the district of Teltow-Fläming, in Brandenburg, Germany. Its seat is in Dahme.

The Amt Dahme/Mark consists of the following municipalities:

1. Dahme
2. Dahmetal
3. Ihlow
4. Niederer Fläming

== Demography ==
Development of Population since 1875 within the Current Boundaries (Blue Line: Population; Dotted Line: Comparison to Population Development of Brandenburg state; Grey Background: Time of Nazi rule; Red Background: Time of Communist rule)

Recent Population Development and Projections (Population Development before Census 2011 (blue line); Recent Population Development according to the Census in Germany in 2011 (blue bordered line); Official projections for 2005-2030 (yellow line); for 2017-2030 (scarlet line); for 2020-2030 (green line)

Amt Dahme/Mark: Population development
within the current boundaries (2020)

Year	Pop.	±% p.a.
1875	15,996	—
1890	15,830	−0.07%
1910	16,596	+0.24%
1925	15,680	−0.38%
1939	14,859	−0.38%
1950	20,468	+2.95%
1964	16,156	−1.68%
1971	15,730	−0.38%
1981	13,874	−1.25%

Year	Pop.	±% p.a.
1985	13,573	−0.55%
1990	13,198	−0.56%
1995	12,483	−1.11%
2000	11,627	−1.41%
2005	10,720	−1.61%
2010	9,897	−1.58%
2015	9,426	−0.97%
2020	8,989	−0.94%
2025	8,929	−0.13%
