= Dahmetal =

- Municipality
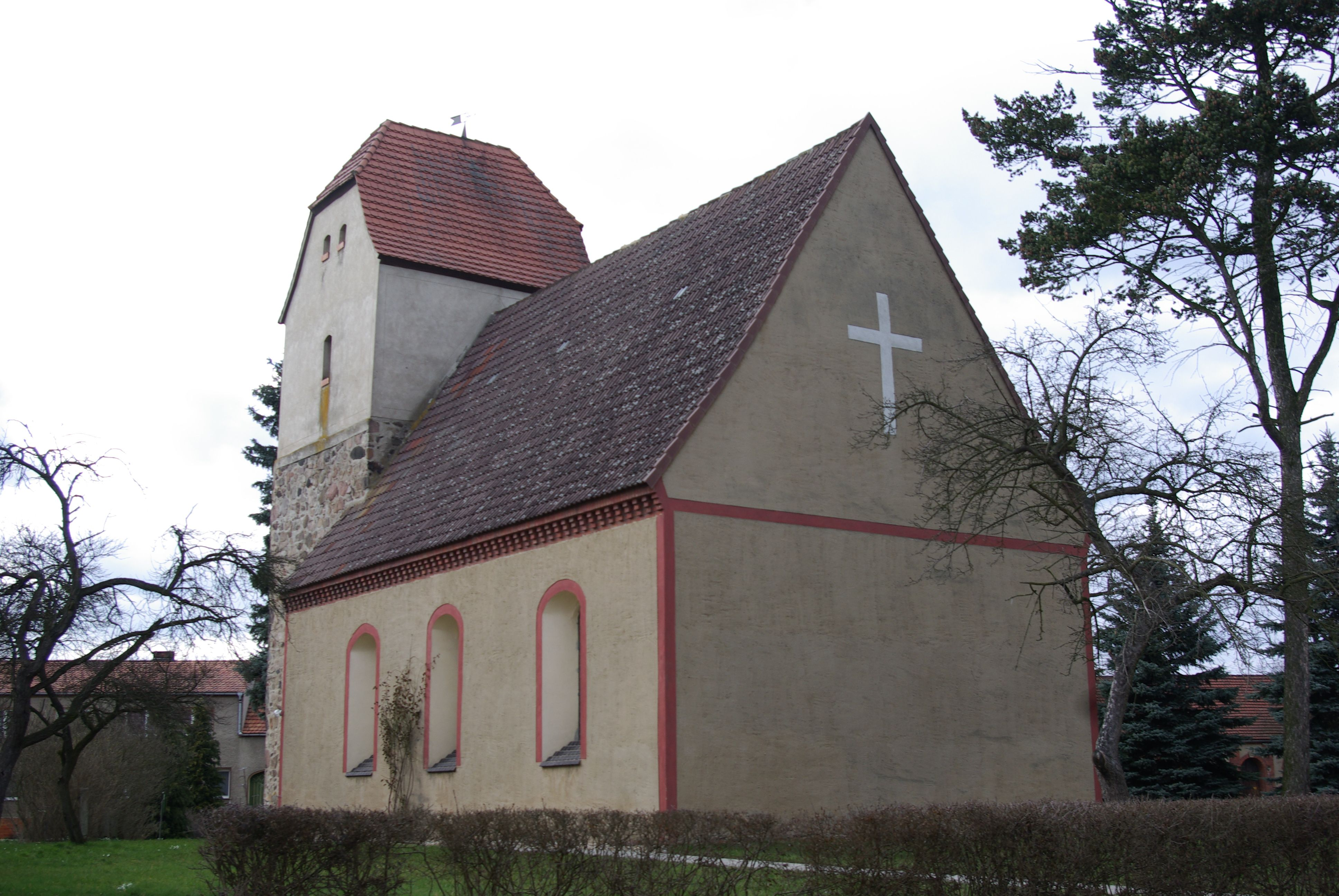
- The church in Prensdorf, Dahmetal

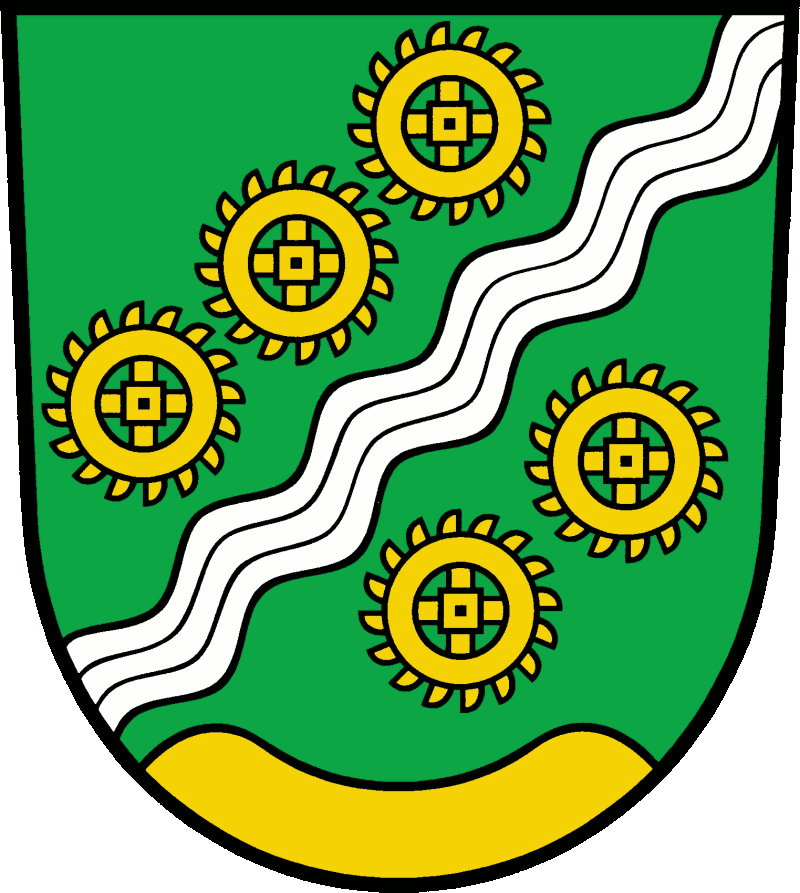
- Coat of arms

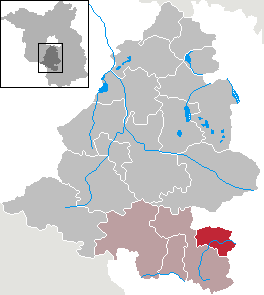
- Location of Dahmetal within Teltow-Fläming district
- Interactive map of Dahmetal
- Location within Germany Location within Brandenburg
- Coordinates: 51°54′N 13°29′E
- Country: Germany
- State: Brandenburg
- District: Teltow-Fläming
- Municipal assoc.: Dahme/Mark
- Subdivisions: 3 Ortsteile

Government
  - Mayor (2024–29): Andrea Müller

Area
  - Total: 41.48 km^{2} (16.02 sq mi)
- Elevation: 76 m (249 ft)

Population (2025-12-31)
  - Total: 424
  - Density: 10.2/km^{2} (26.5/sq mi)
- Time zone: UTC+01:00 (CET)
  - Summer (DST): UTC+02:00 (CEST)
- Postal codes: 15936
- Dialling codes: 03379
- Vehicle registration: TF

Dahmetal is a municipality in the Teltow-Fläming district of Brandenburg, Germany.

== Demography ==
Development of population since 1875 within the current Boundaries (Blue Line: Population; Dotted Line: Comparison to Population development in Brandenburg state; Grey Background: Time of Nazi Germany; Red Background: Time of communist East Germany)

Dahmetal: Population development
within the current boundaries (2013)

Year	Pop.	±% p.a.
1875	1,071	—
1890	1,093	+0.14%
1910	1,134	+0.18%
1925	996	−0.86%
1933	927	−0.89%
1939	867	−1.11%
1946	1,270	+5.60%
1950	1,203	−1.35%
1964	855	−2.41%
1971	803	−0.89%
1981	659	−1.96%
1985	638	−0.81%
1989	603	−1.40%
1990	595	−1.33%
1991	586	−1.51%
1992	568	−3.07%
1993	567	−0.18%
1994	557	−1.76%
1995	556	−0.18%
1996	542	−2.52%

Year	Pop.	±% p.a.
1997	557	+2.77%
1998	543	−2.51%
1999	550	+1.29%
2000	552	+0.36%
2001	558	+1.09%
2002	538	−3.58%
2003	542	+0.74%
2004	550	+1.48%
2005	546	−0.73%
2006	528	−3.30%
2007	519	−1.70%
2008	510	−1.73%
2009	488	−4.31%
2010	475	−2.66%
2011	494	+4.00%
2012	492	−0.40%
2013	487	−1.02%
2014	496	+1.85%
2015	488	−1.61%
2016	476	−2.46%
