= Annemarie Wolff =

German politician (born 1990)

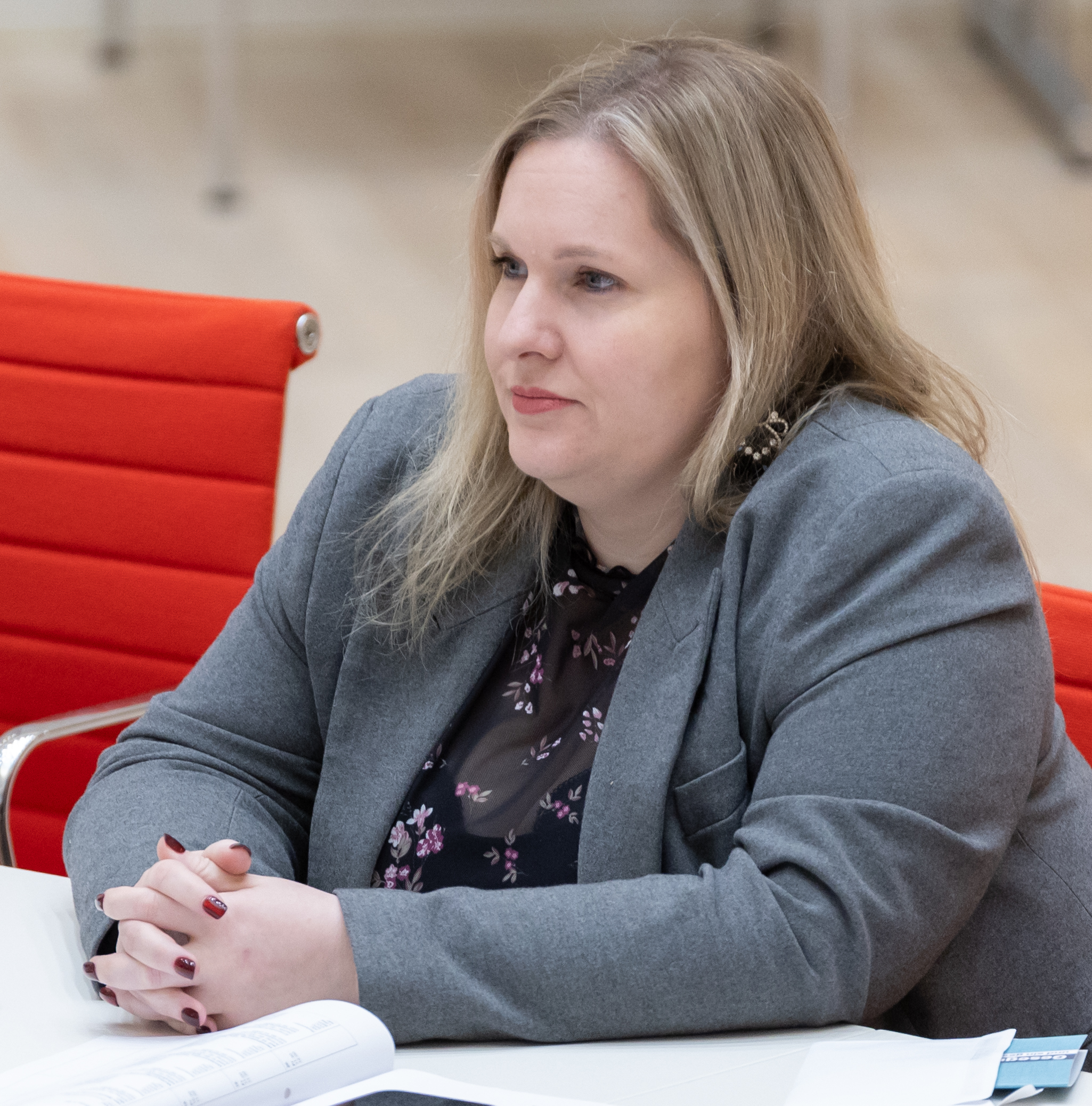
- Wolff in 2025

Member of the Landtag of Brandenburg
- Incumbent
- Assumed office 17 October 2024

Personal details
- Born: 1990 (age 35–36) Ludwigsfelde
- Party: Social Democratic Party (since 2011)

Annemarie Wolff (born 1990 in Ludwigsfelde) is a German politician serving as a member of the Landtag of Brandenburg since 2024. From 2022 to 2024, she served as group leader of the Social Democratic Party in the Kreistag of Oberhavel.
