= Siethen =

Coordinates: 52°17′N 13°13′E

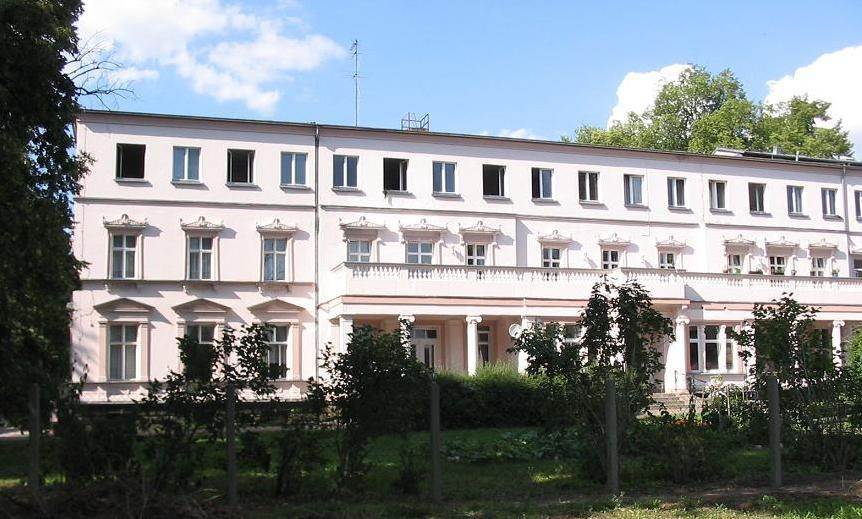
Siethener castle

Siethen is a village and a part of the city of Ludwigsfelde in the district of Teltow-Fläming in the federal state of Brandenburg. The name Siethen means "land of corn".

== Demographics ==
The village has a population of 600 inhabitants (2004), a size of 14,48 km^{2} and is located 3 km in the west of the town Ludwigsfelde, to which Siethen has belonged for several years.

== Facilities ==
Siethen's church was erected in the 14th century; it is located in the village center Siethen has a small castle, built in the 19th century. It was later on used as a hospital and refugee camp.
