= Pfefferfließ =

River in Germany

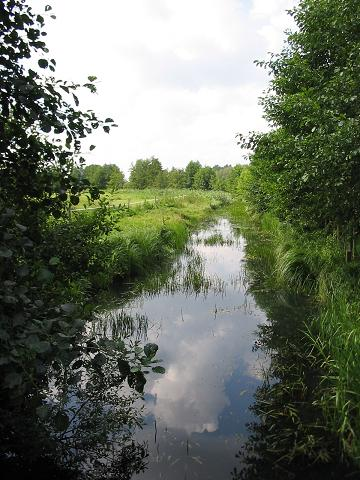

Location
- Country: Germany
- State: Brandenburg

Physical characteristics
- Mouth
  - location: Nieplitz
  - coordinates: 52.2183°N 13.0992°E

Basin features
- Progression: Nieplitz→ Nuthe→ Havel→ Elbe→ North Sea

Pfefferfließ is a river of Brandenburg, Germany. It flows into the Nieplitz near Körzin.

== See also ==
- List of rivers of Brandenburg
