= Ihlow, Brandenburg =

Ihlow
- Municipality
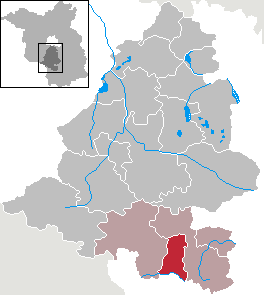
- Location of Ihlow within Teltow-Fläming district
- Interactive map of Ihlow
- Location within Germany Location within Brandenburg
- Coordinates: 51°53′N 13°20′E
- Country: Germany
- State: Brandenburg
- District: Teltow-Fläming
- Municipal assoc.: Dahme/Mark
- Subdivisions: 6 Ortsteile

Government
  - Mayor (2024–29): Frank Schüler

Area
  - Total: 47.54 km^{2} (18.36 sq mi)
- Elevation: 93 m (305 ft)

Population (2025-12-31)
  - Total: 633
  - Density: 13.3/km^{2} (34.5/sq mi)
- Time zone: UTC+01:00 (CET)
  - Summer (DST): UTC+02:00 (CEST)
- Postal codes: 15936
- Dialling codes: 035451
- Vehicle registration: TF

Ihlow is a municipality in the Teltow-Fläming district of Brandenburg, Germany.

== Demography ==
Development of population since 1875 within the current boundaries (Blue line: Population; Dotted line: Comparison to population development of Brandenburg state; Grey background: Time of Nazi rule; Red background: Time of communist rule)

Ihlow [Fläming]: Population development
within the current boundaries (2013)

Year	Pop.	±% p.a.
1875	1,455	—
1890	1,498	+0.19%
1910	1,432	−0.23%
1925	1,445	+0.06%
1933	1,337	−0.97%
1939	1,330	−0.09%
1946	1,822	+4.60%
1950	1,746	−1.06%
1964	1,263	−2.29%
1971	1,156	−1.26%
1981	1,009	−1.35%
1985	965	−1.11%
1989	924	−1.08%
1990	910	−1.52%
1991	893	−1.87%
1992	887	−0.67%
1993	859	−3.16%
1994	851	−0.93%
1995	847	−0.47%
1996	831	−1.89%

Year	Pop.	±% p.a.
1997	845	+1.68%
1998	861	+1.89%
1999	857	−0.46%
2000	835	−2.57%
2001	834	−0.12%
2002	828	−0.72%
2003	833	+0.60%
2004	848	+1.80%
2005	813	−4.13%
2006	802	−1.35%
2007	811	+1.12%
2008	803	−0.99%
2009	781	−2.74%
2010	773	−1.02%
2011	750	−2.98%
2012	750	+0.00%
2013	730	−2.67%
2014	705	−3.42%
2015	705	+0.00%
2016	707	+0.28%
