= Nieplitz =

River in Germany

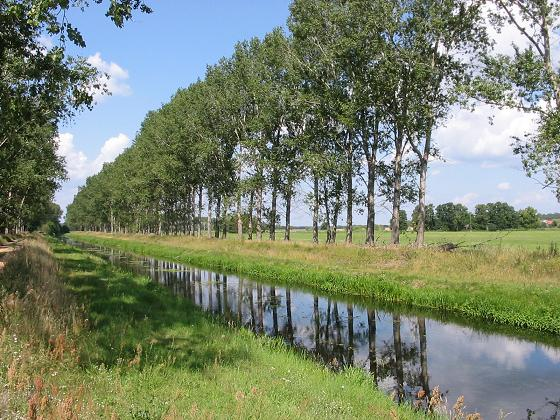
- Nieplitz near Zauchwitz

Location
- Country: Germany
- States: Brandenburg

Physical characteristics
- Mouth
  - location: Nuthe
  - coordinates: 52.2754°N 13.1588°E

Basin features
- Progression: Nuthe→ Havel→ Elbe→ North Sea

== Overview ==
Nieplitz is a river near Brandenburg, Germany. It flows into the Nuthe near Gröben.

== Origin and History ==
The river was first mentioned in writing in the 13th century as Niplitz. The name may have been adopted by Slavic settlers as a Germanic river name (Old High German Nebul- meaning "fog, darkness") with the Slavic suffix -ica.

Alternative etymologies derive the name entirely from Slavic, interpreting it roughly as "the non-navigable one"—in contrast to the Nuthe, which was up to 40 meters wide around 1880 and, before various regulations, was partially navigable.

== Ecology ==
=== Habitat ===
The Nieplitz meanders through wetlands and floodplains that are part of the Nuthe-Nieplitz Nature Park, a protected area established in 1999 covering 623 km². These habitats support diverse flora and fauna, including rare species like the brook lamprey, which thrive in the river's oxygen-rich waters.

Birdlife

The Nieplitz lowlands are designated as a European bird protection area. Seasonal flooding creates ideal conditions for birds such as white storks, northern lapwings, black kites, cranes, and kingfishers.

== See also ==
- List of rivers of Brandenburg
