= Trebbin =

- Town
- Coat of arms

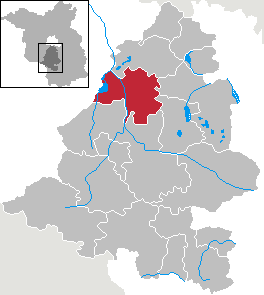
- Location of Trebbin within Teltow-Fläming district
- Interactive map of Trebbin
- Location within Germany Location within Brandenburg
- Coordinates: 52°13′N 13°12′E
- Country: Germany
- State: Brandenburg
- District: Teltow-Fläming
- Subdivisions: 12 Ortsteile

Government
  - Mayor (2022–30): Ronny Haase

Area
  - Total: 126.37 km^{2} (48.79 sq mi)
- Elevation: 39 m (128 ft)

Population (2025-12-31)
  - Total: 9,682
  - Density: 76.62/km^{2} (198.4/sq mi)
- Time zone: UTC+01:00 (CET)
  - Summer (DST): UTC+02:00 (CEST)
- Postal codes: 14959
- Dialling codes: 033731
- Vehicle registration: TF
- Website: www.stadt-trebbin.de

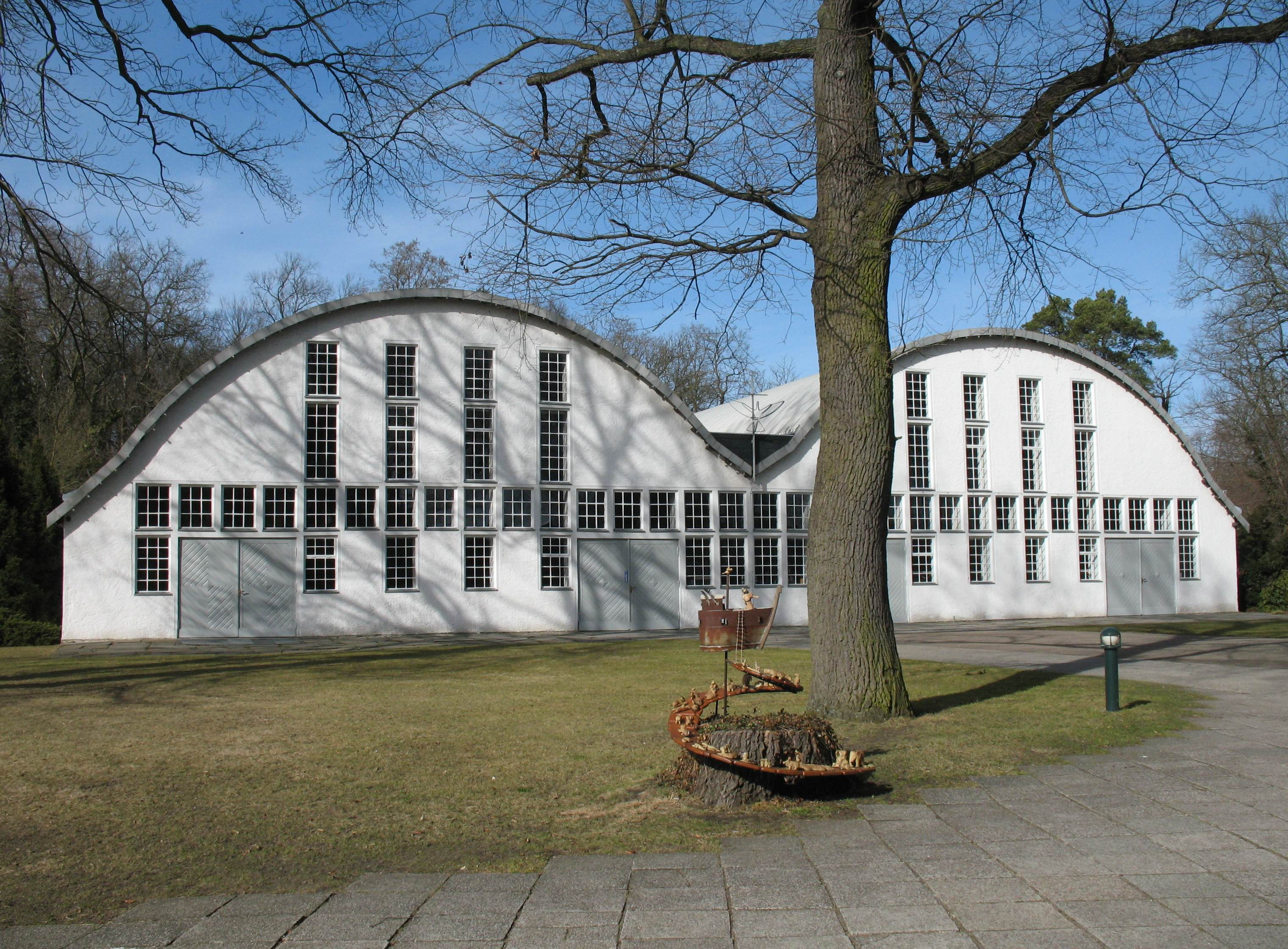
Church in Blankensee

Trebbin (German pronunciation: [tʁɛˈbiːn]; Polish Trzebin) is a town in the Teltow-Fläming district of Brandenburg, Germany. It is situated on the river Nuthe, 14 km north of Luckenwalde, and 36 km southwest of Berlin (centre).

== Demography ==
Development of Population since 1875 within the Current Boundaries (Blue Line: Population; Dotted Line: Comparison to Population Development of Brandenburg state; Grey Background: Time of Nazi rule; Red Background: Time of Communist rule)

Recent Population Development and Projections (Population Development before Census 2011 (blue line); Recent Population Development according to the Census in Germany in 2011 (blue bordered line); Official projections for 2005-2030 (yellow line); for 2017-2030 (scarlet line); for 2020-2030 (green line)

Trebbin: Population development
within the current boundaries (2020)

Year	Pop.	±% p.a.
1875	6,594	—
1890	6,770	+0.18%
1910	7,565	+0.56%
1925	8,087	+0.45%
1939	9,069	+0.82%
1950	10,401	+1.25%
1964	8,913	−1.10%

Year	Pop.	±% p.a.
1971	8,755	−0.26%
1981	8,316	−0.51%
1985	8,301	−0.05%
1990	8,089	−0.52%
1995	8,360	+0.66%
2000	9,155	+1.83%
2005	9,272	+0.25%

Year	Pop.	±% p.a.
2010	9,273	+0.00%
2015	9,394	+0.26%
2016	9,474	+0.85%
2017	9,433	−0.43%
2018	9,541	+1.14%
2019	9,639	+1.03%
2020	9,728	+0.92%

== Mayor ==
Since 2003 the mayor is Thomas Berger (CDU). He was re-elected in September 2014.

== Twin towns ==
- (United Kingdom) Bognor Regis (England, UK)
- Weil am Rhein (Germany)

== See also ==
- Grössinsee
