= Niederer Fläming =

- Municipality
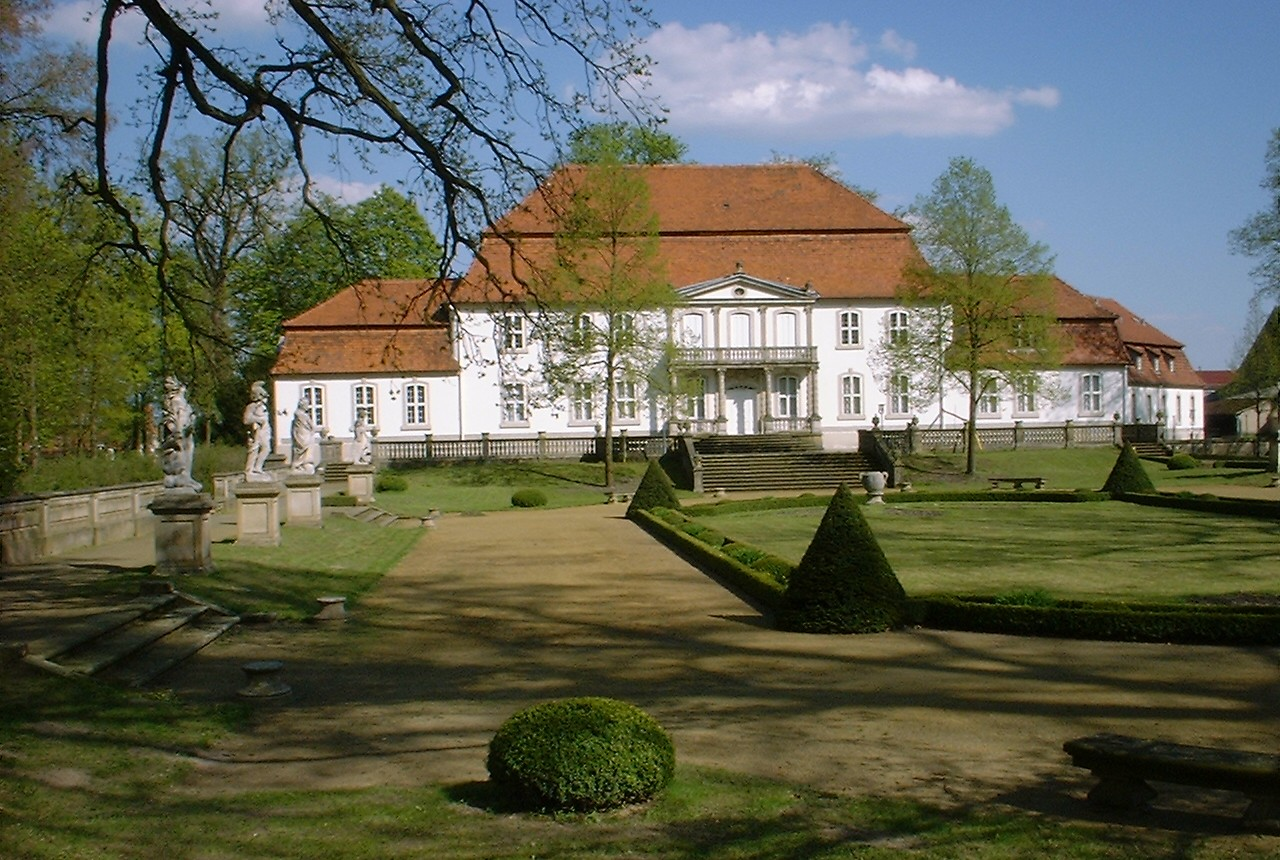
- Wiepersdorf manor

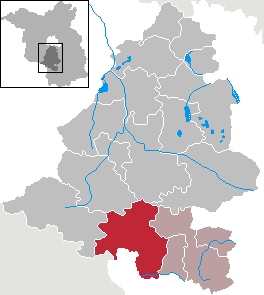
- Location of Niederer Fläming within Teltow-Fläming district
- Interactive map of Niederer Fläming
- Location within Germany Location within Brandenburg
- Coordinates: 51°54′N 13°12′E
- Country: Germany
- State: Brandenburg
- District: Teltow-Fläming
- Municipal assoc.: Dahme/Mark
- Subdivisions: 23 Ortsteile

Government
  - Mayor (2024–29): Matthias Wäsche

Area
  - Total: 186.11 km^{2} (71.86 sq mi)
- Elevation: 80–132 m (262–433 ft)

Population (2025-12-31)
  - Total: 2,968
  - Density: 15.95/km^{2} (41.30/sq mi)
- Time zone: UTC+01:00 (CET)
  - Summer (DST): UTC+02:00 (CEST)
- Postal codes: 14913
- Dialling codes: 033746
- Vehicle registration: TF
- Website: www.gemeinde-niederer-flaeming.de

Niederer Fläming (German pronunciation: [ˈniːdəʁɐ ˈflɛːmɪŋ], lit. 'Lower Fläming') is a municipality in the Teltow-Fläming district of Brandenburg, Germany.

== Demography ==
Development of Population since 1875 within the Current Boundaries (Blue Line: Population; Dotted Line: Comparison to Population Development of Brandenburg state; Grey Background: Time of Nazi rule; Red Background: Time of Communist rule)

Recent Population Development and Projections (Population Development before Census 2011 (blue line); Recent Population Development according to the Census in Germany in 2011 (blue bordered line); Projection by the Brandenburg state for 2005-2030 (yellow line); Projection by the Brandenburg state for 2014-2030 (red line)

Niederer Fläming: Population development
within the current boundaries (2017)

Year	Pop.	±% p.a.
1875	4,796	—
1890	4,884	+0.12%
1910	5,054	+0.17%
1925	4,936	−0.16%
1933	4,939	+0.01%
1939	4,719	−0.76%
1946	7,077	+5.96%
1950	6,843	−0.84%
1964	5,282	−1.83%
1971	5,163	−0.32%
1981	4,596	−1.16%
1985	4,543	−0.29%
1989	4,556	+0.07%
1990	4,514	−0.92%
1991	4,439	−1.66%

Year	Pop.	±% p.a.
1992	4,542	+2.32%
1993	4,487	−1.21%
1994	4,465	−0.49%
1995	4,400	−1.46%
1996	4,373	−0.61%
1997	4,307	−1.51%
1998	4,195	−2.60%
1999	4,088	−2.55%
2000	4,021	−1.64%
2001	3,945	−1.89%
2002	3,884	−1.55%
2003	3,790	−2.42%
2004	3,661	−3.40%
2005	3,571	−2.46%
2006	3,507	−1.79%

Year	Pop.	±% p.a.
2007	3,439	−1.94%
2008	3,383	−1.63%
2009	3,335	−1.42%
2010	3,273	−1.86%
2011	3,222	−1.56%
2012	3,214	−0.25%
2013	3,184	−0.93%
2014	3,186	+0.06%
2015	3,160	−0.82%
2016	3,093	−2.12%
2017	3,086	−0.23%
2018	3,058	−0.91%
2019	3,037	−0.69%
