= Ludwigsfelde =

- Town
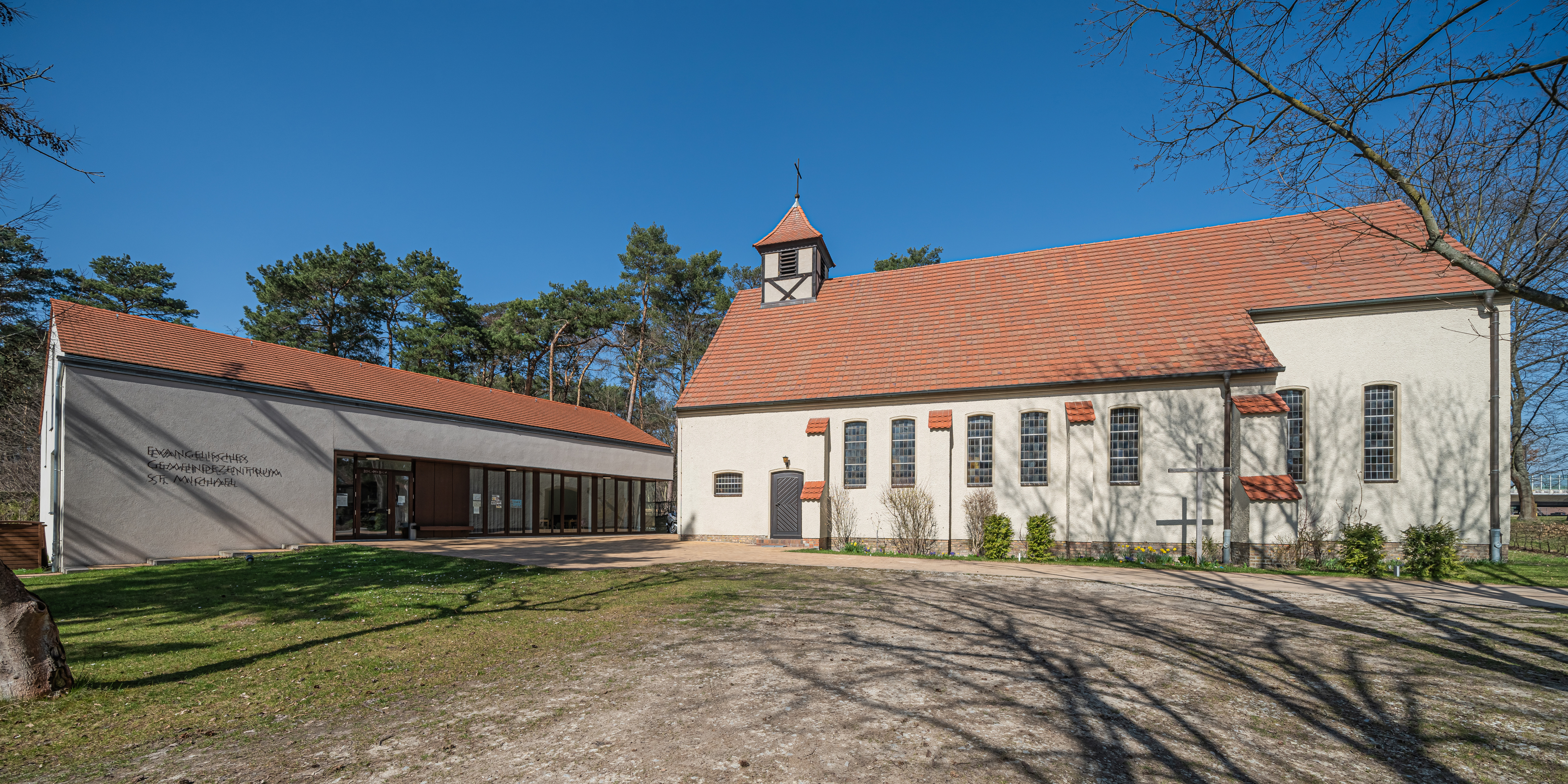

- Coat of arms

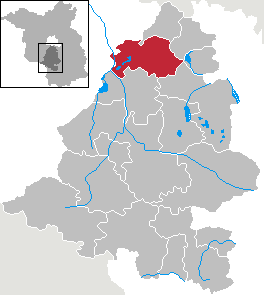
- Location of Ludwigsfelde within Teltow-Fläming district
- Interactive map of Ludwigsfelde
- Location within Germany Location within Brandenburg
- Coordinates: 52°17′59″N 13°16′00″E
- Country: Germany
- State: Brandenburg
- District: Teltow-Fläming

Government
  - Mayor (2023–31): Andreas Igel (SPD)

Area
  - Total: 109.98 km^{2} (42.46 sq mi)
- Elevation: 43 m (141 ft)

Population (2025-12-31)
  - Total: 29,635
  - Density: 269.46/km^{2} (697.89/sq mi)
- Time zone: UTC+01:00 (CET)
  - Summer (DST): UTC+02:00 (CEST)
- Postal codes: 14974
- Dialling codes: 03378
- Vehicle registration: TF
- Website: www.ludwigsfelde.de

Ludwigsfelde (German pronunciation: [ˌluːtvɪçsˈfɛldə]) is a town in the north of the district Teltow-Fläming in Brandenburg.

== Geography ==
=== Location ===
The town is located south of Berlin in the district Teltow-Fläming on the plateau of Teltow. In earlier times, it was part of the district Zossen.

=== Parts of the town ===
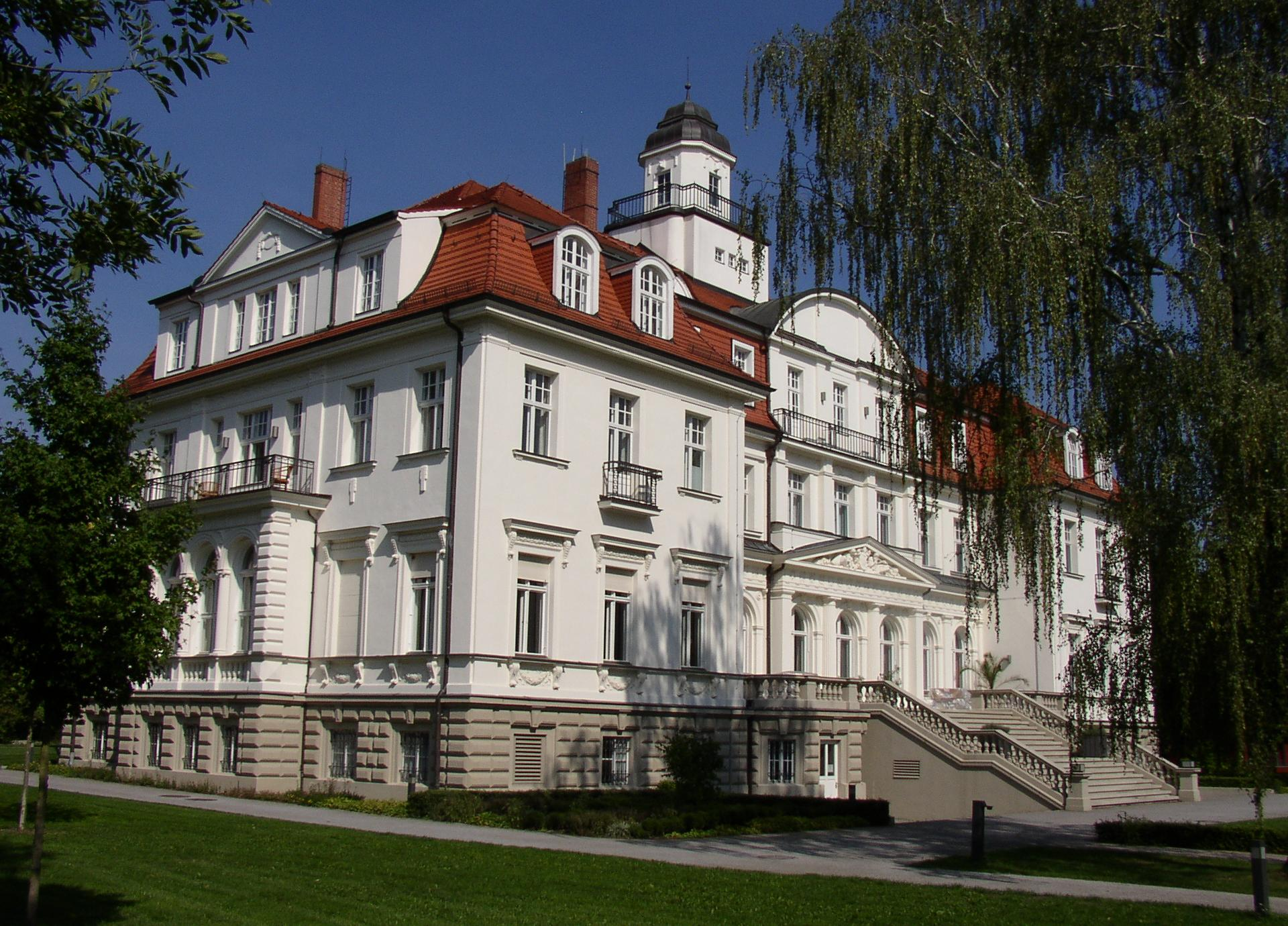
Genshagen Palace

Since 1997/2003 the following villages are part of the city:

- Ahrensdorf
- Genshagen (with Genshagen Palace)
- Gröben
- Groß Schulzendorf
- Jütchendorf
- Kerzendorf
- Löwenbruch
- Mietgendorf
- Schiaß
- Siethen
- Wietstock

== Demography ==
Development of population since 1875 within the current boundaries (blue line: population; dotted line: comparison to population development of Brandenburg state; grey background: time of Nazi rule; red background: time of communist rule)

Recent population development and projections (population development before census 2011 (blue line); recent population development according to the census in Germany in 2011 (blue bordered line); projection by the Brandenburg state for 2005-2030 (yellow line); projection for 2017-2030 (scarlet line); projection for 2020-2030 (green line)

Ludwigsfelde: Population development
within the current boundaries (2020)

Year	Pop.	±% p.a.
1875	2,979	—
1890	3,188	+0.45%
1910	3,548	+0.54%
1925	3,856	+0.56%
1939	7,110	+4.47%
1950	10,221	+3.35%
1964	15,440	+2.99%

Year	Pop.	±% p.a.
1971	19,912	+3.70%
1981	23,380	+1.62%
1985	24,830	+1.52%
1990	24,817	−0.01%
1995	23,590	−1.01%
2000	24,183	+0.50%
2005	24,273	+0.07%

Year	Pop.	±% p.a.
2010	24,044	−0.19%
2015	25,030	+0.81%
2016	25,245	+0.86%
2017	25,665	+1.66%
2018	26,112	+1.74%
2019	26,800	+2.63%
2020	26,936	+0.51%

== History ==
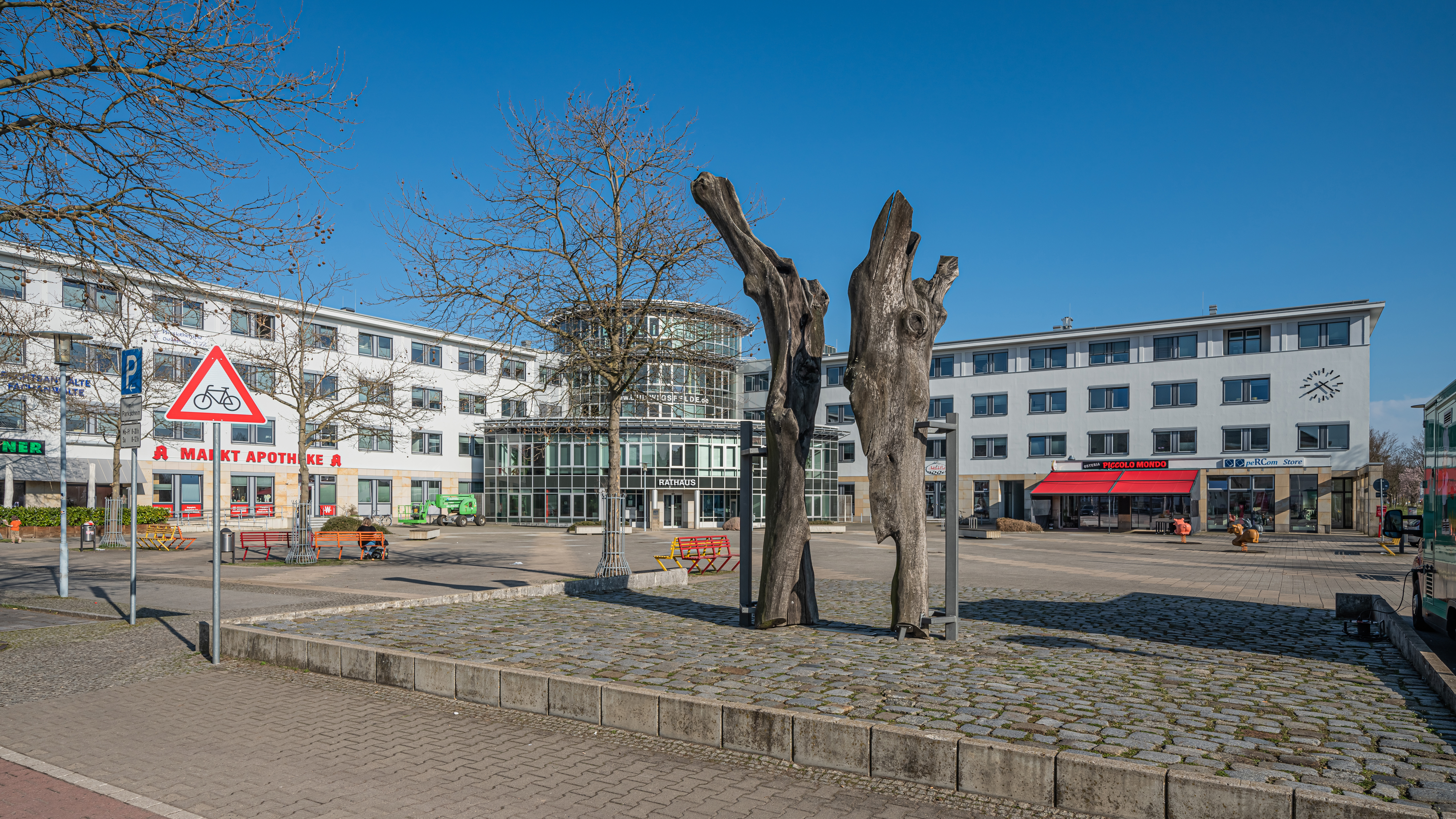
Town hall, inaugurated in 1996, with sculpture Stundeneiche

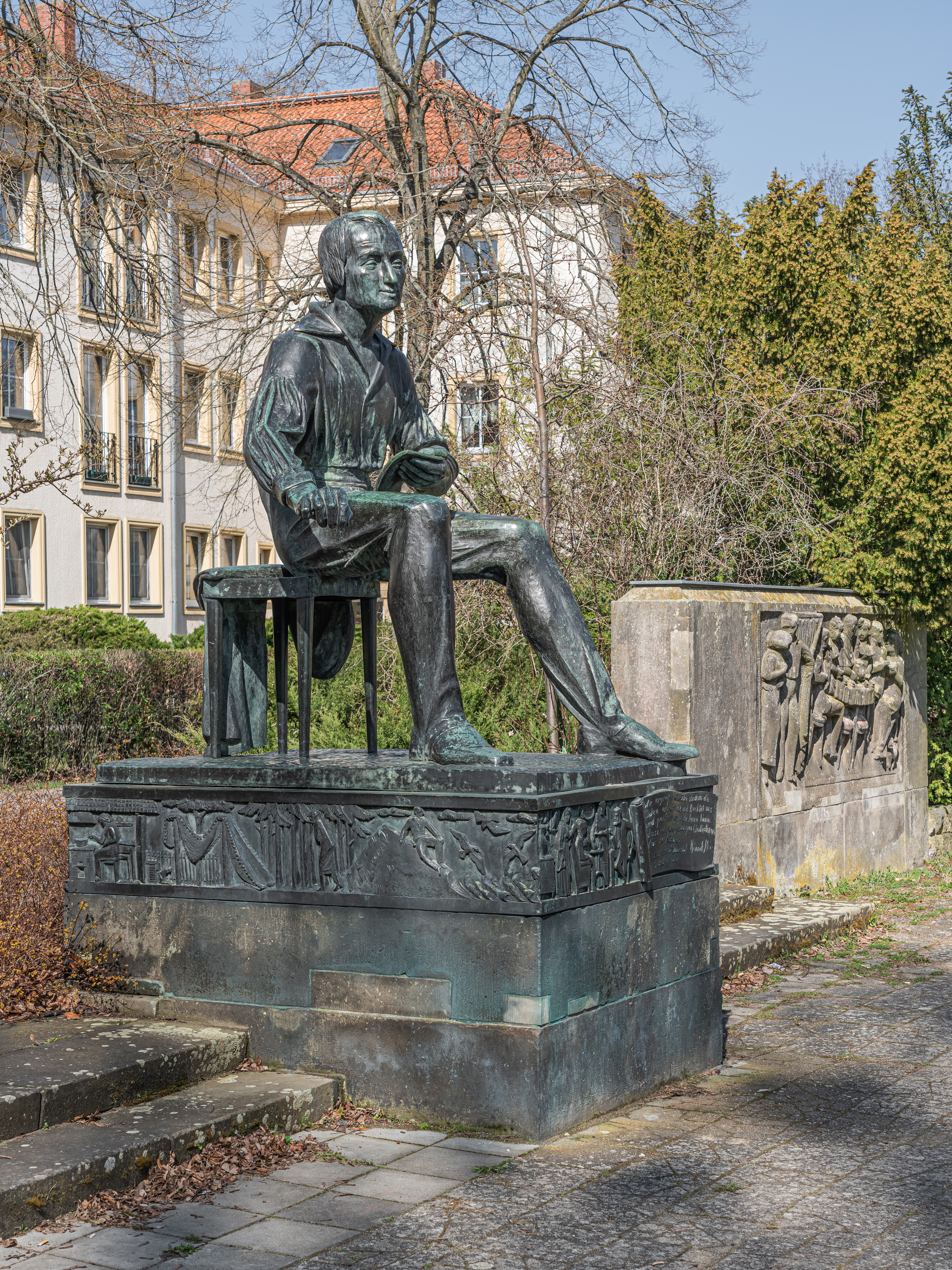
Heinrich-Heine-Monument, created by the sculptor Waldemar Grzimek, unveiled in 1956 (poets quarter/Dichterviertel)

The first settlement in the main town took place at 1750 under Frederick II of Prussia; several villages already existed in the 13th century (Gröben 1170). Ludwigsfelde has been classified as a town since 1965.

== Culture and places of interest ==
=== Sport ===
Ludwigsfelde is one of the sister towns of football club, Hertha BSC Berlin. The Ludwigsfelder Football Club played in the Brandenburgliga in 2017/2018. The Ludwigsfelder Handball Club played in the Oberliga Ostsee-Spree in 2017/18.

There are also German champions in cycle ball and model gliding.

On 7 August 2005, a marathon was run during the European Speed Skating Championships.

== Economy and infrastructure ==
In 1936 Daimler-Benz Motoren GmbH was founded with a new factory at Genshagen / Ludwigsfelde. The factory made Daimler-Benz DB 600 series aircraft engines until 1945, when the USAAF bombed the plant and then what plant had survived the bombing was removed and taken to the Soviet Union as war reparations. In 1952 the factory was refounded as the VEB Industriewerke Ludwigsfelde, which made various products including heavy machinery and Multicar small trade vehicles. For a brief period the plant made Pirna jet engines for the ill-fated Dresden 152 airliner. For more than a decade, 1954–65, it made IWL motor scooters, including the SR 59 Berlin (1956–59).

In 1965 the plant was enlarged and converted to build IFA trucks. When completed, the new production complex was the largest in the DDR. From 1965 the plant built IFA W50 five-tonne trucks, and from 1988 it made the larger L60 six-tonne trucks as well. Production collapsed after the DDR adopted the Deutsche Mark in July 1990. Daimler-Benz took a minority share in the plant in 1991 and complete ownership in 1994. In the 1990s the factory made T2 and Vario vans, and then at the end of the decade DaimlerChrysler modernised the plant to produce the Mercedes-Benz Vaneo. Since 2006 the plant has made Mercedes Sprinter vans and major components for Volkswagen Crafter vans.

In 1991, MTU Aero Engines founded the MTU Maintenance Berlin-Brandenburg in Ludwigsfelde.

A lithium-ion battery factory was announced in 2019, operational by 2021, and eventually delivering batteries equivalent to 10,000 cars per year.

== People ==
- Annemarie Wolff (born 1990), politician
- Jean-Pascal Hohm (born 1997), politician
