= Teltow-Fläming =

Coordinates: 52°5′N 13°18′E

- District
- Flag Coat of arms
- Country: Germany
- State: Brandenburg
- Capital: Luckenwalde

Government
  - District admin.: Kornelia Wehlan (Left)

Area
  - Total: 2,092.0 km^{2} (807.7 sq mi)

Population (31 December 2025)
  - Total: 177,982
  - Density: 85.077/km^{2} (220.35/sq mi)
- Time zone: UTC+01:00 (CET)
  - Summer (DST): UTC+02:00 (CEST)
- Vehicle registration: TF
- Website: teltow-flaeming.de

Teltow-Fläming (German pronunciation: [ˈtɛltoː ˈflɛːmɪŋ]) is a Kreis (district) in the southwestern part of Brandenburg, Germany. Neighboring districts are (from the east clockwise) Dahme-Spreewald, Elbe-Elster, the districts Wittenberg in Saxony-Anhalt, the district Potsdam-Mittelmark, and the Bundesland Berlin.

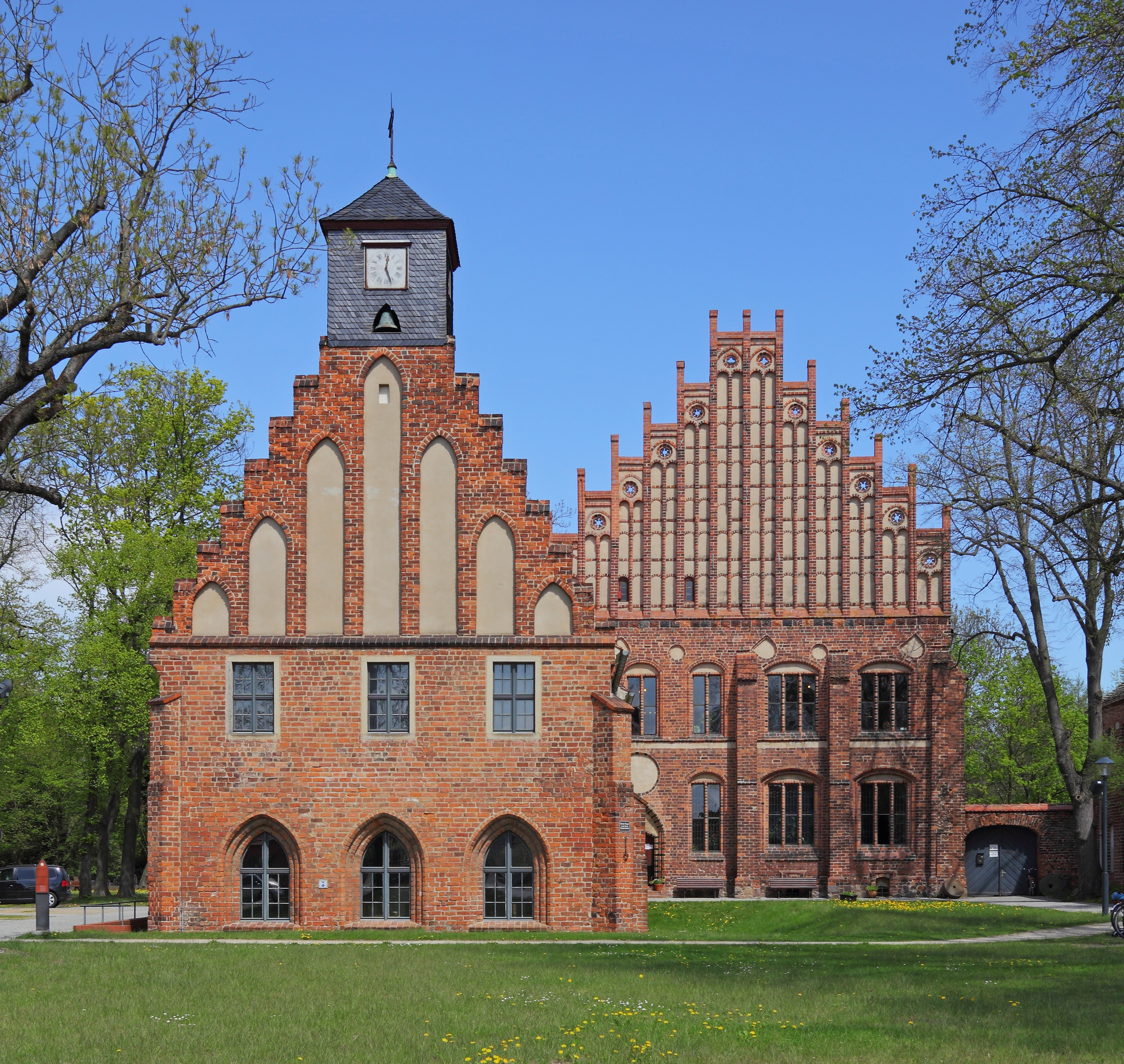
Zinna Abbey in Jüterbog, Brandenburg, Germany

== Geography ==
The district is named after the two main regions. The Teltow is an agricultural belt south of Berlin. The Fläming is a wooded hill chain in the south; the portion located in this district is called the Lower Fläming, while the Higher Fläming is situated in Potsdam-Mittelmark.

== History ==
The district was formed in December 1993 by merging the previous districts Luckenwalde, Jüterbog and Zossen, but also including small parts from other former districts such as Luckau.

== Demography ==
Development of Population since 1875 within the Current Boundaries (Blue Line: Population; Dotted Line: Comparison to Population Development of Brandenburg state. Grey Background: Time of Nazi rule; Red Background: Time of Communist rule.)

Recent Population Development and Projections (Population Development before Census 2011 (blue line); Recent Population Development according to the Census in Germany in 2011 (blue bordered line); Official projections for 2005-2030 (yellow line); for 2014-2030 (red line); for 2017-2030 (scarlet line)

Landkreis Teltow-Fläming: Population development
within the current boundaries (2025)

| Year | Pop. | ±% p.a. |
|---|---|---|
| 1875 | 86,834 | — |
| 1890 | 96,168 | +0.68% |
| 1910 | 110,132 | +0.68% |
| 1925 | 117,872 | +0.45% |
| 1933 | 125,505 | +0.79% |
| 1939 | 156,063 | +3.70% |
| 1946 | 174,751 | +1.63% |
| 1950 | 173,975 | −0.11% |
| 1964 | 158,225 | −0.68% |
| 1971 | 160,970 | +0.25% |

| Year | Pop. | ±% p.a. |
|---|---|---|
| 1981 | 154,974 | −0.38% |
| 1985 | 154,227 | −0.12% |
| 1990 | 150,136 | −0.54% |
| 1995 | 148,133 | −0.27% |
| 2000 | 159,735 | +1.52% |
| 2005 | 161,902 | +0.27% |
| 2010 | 161,386 | −0.06% |
| 2015 | 163,553 | +0.27% |
| 2020 | 171,554 | +0.96% |
| 2025 | 177,982 | +0.74% |

== Miscellaneous ==
In the time from 1997 to 2001, the district had the biggest increase in the gross economic product of all districts of Germany with a rate of +56.1%. Flaeming-Skate is a 160 km (99 mi) long route specially for inline skating, the only such route in Germany. The town of Teltow is not a part of the district Teltow-Fläming, just as the town of Dahme is not a part of the district of Dahme-Spreewald.

== Coat of arms ==
District banner of Teltow-Fläming

The coat of arms show the eagle of Brandenburg to the left, as the margraves of Brandenburg began to rule the northern and northwestern part of the district in the 13th century. To the right is a staff of an abbot. It symbolizes the clerical state of Magdeburg, to which the southern and middle part of the district belonged. The black-and-white checkered bottom derives from the coat of arms of the family of Torgow, who owned the area around Zossen until 1478.

After the creation of the new district a public contest was held to create a coat of arms for the district. Out of ten proposals the parliament of the district selected the one made by the designer Horst Nehls from Merow. The coat of arms were officially granted by ministry of interior of Brandenburg on November 21, 1996.

== Towns and municipalities ==
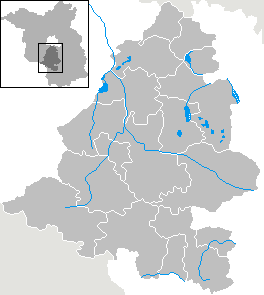
Clickable map of towns and municipalities in the district

Amt-free towns
1. Baruth/Mark
2. Jüterbog
3. Luckenwalde
4. Ludwigsfelde
5. Trebbin
6. Zossen
Amt-free municipalities
1. Am Mellensee
2. Blankenfelde-Mahlow
3. Großbeeren
4. Niedergörsdorf
5. Nuthe-Urstromtal
6. Rangsdorf
Amt

1. Dahme/Mark

1. Dahme^{1, 2}
2. Dahmetal
3. Ihlow
4. Niederer Fläming

^{1}seat of the Amt; ^{2}town
