= Nuthe-Nieplitz Nature Park =

Coordinates: 52°10′03″N 13°03′42″E

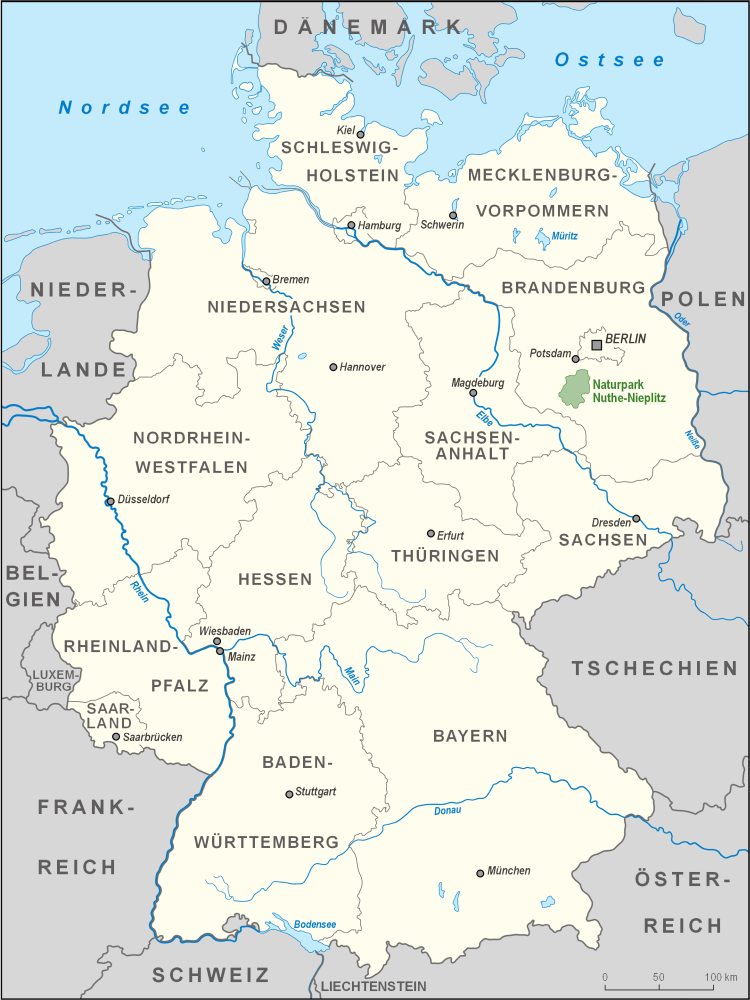

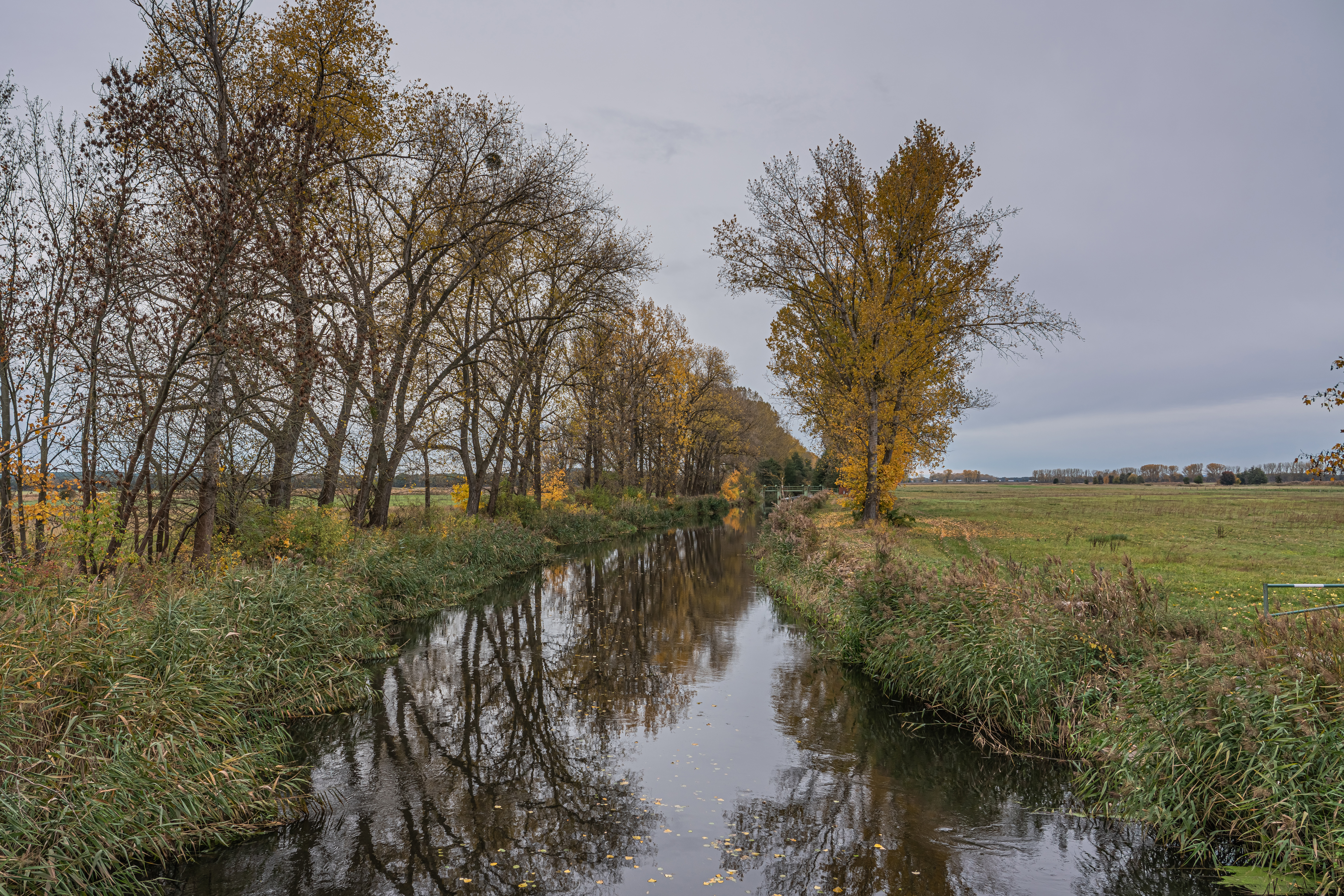

Nuthe-Nieplitz Nature Park is a nature park and reserve in the state of Brandenburg, Germany. It covers an area of 623 km^{2} (241 sq mi). It was established in August 1999 and is located south-west of Berlin. A foundation to administer the park was established in 2000.
