= Nuthe =

River in Germany

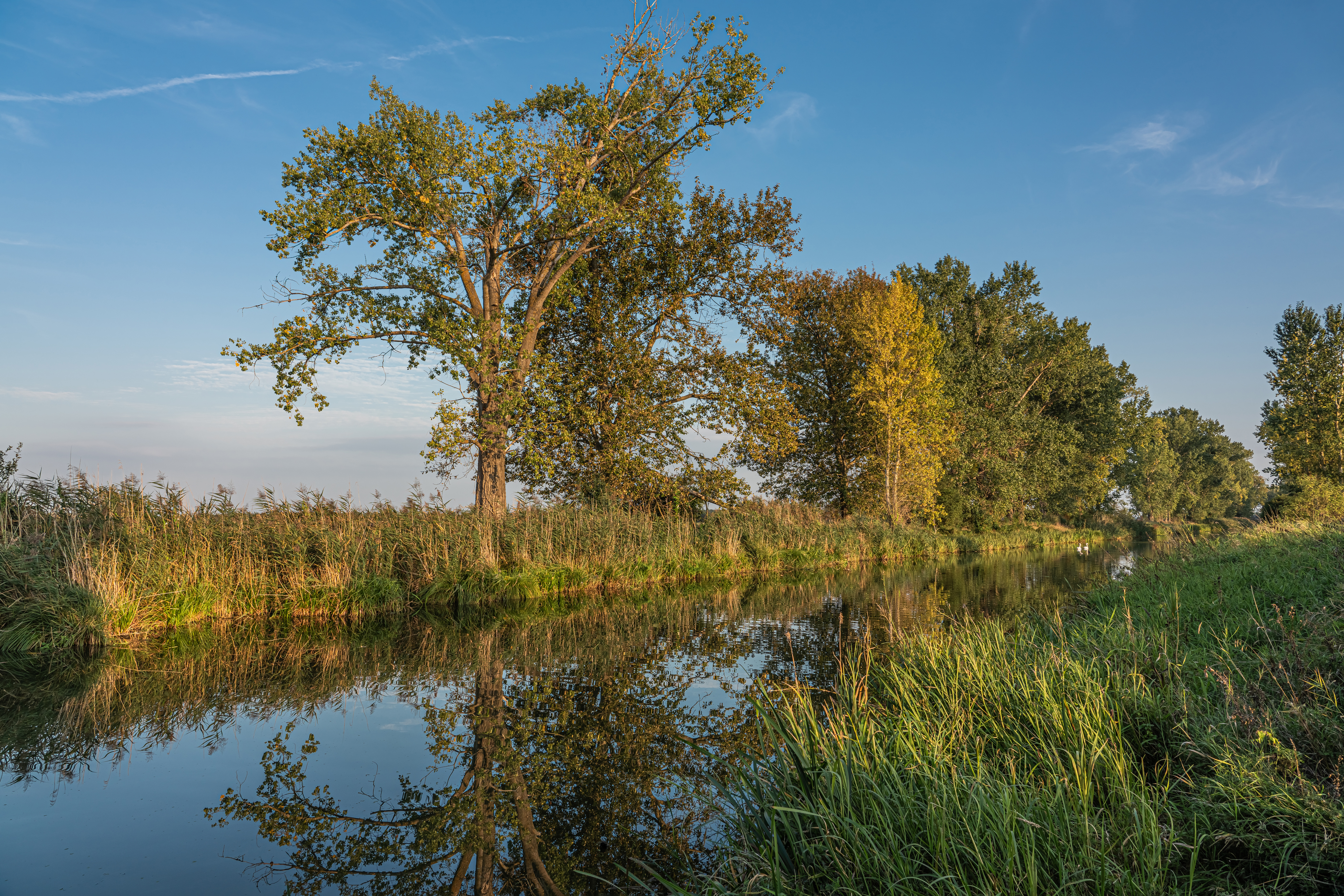

Location
- Country: Germany

Physical characteristics
- Source
  - location: Fläming
- Mouth
  - location: Havel
  - coordinates: 52°23′43″N 13°4′13″E
- Length: 65 km (40 mi)

Basin features
- Progression: Havel→ Elbe→ North Sea

The Nuthe is a river in Brandenburg, Germany, left tributary of the Havel. Its total length is 65 kilometres (40 mi). The Nuthe originates in the Fläming region, near Niedergörsdorf. It flows north through Jüterbog, Luckenwalde, Trebbin and Saarmund. The Nuthe joins the Havel in central Potsdam.
