= Dahme-Spreewald – Teltow-Fläming III =

Federal electoral district of Germany

62 Dahme-Spreewald – Teltow-Fläming III
- Electoral district for the Bundestag
- Dahme-Spreewald – Teltow-Fläming III in 2025
- State: Brandenburg
- Population: 311,400 (2019)
- Electorate: 252,744 (2021)
- Major settlements: Königs Wusterhausen; Luckenwalde
- Area: 3,887.12 km^{2}

Current electoral district
- Created: 2002
- Party: AfD
- Member: Steffen Kotré
- Elected: 2025

Dahme-Spreewald – Teltow-Fläming III is an electoral constituency (German: Wahlkreis) represented in the Bundestag. It elects one member via first-past-the-post voting. Under the current constituency numbering system, it is designated as constituency 62. It is located in central Brandenburg, comprising the Dahme-Spreewald district and most of the Teltow-Fläming district.

Dahme-Spreewald – Teltow-Fläming III was created for the 2002 federal election. From 2021 to 2025, it was represented by Sylvia Lehmann of the Social Democratic Party (SPD). Since 2025 it has been represented by Steffen Kotré of the AfD.

== Geography ==
Dahme-Spreewald – Teltow-Fläming III is located in central Brandenburg. As of the 2025 federal election, it comprises the entirety of the Dahme-Spreewald district and the entirety of the Teltow-Fläming district excluding the Jüterbog, Ludwigsfelde, and Niedergörsdorf municipalities.

== History ==
Dahme-Spreewald – Teltow-Fläming III, originally Dahme-Spreewald – Teltow-Fläming III – Oberspreewald-Lausitz I, was created in 2002 and contained parts of the abolished constituencies of Luckenwalde – Zossen – Jüterbog – Königs Wusterhausen, Bad Liebenwerda – Finsterwalde – Herzberg – Lübben – Luckau, Fürstenwalde – Strausberg – Seelow, und Frankfurt (Oder) – Eisenhüttenstadt – Beeskow. In the 2002 and 2005 elections, it was constituency 62 in the numbering system. In the 2009 election, it was number 63. Since the 2013 election, it has been number 62.

Upon the abolition of the Zossen Amt ahead of the 2005 election, the former municipality of Groß Schulzendorf was transferred out of the constituency. In the 2009 election, it gained the municipalities of Blankenfelde-Mahlow and Rangsdorf. In the 2017 election, it gained the municipality of Großbeeren. Ahead of the 2025 election, it lost the municipality of Lübbenau.

Election	No.	Name	Borders
2002	62	Dahme-Spreewald – Teltow-Fläming III – Oberspreewald-Lausitz I	Dahme-Spreewald district; Teltow-Fläming district (excluding Blankenfelde-Mahlow, Großbeeren, Jüterbog, Ludwigsfelde, Niedergörsdorf, and Rangsdorf municipalities); Oberspreewald-Lausitz district (only Lübbenau municipality)
2005	62	Dahme-Spreewald – Teltow-Fläming III – Oberspreewald-Lausitz I	Dahme-Spreewald district; Teltow-Fläming district (excluding Blankenfelde-Mahlow, Großbeeren, Jüterbog, Ludwigsfelde, Niedergörsdorf, and Rangsdorf municipalities); Oberspreewald-Lausitz district (only Lübbenau municipality)
2009	63	Dahme-Spreewald – Teltow-Fläming III – Oberspreewald-Lausitz I	Dahme-Spreewald district; Teltow-Fläming district (excluding Großbeeren, Jüterbog, Ludwigsfelde, and Niedergörsdorf municipalities); Oberspreewald-Lausitz district (only Lübbenau municipality)
2013	62	Dahme-Spreewald – Teltow-Fläming III – Oberspreewald-Lausitz I	Dahme-Spreewald district; Teltow-Fläming district (excluding Großbeeren, Jüterbog, Ludwigsfelde, and Niedergörsdorf municipalities); Oberspreewald-Lausitz district (only Lübbenau municipality)
2017	62	Dahme-Spreewald – Teltow-Fläming III – Oberspreewald-Lausitz I	Dahme-Spreewald district; Teltow-Fläming district (excluding Jüterbog, Ludwigsfelde, and Niedergörsdorf municipalities); Oberspreewald-Lausitz district (only Lübbenau municipality)
2021	62	Dahme-Spreewald – Teltow-Fläming III – Oberspreewald-Lausitz I	Dahme-Spreewald district; Teltow-Fläming district (excluding Jüterbog, Ludwigsfelde, and Niedergörsdorf municipalities); Oberspreewald-Lausitz district (only Lübbenau municipality)
2025	62	Dahme-Spreewald – Teltow-Fläming III	Dahme-Spreewald district; Teltow-Fläming district (excluding Jüterbog, Ludwigsfelde, and Niedergörsdorf municipalities)

== Members ==
The constituency was first represented by Peter Danckert of the Social Democratic Party (SPD) from 2002 to 2013. It was won by Jana Schimke of the Christian Democratic Union (CDU) in 2017. Sylvia Lehmann regained it for the SPD in 2021.

Election	Member	Party	%
2002	Peter Danckert	SPD	48.3
2005	Peter Danckert	SPD	42.8
2009	Peter Danckert	SPD	32.4
2013	Jana Schimke	CDU	37.0
2017	Jana Schimke	CDU	30.7
2021	Sylvia Lehmann	SPD	26.5
2025	Steffan Kotré	AfD	33.6

== Election results ==
=== 2025 election ===
Federal election (2025): Dahme-Spreewald – Teltow-Fläming III
Notes:	Blue background denotes the winner of the electorate vote. Pink background denotes a candidate elected from their party list. Yellow background denotes an electorate win by a list member, or other incumbent. A ✓ or ✗ denotes status of any incumbent, win or lose respectively.						
Party	Candidate	Votes	%	±%	Party votes	%	±%
AfD	Steffan Kotré	66,811	33.6	▲16.1	63,990	32.1	▲14.3
CDU	Jana Schimke	47,404	23.8	▲3.9	39,080	19.6	▲3.2
SPD	Anja Soheam	35,053	17.6	▼8.5	29,306	14.7	▼13.5
Left	Robert Kosin	22,423	11.3	▲2.2	20,401	10.2	▲2.4
BSW					20,395	10.2	New
Greens	Andrea Lübcke	10,248	5.2	▼2.1	12,433	6.2	▼2.4
FDP	Jean-Paul Kley	4,967	2.5	▼5.4	6,970	3.5	▼6.4
FW	Matthias Stefke	5,510	2.8	▼1.5	2,852	1.4	▼1.7
PARTEI	Thomas Hugnagel	3,126	1.6	New	1,902	1.0	▼0.1
Volt	Sascha Loy	2,150	1.1	New	1,414	0.7	▲0.4
Independent	John Kohle	1,078	0.5	New			
BD					467	0.2	New
MLPD					135	0.1	0.0
Informal votes		2,006			1,431		
Total valid votes		198,770			199,345		
Turnout		200,776	83.1	▲6.0			
AfD gain from SPD	Majority	19,407	9.8	N/A			

=== 2021 election ===
Federal election (2021): Dahme-Spreewald – Teltow-Fläming III – Oberspreewald-Lausitz I
Notes:	Blue background denotes the winner of the electorate vote. Pink background denotes a candidate elected from their party list. Yellow background denotes an electorate win by a list member, or other incumbent. A ✓ or ✗ denotes status of any incumbent, win or lose respectively.						
Party	Candidate	Votes	%	±%	Party votes	%	±%
SPD	Sylvia Lehmann	50,696	26.5	▲6.9	54,650	28.5	▲10.9
CDU	✗ Jana Schimke	38,080	19.9	▼10.8	31,299	16.3	▼10.7
AfD	Steffen Kotré	33,719	17.6	▼2.7	34,411	17.9	▼3.1
Left	Carsten Preuß	17,417	9.1	▼7.3	14,955	7.8	▼8.0
FDP	Lars Hartfelder	15,073	7.9	▲3.0	18,893	9.9	▲2.4
Greens	Gerhard Kalinka	13,523	7.1	▲2.7	16,156	8.4	▲3.8
FW	Uwe Tanneberger	8,065	4.2	▲1.5	5,883	3.1	▲1.6
Tierschutzpartei	Christiane Müller-Schmolt	6,735	3.5		6,073	3.2	▲1.3
dieBasis	Torsten Bartels	2,916	1.5		2,743	1.4	
PARTEI					2,080	1.1	▼0.1
Familie	Andreas Beer	1,817	0.9				
Unabhängige					991	0.5	
Pirates	Guido Körber	1,319	0.7	0.0	919	0.5	
Independent	Roald Hitzer	622	0.3				
Independent	Michael Gabler	617	0.3				
Team Todenhöfer					614	0.3	
NPD					550	0.3	▼0.5
Volt					544	0.3	
ÖDP	Ralf Nobel	442	0.2		330	0.2	0.0
DKP	Susanne Steinhardt	394	0.2	▼0.2	291	0.2	0.0
Humanists					248	0.1	
MLPD					100	0.1	0.0
Independent	Volker Commentz	78	0.0				
Informal votes		2,948			2,731		
Total valid votes		191,513			191,730		
Turnout		194,461	76.9	▲1.5			
SPD gain from CDU	Majority	12,616	6.6				

=== 2017 election ===
Federal election (2017): Dahme-Spreewald – Teltow-Fläming III – Oberspreewald-Lausitz I
Notes:	Blue background denotes the winner of the electorate vote. Pink background denotes a candidate elected from their party list. Yellow background denotes an electorate win by a list member, or other incumbent. A ✓ or ✗ denotes status of any incumbent, win or lose respectively.						
Party	Candidate	Votes	%	±%	Party votes	%	±%
CDU	✓ Jana Schimke	56,607	30.7	▼6.6	49,982	27.0	▼8.0
AfD	Dietmar Ertel	37,358	20.3		38,915	21.0	▲14.7
SPD	Sylvia Lehmann (Note: Lehmann entered the Bundestag on the SPD list after the resignation of Manja Schüle in December 2019.)	36,148	19.6	▼7.5	32,565	17.6	▼5.1
Left	Carsten Joachim Preuß	30,278	16.4	▼5.1	29,217	15.8	▼5.7
FDP	Rico Kerstan	8,910	4.8	▲3.6	13,718	7.4	▲4.6
Greens	Gerhard Kalinka	8,127	4.4	▲0.6	8,617	4.7	▲0.1
FW	Ralf Sebastian von der Bank	5,032	2.7	▲0.6	2,652	1.4	0.0
Tierschutzpartei					3,456	1.9	
PARTEI					2,239	1.2	
NPD					1,468	0.8	▼1.9
Pirates	Guido Körber	1,226	0.7	▼2.0			
DM					726	0.4	
BGE					610	0.3	
DKP	Manfred Ebel	692	0.4	▲0.2	341	0.2	
ÖDP					314	0.2	
MLPD					90	0.0	▼0.1
Informal votes		3,229			2,697		
Total valid votes		184,378			184,910		
Turnout		187,607	75.4	▲4.9			
CDU hold	Majority	19,249	10.4	▲0.6			

=== 2013 election ===
Federal election (2013): Dahme-Spreewald – Teltow-Fläming III – Oberspreewald-Lausitz I
Notes:	Blue background denotes the winner of the electorate vote. Pink background denotes a candidate elected from their party list. Yellow background denotes an electorate win by a list member, or other incumbent. A ✓ or ✗ denotes status of any incumbent, win or lose respectively.						
Party	Candidate	Votes	%	±%	Party votes	%	±%
CDU	Jana Schimke	61,487	37.0	▲12.2	57,867	34.8	▲11.1
SPD	Tina Fischer	45,078	27.2	▼5.3	37,780	22.7	▼3.2
Left	Steffen Kühne	36,284	21.9	▼4.5	36,310	21.8	▼5.3
AfD					10,605	6.4	
Greens	Andreas Rieger	6,324	3.8	▼1.7	7,425	4.5	▼1.5
NPD	Frank Knuffke	5,582	3.4	▼0.3	4,468	2.7	▼0.2
Pirates	Oliver Mücke	4,331	2.6		3,617	2.2	▼0.5
FW	Barbara Wolff	3,670	2.2		2,381	1.4	
FDP	Alice Löning	1,989	1.2	▼6.1	4,526	2.7	▼7.0
REP	Heiko Müller	924	0.6		579	0.3	▲0.1
PRO					713	0.4	
DKP					333	0.2	
MLPD					180	0.1	0.0
Informal votes		3,478			3,029		
Total valid votes		166,002			166,451		
Turnout		169,480	70.4	▲1.4			
CDU gain from SPD	Majority	16,409	9.8				

=== 2009 election ===
Federal election (2009): Dahme-Spreewald – Teltow-Fläming III – Oberspreewald-Lausitz I
Notes:	Blue background denotes the winner of the electorate vote. Pink background denotes a candidate elected from their party list. Yellow background denotes an electorate win by a list member, or other incumbent. A ✓ or ✗ denotes status of any incumbent, win or lose respectively.						
Party	Candidate	Votes	%	±%	Party votes	%	±%
SPD	✓ Peter Danckert	53,384	32.4	▼10.0	42,834	25.9	▼10.8
Left	Steffen Kühne	43,348	26.3	▲3.1	44,923	27.1	▲2.2
CDU	Tamara Zieschang	40,882	24.8	▲1.0	39,092	23.6	▲2.1
FDP	Jan Mühlmann-Skupien	11,959	7.3	▲3.1	16,102	9.7	▲2.6
Greens	Benjamin Raschke	9,041	5.5	▲2.5	9,912	6.0	▲1.0
NPD	Stella Hähnel	5,992	3.6	▲0.5	4,711	2.8	▼0.2
Pirates					4,357	2.6	
FWD					1,352	0.8	
DVU					1,255	0.8	
BüSo					397	0.2	
REP					368	0.2	
MLPD					162	0.1	▼0.1
Informal votes		5,598			4,739		
Total valid votes		164,606			165,465		
Turnout		170,204	69.0	▼7.5			
SPD hold	Majority	10,036	6.1	▼12.5			

=== 2005 election ===
Federal election (2005):Dahme-Spreewald - Teltow-Fläming III - Oberspreewald-Lausitz I
Notes:	Blue background denotes the winner of the electorate vote. Pink background denotes a candidate elected from their party list. Yellow background denotes an electorate win by a list member, or other incumbent. A ✓ or ✗ denotes status of any incumbent, win or lose respectively.						
Party	Candidate	Votes	%	±%	Party votes	%	±%
SPD	✓ Peter Danckert	68,287	42.8	▼5.5	59,146	36.9	▼9.4
Left	Michael Reimann	37,719	23.6	▲4.0	40,947	25.6	▲8.6
CDU	Carl-Heinz Klinkmüller	37,339	23.5	▼0.3	34,157	21.3	▼1.3
FDP	Kristof von Platen	6,542	4.1	▼1.4	10,783	6.7	▲0.8
NPD	Lutz Reichel	5,179	3.2		4,995	3.1	▲1.7
Greens	Werner Brömme	4,581	2.9	▼0.1	7,392	4.6	▲0.3
GRAUEN					1,380	0.9	▲0.3
50Plus The Generation-Alliance					989	0.6	
MLPD					318	0.2	
Informal votes		3,367			2,907		
Total valid votes		159,647			160,107		
Turnout		163,014	75.9	▲0.5			
SPD hold	Majority	60,568	19.2				
