= NST BS 650 =

German aircraft engine

BS 650
- Type: Aircraft engine
- National origin: Germany
- Manufacturer: NST-Machinenbau

The NST BS 650 is a German aircraft engine that was designed and produced by NST-Machinenbau of Niedergörsdorf for use in ultralight aircraft.

By March 2018 the engine was no longer advertised on the company website and seems to be out of production.

== Design and development ==
The BS 650 is a twin-cylinder four-stroke, Vee configuration, 630 cc (38.4 cu in) displacement, air-cooled, petrol engine design, with a poly V belt reduction drive with a reduction ratio of 2.7:1. It employs dual magnetos and produces 35 hp (26 kW) at 4200 rpm, with a compression ratio of 9.0:1.

== Specifications (BS 650) ==
Data from Tacke

=== General characteristics ===
- Type: V-twin cylinder, four stroke aircraft engine
- Bore: 76 mm (3.0 in)
- Stroke: 70 mm (2.8 in)
- Displacement: 630 cc (38.4 cu in)
- Length: 400 mm (15.7 in)
- Width: 3,600 mm (141.7 in)
- Height: 280 mm (11.0 in)
- Dry weight: 33 kg (72.8 lb)

=== Components ===
- Fuel type: petrol
- Cooling system: air
- Reduction gear: poly V belt

=== Performance ===
- Power output: 35 hp (26 kW)

== See also ==
Related lists

- List of aircraft engines
