= Andrea Lübcke =

German politician (born 1978)

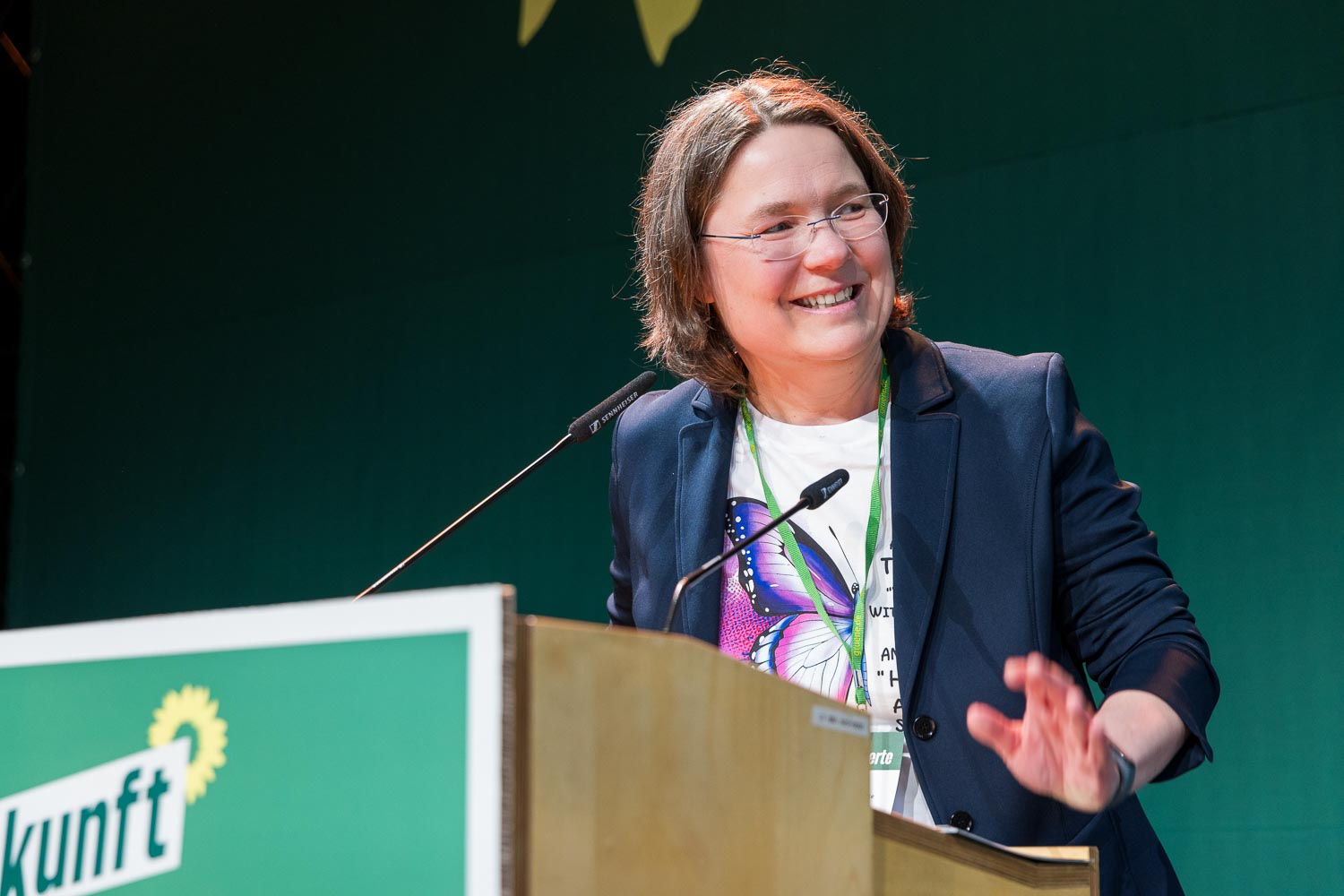
- Andrea Lübcke in 2025

Member of the Bundestag
- Incumbent
- Assumed office 1 July 2025
- Preceded by: Annalena Baerbock
- Constituency: Brandenburg

Personal details
- Born: 9 December 1978 (age 47) Grevesmühlen (then Bezirk Rostock, East Germany
- Party: Alliance 90/The Greens
- Education: University of Jena

Andrea Lübcke (born 9 December 1978) is a German politician for Alliance 90/The Greens. She has been the state chairwoman of Alliance 90/The Greens Brandenburg since March 2025 and a member of the German Bundestag since July 2025.

== Life ==
Lübcke grew up in the small Mecklenburg town of Brüel. She lives with her family in Eichwalde and has two sons.

=== Scientific career ===
After graduating from high school in Brüel in 1997, Andrea Lübcke studied physics at the Friedrich Schiller University of Jena. After a six-month research internship at the Lawrence Livermore National Laboratory in California, USA, she graduated in 2002 with a diploma thesis on "Utilizing the Borrmann effect to develop an ultrafast switch in the X-ray range." From 2002 onward, she worked as a doctoral student at the Institute of Optics and Quantum Electronics at the Friedrich Schiller University of Jena. In 2007, she received her doctorate with a thesis on time-resolved X-ray diffraction on high-temperature superconductors.

From 2007 to 2019, Lübcke worked as a scientist at various research institutions in Germany and Switzerland, including the Free University of Berlin, the Max Born Institute, the Swiss Federal Institute of Technology in Lausanne, and the Paul Scherrer Institute. From 2019 to 2021, she was a lecturer in optics and photonics at the Institute of Optics and Atomic Physics at the Technical University of Berlin.

In 2021, she moved to scientific policy consulting at the German Academy of Science and Engineering (Acatech). Until 2025, she was responsible for leading projects on the development of the hydrogen economy and innovation ecosystems for fusion technologies.

=== Political career ===
Lübcke became a member of Alliance 90/The Greens in 2018. Since 2019, she has been a member of the Eichwalde municipal council and the Dahme-Spreewald district council. She has been chairwoman of the Green Party faction in the municipal council since 2019, and in the district council since 2023.

From 2020 to 2023, she was an advisory board member of the Dahme-Spreewald district association of Alliance 90/The Greens. On 15 March 2025, Lübcke was elected co-state chairwoman of the Greens in Brandenburg.

In the 2024 Brandenburg state election, Lübcke ran as a direct candidate for Alliance 90/The Greens in the Dahme-Spreewald I constituency and was ranked 19th on the state list. However, the Greens were unable to win a direct mandate statewide and failed to clear the five percent hurdle to re-enter the Landtag of Brandenburg.

In the 2025 German federal election, Lübcke ran as a direct candidate in the constituency of Dahme-Spreewald – Teltow-Fläming III and in third place on the state list of the Greens in Brandenburg. In her constituency, she came fifth with 5.2 percent of the first votes after the candidates of the AfD, CDU, SPD and The Left, and was thus unsuccessful. Since only the first two places from her party's state list were successful, she initially failed to enter the German Bundestag. After Annalena Baerbock resigned from her mandate to take up the role of President of the United Nations General Assembly, Lübcke took her place in the German Bundestag on 1 July 2025. In the Bundestag, Lübcke is the chairwoman of her parliamentary group in the Committee on Research, Technology, Space and Technology Assessment.

Upon her election to the Bundestag, Lübcke announced that she would resign from her position as state chairwoman in autumn 2025.

== See also ==
- List of members of the 20th Bundestag
