= Sylvia Lehmann =

German politician (born 1954)

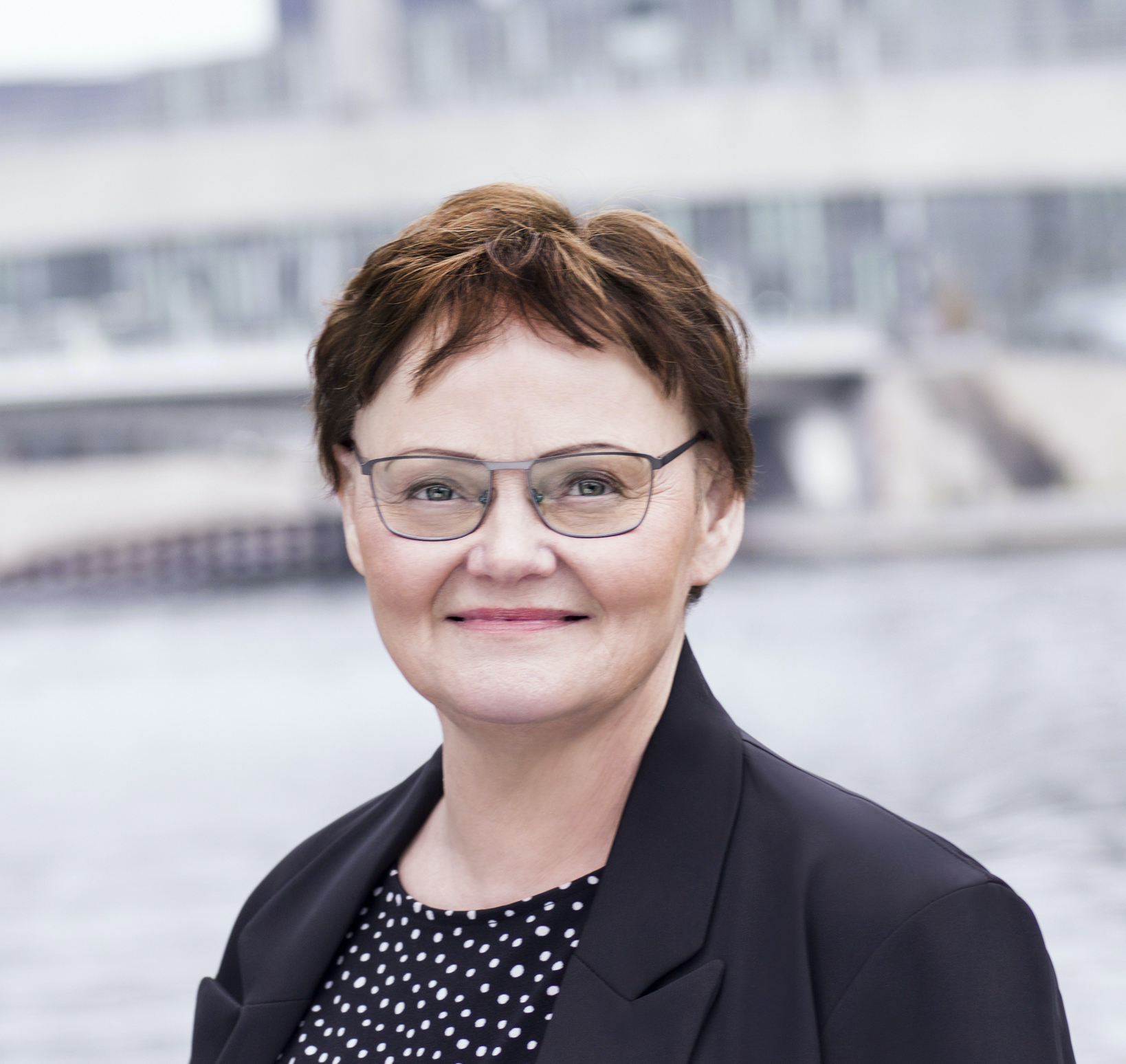
- Lehmann in 2019

Member of the Bundestag
- In office 3 December 2019 – 25 March 2025
- Preceded by: Manja Schüle
- Succeeded by: Steffen Kotré
- Constituency: Potsdam – Potsdam-Mittelmark II – Teltow-Fläming II (2019–2021); Dahme-Spreewald – Teltow-Fläming III – Oberspreewald-Lausitz I (2021–2025)

Member of the Landtag of Brandenburg
- In office 13 October 2004 – 25 September 2019
- Preceded by: Multi-member district
- Succeeded by: Hans-Christoph Berndt
- Constituency: State list (2004–2009); Dahme-Spreewald III (2009–2019)

Personal details
- Born: 23 April 1954 (age 72) Drebkau, East Germany
- Party: Social Democratic
- Children: 2

Sylvia Lehmann (born 23 April 1954) is a German politician of the Social Democratic Party (SPD) who served as a member of the Bundestag from the state of Brandenburg from 2019 to 2025.

== Political career ==
Between 2004 and 2019 Lehmann was a member of the State Parliament of Brandenburg.

Lehmann became a member of the German Bundestag on 3 December 2019 replacing Manja Schüle, representing the Dahme-Spreewald – Teltow-Fläming III – Oberspreewald-Lausitz I constituency. In that capacity, she serves on the Committee on Food and Agriculture.

In 2024 she announced that she would not seek re-election in the Bundestag.

== Other activities ==
- Federal Foundation for the Reappraisal of the SED Dictatorship, Alternate Member of the Board of Trustees
