= Zellendorf station =

Railway station in Niedergörsdorf, Germany

Zellendorf
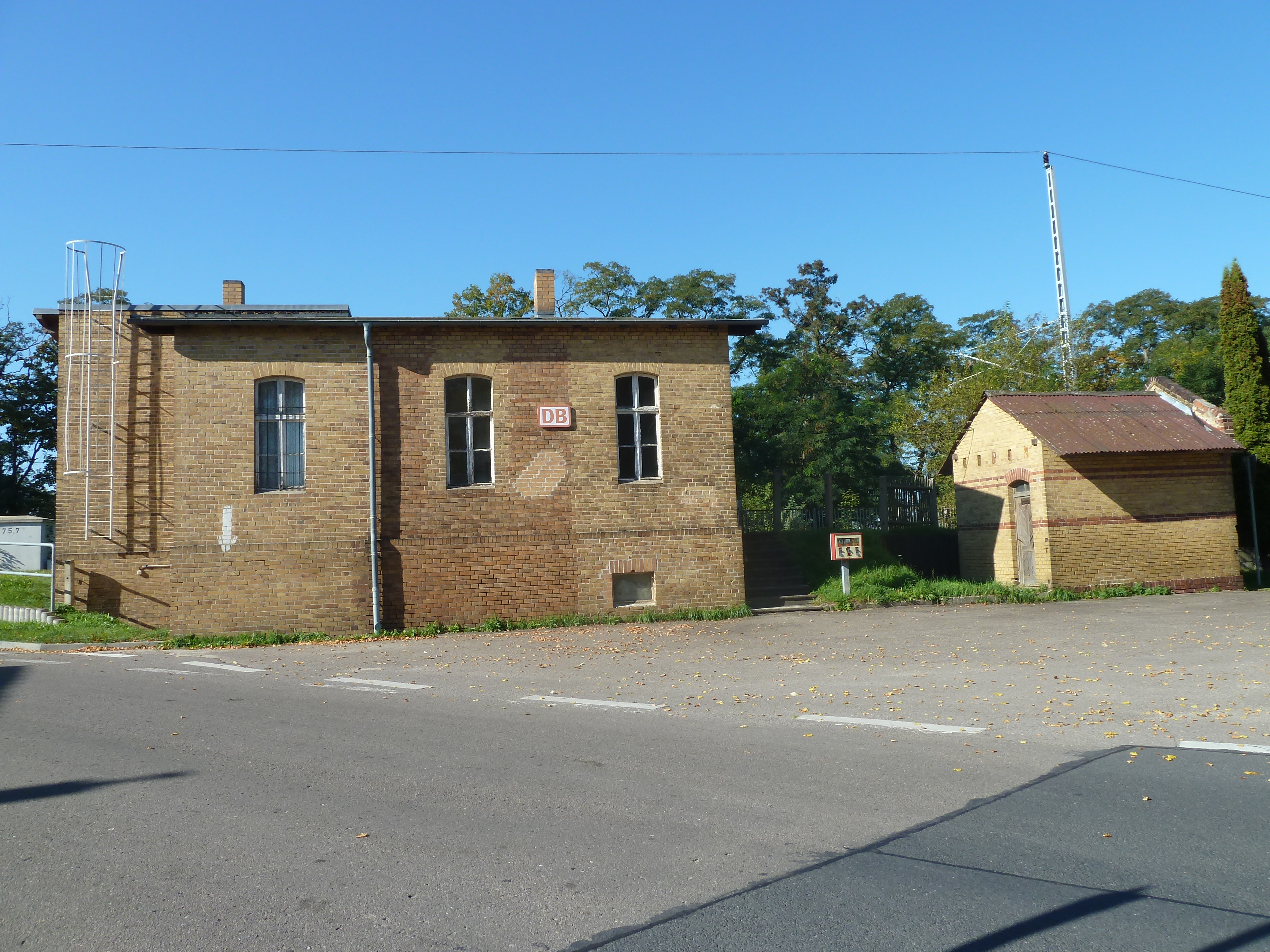
- 2011

General information
- Location: Zellendorf; 14913 Niedergörsdorf; Brandenburg; Germany
- Coordinates: 51.8941°N 13.0666°E
- Elevation: 89 m (292 ft)
- System: Hp
- Owner: DB Netz
- Operator: DB Station&Service
- Lines: Jüterbog–Röderau railway (KBS 204)
- Platforms: 1 side platform
- Tracks: 1
- Train operators: DB Regio Nordost

Construction
- Accessible: Yes

Other information
- Station code: 6994
- DS100 code: LZD
- IBNR: 8013384
- Category: 7
- Fare zone: : 6950
- Website: www.bahnhof.de

Services
Preceding station	DB Regio Nordost	Following station
Oehna towards Rathenow	RE 4	Linda (Elster) towards Falkenberg (Elster)
Location
- Location within Brandenburg Location within Germany Location within Europe

Zellendorf station is a railway station in the municipality of Zellendorf, located in the Teltow-Fläming district in Brandenburg, Germany.

== History ==
The stop (line-kilometre 75.2), which was closed in 1995, was put back into operation in a different location (line-kilometre 75.8) in December 2013.
