= Barnim III (electoral district) =

State electoral district of Germany

15: Barnim III
- Electoral district for the Landtag of Brandenburg
- Barnim III in 2024
- District: Barnim
- Electorate: 59,014 (2024)
- Major settlements: Werneuchen

Current electoral district
- Created: 1994
- Party: AfD
- Member: Lena Kotré

Barnim III is an electoral constituency (German: Wahlkreis) represented in the Landtag of Brandenburg. It elects one member via first-past-the-post voting. Under the constituency numbering system, it is designated as constituency 15. It is located in the Barnim district.

== Geography ==
The constituency includes the town of Werneuchen, as well as the communities of Ahrensfelde and Wandlitz, and the administrative divisions of Biesenthal-Barnim and Britz-Chorin-Oderberg.

There were 59,014 eligible voters in 2024.

== Members ==
Election	Member	Party	%
2004	Ralf Christoffers	PDS	36.0
2009	Michael Luthardt	Left	31.4
2014	Britta Müller	SPD	27.3
2019	Steffen John	AfD	23.9
2024	Lena Kotré	AfD	34.9

== Election results ==
=== 2024 election ===
State election (2024): Barnim III
Notes:	Blue background denotes the winner of the electorate vote. Pink background denotes a candidate elected from their party list. Yellow background denotes an electorate win by a list member, or other incumbent. A ✓ or ✗ denotes status of any incumbent, win or lose respectively.						
Party	Candidate	Votes	%	±%	Party votes	%	±%
AfD	Lena Kotré	15,540	34.9	▲11.0	14,015	31.3	▲6.9
SPD	Klingsporn	12,194	27.4	▲3.8	11,859	26.5	▲2.8
BSW					7,011	15.7	
CDU	Mauersberger	7,300	16.4	▼0.7	5,169	11.6	▼3.2
BVB/FW	Dr. Buder	5,401	12.1	▲2.9	2,008	4.5	▼4.0
Left	Czok-Alm	2,507	5.6	▼6.5	1,320	2.9	▼8.8
Greens	Gellert	1,172	2.6	▼6.7	1,624	3.6	▼6.5
Tierschutzpartei					776	1.7	▼0.8
Plus					345	0.8	▼0.1
FDP	Höhr	385	0.9	▼1.9	296	0.7	▼2.4
DLW					184	0.4	
Values					74	0.2	
Third Way					37	0.1	
DKP					30	0.1	
Informal votes		565			316		
Total valid votes		44,499			44,748		
Turnout		45,064	76.4	▲13.4			
AfD hold	Majority	3,346	7.5				

=== 2019 election ===
State election (2019): Barnim III
Notes:	Blue background denotes the winner of the electorate vote. Pink background denotes a candidate elected from their party list. Yellow background denotes an electorate win by a list member, or other incumbent. A ✓ or ✗ denotes status of any incumbent, win or lose respectively.						
Party	Candidate	Votes	%	±%	Party votes	%	±%
AfD	Jan-Steffen John	8,521	23.9	▲12.8	8,709	24.4	▲12.3
SPD	✗ Britta Müller	8,387	23.6	▼3.7	8,445	23.7	▼4.6
CDU	Carsten Bruch	6,073	17.1	▼6.9	5,277	14.8	▼7.4
Left	Isabelle Czok-Alm	4,312	12.1	▼1.2.6	4,177	11.7	▼10.9
Greens	Dr. Michael Egidius Luthardt	3,330	9.4	▲4.6	3,599	10.1	▲4.4
BVB/FW	Detlef Klix	3,294	9.3	▲4.2	3,035	8.5	▲4.9
FDP	Stephan Fischer	977	2.7	▲1.3	1,094	3.1	▲1.7
Tierschutzpartei					908	2.5	
Die PARTEI	Mirko Schlauß	688	1.9				
Pirates					188	0.5	▼0.9
ÖDP					138	0.4	
V-Partei3					84	0.2	
Informal votes		676			604		
Total valid votes		35,582			35,654		
Turnout		36,258	62.9	▲16.0			
AfD gain from SPD	Majority	134	0.3				

=== 2014 election ===
State election (2014): Barnim III
Notes:	Blue background denotes the winner of the electorate vote. Pink background denotes a candidate elected from their party list. Yellow background denotes an electorate win by a list member, or other incumbent. A ✓ or ✗ denotes status of any incumbent, win or lose respectively.						
Party	Candidate	Votes	%	±%	Party votes	%	±%
SPD	Britta Müller	7,020	27.3	▼1.2	7,280	28.3	▼0.3
Left	✗ Dr. Michael Luthardt	6,353	24.7	▼6.7	5,813	22.6	▼7.5
CDU	Uwe Liebehenschel	6,170	24.0	▲3.4	5,705	22.2	▲2.9
AfD	Bernd Bednarski	2,841	11.1		3,116	12.1	
BVB/FW	Jürgen Hintze	1,308	5.1	▲1.5	915	3.6	▲1.1
Greens	Thomas Dyhr	1,244	4.8	▼0.3	1,459	5.7	Steady
NPD					595	2.3	▼0.9
Pirates	Jürgen Voigt	396	1.5		354	1.4	
FDP	Andreas Baumann	352	1.4	▼5.6	352	1.4	▼6.3
DKP					79	0.3	▲0.1
REP					70	0.3	Steady
Informal votes		414			360		
Total valid votes		25,684			25,738		
Turnout		26,098	46.9	▼22.6			
SPD gain from Left	Majority	667	2.6				

=== 2009 election ===
State election (2009): Barnim III
Notes:	Blue background denotes the winner of the electorate vote. Pink background denotes a candidate elected from their party list. Yellow background denotes an electorate win by a list member, or other incumbent. A ✓ or ✗ denotes status of any incumbent, win or lose respectively.						
Party	Candidate	Votes	%	±%	Party votes	%	±%
Left	Michael Luthardt	11,847	31.4	▼4.6	11,398	30.1	▼2.5
SPD	Reinhold Dellmann	10,788	28.6	▲1.6	10,877	28.7	▲0.4
CDU	Mathias Dumke	7,781	20.6	▼0.8	7,336	19.3	▲0.4
FDP	Heiner Loos	2,629	7.0	▲3.5	2,896	7.6	▲4.5
Greens	Axel Vogel	1,937	5.1	▲1.2	2,137	5.6	▲2.2
NPD	Mike Sandow	1,459	3.9		1,231	3.2	
BVB/FW	Frank-Uwe Unger	1,341	3.5		949	2.5	
DVU					432	1.1	▼4.7
50Plus					219	0.6	Steady
RRP					177	0.5	
REP					115	0.3	
DKP					84	0.2	Steady
Die-Volksinitiative					73	0.2	
Informal votes		1,007			865		
Total valid votes		37,782			37,924		
Turnout		38,789	69.4	▲12.8			
Left hold	Majority	1,059	2.8	▼6.2			

=== 2004 election ===
State election (2004): Barnim III
Notes:	Blue background denotes the winner of the electorate vote. Pink background denotes a candidate elected from their party list. Yellow background denotes an electorate win by a list member, or other incumbent. A ✓ or ✗ denotes status of any incumbent, win or lose respectively.						
Party	Candidate	Votes	%	±%	Party votes	%	±%
PDS	Ralf Christoffers	10,508	36.01		9,586	32.63	
SPD	Reinhold Dellmann	7,869	26.97		8,326	28.34	
CDU	Martin Horst	6,233	21.36		5,566	18.95	
DVU					1,703	5.80	
Greens	Elke Rosch	1,143	3.92		1,009	3.43	
Familie					755	2.57	
AfW (Free Voters)	Günther Spangenberg	1,104	3.78		295	1.00	
BRB	Thomas Strese	1,034	3.54		408	1.39	
FDP	Gero Riedel	1,010	3.46		906	3.08	
Gray Panthers					296	1.01	
Independent	Harald Ulrich	280	0.96				
50Plus					190	0.65	
AUB-Brandenburg					121	0.41	
Yes Brandenburg					92	0.31	
DKP					73	0.25	
Schill					53	0.18	
Informal votes		785			587		
Total valid votes		29,181			29,379		
Turnout		29,966	56.64				
PDS win new seat	Majority	2,639	9.04				

== See also ==
- Politics of Brandenburg
- Landtag of Brandenburg
