= Lena Kotré =

German politician (born 1987)

- Kotré in 2025

Member of the Landtag of Brandenburg
- Incumbent
- Assumed office 25 September 2019
- Constituency: Barnim III (2024–present)

Personal details
- Born: 11 November 1987 (age 38)
- Party: Alternative for Germany (since 2015)
- Other political affiliations: German Freedom Party (2011–2015)
- Spouse: Steffen Kotré (m. 2021)

Lena Kotré (née Duggen; born 11 November 1987) is a German politician (AfD) serving as a member of the Landtag of Brandenburg since 2019. She has been married to Steffen Kotré since 2021.
