= Benjamin Raschke =

German politician (born 1982)

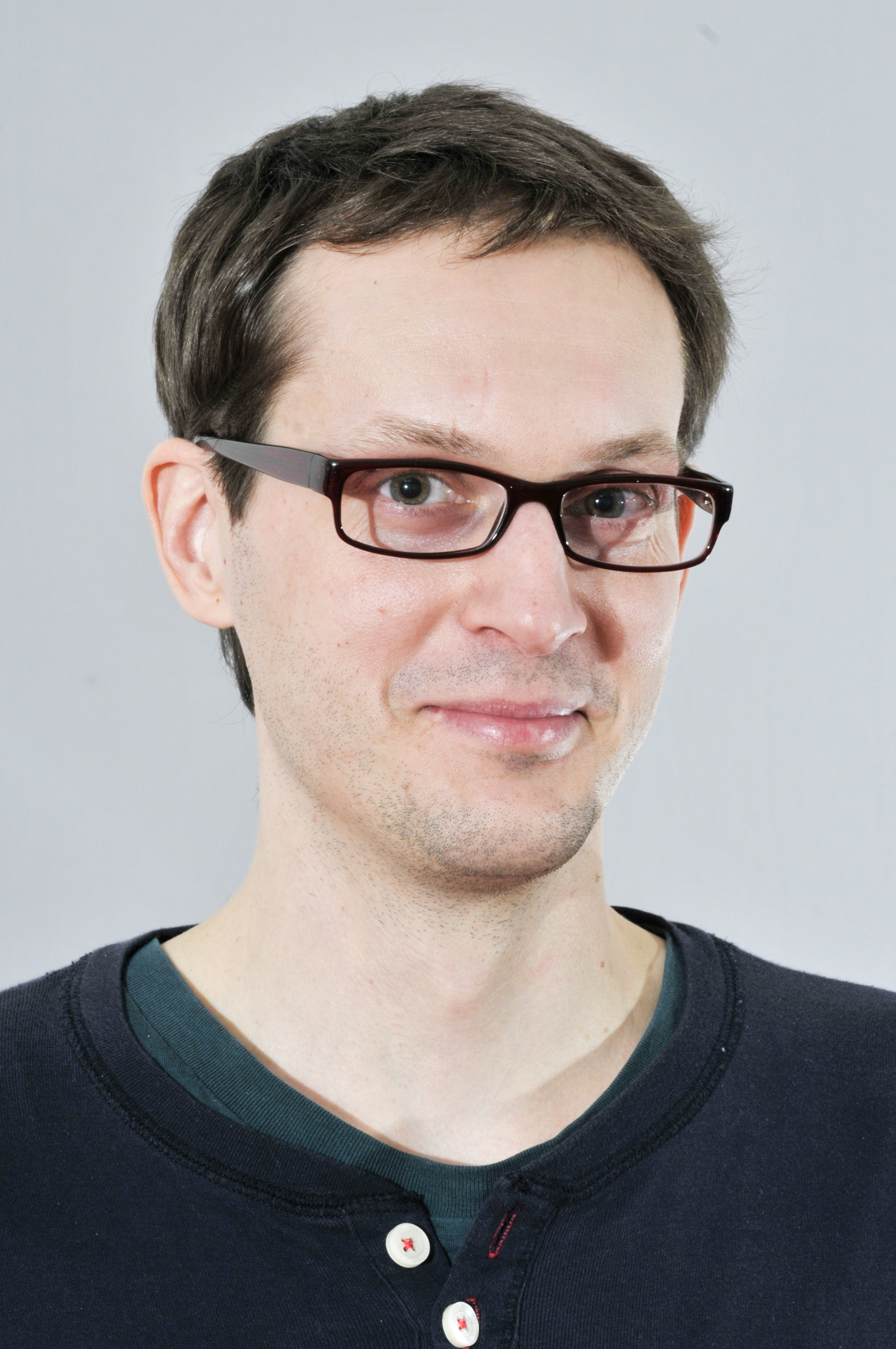
Raschke in 2016

Benjamin Raschke (born 23 December 1982 in Lübben (Spreewald)) is a German politician of Bündnis 90/Die Grünen Brandenburg who was a member of the Landtag of Brandenburg from 2014 to 2024. He became the parliamentary group leader in December 2019.

== Career ==
Raschke attended the Paul Gerhardt Gymnasium in Lübben and passed his Abitur exams there in 2002.

From 2002 to 2007 he studied political science, philosophy and law at the University of Konstanz and the University of Warsaw, graduating with a master's degree in political science. From 2007 to 2008 he was a climate campaigner for the Federal Association of the Alliance 90/The Greens. Until 2010 he worked as a mobility consultant for the Federal Association of Consumer Organizations (Verbraucherzentrale).

== Political career ==
Raschke has been a member of Alliance 90/The Greens since 2005. In 2006/2007 he was a member of the board of the Konstanz district association . From September 2008 to December 2019 Benjamin Raschke was a community representative in Schönwald (Dahme-Spreewald district). In the 2009 German federal election he stood as a candidate in the Dahme-Spreewald – Teltow-Fläming III and was number 2 on the Brandenburg state list of the Greens.

On 14 November 2009 Benjamin Raschke was elected alongside Annalena Baerbock as one of two equal state chairmen of the Alliance 90/The Greens' Brandenburg state association. He was confirmed in this position in 2011 and 2013 and gave up the position of state chairman when he became a member of the State Parliament in 2014.

From 2010 to 2012, Benjamin Raschke was a research assistant for the Alliance 90/The Greens parliamentary group in the Bundestag, working for the environmental policy spokeswoman Dorothea Steiner and the deputy parliamentary group leader Bärbel Höhn.

In the 2014 Brandenburg state election, he stood as a candidate in Landtagswahlkreis Dahme-Spreewald I and on state list position 4, from which he entered the state parliament. His main areas of work are the environment, agriculture, animal welfare, rural areas and legal policy.

In the 2019 Brandenburg state election, Raschke was the Green Party 's top candidate together with Ursula Nonnemacher. He also ran in Landtagswahlkreis Dahme-Spreewald III. He was elected to the state parliament via the state list. Since December 2019, Raschke has been parliamentary group leader and animal welfare and justice policy spokesman for the Alliance 90/The Greens parliamentary group in the Brandenburg state parliament.

In the 2024 Brandenburg state election, Raschke was the Green Party's top candidate together with Antje Töpfer. They led the party to defeat, suffering an electoral wipeout, losing all their seats.

== Personal life ==
Raschke is the father of two children.

== Bibliography ==
- Positionen und Machtverhältnisse in der deutschen Verbraucherpolitik, Master's thesis at the University of Konstanz, Konstanz 2006.
- Trägt das Verbraucherverhalten zum Klimaschutz bei? Study commissioned by the Green parliamentary group, June 2011.
