= Antje Töpfer =

German politician (born 1968)

Antje Töpfer (born 22 May 1968 in Ludwigsfelde, East Germany) is a German politician from Alliance 90/The Greens. From December 2022 to September 2024 she was State Secretary in the Ministry of Social Affairs, Health, Integration and Consumer Protection of the State of Brandenburg.

== Career ==
Töpfer graduated from high school in 1986. From 1986 to 1990 she studied to become a qualified teacher of chemistry and biology at the Pädagogischen Hochschule Potsdam. From 1990 to 1994 she studied food chemistry at Technische Universität Berlin. She completed her studies with part A of the state examination. From 1994 to 1995 she completed scientific internships at the Institute of Food Chemistry at the TU Berlin. From 1996 to 1998 she completed a postgraduate course in food chemistry at the TU Berlin. She graduated with a diploma . From 1995 to 1999 she worked as a research assistant at the Institute of Food Chemistry at the TU Berlin. She received her doctorate there in 1999. From 1998 to 2001 and in 2009 she worked as a freelance research assistant at Dorel Verlags GmbH & CoKG. From 2001 to 2006 she worked as a research assistant at the Federal Institute for Materials Research and Testing. From 2006 to 2007 she worked at the German Institute for Standardization. From 2010 to 2015 she worked as a research assistant in the office of the Senate of the Federal Research Institutes in the business area of the Federal Ministry of Food and Agriculture. From 2015 until her appointment as State Secretary in 2022 she was a consultant in the Federal Ministry of Food and Agriculture.

On 5 December 2022, Töpfer was appointed State Secretary in the Ministry of Social Affairs, Health, Integration and Consumer Protection of the State of Brandenburg, succeeding Anna Heyer-Stuffer.

Töpfer is a member of the Havelland district council and chairwoman of the local Green Party group.

In the 2024 Brandenburg state election, Töpfer was the Green Party's top candidate together with Benjamin Raschke. They led the party to defeat, suffering an electoral wipeout, losing all their seats.

== Personal life ==
She lives in a civil partnership and has two children.
