= Dahme-Spreewald I =

State electoral district of Germany

26: Dahme-Spreewald I
- Electoral district for the Landtag of Brandenburg
- Dahme-Spreewald I in 2024
- District: Dahme-Spreewald
- Electorate: 60,016 (2024)
- Major settlements: Mittenwalde and Wildau

Current electoral district
- Created: 1994
- Party: SPD
- Member: Tina Fischer

Dahme-Spreewald I is an electoral constituency (German: Wahlkreis) represented in the Landtag of Brandenburg. It elects one member via first-past-the-post voting. Under the constituency numbering system, it is designated as constituency 26. It is located in within the district of Dahme-Spreewald.

== Geography ==
The constituency includes the towns of Mittenwalde and Wildau, as well as the communities of Bestensee, Eichwalde, Schönefeld, Schulzendorf, and Zeuthen.

There were 60,016 eligible voters in 2024.

== Members ==
Election	Member	Party	%
2004	Tina Fischer	SPD	29.6
2009	Tina Fischer	SPD	33.3
2014	Tina Fischer	SPD	30.1
2019	Tina Fischer	SPD	28.8
2024	Tina Fischer	SPD	36.5

== Election results ==
=== 2024 election ===
State election (2024): Dahme-Spreewald I
Notes:	Blue background denotes the winner of the electorate vote. Pink background denotes a candidate elected from their party list. Yellow background denotes an electorate win by a list member, or other incumbent. A ✓ or ✗ denotes status of any incumbent, win or lose respectively.						
Party	Candidate	Votes	%	±%	Party votes	%	±%
SPD	✓ Tina Fischer	15,630	36.5	▲7.7	14,088	32.7	▲7.0
AfD	Jan Schenk	12,286	28.7	▲7.6	11.365	26.4	▲4.9
CDU	Lakenmacher	7,365	17.2	▲0.3	5,811	13.5	▼1.9
BSW					5,341	12.4	
BVB/FW	Knuth	3,180	7.4	▼0.7	1,133	2.6	▼3.0
Left	Mollenschott	1,868	4.4	▼5.9	1,159	2.7	▼7.5
Greens	Andrea Lübcke	1,434	3.3	▼7.8	1,896	4.4	▼8.6
APT					1,102	2.6	▼0.4
FDP	Wagner	528	1.2	▼2.2	430	1.0	▼3.1
Independent	Schamberger	357	0.8				
Plus					381	0.9	▼0.4
DLW					146	0.3	
Values					129	0.3	
Third Way					51	0.1	
DKP	Gerstenberger	226	0.5	▲0.2	51	0.1	
Informal votes		523			314		
Total valid votes		42,874			43,083		
Turnout		43,397	72.3	▲9.1			
SPD hold	Majority	3,344	7.8	▲0.1			

=== 2019 election ===
State election (2019): Dahme-Spreewald I
Notes:	Blue background denotes the winner of the electorate vote. Pink background denotes a candidate elected from their party list. Yellow background denotes an electorate win by a list member, or other incumbent. A ✓ or ✗ denotes status of any incumbent, win or lose respectively.						
Party	Candidate	Votes	%	±%	Party votes	%	±%
SPD	✓ Tina Fischer	10,064	28.8	▼1.3	9,000	25.7	▼0.9
AfD	Dennis Hohloch	7,380	21.1	▲10.6	7,512	21.4	▲8.1
CDU	Björn Lakenmacher	5,907	16.9	▼7.5	5,374	15.3	▼7.3
Greens	Sabine Freund	3,893	11.1	▲4.6	4,558	13.0	▲5.0
Left	Claudia Mollenschott	3,590	10.3	▼9.1	3,577	10.2	▼8.7
BVB/FW	Annette Lehmann	2,875	8.2	▲3.0	1,958	5.6	▲0.8
FDP	Felix Schäfer	1,192	3.4	▲2.4	1,437	4.1	▲3.0
Tierschutzpartei					1,047	3.0	
Pirates					254	0.7	▼1.2
ÖDP					206	0.6	
German Communist Party	Thomas Münzberg	119	0.3				
V-Partei3					102	0.3	
Informal votes		477			454		
Total valid votes		35,002			35,025		
Turnout		35,479	63.2	▼12.5			
SPD hold	Majority	2,684	7.7	▲2.0			

=== 2014 election ===
State election (2014): Dahme-Spreewald I
Notes:	Blue background denotes the winner of the electorate vote. Pink background denotes a candidate elected from their party list. Yellow background denotes an electorate win by a list member, or other incumbent. A ✓ or ✗ denotes status of any incumbent, win or lose respectively.						
Party	Candidate	Votes	%	±%	Party votes	%	±%
SPD	✓ Tina Fischer	8,055	30.1	▼3.2	7,134	26.6	▼5.6
CDU	Björn Lakenmacher	6,520	24.4	▲2.6	6,052	22.6	▲1.8
Left	Robert Seelig	5,198	19.4	▼7.6	5,051	18.9	▼6.7
AfD	Steffen Kotré	2,808	10.5		3,555	13.3	
Greens	Benjamin Raschke	1,747	6.5	▼0.4	2,135	8.0	▲1.0
BVB/FW	Lutz Rehfeldt	1,380	5.2	▲3.1	1,285	4.8	▲3.0
NPD	Frank Knuffke	767	2.9	▼0.5	615	2.3	▼0.8
Pirates					502	1.9	
FDP	Georg Binder	272	1.0	▼4.4	308	1.1	▼6.4
DKP					93	0.3	▲0.2
REP					62	0.2	Steady
Informal votes		433			388		
Total valid votes		26,747			26,792		
Turnout		27,180	50.7	▼21.5			
SPD hold	Majority	1,535	5.7	▼5.8			

=== 2009 election ===
State election (2009): Dahme-Spreewald I
Notes:	Blue background denotes the winner of the electorate vote. Pink background denotes a candidate elected from their party list. Yellow background denotes an electorate win by a list member, or other incumbent. A ✓ or ✗ denotes status of any incumbent, win or lose respectively.						
Party	Candidate	Votes	%	±%	Party votes	%	±%
SPD	✓ Tina Fischer	12,320	33.3	▲3.7	11,927	32.2	▲1.6
Left	Herbert Burmeister	9,987	27.0	▼1.9	9,478	25.6	▼0.5
CDU	Björn Lakenmacher	8,068	21.8	▼0.7	7,715	20.8	▲0.3
Greens	Wolf Carius	2,553	6.9	▲0.7	2,604	7.0	▲2.0
FDP	Georg Binder	2,011	5.4	▲0.4	2,776	7.5	▲4.4
NPD	Frank Knuffke	1,240	3.4		1,159	3.1	
BVB/FW	Horst Schulz	778	2.1		683	1.8	
RRP					197	0.5	
50Plus					159	0.4	▼0.1
DVU					130	0.4	▼3.6
REP					91	0.2	
Die-Volksinitiative					83	0.2	
DKP					50	0.1	▼0.1
Informal votes		1,014			919		
Total valid votes		36,957			37,052		
Turnout		37,971	72.2	▲12.9			
SPD hold	Majority	2,333	6.3	▲5.6			

=== 2004 election ===
State election (2004): Dahme-Spreewald I
Notes:	Blue background denotes the winner of the electorate vote. Pink background denotes a candidate elected from their party list. Yellow background denotes an electorate win by a list member, or other incumbent. A ✓ or ✗ denotes status of any incumbent, win or lose respectively.						
Party	Candidate	Votes	%	±%	Party votes	%	±%
SPD	Tina Fischer	8,239	29.60		8,608	30.59	
PDS	Werner Koch	8,053	28.93		7,357	26.14	
CDU	Joachim Kolberg	6,267	22.51		5,761	20.47	
Greens	Werner Brömme	1,737	6.24		1,421	5.05	
DVU					1,141	4.05	
AUB-Brandenburg					962	3.42	
AfW (Free Voters)	Lutz Krause	1,659	5.96		546	1.94	
FDP	Rodolphe Kretzulesco Ottomar	1,387	4.98		879	3.12	
Familie					539	1.92	
Gray Panthers					365	1.30	
Schill	René Riwoldt	497	1.79		163	0.58	
50Plus					149	0.53	
BRB					99	0.35	
Yes Brandenburg					88	0.31	
DKP					65	0.23	
Informal votes		896			592		
Total valid votes		27,839			28,143		
Turnout		28,735	59.31				
SPD win new seat	Majority	186	0.67				

== See also ==
- Politics of Brandenburg
- Landtag of Brandenburg
