= Peter Danckert =

German politician (1940–2022)

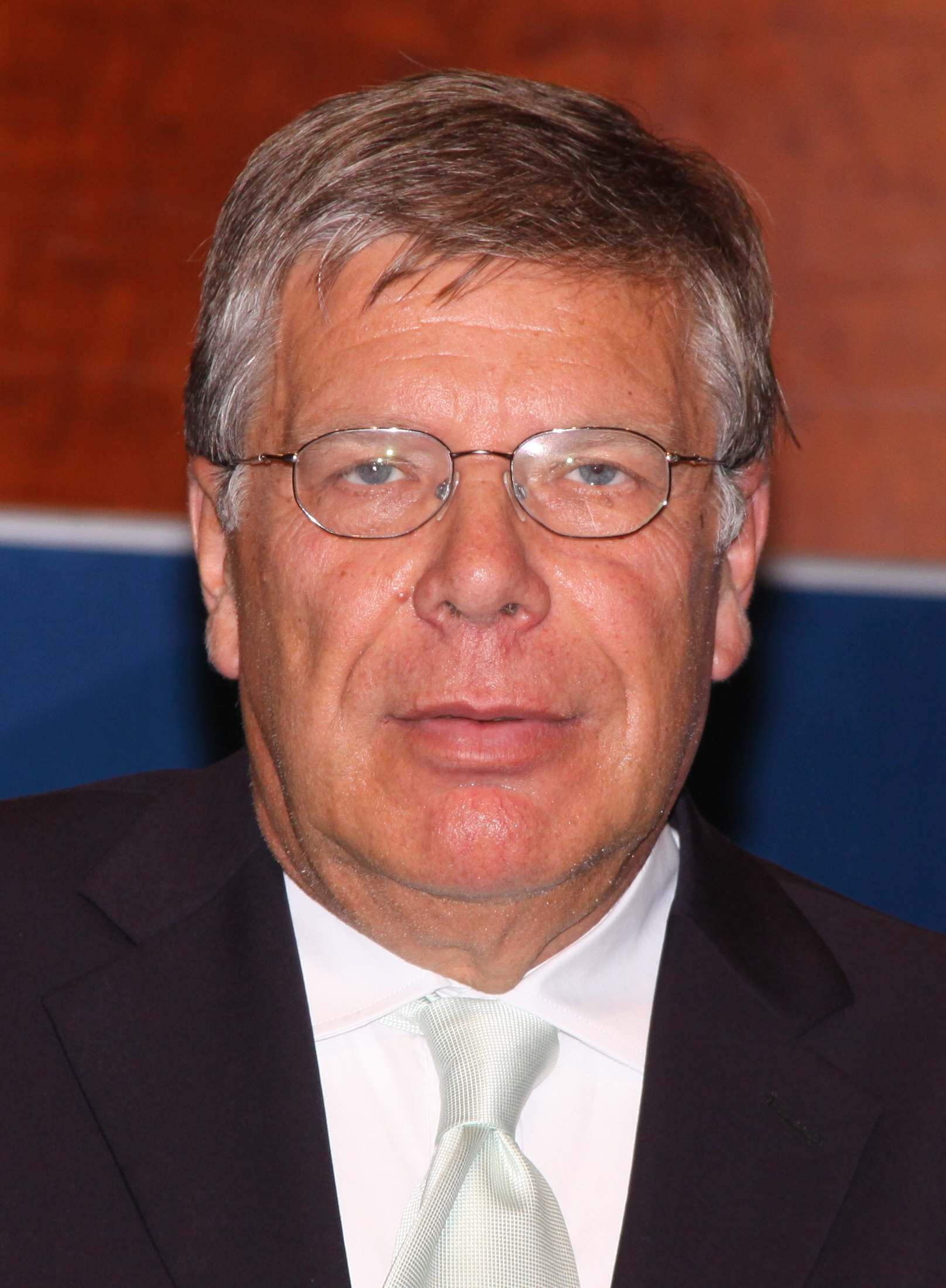
- Danckert in 2009

Member of the Bundestag
- In office 26 October 1998 – 22 October 2013
- Preceded by: Herbert Meißner
- Succeeded by: Jana Schimke
- Constituency: Luckenwalde – Zossen – Jüterbog – Königs Wusterhausen (1998–2002); Dahme-Spreewald – Teltow-Fläming III – Oberspreewald-Lausitz I (2002–2013)

Personal details
- Born: 8 July 1940 Berlin, Germany
- Died: 3 November 2022 (aged 82) Berlin, Germany
- Party: Social Democratic
- Children: 4
- Education: Free University of Berlin; LMU Munich; University of Cologne

Peter Wilhelm Danckert (8 July 1940 – 3 November 2022) was a German politician and member of the SPD. He was born in Berlin, Brandenburg, Prussia, Germany, and was a member of the Bundestag from 1998 to 2013.
