= Jana Schimke =

German politician

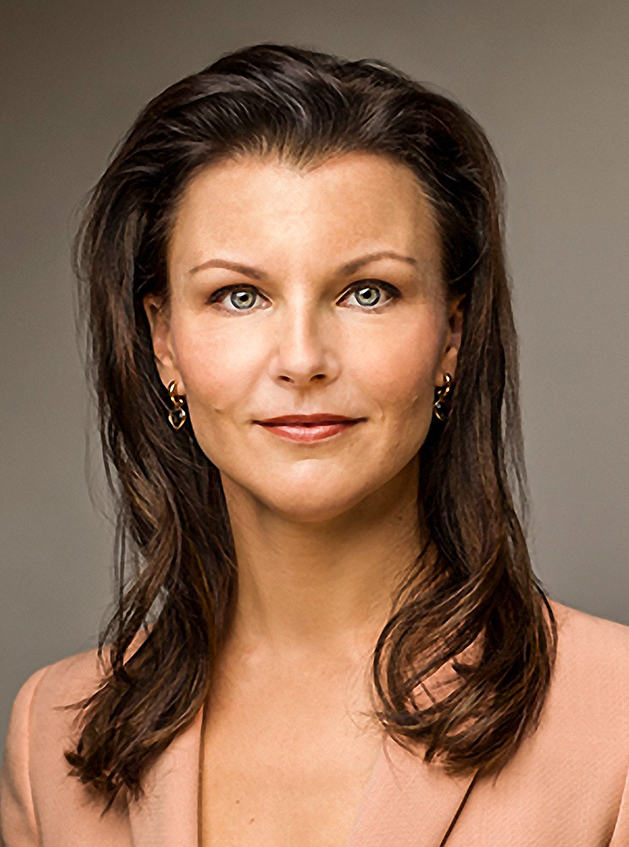
- Schimke in 2017

Member of the Bundestag; from Brandenburg
- In office 22 October 2013 – 25 March 2025
- Preceded by: Peter Danckert
- Succeeded by: Multi-member district
- Constituency: Dahme-Spreewald – Teltow-Fläming III – Oberspreewald-Lausitz I (2013–2021); State list (2021–2025)

Personal details
- Born: 6 September 1979 (age 47) Cottbus, East Germany
- Party: Christian Democratic Union
- Children: 2
- Education: TU Dresden; Free University of Berlin

Jana Schimke (born 6 September 1979) is a German politician of the Christian Democratic Union (CDU) who served as a member of the Bundestag from 2013 to 2025.

== Early life and career ==
Schimke was born in Cottbus, Germany. A political scientist, she worked as an intern in the Bundestag from 2002 to 2006. She also worked for the Confederation of German Employers' Associations (BDA) from 2008 until 2013.

== Political career ==
At the general election in September 2013, Schimke unexpectedly gained the constituency of Dahme-Spreewald – Teltow-Fläming III – Oberspreewald-Lausitz I from the Social Democratic Party. From 2013 to 2021, she served on the Committee on Labor and Social Affairs, where she was her parliamentary group's rapporteur on temporary employment and the situation in the East German states. In addition to her committee assignments, she was the chairwoman of the German-Spanish Parliamentary Friendship Group. Within the CDU/CSU, she was a member of MIT, its pro-business wing.

Since 2015, Schimke has been serving as deputy chairwoman of the CDU in Brandenburg, under the leadership of chairman Ingo Senftleben. In 2019, she was appointed by the Federal Ministry of the Interior, Building and Community to serve on the committee that oversaw the preparations for the 30th anniversary of German reunification.

From 2021 to 2025, Schimke served as chairwoman of the Committee on Tourism.

== Life after politics ==
After leaving parliament, Schimke was appointed as managing director of the German Hotel and Restaurant Association (DEHOGA) in 2025.

== Other activities ==
=== Regulatory agencies ===
- Federal Network Agency for Electricity, Gas, Telecommunications, Post and Railway (BNetzA), Alternate Member of the Advisory Board

=== Corporate boards ===
- Michels Kliniken, Member of the Advisory Board

=== Non-profit organizations ===
- German Red Cross (DRK), Brandenburg Chapter, Member of the Presidium
- McDonald's Kinderhilfe Stiftung, Member of the Board of Trustees

== Political positions ==
Schimke was one of only five CDU parliamentarians who voted against the government's draft law on introducing a national minimum wage for the first time in Germany's history in July 2014.

Ahead of the Christian Democrats' leadership election in 2018, Schimke publicly endorsed Friedrich Merz to succeed Angela Merkel as the party's chair.

In 2020, Schimke opposed plans to introduce a mandatory quota aimed at achieving equal representation of women within the CDU's regional and national governing bodies by 2025.

== Recognition ==
Following her election, Schimke was named "Miss Bundestag" in poll conducted by BILD newspaper in 2013.

== Personal life ==
At the time of her election, Schimke was living with her partner in Nuthetal.
