= Tina Fischer (politician) =

German politician (born 1971)

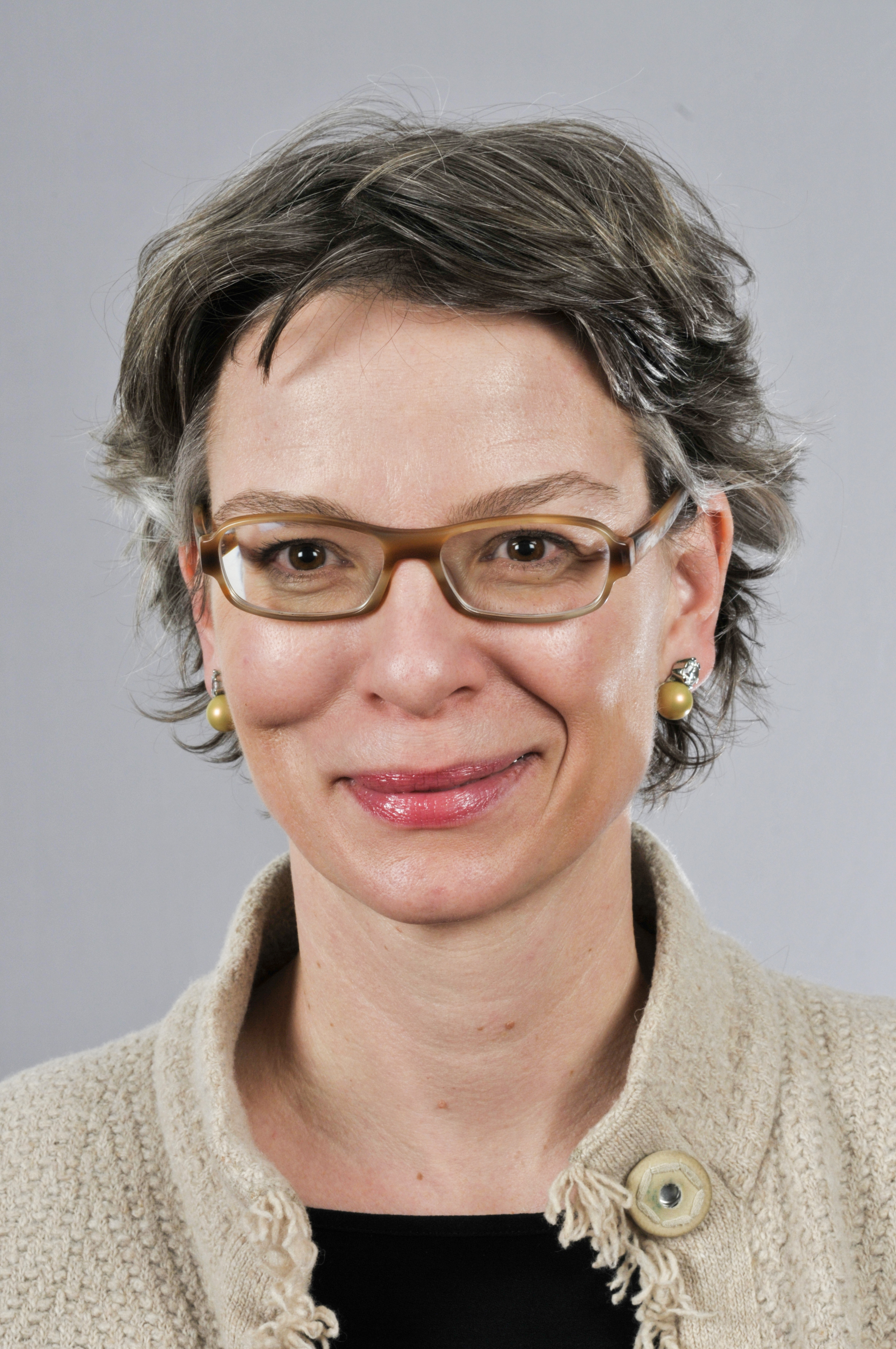
- Fischer in 2016

Member of the Landtag of Brandenburg
- Incumbent
- Assumed office 8 October 2014
- Constituency: Dahme-Spreewald I
- In office 13 October 2004 – 9 November 2009
- Preceded by: Manfred Sternagel
- Succeeded by: Kerstin Kircheis
- Constituency: Dahme-Spreewald I

Personal details
- Born: 20 August 1971 (age 54) Munich, West Germany
- Party: Social Democratic Party (since 2001)

Tina Fischer (born 20 August 1971) is a German politician. She has been a member of the Landtag of Brandenburg since 2014, having previously served from 2004 to 2009. From 2009 to 2014, she served as representative of the state government of Brandenburg to the federal government.
