= Steffen Kotré =

German politician

Steffen Kotré MdB
- Kotré in 2020

Member of the Bundestag; from Brandenburg
- Incumbent
- Assumed office 24 October 2017
- Constituency: State list (2017–2025); Dahme-Spreewald – Teltow-Fläming III (2025–present)

Personal details
- Born: 29 April 1974 (age 52) East Berlin, East Germany
- Party: Alternative for Germany
- Spouse: Lena Duggen (m. 2021)
- Children: 2

Steffen Kotré (born 29 April 1974 in East Berlin, East Germany) is a German politician for the Alternative for Germany (AfD) and since 2017 member of the Bundestag.

== Early life ==
Kotre was born 1974 in East Berlin and studied engineering management. He is member of the fraternity Corps Berlin.

== Political career ==
In 2013, Kotre entered the newly founded Alternative for Germany (AfD) and after the 2017 German federal election became a member of the Bundestag representing Brandenburg.

As of 2019, Kotre opposed the scientific consensus on climate change.

In February 2023, Kotré appeared in a Russian TV show by Vladimir Solovyov. He stated that German mainstream media were doing all they could to turn Germans against Russia and criticised German weapon deliveries to Ukraine. According to an AfD spokesman Kotré’s participation in the TV show was "not known" to the party.
