= Annalena Baerbock =

German politician and diplomat (born 1980)

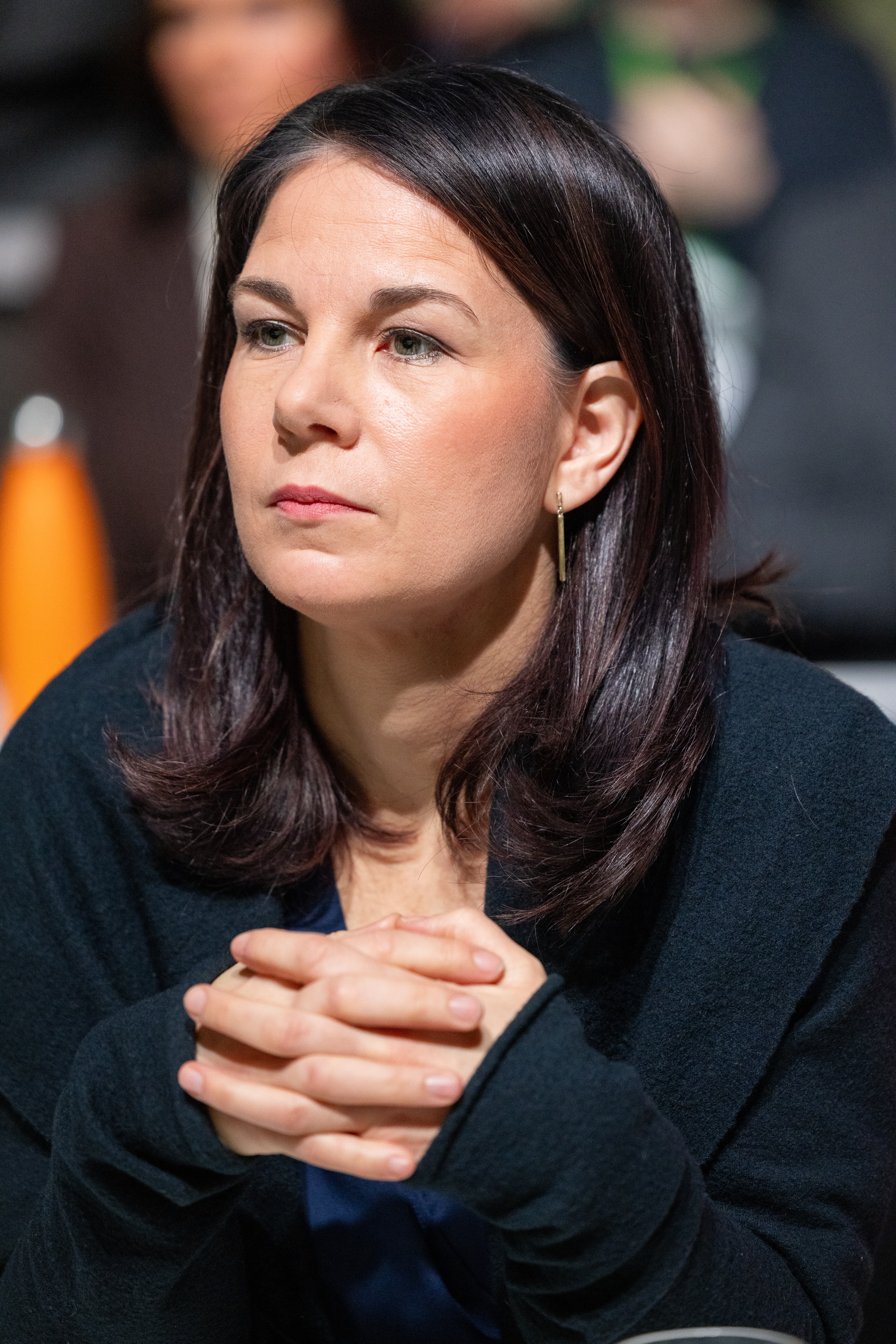
- Baerbock in 2025

80th President of the United Nations General Assembly
- In office 9 September 2025 – 8 September 2026
- Preceded by: Philémon Yang
- Succeeded by: Khalilur Rahman

Minister for Foreign Affairs
- In office 8 December 2021 – 6 May 2025
- Chancellor: Olaf Scholz
- Preceded by: Heiko Maas
- Succeeded by: Johann Wadephul

Leader of Alliance 90/The Greens
- In office 27 January 2018 – 29 January 2022 Serving with Robert Habeck
- Deputy: Gesine Agena; Ricarda Lang; Jamila Schäfer
- Preceded by: Simone Peter
- Succeeded by: Ricarda Lang

Leader of Alliance 90/The Greens in Brandenburg
- In office 14 November 2009 – 16 November 2013 Serving with Benjamin Raschke
- Preceded by: Ska Keller
- Succeeded by: Petra Budke

Member of the Bundestag for Brandenburg
- In office 22 October 2013 – 30 June 2025
- Constituency: Alliance 90/The Greens List

Personal details
- Born: Annalena Charlotte Alma Baerbock; 15 December 1980 (age 45) Hanover, West Germany
- Party: The Greens (since 2005)
- Spouse: Daniel Holefleisch (m. 2007; sep. 2024)
- Children: 2
- Education: University of Hamburg; London School of Economics (LLM)
- Occupation: Politician; journalist; diplomat
- Website: annalena-baerbock.de

Annalena Charlotte Alma Baerbock (German: [anaˈleːna ˈbɛːɐ̯bɔk]; born 15 December 1980) is a German diplomat and politician of the Alliance 90/The Greens party. She served as Germany's Minister for Foreign Affairs from 2021 to 2025 and was President of the United Nations General Assembly during its 80th session from September 2025 to September 2026.

From 2018 to January 2022, Baerbock served as co-leader of Alliance 90/The Greens, alongside Robert Habeck. She was the party's candidate for chancellor in the 2021 federal election. Olaf Scholz from SPD secured the chancellery instead of Baerbock. After the election, the Greens formed a traffic light coalition led by Olaf Scholz, and Baerbock was sworn in as Germany's first female foreign minister on 8 December 2021.

Born in Hanover, West Germany, in 1980, Baerbock attended the University of Hamburg and the London School of Economics and Political Science. She was first elected to the Bundestag in 2013. From 2012 to 2015, she was a member of the party council of Alliance 90/The Greens and from 2009 to 2013, the leader of her party's group in the state of Brandenburg.

== Early life and education ==
Baerbock is the daughter of a social worker and a mechanical engineer who worked for the US-based WABCO Vehicle Control Systems. Her family lived in Nuremberg for several years during her early childhood years, then moved to Schulenburg, which is part of Pattensen, near Hanover in Lower Saxony. There she grew up in an old reconstructed farmhouse with her two sisters and two cousins. As a child, she joined her parents at anti-war and anti-nuclear power protests organized or supported by the Green Party. She attended the Humboldt School in Hanover and at the age of 16 spent an exchange year in the United States at Lake Highland Preparatory School in Orlando, Florida.

As a teenager, Baerbock was a competitive trampoline gymnast, taking part in German championships and winning bronze three times.

From 2000 to 2004, Baerbock studied political science at the University of Hamburg, where she qualified for a pre-diploma (Diploma preliminary examination).

From 2000 to 2003, Baerbock also worked as a journalist for the Hannoversche Allgemeine Zeitung. She completed internships at Norddeutscher Rundfunk, Deutsche Presseagentur and the Council of Europe.

In 2005, Baerbock completed a one-year master's course in public international law at the London School of Economics (LSE). During her time at LSE, she stayed at Carr-Saunders Hall in Fitzrovia. In 2005, she was a trainee at the British Institute of International and Comparative Law (BIICL). She also started a dissertation on natural disasters and humanitarian aid at the Free University of Berlin, but did not finish it.

== Early career ==
After her studies, Baerbock worked from 2005 to 2008 in the office of MEP Elisabeth Schroedter. In 2008 and 2009, she worked as an adviser on foreign and security policies for the parliamentary group of the Alliance 90/The Greens in the Bundestag.

== Political career ==
=== Beginnings ===
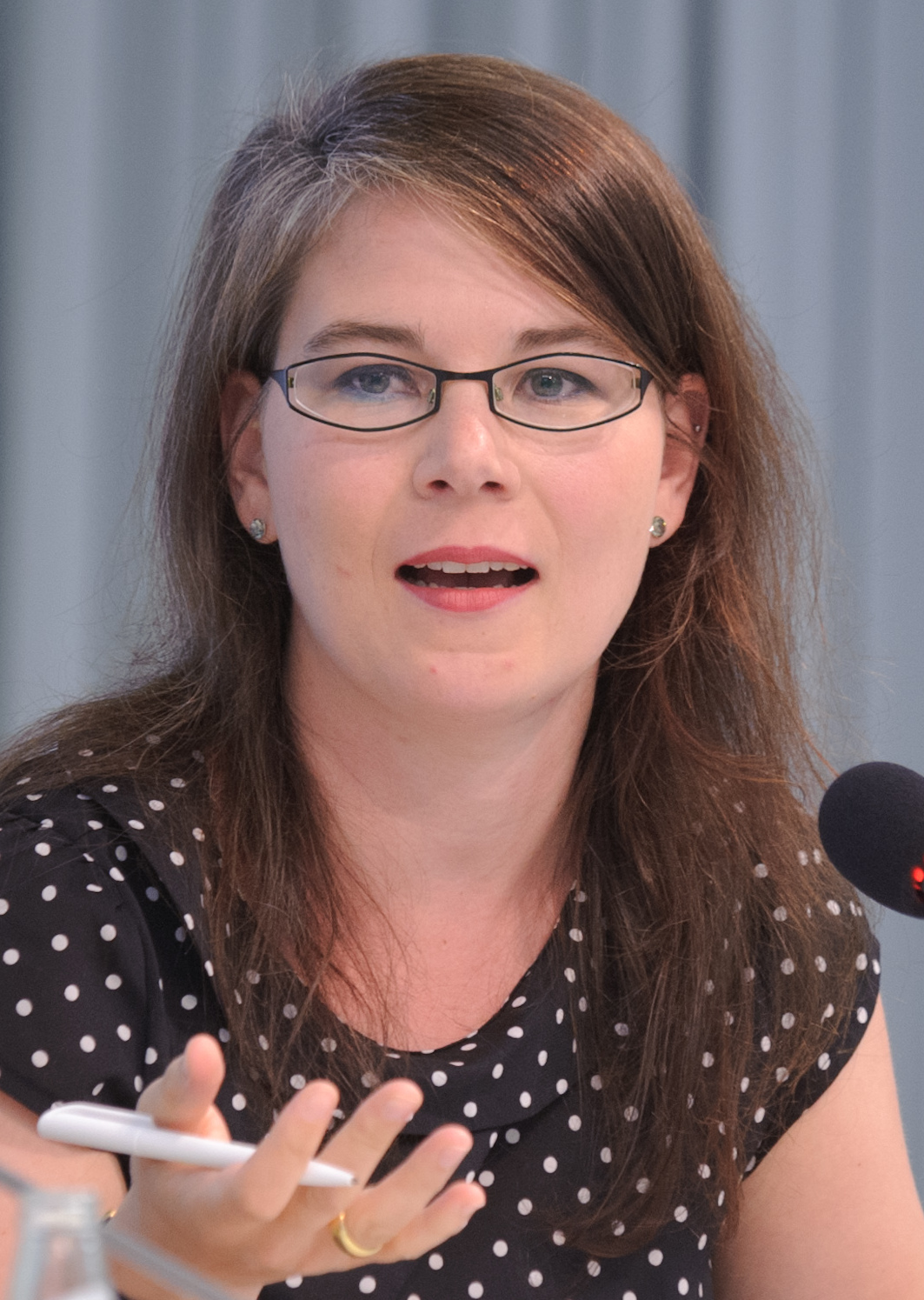
Baerbock in 2012

Baerbock became a member of Alliance 90/The Greens in 2005. In October 2008, she was elected to the executive board of her party's state group in Brandenburg. The next year she succeeded Ska Keller as co-chair of the board (with Benjamin Raschke), an office she held until 2013.

Baerbock served as the national spokesperson for the Green Party's working group on European affairs from 2008 to 2013. From 2009 to 2012, she was a member of the executive board of the European Green Party, under the leadership of co-chairs Philippe Lamberts and Monica Frassoni.

=== Member of the German Bundestag: 2013–2025 ===
In 2009, Baerbock unsuccessfully ran for a place on her party's electoral list for the federal elections. In 2013, she was the Green Party candidate in the constituency of Potsdam – Potsdam-Mittelmark II – Teltow-Fläming II and also secured the leading spot on the party's electoral list for the State of Brandenburg. Through the electoral list, she became a member of the Bundestag.

During her first term, Baerbock was a member of the Committee on Economic Affairs and Energy and the Committee on European Affairs. In her parliamentary group, she served as speaker for climate policy. In the latter capacity, she participated in the United Nations Climate Change Conferences in Warsaw (2013), Lima (2014), Paris (2015) and Marrakesh (2016).

Baerbock served as deputy chair of the Berlin-Taipei Parliamentary Circle of Friends and a member of the German-Polish Parliamentary Friendship Group from 2014 until 2017.

In the 2017 election, Baerbock was again the leading candidate in the state of Brandenburg, retaining her seat in Parliament. After the election, she was a member of the Green Party's negotiating team in the (unsuccessful) coalition talks with the CDU/CSU and FDP. She has since been a member of the Committee on Families, Seniors, Women and Youth.

Baerbock retained her seat, again as leading candidate on the Brandenburg party list, in the 2021 and 2025 elections. She resigned as member of the Bundestag, effective 30 June 2025, following the nomination to a position with the United Nations.

=== Co-leader of the Green Party: 2018–2022 ===
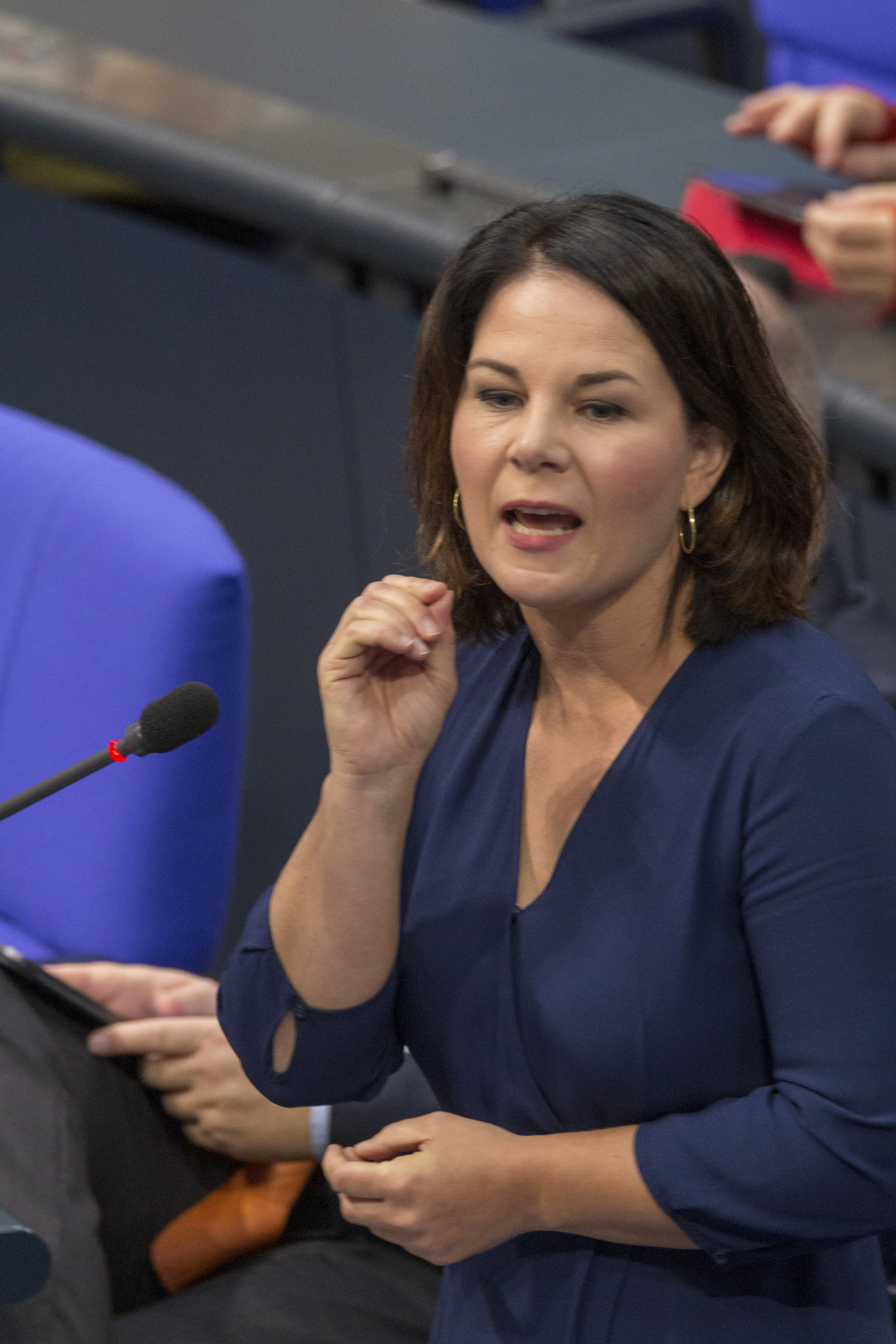
Baerbock speaking in the Bundestag, October 2020

On 27 January 2018, at the Green Party's national convention in her hometown of Hanover, Baerbock was elected as one of two equal chairpersons of her party at the federal level, with Robert Habeck. She won 64% of the vote, more than her challenger, Anja Piel. At a 2019 party convention, she was re-elected with 97.1% of the votes, the highest-ever result for a party chair.

In the negotiations to form a coalition government under the leadership of Minister-President of Brandenburg Dietmar Woidke after the 2019 state elections, Baerbock was a member of her party's delegation.

=== Chancellor candidate: 2021 ===
On 19 April 2021, the federal board of the Greens officially nominated Baerbock as candidate for chancellor for the 2021 federal election – the first time the party had nominated a single candidate instead of co-leaders. This was formally confirmed at the party congress from 11 to 13 June. Baerbock is the second woman after Angela Merkel to seek the highest government office, and the first woman nominated by her party. On election day, she was only 12 days older than Guido Westerwelle in 2002, the youngest chancellor candidate ever. On 12 June 2021, Baerbock was confirmed as candidate for chancellor after receiving 98.5% of the confirmation votes. In the 2021 German federal election, she again ran in the constituency of Potsdam – Potsdam-Mittelmark II – Teltow-Fläming II, this time against fellow chancellor candidate Olaf Scholz. She lost the constituency to Scholz by over 15,000 votes, but was nonetheless elected to the Bundestag through the Green list in Brandenburg.

During this time, plagiarism by Baerbock in her 2021 book Now. How we renew our country (Jetzt. Wie wir unser Land erneuern) came to light, with Baerbock becoming the latest in a series of German politicians found to have plagiarised since the 2011-Guttenberg scandal. In the book, Baerbock included work of other authors without attributing that work to them thereby falsely presenting it as her own, with one researcher, Stefan Weber, detailing 100 instances of plagiarism before ceasing to look further.

Around the same time, scrutiny of Baerbock's published CV revealed falsehoods. For example, Baerbock claimed membership of the German Marshall Fund and United Nations High Commissioner for Refugees when she, in fact, was not a member. While she did have associations with these and other minor institutions, the claims in her CV were exaggerated. Similarly, statements about her education were misleading and her professional career incorrect. These revelations triggered widespread condemnation in the German public.

According to studies conducted by the German Marshall Fund and the Institute for Strategic Dialogue, both German and Russian state-backed sources have targeted Baerbock, spreading a large amount of disinformation, from false assumptions about the Greens to explicit sexism, such as the circulated online image featuring Baerbock's face photoshopped onto a naked female body with the caption "I was young and I needed the money".

Under Baerbock's leadership, the Greens won 14.8% of the national vote in 2021 and 118 seats in the Bundestag, the best result in the party's history. However, the performance was considered somewhat disappointing as the party finished third after having led in some polls earlier in the year.

=== Foreign minister: 2021–2025 ===
Before the 2021 election, Wolfgang Streeck wrote that Baerbock harboured strong Atlanticist and pro-NATO views and would follow a foreign policy aligned with that of U.S. President Joe Biden.

Following the 2021 German federal election, the Greens agreed to enter government with the FDP and the Social Democrats, as part of a traffic light coalition led by Olaf Scholz. Baerbock was named Foreign Minister and took office on 8 December 2021, the first woman ever to hold the role.

Baerbock visited Warsaw in December 2021 to meet with the Polish Foreign Minister Zbigniew Rau. They discussed Poland's dispute with the EU over the rule of law and the superiority of European Union law. Baerbock backed Poland's efforts to stop the flow of migrants seeking entry in EU territories from Belarus. She rejected the notion of Germany paying further World War II reparations to Poland. Germany asserts that Poland renounced all reparation rights under a 1953 agreement and that the dispute is settled. Poland rejects this view, stating that the Polish government was then under the sway of the Soviet Union and that its 1953 agreement is non-binding, somewhat similar to the manner in which German reunification was predicated upon Germany's renouncing explicitly any possible claims to the former eastern territories of Germany including East Prussia, most of Silesia, as well as the eastern parts of Brandenburg and Pomerania in the Two Plus Four Agreement.

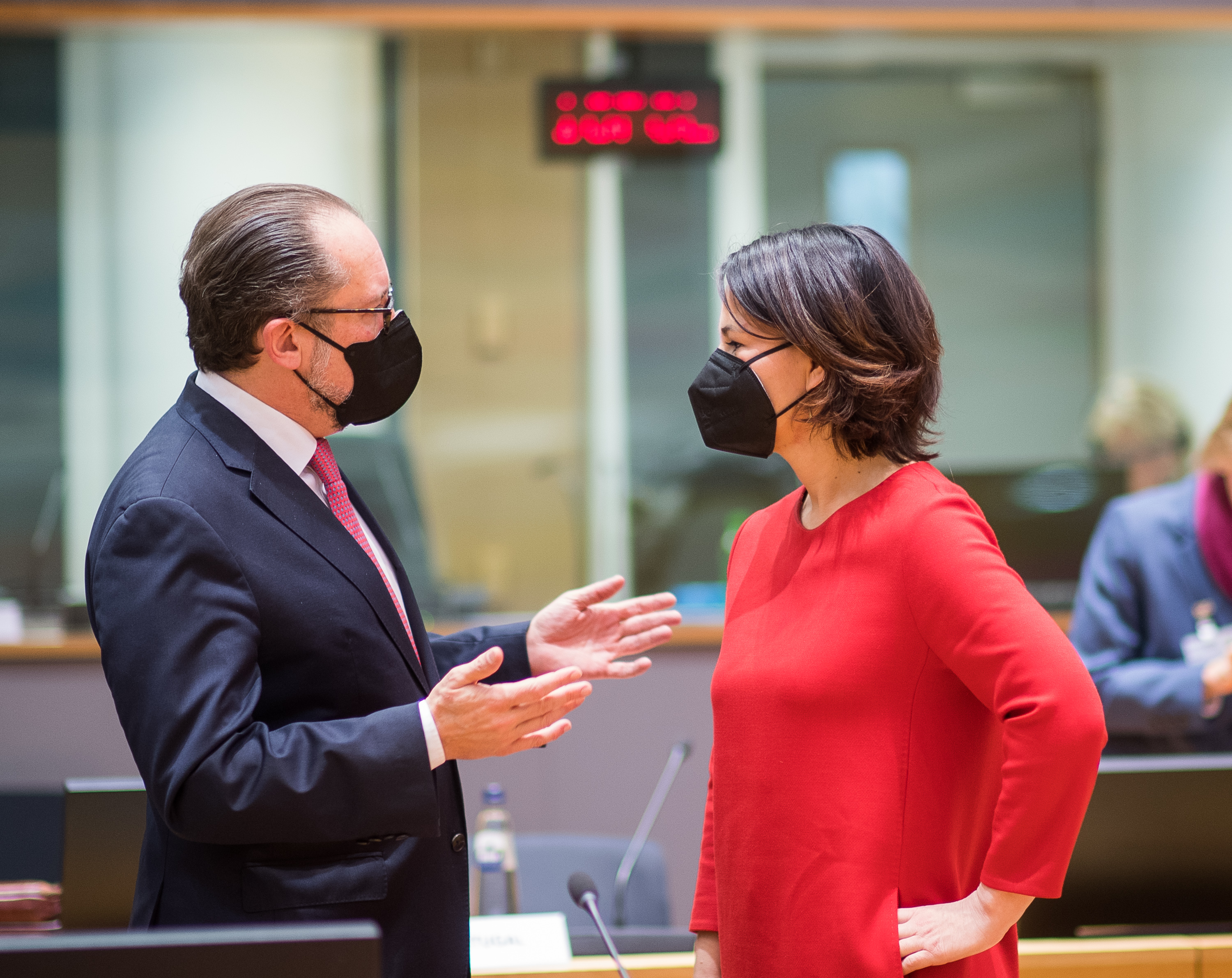
Baerbock and Austrian Foreign Minister Alexander Schallenberg in Brussels, on 24 January 2022

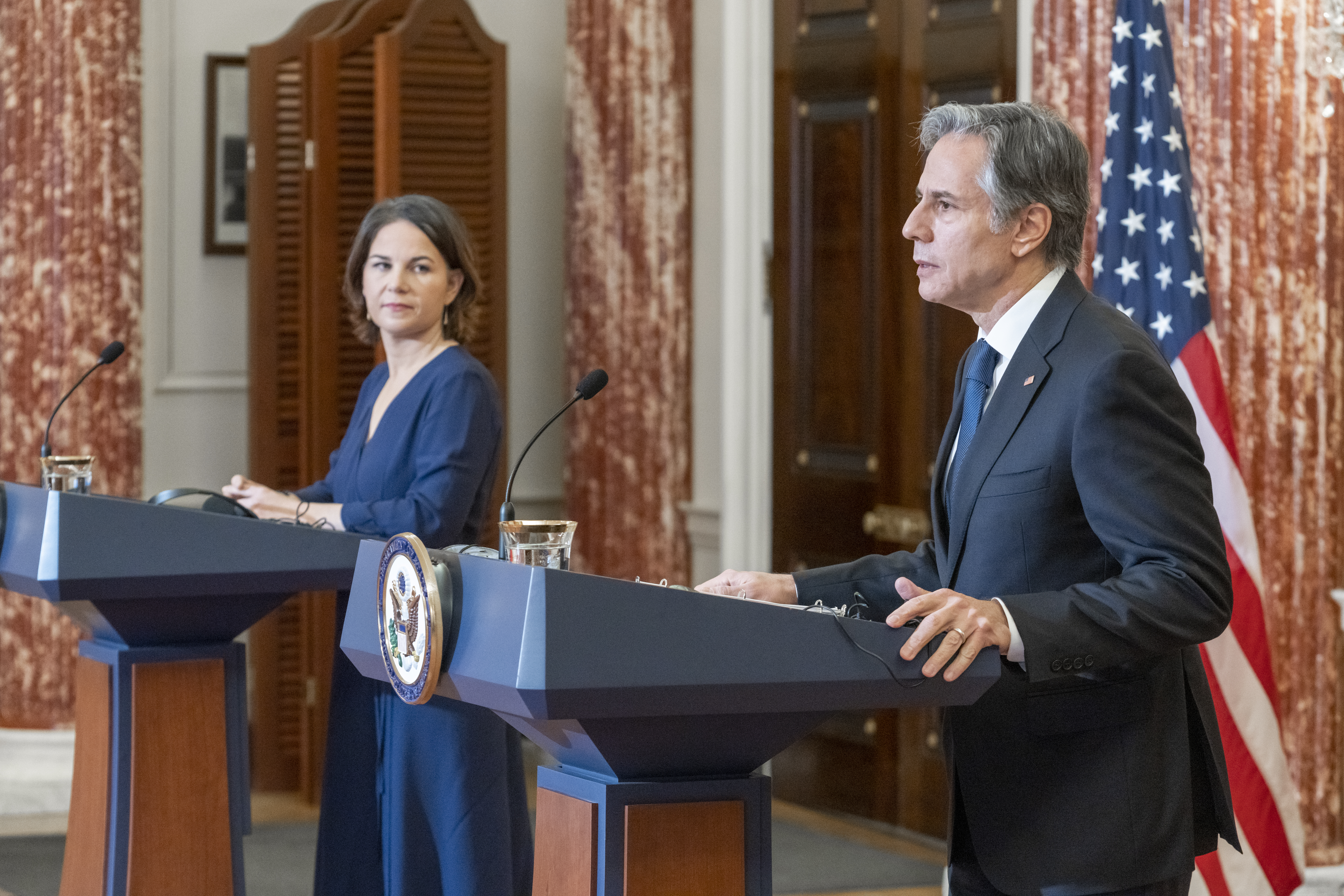
Foreign Minister Baerbock with the U.S. Secretary of State Antony Blinken in Washington, D.C., in January 2022

On 23 December 2021, Baerbock warned that Afghanistan is "heading into the worst humanitarian catastrophe of our time", with major economic sectors collapsing and more than 24 million people in need of humanitarian assistance. She said, "We cannot allow hundreds of thousands of children to die because we don't want to take action." She also promised to speed up the evacuation of more than 15,000 vulnerable Afghans, including staff who worked for Germany and their family members.

When Germany held the rotating presidency of the Group of Seven (G7) in 2022, Baerbock chaired the meetings of G7 Ministers of Foreign Affairs.

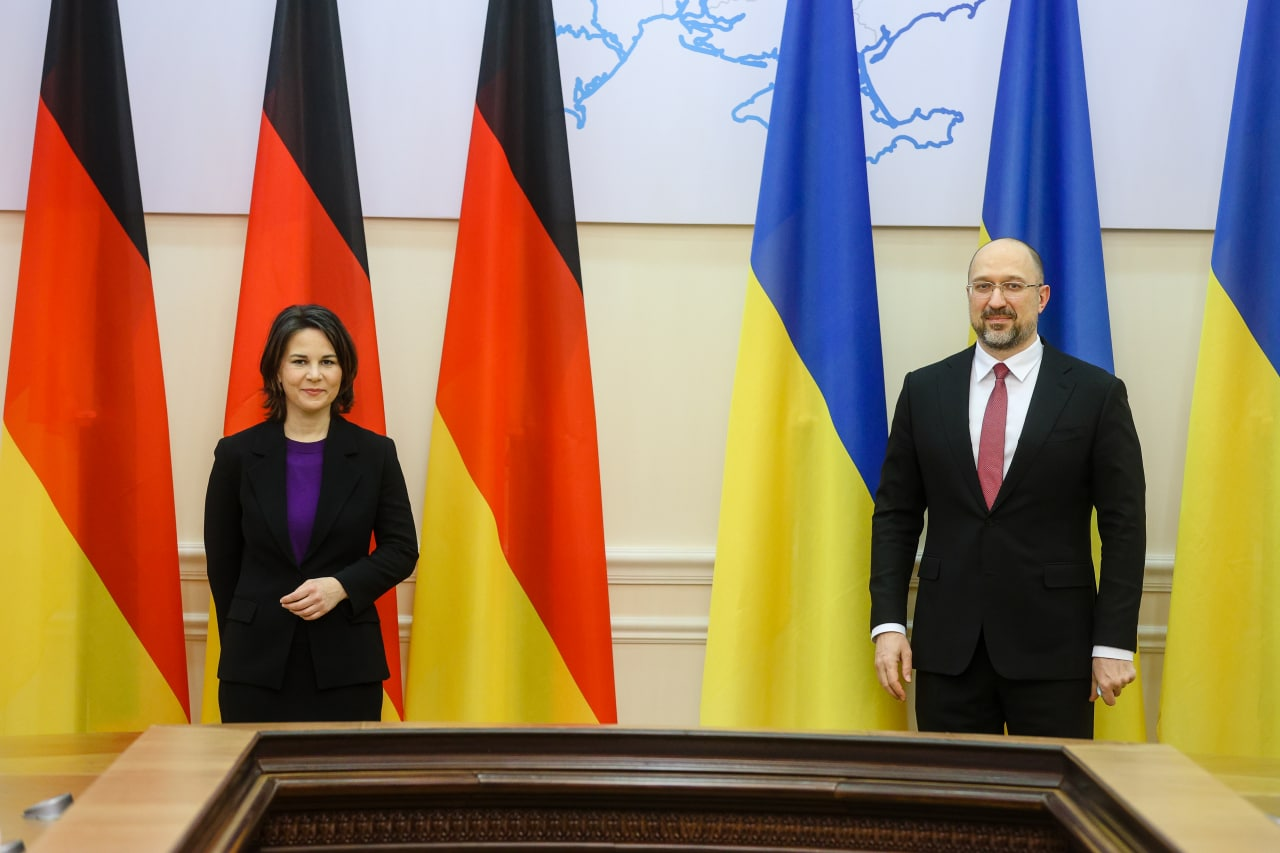
Baerbock meeting with Ukrainian Prime Minister Denys Shmyhal in Kyiv, on 7 February 2022

In January 2022, Baerbock refused to supply German weapons to Ukraine amid rising tensions on the Ukraine-Russia border, while the NATO allies including the United States opted to send arms in support of Ukraine. In the aftermath of the Russian invasion of Ukraine in February 2022, she argued against blocking Russian access to SWIFT. Following the Bucha massacre in April 2022, she expelled 40 Russian diplomats and embassy staff from Berlin, joining other European Union countries in their response to war crimes perpetrated by Russian troops in Ukraine. Also in April 2022, she hosted a donor conference during which European and international governments agreed to extend €659.5 million (US$718.6 million) in aid to Moldova, which hosted more than 100,000 refugees from Ukraine at the time.

In July 2022, she rejected Turkey's territorial claims to Greek islands in the Aegean Sea, stating that "Lesbos, Chios, Rhodes and many others are Greek territories and nobody has the right to question them." She warned that Turkey's threat to launch a new offensive against Kurdish forces in northern Syria will only help the Islamic State jihadists.

In January 2023, Baerbock and French Foreign Minister Catherine Colonna arrived in Ethiopia and met Ethiopian Prime Minister Abiy Ahmed on a mission to support the Ethiopia–Tigray peace agreement ending the Tigray War.

In January 2023, Baerbock made her third visit to Ukraine by touring Kharkiv, following her travels to Bucha in May and Kyiv in September of the previous year. In a keynote speech to the Parliamentary Assembly of the Council of Europe on 24 January, she said in English "We are fighting a war against Russia, not against each other", which was critically portrayed in the popular tabloid newspaper Bild with the headline "We are at war with Russia". Her phrasing received criticism from conservative and right-wing politicians in Germany as demonstrating un-professionalism, and criticism from Russia. A German Foreign Ministry spokesman said that Germany was not a party to the conflict and the speech was in a context of establishing a unified stance in opposition to a war of aggression.

In March 2023, on a visit to Baghdad, Baerbock called on Iran to cease its missile attacks on Iraqi territory.

In May 2023, she urged China to take a clear stance on the Russo-Ukrainian War, saying "neutrality means taking the side of the aggressor.", after the General Secretary of the Chinese Communist Party Xi Jinping first visited Vladimir Putin in Russia, and later on the next day visited Ukraine, with offending Russian dissidents and opponents of Vladimir Putin while being in Ukraine.

In September 2023, she named the CCP General Secretary Xi Jinping "a dictator" next to Russian President Vladimir Putin, that followed the U.S. President Joe Biden referring to Xi "a dictator" in June.

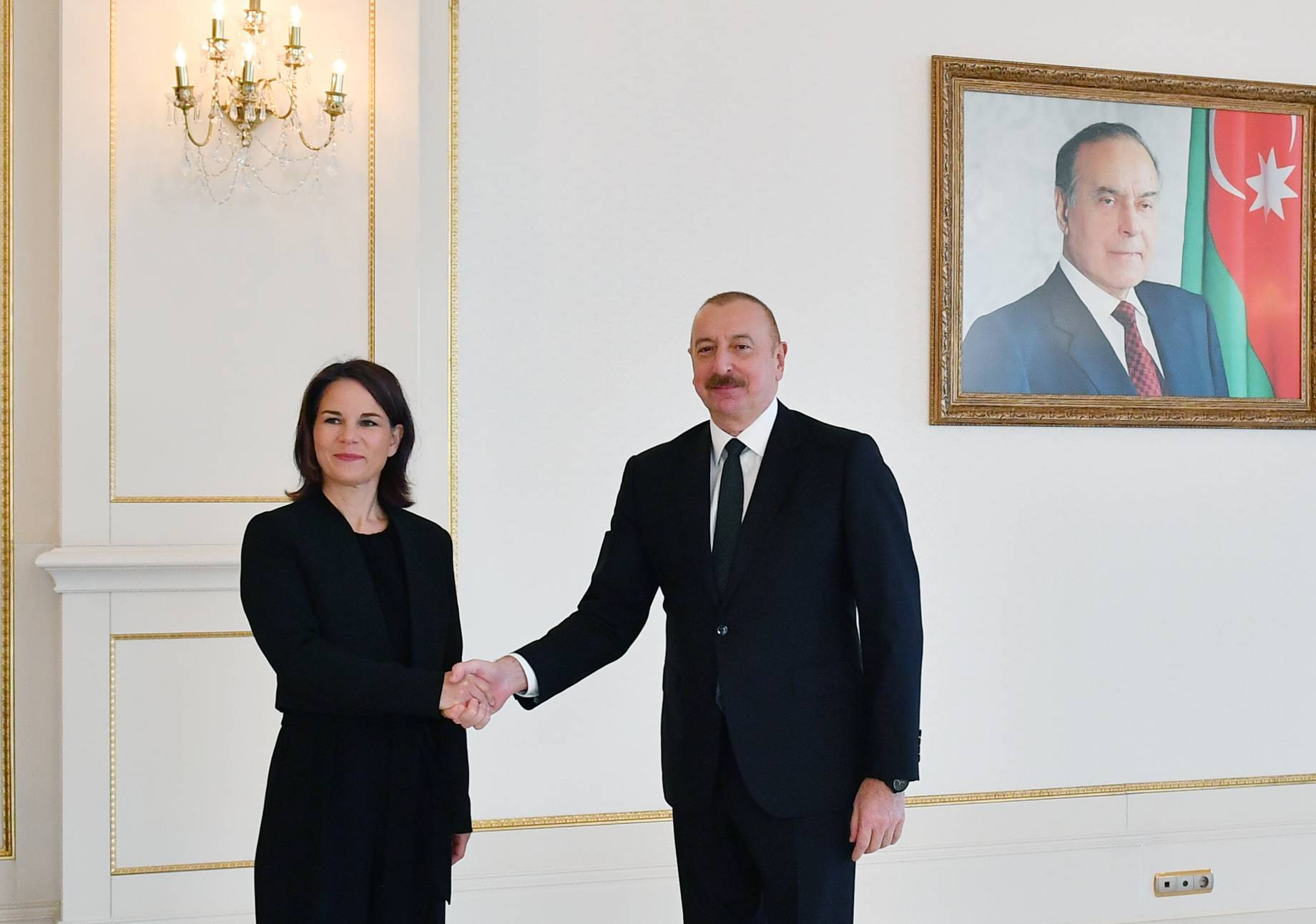
Baerbock with Azerbaijani President Ilham Aliyev on 4 November 2023

In May 2023, she visited Saudi Arabia and praised Saudi efforts to find a solution to the wars in Yemen and Sudan.

After on 6 July 2023, U.S. President Joe Biden authorized the provision of cluster munitions to Ukraine in support of a Ukrainian counter-offensive against Russian forces in Russian-occupied regions in Southeastern Ukraine Baerbock opposed the decision to supply cluster munitions to Ukraine.

In September 2023, Baerbock accused Azerbaijan of breaking its promise not to resort to military action in Armenian-held Nagorno-Karabakh and called on it to halt the offensive and return to negotiations. In February 2024, she played host to the foreign ministers of Azerbaijan and Armenia for two days of peace talks in Berlin.

During the Gaza war, Baerbock expressed support for Israel and its right to self-defense. On 11 November 2023, she visited Israel to express solidarity with the country. Baerbock rejected calls for a ceasefire but supported "humanitarian pauses" to deliver aid to Palestinian civilians in Gaza. She stated that "For Germany, Israel's security is non-negotiable." She pointed to Germany's "historic and moral responsibility to the Jewish people and the Israeli state" because of the Holocaust. She and UK Foreign Secretary David Cameron wrote a joint article published in The Sunday Times on 17 December 2023 calling for actions which would "pav[e] the way to a sustainable ceasefire in Gaza".

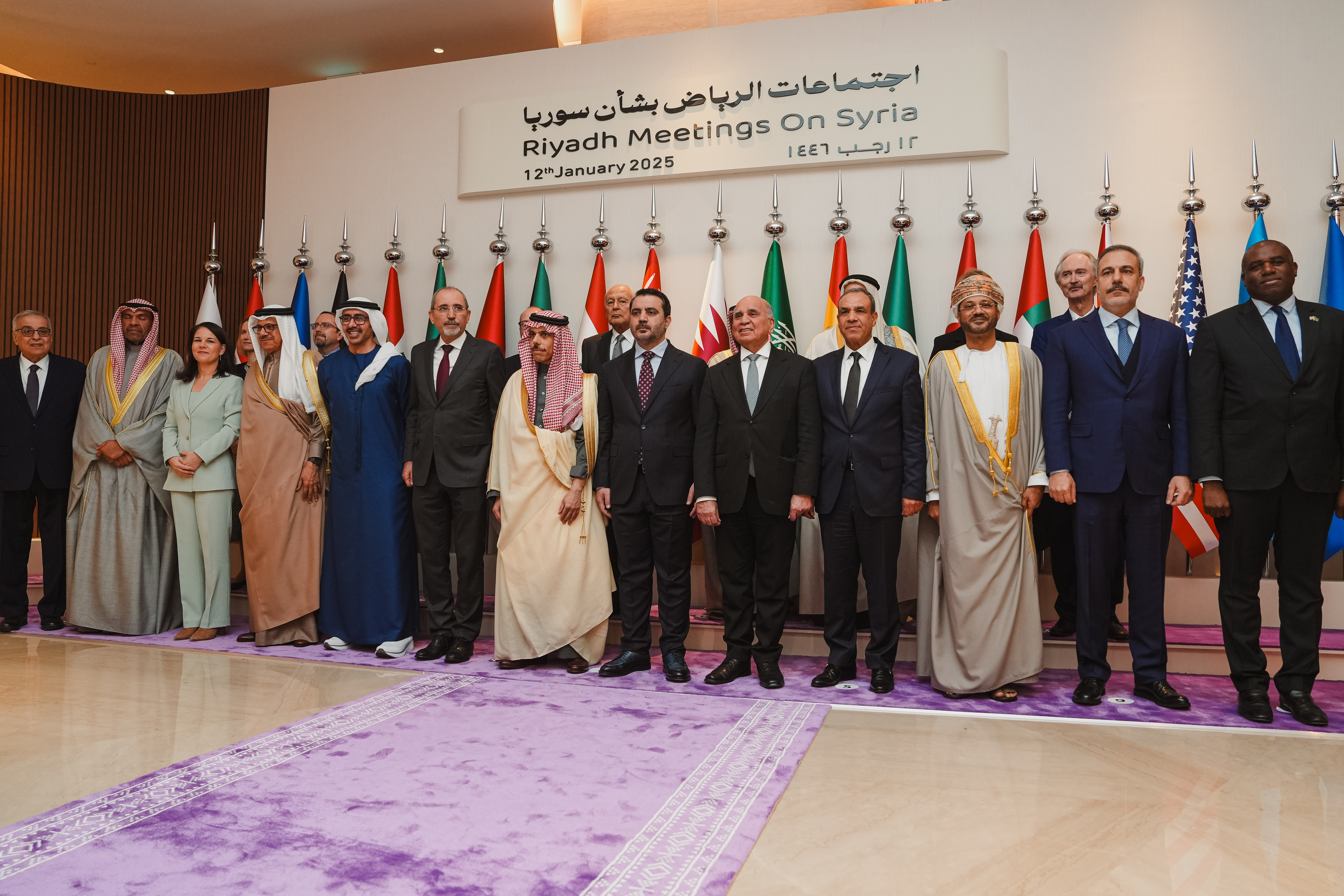
Baerbock at the Riyadh Meetings on Syria in Riyadh, Saudi Arabia on 12 January 2025

Francesca Albanese, incumbent UN Special Rapporteur on the occupied Palestinian territories, criticised Baerbock following Baerbock's speech in the German Bundestag on 7 October 2024, in which she alluded to Israeli attacks on Palestinian civilian sites as "self-defense" and said that "that's what Germany stands for". Though civilian sites can lose protected status if used for military purposes, under international law they still cannot be attacked if the harm to civilians will be disproportionate. Furthermore, Article 52 of the Protocol Additional to the Geneva Conventions states that “In case of doubt whether an object which is normally dedicated to civilian purposes, such as a place of worship, a house or other dwelling or a school, is being used to make an effective contribution to military action, it shall be presumed not to be so used”.

In January 2025, Baerbock and her French counterpart Jean-Noël Barrot visited Damascus to meet Ahmed al-Sharaa, the de facto leader of Syria since December 2024, on behalf of the European Union, thereby becoming the first ministers from the EU to visit the country since the fall of the Assad regime. Despite shaking hands with Jean-Noël Barrot, al-Sharaa did not shake hands with Baerbock.

== President of the United Nations General Assembly: 2025−2026 ==
Annalena Baerbock assumed the office of President of the United Nations General Assembly (UNGA) for the 80^{th} session on 9 September 2025, succeeding Philémon Yang of Cameroon. Elected by the General Assembly in June 2025, she took office during a period marked by heightened geopolitical tensions, armed conflicts, financial pressures on the United Nations, and debates over the future of multilateralism.

Under the theme of “Better Together”, Baerbock urged Member States to use the General Assembly as a forum for dialogue when consensus proved elusive elsewhere in the UN system. In her opening address to the 80th session, she emphasized the need for Member States to work together despite geopolitical divisions and called for renewed commitment to the principles of the United Nations Charter.

Baerbock's presidency was characterized by her focus on defending multilateral cooperation during a period of geopolitical fragmentation with her tenure marked by efforts to preserve dialogue among Member States, strengthen the role of the General Assembly, and advance discussions on institutional reform, gender equality, governance of artificial intelligence, and the future leadership of the United Nations.

Her term concluded at the closing of the General Assembly's 80th session on 8 September 2026; she was succeeded by Khalilur Rahman of Bangladesh.

Security Council veto initiative debates

One of the most prominent features of Baerbock's presidency was her oversight of debates convened under the General Assembly's "veto initiative", adopted in 2022. Under the mechanism, the General Assembly automatically meets when a permanent member of the Security Council exercises its veto power, allowing Member States to discuss the circumstances surrounding the veto and its implications for international peace and security.

During the 80th session, Baerbock presided over two such debates following Security Council vetoes by permanent members. In her remarks, she described the initiative as an important accountability mechanism and argued that the debates demonstrated the continuing relevance of the General Assembly when the Security Council was unable to act. She also linked the veto discussions to broader debates on Security Council reform, describing reform of the Council as one of the most pressing institutional challenges facing the United Nations.

Selection and Appointment of the next Secretary-General

Baerbock played a central role in the selection and appointment process for the tenth Secretary-General of the United Nations. As President of the General Assembly, she worked with Member States to promote a transparent and inclusive process, convening interactive dialogues that allowed candidates to share their vision for the future of the Organization and respond to questions on the global challenges facing the United Nations, and a global televised town hall that included questions from member states, civil society representatives, and UN staff.

Throughout the process, she repeatedly highlighted the importance of geographic diversity, merit-based selection, and gender equality. In numerous interviews and statements, Baerbock noted that in the UN’s 80-year history no woman had been selected to lead the organization, despite women and girls making up half the world’s population. UN Member States, noting this lack of inclusion, called for the nomination of women candidates for the position of Secretary-General in UN General Assembly Resolution A/79/327.

United Nations reform and institutional challenges

Another major priority of Baerbock's presidency was support for institutional reform efforts aimed at strengthening the United Nations. As the organization faced budgetary constraints and increasing political divisions among Member States, she endorsed initiatives intended to improve effectiveness, transparency, and coordination across the UN system.

Baerbock was a supporter of Secretary-General António Guterres's UN80 reform initiative and frequently argued that multilateral institutions needed to adapt to contemporary challenges while preserving the principles of the UN Charter. She promoted discussions on Security Council reform, revitalization of the General Assembly, and implementation of the UN80 initiative, which sought to modernize aspects of the organization's work.

During her term, the UN also demonstrated that it could address 21^{st} century challenges, including global governance of artificial intelligence and other emerging technologies by appointing the first ever Independent International Scientific Panel on AI composed of experts from around the world to ensure that international deliberations are informed by the best available evidence.

The UN also convened the Global Dialogue on AI Governance in July 2026 in Geneva, Switzerland to address the risks posed by the technology while harnessing the opportunities for the global community.

In her address at the opening of the dialogue on 6 July 2026, Baerbock noted that “the potential and peril of AI were too significant, too far-reaching and too consequential to be left to a few. That is precisely why this global dialogue matters. Because something with such power, with such profound implications for our economies, our social systems, our defence and therefore our peace and security — but especially, even in our homes, our food and our children’s bedrooms—can only be meaningfully and safely managed together.”

Advocacy for women's rights

Women's rights emerged as one of the defining themes of Baerbock's presidency. She frequently drew attention to the situation of women and girls in Afghanistan following restrictions imposed by the Taliban, describing their exclusion from education, public life, and employment as a challenge to universal human rights.

Baerbock also highlighted the impact of armed conflict on women and girls. During meetings devoted to gender equality and the thirtieth anniversary of the Beijing Declaration and Platform for Action, she emphasized the disproportionate effects of violence, displacement, and poverty on women in conflict zones.

Her presidency coincided with a period of noticeable pushback against women’s inclusion and empowerment. Baerbock repeatedly argued that gender equality should remain central to the organization's work and linked women's rights to broader questions of peace, development, and human security.

She also used her social media following to highlight the contributions of trailblazing women in fields around the world with her #LikeAWoman global digital campaign to change the narrative of what it means to lead like a woman.

== Political positions ==
=== Foreign policy ===
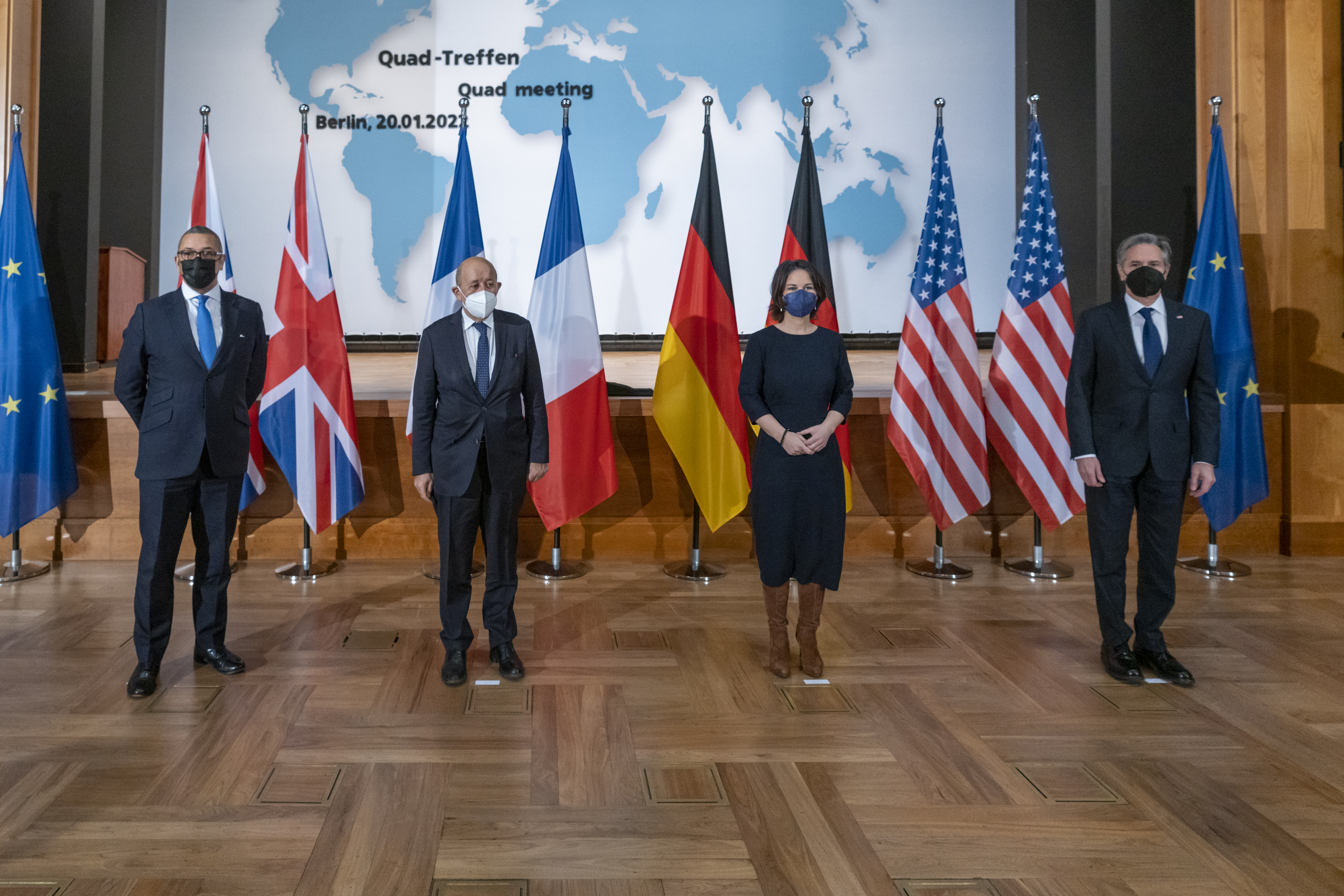
German Minister Baerbock and French Minister Jean-Yves Le Drian as European Union member states Foreign Ministers on meeting with the U.S. Secretary of State Antony Blinken and British Foreign Secretary James Cleverly in Berlin, 2022

Baerbock is regarded as taking a centrist line on defense and pushing for a stronger common EU foreign policy, especially against Russia and China. She has proposed a post-pacifist foreign policy, calling for a European army under the supervision of the European Parliament and outlining steps toward the denuclearization of Germany in consultation with allies. She supports NATO's eastward expansion and cooperation with the United States. In November 2020, she said: "Europe has been revolving around itself for years, the Trump administration turned its back on the world. Authoritarian states fill the gap that emerged. That leads to Russia or Turkey becoming active in our neighborhood – and the EU, as in the case of Nagorno-Karabakh, is left out." In December 2021, Baerbock proposed a "values-driven" foreign policy in conjunction with other European democracies and NATO partners, and called on the EU to implement sanctions against Bosnian Serb leader Milorad Dodik.

Baerbock appears to have taken a pro-Israel stance in response to the 2021 Israel–Palestine crisis. She called the number of UN resolutions criticizing Israel "absurd compared to resolutions against other states." Baerbock expressed "concern" over the legal and constitutional implications of the proposed 2023 Israeli judicial reform. In 2025, following the meeting between Trump and Zelenskyy, Baerbock said Trump's conduct represented a "new era of ruthlessness" and called on European countries to "defend the rules-based international order and the strength of law more than ever against the power of the strongest".

=== Energy, climate, and environmental policy ===
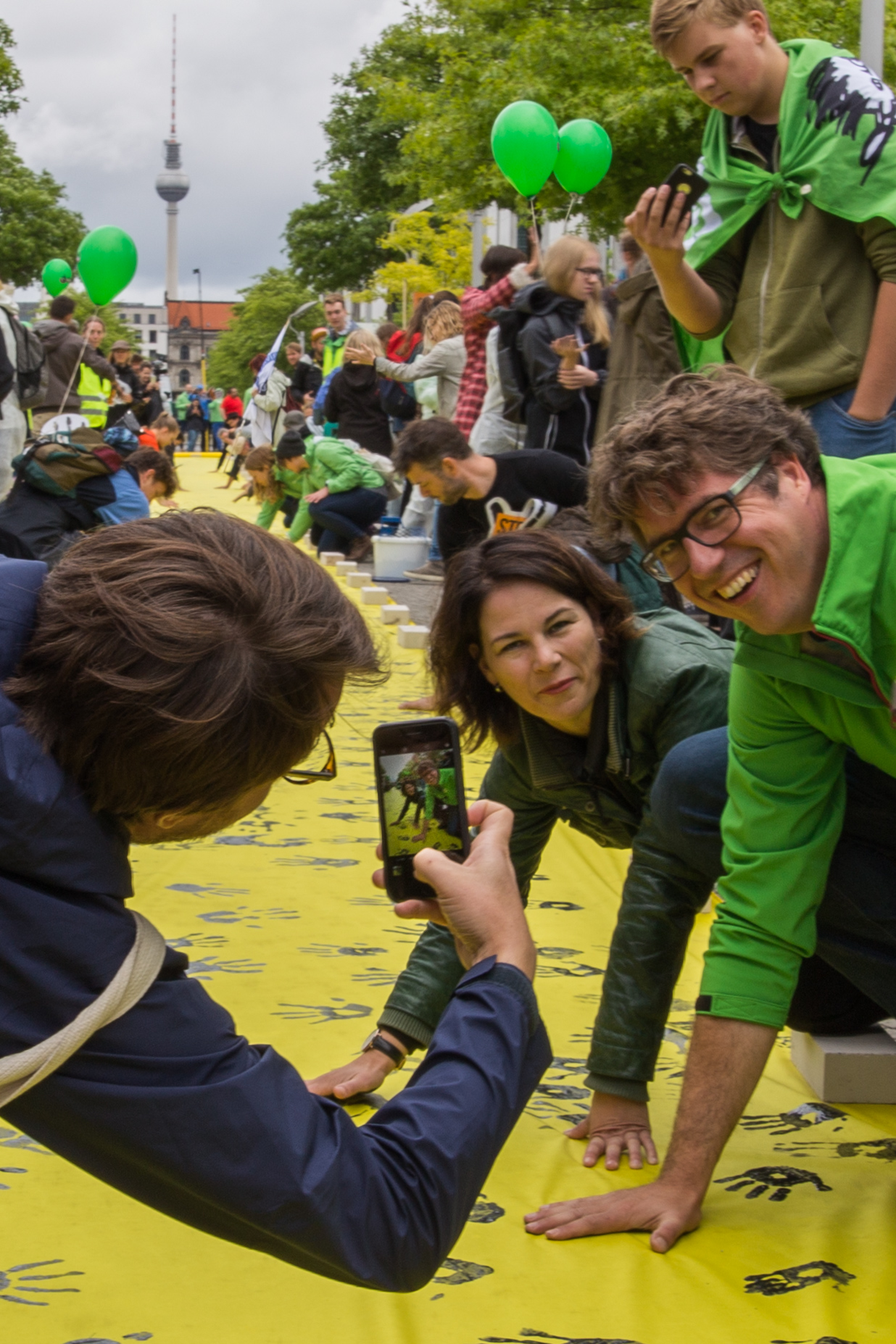
Baerbock with Green Party secretary Michael Kellner at an anti-coal protest in Berlin (2018)

Baerbock has argued in favor of a European and trans-Atlantic Green Deal. She has cited a need for technology transfer so that countries worldwide can limit the increase in global temperatures to 1.5 °C (2.7 °F), as outlined in the Paris Agreement. Baerbock opposes the Nord Stream 2 gas pipeline project between Russia and Europe.

Baerbock has called for phasing out of coal use in Germany by 2030, implementation of a speed limit of 130 kilometers per hour (81 mph), and restriction of registration to emission-free cars "by 2030 at the latest". She has said that "agricultural subsidies should be oriented towards the common good" and that livestock animal populations and meat production should be "reduced very significantly". Baerbock has also said that "climate policy is not in contradiction to the economy" and that she wishes to preserve Germany's status as an industrial location "into the 21st century – in light of the Paris climate agreement". She supports the production of climate-neutral steel and has expressed support for climate tariffs – international taxes on carbon-intensive goods. Under her policies, domestic German flights would be made "superfluous" by 2035 by strengthening the rail network.

When the Federal Constitutional Court ruled that the greenhouse gas reductions set out in the Climate Protection Act were insufficient on 29 April 2021, Baerbock held out the prospect of setting concrete greenhouse gas savings targets in the event that her party would participate in the federal government. She also called for the quota for the annual expansion of renewable energy sources to be doubled by the mid-2020s. Baerbock has said that environmental destruction caused by climate change is becoming increasingly expensive.

Baerbock is an opponent of nuclear power. In 2021, she opposed an EU proposal to label nuclear power as a green energy source.

=== Immigration ===
Amid the European migrant crisis in 2015, Baerbock joined fellow Green parliamentarians Luise Amtsberg, Franziska Brantner, Manuel Sarrazin, and Wolfgang Strengmann-Kuhn in calling for more responsibilities for the European Commission in managing the EU's intake of refugees, a clear mandate for Frontex, and EU-managed facilities for asylum seekers in their countries of origin.

In September 2023, Baerbock criticized the European Union's migration deal with Tunisia. She advocated the German government's financial support for NGOs, such as SOS Humanity, that rescue migrants in the Mediterranean.

== Other activities ==
=== Corporate boards ===
- KfW, Ex-Officio Member of the Board of Supervisory Directors (since 2021)

=== Non-profit organizations ===
- Villa Vigoni – German-Italian Centre for the European Dialogue, Ex-Officio Member of the Board of Trustees (since 2021)
- Alexander von Humboldt Foundation, Ex-Officio Member of the Board of Trustees (since 2021)
- European Council on Foreign Relations (ECFR), Member (since 2020)
- Leo Baeck Foundation, Member of the Board of Trustees
- German Federation for the Environment and Nature Conservation (BUND), Member

Since 2020, Baerbock has participated in the World Economic Forum's Young Global Leaders program, a group that has coached political representatives such as Emmanuel Macron, Sanna Marin and Jacinda Ardern.

== Personal life ==
Since 2007, Baerbock has been married to Daniel Holefleisch, a political consultant and PR manager who has been Senior Expert Corporate Affairs for Deutsche Post DHL Group since 2017, a lobbyist position. They have two daughters, born in 2011 and 2015. In 2013, they moved from Berlin to the Nauener Vorstadt district of Potsdam, Brandenburg. The couple announced their separation in November 2024.

Baerbock declares being Lutheran-Protestant. She does not consider herself a believer, but remains a member of the Protestant church because "the idea of togetherness is extremely important" to her.

== Bibliography ==
- Baerbock, Annalena (2021). Jetzt: Wie wir unser Land erneuern (in German). Berlin: Ullstein Verlag. ISBN 978-3-550-20190-5. LCCN 2020516638. OCLC 1260438163. OL 37804222M. Wikidata Q107395322.

Diplomatic posts
Preceded by Philémon Yang	President of the United Nations General Assembly; 2025–2026	Succeeded by Khalilur Rahman
