= Niedergörsdorf =

- Municipality
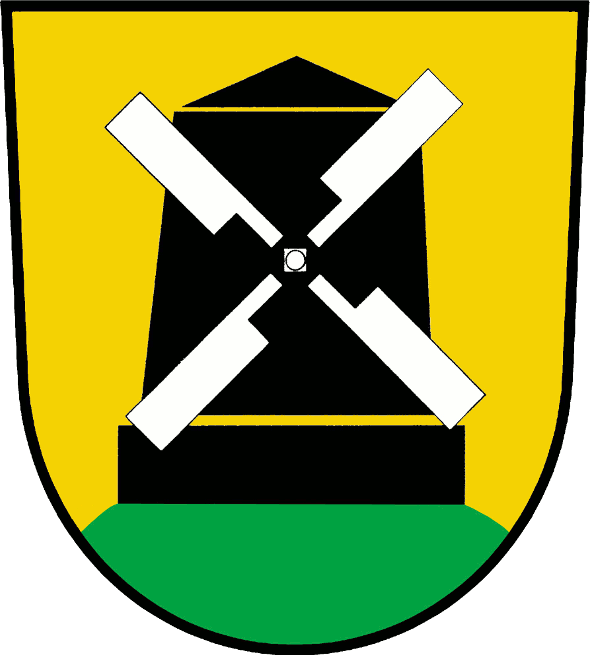
- Coat of arms

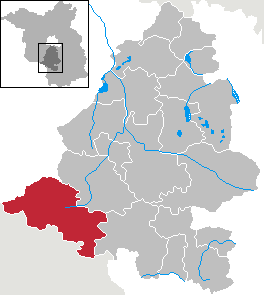
- Location of Niedergörsdorf within Teltow-Fläming district
- Interactive map of Niedergörsdorf
- Location within Germany Location within Brandenburg
- Coordinates: 51°59′N 13°0′E
- Country: Germany
- State: Brandenburg
- District: Teltow-Fläming
- Subdivisions: 22 Ortsteile

Government
  - Mayor (2018–26): Doreen Boßdorf

Area
  - Total: 204.67 km^{2} (79.02 sq mi)
- Elevation: 84 m (276 ft)

Population (2025-12-31)
  - Total: 6,150
  - Density: 30.0/km^{2} (77.8/sq mi)
- Time zone: UTC+01:00 (CET)
  - Summer (DST): UTC+02:00 (CEST)
- Postal codes: 14913
- Dialling codes: 033741
- Vehicle registration: TF
- Website: www.niedergoersdorf.de

Niedergörsdorf is a municipality in the Teltow-Fläming district of Brandenburg, Germany.

== Demography ==
Development of Population since 1875 within the Current Boundaries (Blue Line: Population; Dotted Line: Comparison to Population Development of Brandenburg state; Grey Background: Time of Nazi rule; Red Background: Time of Communist rule)

Recent Population Development and Projections (Population Development before Census 2011 (blue line); Recent Population Development according to the Census in Germany in 2011 (blue bordered line); Projections by the Brandenburg state for 2005-2030 (yellow line); for 2017-2030 (scarlet line), for 2020-2030 (green line)

Niedergörsdorf: Population development
within the current boundaries (2020)

Year	Pop.	±% p.a.
1875	4,915	—
1890	5,209	+0.39%
1910	5,697	+0.45%
1925	5,985	+0.33%
1939	10,538	+4.12%
1950	10,103	−0.38%
1964	7,883	−1.76%

Year	Pop.	±% p.a.
1971	7,816	−0.12%
1981	7,092	−0.97%
1985	7,141	+0.17%
1990	6,847	−0.84%
1995	7,450	+1.70%
2000	7,404	−0.12%
2005	6,854	−1.53%

Year	Pop.	±% p.a.
2010	6,285	−1.72%
2015	6,084	−0.65%
2016	6,105	+0.35%
2017	6,123	+0.29%
2018	6,200	+1.26%
2019	6,209	+0.15%
2020	6,141	−1.10%

== Photo gallery ==
Churches

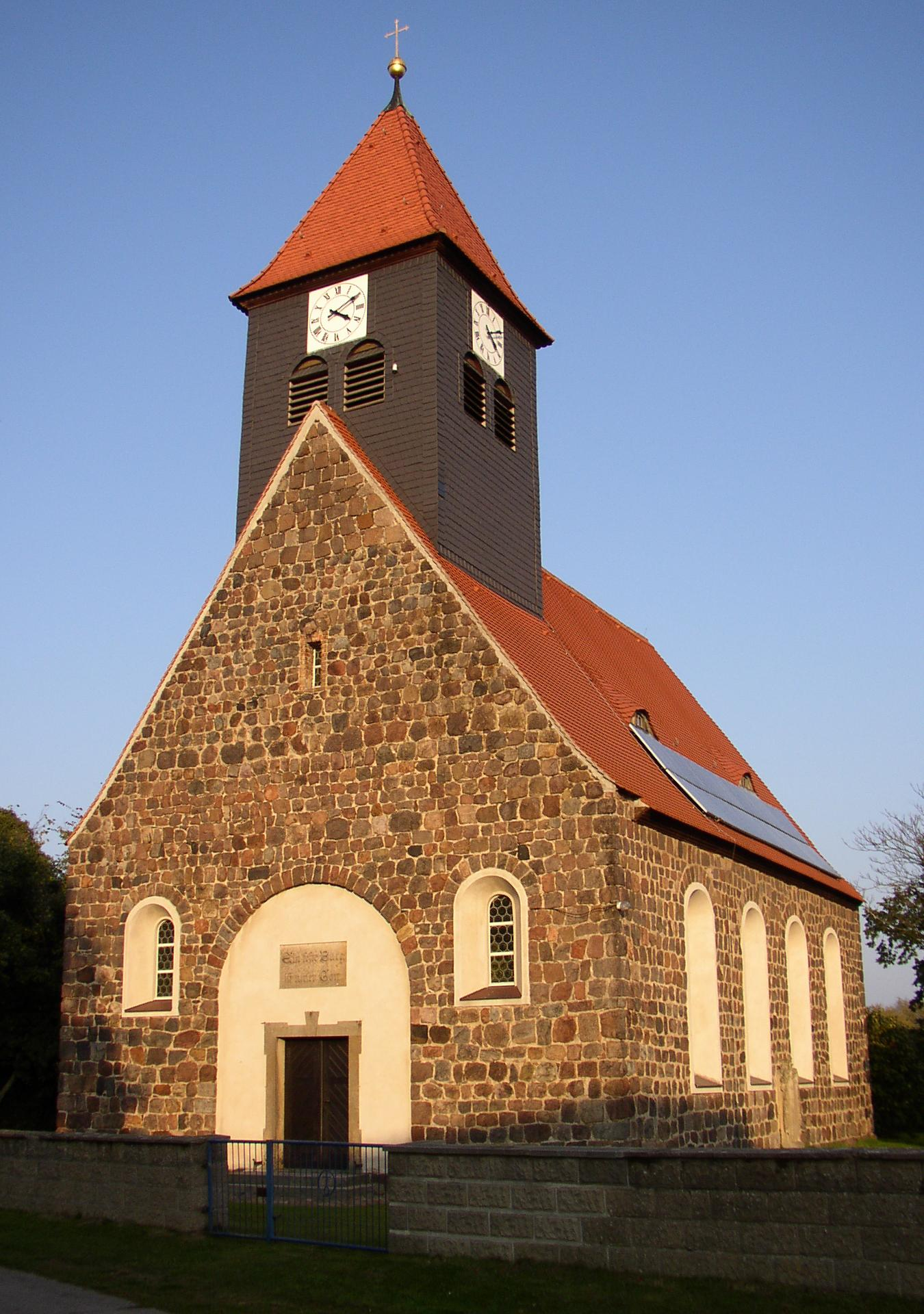
Blönsdorf

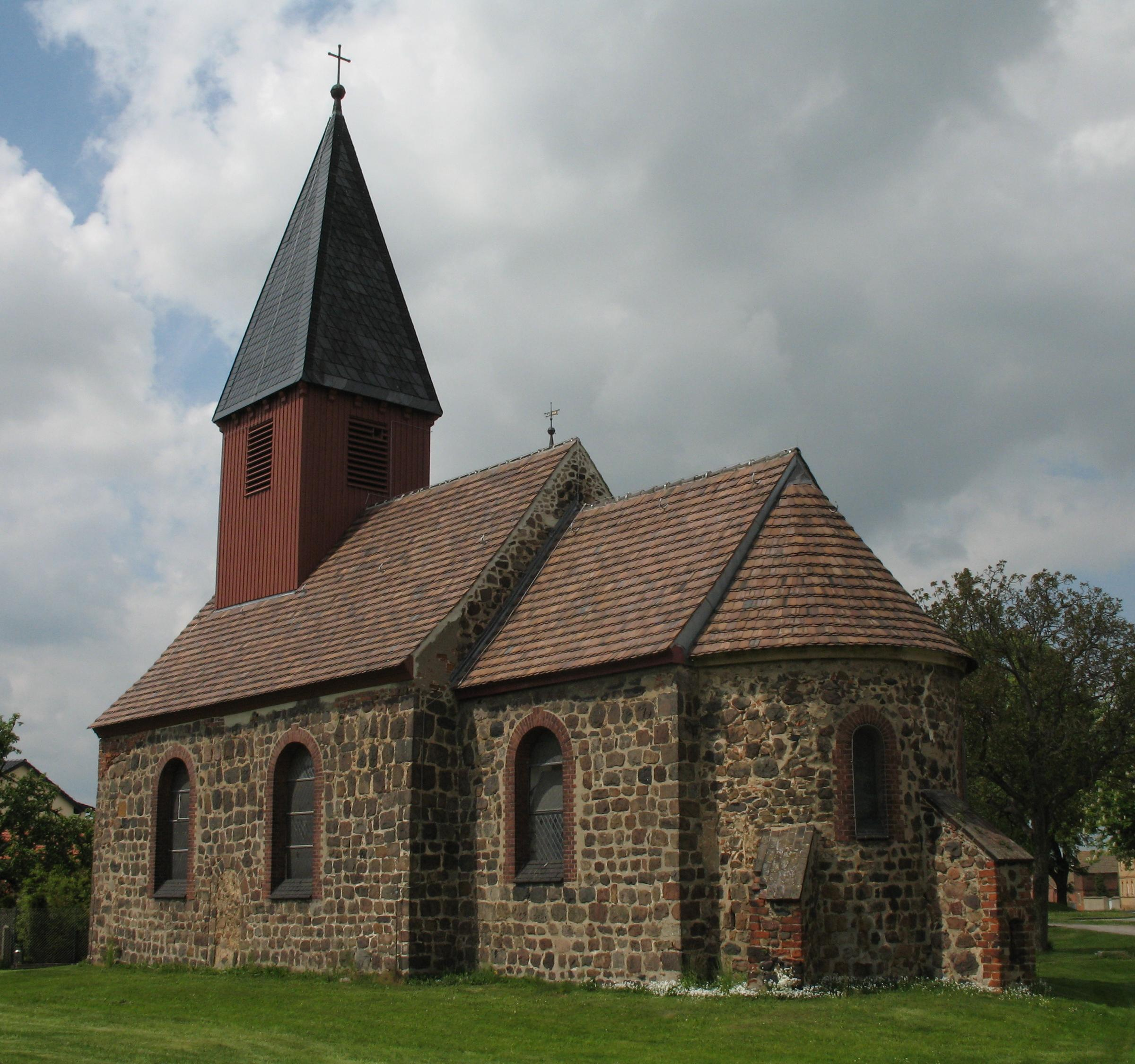
Mellnsdorf

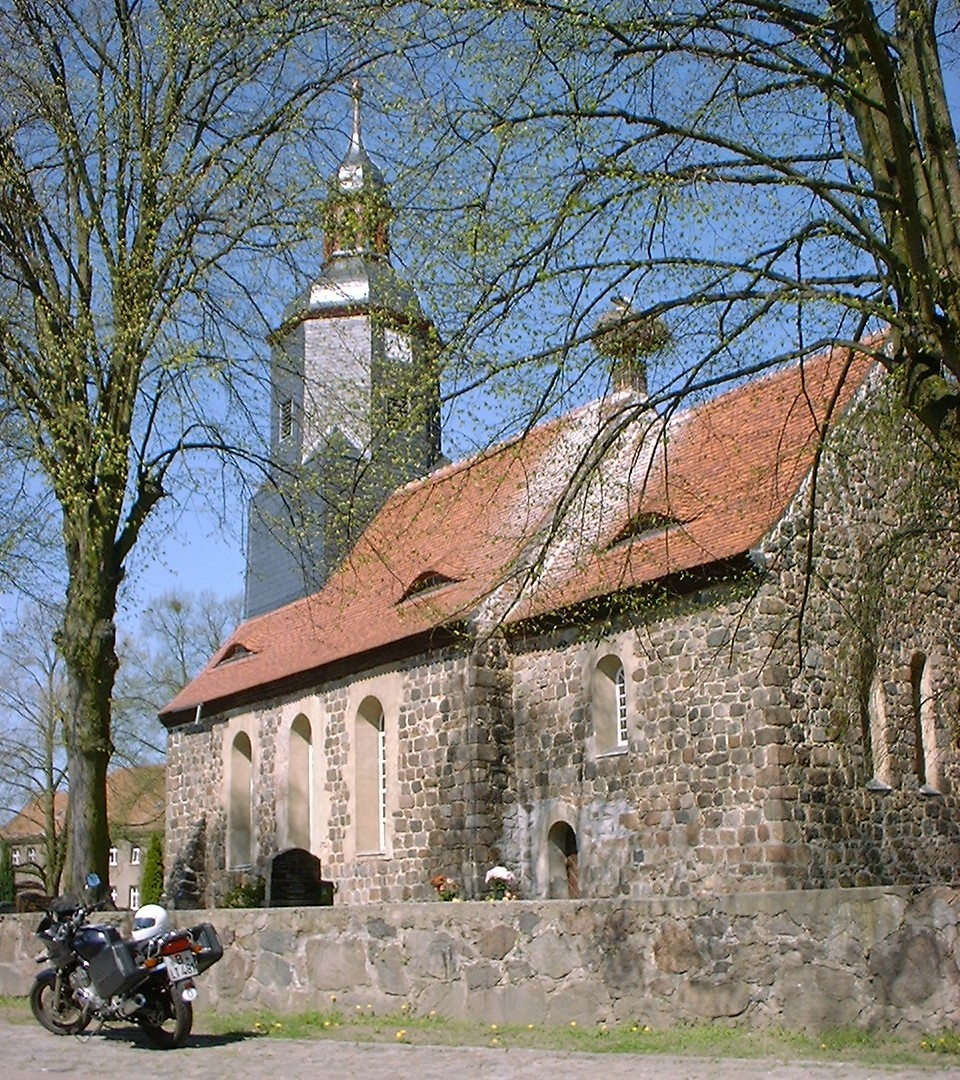
Seehausen

== See also ==
- Dennewitz
