= AfD Brandenburg =

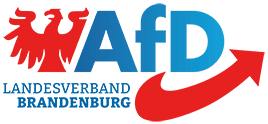
- Ideology: Right-wing populism
- Political position: Far-right
- National affiliation: Alternative for Germany
- Colors: Light blue
- Landtag of Brandenburg: 30 / 88

Website
- https://afd-brandenburg.de/

The AfD Brandenburg is the Brandenburg state association of the right-wing populist and Far right German party Alternative for Germany (AfD). Andreas Kalbitz served as state chairman until his membership was annulled on July 25, 2020. With Alexander Gauland, the state party ran for the first time in the 2014 state elections and entered the Brandenburg state parliament. For the 2017 federal election, Gauland also led the state list as co-leading candidate in the federal government, through which five representatives entered the 19th Bundestag.

The state association has been under observation by the Brandenburg Office for the Protection of the Constitution since mid-June 2020 as a suspected case of right-wing extremist activity.

AfD Brandenburg is considered a pioneer in the cooperation with far-right Nazi party "Die Heimat" (The Homeland). In June 2024, the first joint parliamentary groups at the municipal were formed by AfD members and representatives of "Die Heimat" in Lauchhammer, in the Oberspreewald-Lausitz district council and other councils.

== History ==
On April 28, 2013, the regional association was founded by 44 members in Nauen. The AfD Brandenburg ran in the 2013 federal election and received 6.0 percent of the second votes. In May 2014, the party ran in the local elections in Brandenburg, where it won 3.9 percent of the second votes and a total of 39 mandates in district councils and city council assemblies.

In the state elections in September 2014, they entered the state parliament with 12.2 percent. The regional association has given itself a “caregiver” image. Particular attention was paid to the topics of border crime and the refugee problem. There was also an open attempt to get votes from the Left Party. The AfD was the only state association to have its election program translated into Russian. In the state elections, it received first and foremost votes from former small party voters (approx. 22 percent). Around 20,000 former voters of the Left party, around 18,000 former CDU voters, around 17,000 former FDP voters, around 12,000 former SPD voters and around 1,000 former Greens voters voted for the AfD. The party also received the votes of around 12,000 former non-voters. Men in particular voted for the AfD; Older people voted for the party below average. In December 2014, the regional association traveled almost entirely to observe the Pegida demonstrations in Dresden. At the state party conference in April 2015, the state association of Junge Alternative for Germany was recognized.

In mid-June 2020, the Brandenburg Office for the Protection of the Constitution classified the AfD state association as a suspected case because, according to the head of the Brandenburg Office for the Protection of the Constitution, Jörg Müller, there was “sufficiently important factual evidence to suggest” that the state association was making “efforts against the free-democratic basic order”. Brandenburg's Interior Minister Michael Stübgen said, The Brandenburg AfD is “shaped by the ideas of völkisch-nationalist Flügels“.

== Election results ==
State Parliament (Landtag)

State election, year	No. of overall votes	% of overall vote & ranking	No. of overall seats won	+/–
Brandenburg, 2014	119,989	12.2 (#4)	11 / 88	
Brandenburg, 2019	297,484	23.5 (#2)	23 / 88	▲12
Brandenburg, 2024	438,811	29.2 (#2)	30 / 88	▲7

=== Member of Landtag of Brandenburg ===
Image	Member	Note
	Hans-Christoph Berndt	Berndt is classified as right-wing extremist by the Brandenburg Office for the Protection of the Constitution.
	Dennis Hohloch	Hohloch is classified as right-wing extremist by the Brandenburg Office for the Protection of the Constitution.
	Felix Teichner	Member of Young Alternative
	Daniel Freiherr von Lützow	Convicted of tax evasion by the Potsdam district court in 2022
	Steffen Kubitzki	Direct mandate from district Spree-Neiße I
	Dominik Kaufner	

== See also ==
- AfD Saxony
- AfD Saxony-Anhalt
- AfD Thuringia
- New states of Germany
