= AfD Hamburg =

German political party branch

Afd Hamburg
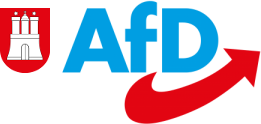
- Chairperson: Dirk Nockemann
- Founded: 7 April 2013; 13 years ago
- Membership (2020): 400
- Ideology: Right-wing populism
- Political position: Far-right
- National affiliation: Alternative for Germany
- Colours: Light blue
- Hamburg Parliament: 6 / 123
- Bundestag delegation: 78 / 736

Website
- afd-hamburg.de

The AfD Hamburg is the state association of the right-wing party Alternative for Germany (German: Alternative für Deutschland) in the German city Hamburg. The state association is led by politician Dirk Nockemann as state chairman. The party succeeded in entering Hamburg's parliament at their first attempt in the 2015 state election.

== AfD in the Hamburg Parliament ==
The state association was founded in April of 2013. Politician Jörn Kruse was elected as state chairman, Günther Siegert and Kay Gottschalk were elected as deputies, and Erich Marquart was elected as treasurer. As a result, some former members of the parties Die Freiheit and Partei Rechtsstaatlicher Offensive (Schill-Party) joined the state association, so that at the next state executive elections, among others, the former member of the Schill-Partei and former Senator of the Interior Dirk Nockemann was elected deputy chairman. Furthermore, Bernd Baumann was elected third deputy and the board was expanded from seven to nine members.

On May 25, 2014, the state party entered all seven assemblies for the first time in the elections to the district assemblies, with a total of 17 deputies.

In the 2015 state election, the state party received 6.1% of the vote, meaning that eight members on the list were elected as members of the Hamburg Parliament. According to the Statistics Office North, the AfD received over five percent of the constituency votes in 14 constituencies and became the fourth strongest party in five constituencies (constituencies 11, 12, 14, 15 and 17). It received the highest share of the vote in constituency 17, 9.3 percent, and the lowest in constituency 3, 2.8 percent.

In the 2020 Hamburg state elections, the AfD Hamburg received 5.3% of the vote, just surpassing the bare minimum the party needed to stay in parliament.

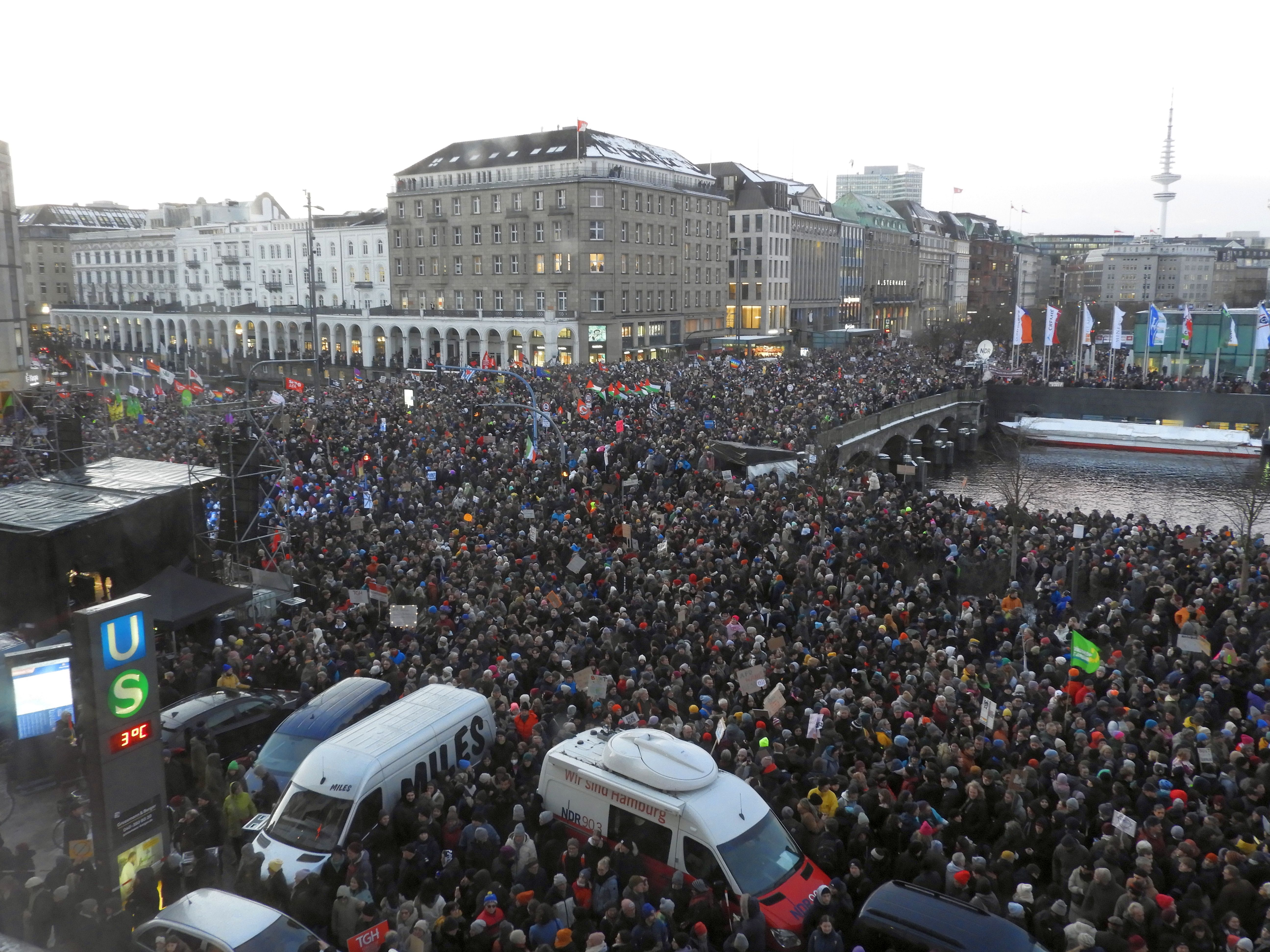
Demonstration in Hamburg against AfD on January 19th 2024

In January 2024 in Germany hundreds of thousands of people were protesting against AfD and Nazism. In Hamburg the local organizing committee wanted to rally at the central Hamburg City Hall. The AfD Fraction Hamburg then spontaneously called a parliamentary group meeting with which they wanted to make the demonstration more difficult because there was a ban mile around the City Hall during meetings. A spokeswoman for the DGB said: “The AfD is using the ban mile law to prevent protests against right-wing extremism on the Rathausmarkt.”

The demonstration was postponed and instead of 10,000 exspected people at least 50,000 were protesting against the AfD, the demonstration had to be stopped due to overcrowding.

=== National Executive Board ===
Since November 2021, the National Executive Board has been composed of the following members:

Position	Party member(s)
State Chairman	Dirk Nockemann (MdHB)
Deputy State Chairman	Alexander Wolf (MdHB), Krzysztof Walczak (MdHB), Joachim Körner
Treasurer	Peggy Heitmann
Deputy Treasurer	Peter Schierhorn
Secretary	Marc Cremer-Thursby
Assessors	Eckbert Sachse, Eugen Seiler

== Parliamentary group in the Hamburg Parliament ==
Members of the AfD in the Hamburg Parliament as of 2023:

- Dirk Nockemann (Parliamentary Group Chairman; State Chairman)
- Olga Petersen
- Thomas Reich
- Marco Schulz
- Krzysztof Walczak (Parliamentary Managing Director; Deputy State Chairman)
- Alexander Wolf

== Election results ==
Parliament of the Free and Hanseatic City of Hamburg (Bürgerschaft der Freien und Hansestadt Hamburg)

State election, year	No. of overall votes	% of overall vote & ranking	No. of overall seats won	+/–
Hamburg, 2015	214,833	6.1 (#6)	8 / 121	
Hamburg, 2020	214,596	5.3 (#5)	7 / 123	▼1
Hamburg, 2025	329,066	7.54 (#5)	10 / 123	▲3
