= Hannes Gnauck =

German politician (born 1991)

Hannes Gnauck MdB

Federal Chairman of the Young Alternative for Germany
- In office 15 October 2022 – 31 March 2025
- Preceded by: Carlo Clemens
- Succeeded by: Position abolished

Member of the Bundestag; from Brandenburg
- Incumbent
- Assumed office 26 October 2021
- Constituency: State list (2021–2025); Uckermark – Barnim I (2025–present)

Personal details
- Born: 8 August 1991 (age 35) Prenzlau, Germany
- Party: Alternative for Germany

Hannes Gnauck (born 8 August 1991) is a German politician of the party Alternative for Germany (AfD). He was the last federal chairman of the far-right youth organization of the AfD, Young Alternative for Germany (JA) and has been a member of the Bundestag since 2021.

Germany's Military Counterintelligence Service (MAD) classifies him as a "recognized extremist".

== Life and politics ==
Gnauck was born 1991 in Prenzlau. After graduating school with Mittlere Reife, he studied sport and fitness administration, working as a clerk for two years. Between 2014 and 2021, Gnauck was a soldier in the Bundeswehr.

The Bundeswehr's Military Counterintelligence Service (MAD) classifies him as a "recognized extremist". MAD investigates information about possible anti-constitutional efforts within the armed forces. After the MAD determined in 2020 that Gnauck is a right-wing extremist, the Bundeswehr law was applied to him. He is forbidden to wear the Bundeswehr uniform, he is forbidden from duty and he is only allowed to enter Bundeswehr facilities when he is asked to do so by the Bundeswehr.

In 2021, Hannes Gnauck was elected as the successor to Carlo Clemens as federal chairman of the far-right youth organization of AfD, JA. Gnauck would hold that office until the party was dissolved in 2025.

Gnauck was elected to MP of Bundestag in 2021. There he represents the AfD in the Bundestag defense committee. Politicians from other parties criticize sharply that an extremist, investigated by German Intelligent Service is part of the state defence committee.

In fact, Hannes Gnauck infiltrated an activist of the far-right »Identitarian Movement« during a non-public Bundeswehr exercise. Prior to the Army's "multiplier day" at Munster Training Area on May 5, 2026, Gnauck registered Jannis George as his escort via the Bundestag's Defense Committee. The invitation was addressed to members of parliament, defence insiders, and scientists. Systems that the army intends to acquire were demonstrated on the training ground. Although there was a ban on film and photography, George posted several pictures on his Instagram account, which then caught the attention of the military intelligence service MAD.

George is well connected in the nationalist scene and works for a media agency, the AfD politician Ulrich Siegmund in Saxony-Anhalt. In the fall of 2025, George lost his permission card for the Bundestag due to security concerns, which he had for a job with an AfD MP.
