= Jean-Pascal Hohm =

German politician (born 1997)

Member of the Landtag of Brandenburg
- Incumbent
- Assumed office 17 October 2024
- Preceded by: Marianne Spring-Räumschüssel
- Constituency: Cottbus I

Leader of Generation Germany
- Incumbent
- Assumed office 29 November 2025
- Preceded by: Position established

Personal details
- Born: 1997 (age 28–29) Ludwigsfelde
- Party: Alternative for Germany (since 2014)

Jean-Pascal Hohm (born 1997 in Ludwigsfelde) is a German politician of the far-right party Alternative for Germany. He has been a member of the Brandenburg state parliament since 2024 and chairman of the AfD youth organization Generation Germany since November 29, 2025. He studied economics for a time but did not complete his degree.

== Politics ==
Hohm has been a member of the German far-right political party Alternative for Germany (AfD) since 2014. Between 2014 and 2016, he headed the now banned Young Alternative for Germany in Brandenburg, from August 2015 onward as part of a dual leadership with Dennis Hohloch. In 2019, he temporarily withdrew from party positions and resigned from his job with Bundestag member René Springer, citing personal reasons. Since April 2021, Hohm has been the AfD's district chair in Cottbus, where domestic intelligence reports describe him as closely connected to right-wing extremist and in parts neo-Nazi networks.

During the COVID-19 pandemic, he took part in protests against protective measures. At an event in December 2021, where Hohm acted as assembly leader, he placed a Black bloc of masked right-wing extremists at the front of the demonstration and personally led it. Because he had called for two unregistered protests, Cottbus police filed charges against Hohm in January 2022 for violating the Assembly Act.

In the 2024 Brandenburg state election, he was elected to the state parliament for the Cottbus I constituency via a direct mandate.

The AfD party leadership favored Hohm as the federal chair of its new youth organization, Generation Germany. On 29 November 2025, he was elected chair of Generation Deutschland. He advocated for greater discipline within the party’s youth wing. He does not consider membership in the Identitarian movement to be grounds for exclusion from the youth organization.

=== Ties to the Identitarian Movement and the AfD’s Radical Fringe ===
In 2016, Hohm took part in a sit-in by the ethnonationalist Identitarian movement in front of the headquarters of the German political party Christian Democratic Union of Germany in Berlin. He repeatedly showed himself in selfies wearing Identitarian t-shirts.

In 2017, he had to give up a job with the AfD's state parliamentary group after appearing at a soccer match together with a group of masked Cottbus hooligans and a then-regional leader of the Identitarian movement. During the match, riots broke out and some Cottbus fans shouted antisemitic slogans.

In a Facebook post of the same year, Hohm described himself as part of a movement made up of European far-right movement Pegida, the Identitarian movement, and the AfD.

According to his own statements, Hohm is a supporting member of the New Right initiative Ein Prozent, which serves as a funding source for the Identitarian movement. In 2017, Hohm completed an internship with Ein Prozent. In 2018, Hohm met in Rome with an Identitarian activist and members of the Italian neo-fascist organization Casa Pound. In 2025, Hohm took part in a networking meeting organized by the far-right publishing house Jungeuropa; its operator, Philip Stein, is also a co-founder of Ein Prozent. In addition to several other AfD politicians, multiple politicians of the National Democratic Party of Germany, numerous Identitarian movement members, and several neo-Nazis from banned groups were present.

Hohm denies having been active within the Identitarian movement, but stresses that he considers "what they do absolutely legitimate." He also said that what Martin Sellner "built with the Identitarian movement" was "a life's work," stating that Sellner had made "the issue of migration reversal, remigration, known across Europe." Although Hohm emphasized that the demand for "remigration" does not, for him, apply to people with German citizenship, he has said on other occasions that the AfD is the "party of Germans" and “also of autochthonous Germans," which T-Online described as a "party for Germans without migrational background - for so-called 'bio-Germans' with white skin."

=== Other Positions ===
In August 2017, Hohm shared a video on Twitter from the militant neo-Nazi band Hassgesang, in which he reportedly covered up the in Germany banned SS runes visible in the original, according to the Federal Office for the Protection of the Constitution.

Hohm has claimed that there is a "population replacement" taking place in Germany, and resistance is a must. According to Hohm, cities are being "flooded with millions of culturally alien people" who behave like conquerors. He has urged young people to practice martial arts and "become capable of self-defense."

Hohm states that he is a member of the German anti-refugee association Zukunft Heimat (Future Homeland) and has also spoken at its protest. According to the Office for the Protection of the Constitution, Hohm has also shown "programmatic closeness" to several right-wing fraternities.

Hohm is classified as right-wing extremist by Brandenburg Office for the Protection of the Constitution. Statements by Hohm are used by the Federal Office for the Protection of the Constitution as evidence of an ethnically-based concept of "the people" within the AfD.

Hohm's closeness to right-wing rap is, according to Die Welt, "undisputed." In 2019, he praised a concert by the right-wing rappers Komplott and Bloody 32 in an article for the New Right magazine Arcadi: "Hundreds of young Germans" had demonstrated their will "to continue the fight for homeland, freedom, and tradition." In 2025, Hohm shared a song by the far-right and partially violence-oriented rap crew Neuer Deutscher Standard.
