= Hans-Christoph Berndt =

German politician (born 1956)

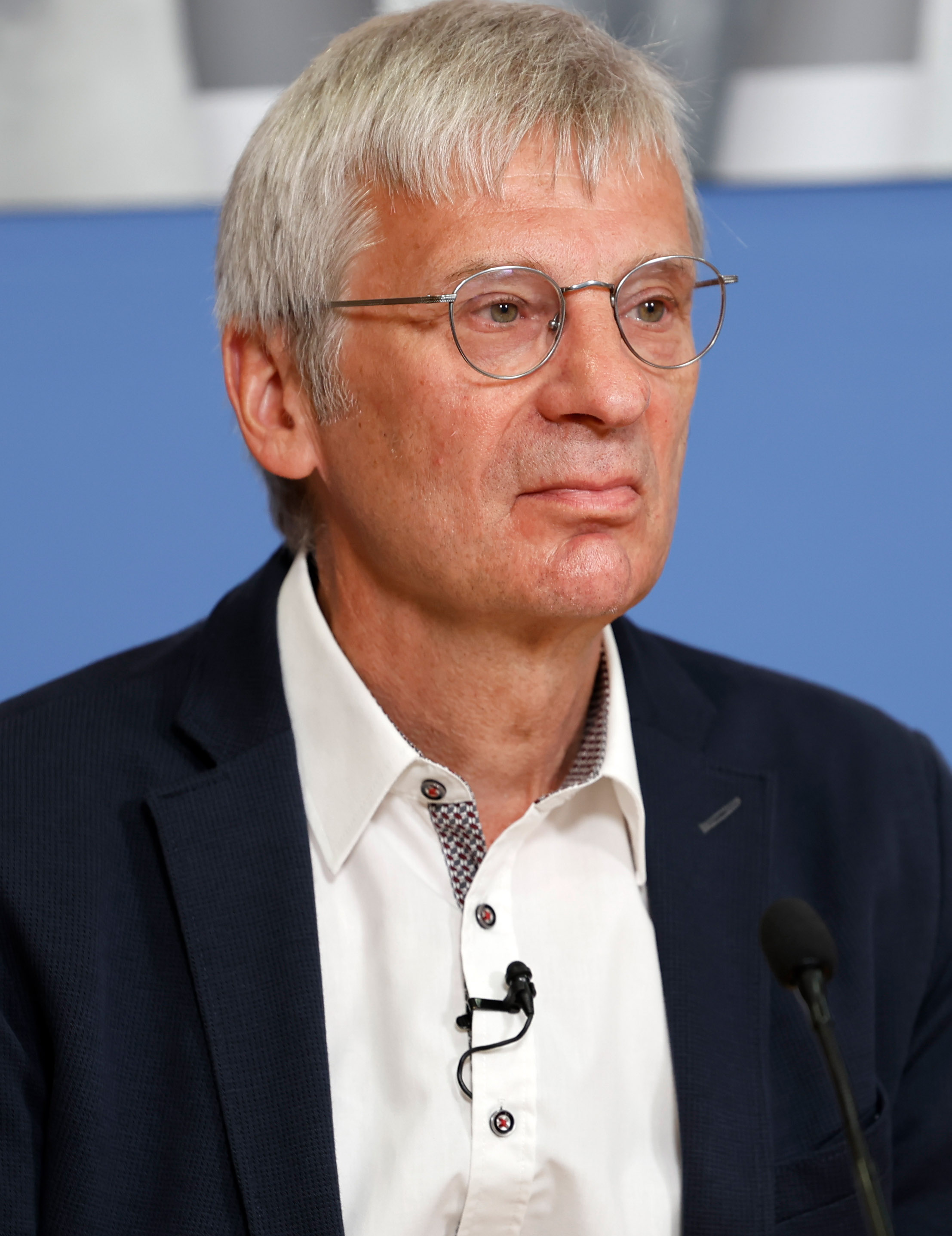
Berndt in 2023

Hans-Christoph Berndt (born 1956 in Bernau bei Berlin) is a German politician. Since October 2020, he has been the leader of the Alternative for Germany parliamentary group in the Landtag of Brandenburg and, in this capacity, also the opposition leader in the state parliament. Berndt is classified as right-wing extremist by the Brandenburg Office for the Protection of the Constitution. He was AfD's lead candidate for the 2024 Brandenburg state election.

== Life ==
Berndt grew up in East Berlin in Prenzlauer Berg and graduated from high school in 1975. He then spent a year visiting the course for ancient Greek and Latin at the Priesterseminar Erfurt in Schöneiche. From 1976 to 1977 he worked as a mechanic. Two years later he began studying dentistry. After graduating in 1984, he completed specialist training as a dentist in pathobiochemistry until 1989. He later earned his doctorate on the transport of dopamine in the brain of rats.

He worked as a clinical pathologist at the Berlin Charité from the mid-1980s, where he was chairman of the staff council of the medical faculty for about ten years. After his activities as spokesman for the right-wing extremist association Zukunft Heimat, which is active in Brandenburg, became known, the hospital distanced itself and announced: "The Charité advocates a cosmopolitan and tolerant society. As a university hospital with employees from 77 nations, it stands for social responsibility, helpfulness and tolerance". In 2016, he did not run for chairman again, but continued to be a member of the staff council.

Berndt lives in Golßen-Sagritz in the Dahme-Spreewald district. He is married and Roman Catholic.

== Political career ==
=== Party and MP ===
In 2018, Berndt joined the Alternative for Germany. In the election of the top candidate for the 2019 Brandenburg state election, he was elected to second place on the state list, just behind Andreas Kalbitz. He has been a member of the city council in Golßen since 2019. In the state elections in September 2019, he won the direct mandate in Constituency 28 (Dahme-Spreewald III) with 28.9 percent of the first votes and entered the Landtag of Brandenburg as a directly elected representative. As a simultaneous member of the state parliament and the city council, he holds a dual mandate.

On 27 October 2020, he was elected as the parliamentary leader of the Brandenburg AfD parliamentary group, succeeding Andreas Kalbitz. He was confirmed in this position in March 2022.

Although he never signed the Erfurt Resolution and was therefore not formally counted among the inner circle of Flügel members, he is counted within the party as a supporter of the ethnic-nationalist group Der Flügel, which formally dissolved itself in the spring of 2020 and whose leaders also included his predecessor Andreas Kalbitz.

At the 10th state party conference in April 2024, he was elected as the top candidate for the state elections in September 2024 with 87% of the vote. He has also become deputy state chairman.

In the 2024 Brandenburg state election, Berndt was re-elected in his constituency of Dahme-Spreewald III. The AfD was narrowly beaten for first place by the SPD.

=== Association Future Homeland ===
Berndt is co-founder and one of the two chairmen of the anti-refugee association Zukunft Heimat, founded in 2015, which organizes events and demonstrations in Cottbus and the surrounding area. he association from Golßen, with around 100 members, is classified by the Brandenburg Office for the Protection of the Constitution as "proven right-wing extremist" and " influenced by neo-Nazis".

=== Network ===
Berndt is considered a networker and has connections to various organizations of the German New Right (Neuen Rechten) such as One Percent for Our Country, the Institute for State Policy and the right-wing extremist magazine Compact by Jürgen Elsässer, ll of which are monitored by the Federal Office for the Protection of the Constitution. He has appeared several times as a speaker at Pegida demonstrations in Dresden.

== Controversial positions and classification ==
At a demonstration in January 2016, Berndt made the statement: "What woman can still move freely when a group of dark-haired, young men appears or could appear in the distance?".

According to Spiege, Berndt is considered a right-wing extremist by the Brandenburg Office for the Protection of the Constitution.

In early May 2020, a few weeks after the start of the COVID-19 pandemic in Germany, Berndt publicly asked at a demonstration whether "anyone has died of Corona at all". Berndt rejected the wearing of mouth and nose protection to prevent infection as a "symbol of oppression".

On 30 October 2020, during a special session in the Landtag of Brandenburg, he stated that he "does not believe in Corona either" and called himself a "Corona heretic". Even in December 2020, when the number of new infections in Brandenburg, Germany and worldwide had risen dramatically, he continued to claim that there was no excess mortality.

In January 2024, he defended the discussion on remigration that was said to have taken place at a meeting of right-wing extremists in Potsdam in 2023. It was "not a secret plan, but a promise".

== Publications ==
- Investigations on posthypoxic dopamine transport in the rat striatum - Berlin 1990 (dissertation at the Humboldt University).
