= Uckermark – Barnim I =

Federal electoral district of Germany

57 Uckermark – Barnim I
- Electoral district for the Bundestag
- Uckermark – Barnim I in 2025
- State: Brandenburg
- Population: 220,600 (2019)
- Electorate: 182,836 (2021)
- Major settlements: Eberswalde; Schwedt; Wandlitz
- Area: 4,251.6 km^{2}

Current electoral district
- Created: 1990
- Party: AfD
- Member: Hannes Gnauck
- Elected: 2025

Uckermark – Barnim I is an electoral constituency (German: Wahlkreis) represented in the Bundestag. It elects one member via first-past-the-post voting. Under the current constituency numbering system, it is designated as constituency 57. It is located in northeastern Brandenburg, comprising the Uckermark district and most of the Barnim district.

Uckermark – Barnim I was created for the inaugural 1990 federal election after German reunification. From 2021 to 2025, it was represented by Stefan Zierke of the Social Democratic Party (SPD). Since 2025 it has been represented by Hannes Gnauck of the AfD.

== Geography ==
Uckermark – Barnim I is located in northeastern Brandenburg. As of the 2021 federal election, it comprises the district of Uckermark and the district of Barnim excluding the municipalities of Ahrensfelde, Bernau bei Berlin, Panketal, and Werneuchen.

== History ==
Uckermark – Barnim I was created after German reunification in 1990, then known as Prenzlau – Angermünde – Schwedt – Templin – Gransee. It acquired its current name in the 2002 election. In the 1990 through 1998 elections, it was constituency 272 in the numbering system. In the 2002 and 2005 elections, it was number 57. In the 2009 election, it was number 58. Since the 2013 election, it has been number 57.

Originally, the constituency comprised the independent city of Schwedt and the districts of Prenzlau, Angermünde, Templin, and Gransee. It acquired its current configuration in the 2002 election, as Schwedt, Angermünde, Prenzlau, and Templin were merged into the Uckermark district. It lost Gransee while acquiring the northern part of the new Barnim district, as well as the entirety of the Amt of Groß Schönebeck. Upon the abolition of Amt Groß Schönebeck ahead of the 2005 election, the municipality of Marienwerder and the former municipality of Zerpenschleuse were transferred out of the constituency. In the 2013 election, it gained the municipality of Wandlitz and the Amt of Biesenthal-Barnim.

Election	No.	Name	Borders
1990	272	Prenzlau – Angermünde – Schwedt – Templin – Gransee	Schwedt city; Prenzlau district; Angermünde district; Templin district; Gransee district
1994	272	Prenzlau – Angermünde – Schwedt – Templin – Gransee	Schwedt city; Prenzlau district; Angermünde district; Templin district; Gransee district
1998	272	Prenzlau – Angermünde – Schwedt – Templin – Gransee	Schwedt city; Prenzlau district; Angermünde district; Templin district; Gransee district
2002	57	Uckermark – Barnim I	Uckermark district; Barnim district (excluding Ahrensfelde, Bernau bei Berlin, Panketal, Wandlitz, and Werneuchen municipalities and Biesenthal-Barnim Amt)
2005	57	Uckermark – Barnim I	Uckermark district; Barnim district (excluding Ahrensfelde, Bernau bei Berlin, Panketal, Wandlitz, and Werneuchen municipalities and Biesenthal-Barnim Amt)
2009	58	Uckermark – Barnim I	Uckermark district; Barnim district (excluding Ahrensfelde, Bernau bei Berlin, Panketal, Wandlitz, and Werneuchen municipalities and Biesenthal-Barnim Amt)
2013	57	Uckermark – Barnim I	Uckermark district; Barnim district (excluding Ahrensfelde, Bernau bei Berlin, Panketal, and Werneuchen municipalities)
2017	57	Uckermark – Barnim I	Uckermark district; Barnim district (excluding Ahrensfelde, Bernau bei Berlin, Panketal, and Werneuchen municipalities)
2021	57	Uckermark – Barnim I	Uckermark district; Barnim district (excluding Ahrensfelde, Bernau bei Berlin, Panketal, and Werneuchen municipalities)
2025	57	Uckermark – Barnim I	Uckermark district; Barnim district (excluding Ahrensfelde, Bernau bei Berlin, Panketal, and Werneuchen municipalities)

== Members ==
The constituency was first represented by Markus Meckel of the Social Democratic Party (SPD) from 1990 to 2009. It was won by The Left in 2009, and represented by Sabine Stüber. In 2013, it was won by Jens Koeppen of the Christian Democratic Union (CDU). He was re-elected in 2017. Stefan Zierke regained it for the SPD in 2021.

Election	Member	Party	%
1990	Markus Meckel	SPD	37.7
1994	Markus Meckel	SPD	48.8
1998	Markus Meckel	SPD	54.0
2002	Markus Meckel	SPD	49.4
2005	Markus Meckel	SPD	39.6
2009	Sabine Stüber	LINKE	32.0
2013	Jens Koeppen	CDU	38.9
2017	Jens Koeppen	CDU	30.6
2021	Stefan Zierke	SPD	29.6
2025	Hannes Gnauck	AfD	38.3

== Election results ==
=== 2025 election ===
Federal election (2025): Uckermark – Barnim I
Notes:	Blue background denotes the winner of the electorate vote. Pink background denotes a candidate elected from their party list. Yellow background denotes an electorate win by a list member, or other incumbent. A ✓ or ✗ denotes status of any incumbent, win or lose respectively.						
Party	Candidate	Votes	%	±%	Party votes	%	±%
AfD	Hannes Gnauck	53,908	38.3	▲18.1	50,763	36.0	▲16.1
SPD	✗ Stefan Zierke	27,211	19.4	▼10.3	19,508	13.8	▼17.5
CDU	Ulrike Mauersberger	25,661	18.3	▲0.5	22,700	16.1	▲0.8
BSW					17,496	12.4	New
Left	Isabelle Czok-Alm	17,200	12.2	▲2.7	15,480	11.0	▼2.0
Greens	Michael Kellner	5,460	3.9	▼1.9	6,833	4.8	▼2.2
FW	Michael Stürmer	5,175	3.7	▲0.7	2,209	1.6	▼0.9
FDP	Mike Menzel	3,323	2.4	▼6.1	3,745	2.7	▼5.4
PARTEI	Andreas Wolk	2,641	1.9	▲0.3	1,302	0.9	▼0.3
Volt					695	0.5	▲0.3
BD					274	0.2	New
MLPD					83	0.1	0.0
Informal votes		1,533			1,024		
Total valid votes		140,579			141,088		
Turnout		142,112	78.9	▲7.3			
AfD gain from SPD	Majority	26,697	18.9	N/A			

=== 2021 election ===
Federal election (2021): Uckermark – Barnim I
Notes:	Blue background denotes the winner of the electorate vote. Pink background denotes a candidate elected from their party list. Yellow background denotes an electorate win by a list member, or other incumbent. A ✓ or ✗ denotes status of any incumbent, win or lose respectively.						
Party	Candidate	Votes	%	±%	Party votes	%	±%
SPD	Stefan Zierke	38,247	29.6	▲10.2	40,543	31.4	▲14.5
AfD	Hannes Gnauck	26,163	20.3	▲0.1	25,748	19.9	▼0.9
CDU	✗ Jens Koeppen	22,991	17.8	▼12.8	19,818	15.3	▼12.9
Left	Isabelle Czok-Alm	12,316	9.5	▼8.9	11,617	9.0	▼9.7
FDP	Friedhelm Boginski	10,964	8.5	▲4.7	10,422	8.1	▲2.6
Greens	Michael Kellner	7,528	5.8	▲2.1	9,095	7.0	▲3.0
FW	Jörg Arnold	3,811	3.0	▲1.1	3,131	2.4	▲1.2
Tierschutzpartei					2,830	2.2	▲0.8
dieBasis	Richard MacLean	2,090	1.6		1,911	1.5	
PARTEI	Niels Neudeck	2,071	1.6	▼0.1	1,517	1.2	0.0
Independent	Christoph Graf von Schlippenbach	1,436	1.1				
Unabhängige					576	0.4	
Pirates	Stefan Günther	786	0.6		516	0.4	
NPD					482	0.4	▼0.6
Team Todenhöfer					241	0.2	
ÖDP	Thomas Löb	412	0.3		233	0.2	0.0
Independent	Jürgen Buro	335	0.3				
Volt					196	0.2	
DKP					179	0.1	0.0
Humanists					131	0.1	
MLPD					60	0.0	0.0
Informal votes		1,815			1,719		
Total valid votes		129,150			129,246		
Turnout		130,965	71.6	▲1.3			
SPD gain from CDU	Majority	12,084	9.3				

=== 2017 election ===
Federal election (2017): Uckermark – Barnim I
Notes:	Blue background denotes the winner of the electorate vote. Pink background denotes a candidate elected from their party list. Yellow background denotes an electorate win by a list member, or other incumbent. A ✓ or ✗ denotes status of any incumbent, win or lose respectively.						
Party	Candidate	Votes	%	±%	Party votes	%	±%
CDU	✓ Jens Koeppen	39,102	30.6	▼7.6	36,160	28.2	▼8.0
AfD	Steffen John	25,804	20.2		26,605	20.8	▲15.7
SPD	Stefan Zierke	24,843	19.4	▼3.4	21,650	16.9	▼5.5
Left	Andreas Büttner	23,589	18.4	▼8.7	23,870	18.6	▼5.4
FDP	Laura Schieritz	4,859	3.8	▲2.3	7,021	5.5	▲3.4
Greens	Thomas Dyhr	4,714	3.7	▲0.7	5,187	4.1	▲0.2
FW		2,361	1.8	▲0.6	1,518	1.2	▲0.2
PARTEI		2,163	1.7		1,451	1.1	
Tierschutzpartei					1,744	1.4	
NPD					1,267	1.0	▼1.6
BGE					567	0.4	
DM					483	0.4	
DKP		441	0.3		230	0.2	
ÖDP					184	0.1	
MLPD					86	0.1	0.0
Informal votes		1,994			1,857		
Total valid votes		127,876			128,013		
Turnout		129,870	70.3	▲6.2			
CDU hold	Majority	13,298	10.4	▼2.5			

=== 2013 election ===
Federal election (2013): Uckermark – Barnim I
Notes:	Blue background denotes the winner of the electorate vote. Pink background denotes a candidate elected from their party list. Yellow background denotes an electorate win by a list member, or other incumbent. A ✓ or ✗ denotes status of any incumbent, win or lose respectively.						
Party	Candidate	Votes	%	±%	Party votes	%	±%
CDU	Jens Koeppen	38,394	38.9	▲13.0	36,377	36.8	▲12.9
Left	✗ Sabine Stüber	25,673	26.0	▼6.0	23,572	23.8	▼7.1
SPD	Stefan Zierke	23,235	23.5	▼3.5	22,475	22.7	▼3.3
AfD					4,776	4.8	
NPD	Aileen Rokohl	3,374	3.4	▼0.4	2,632	2.7	▼0.4
Greens	Sarah Polzer-Storek	2,825	2.9	▼1.4	3,580	3.6	▼1.0
Pirates	Jürgen Voigt	2,456	2.5		1,985	2.0	▲0.1
FDP	Martin Hoeck	1,565	1.6	▼4.7	2,069	2.1	▼5.6
FW	Wilfried Haase	1,233	1.2		877	0.9	
PRO					317	0.3	
REP					159	0.2	0.0
MLPD					100	0.1	0.0
Informal votes		1,879			1,715		
Total valid votes		98,755			98,919		
Turnout		100,634	62.8	▲0.3			
CDU gain from Left	Majority	12,721	12.9				

=== 2009 election ===
Federal election (2009): Uckermark – Barnim I
Notes:	Blue background denotes the winner of the electorate vote. Pink background denotes a candidate elected from their party list. Yellow background denotes an electorate win by a list member, or other incumbent. A ✓ or ✗ denotes status of any incumbent, win or lose respectively.						
Party	Candidate	Votes	%	±%	Party votes	%	±%
Left	Sabine Stüber	32,791	32.0	▲3.9	31,833	31.0	▲1.8
SPD	✗ Markus Meckel	27,674	27.0	▼12.6	26,761	26.0	▼10.2
CDU	Jens Koeppen	26,512	25.9	▲2.9	24,524	23.9	▲3.3
FDP	Walter Henke	6,396	6.2	▲2.8	7,907	7.7	▲2.3
Greens	Alice-Sarah Polzer-Storek	4,385	4.3	▲1.9	4,762	4.6	▲0.9
NPD	Mike Sandow	3,945	3.8	▲0.4	3,139	3.1	▼0.2
Pirates					1,960	1.9	
Independent	Susanne Münz	781	0.8				
DVU					745	0.7	
FWD					687	0.7	
REP					191	0.2	
BüSo					189	0.2	
MLPD					106	0.1	▼0.1
Informal votes		3,330			3,010		
Total valid votes		102,484			102,804		
Turnout		105,814	62.5	▼8.7			
Left gain from SPD	Majority	5,117	5.0				

=== 2005 election ===
Federal election (2005):Uckermark – Barnim I
Notes:	Blue background denotes the winner of the electorate vote. Pink background denotes a candidate elected from their party list. Yellow background denotes an electorate win by a list member, or other incumbent. A ✓ or ✗ denotes status of any incumbent, win or lose respectively.						
Party	Candidate	Votes	%	±%	Party votes	%	±%
SPD	✓ Markus Meckel	48,538	39.6	▼9.7	44,317	36.2	▼12.4
Left	Irene Wolff-Molorciuc	34,257	28.1	▲7.5	35,772	29.2	▲10.6
CDU	Jens Koeppen	28,104	23.0	▲1.7	25,204	20.6	0.0
NPD	Kerstin Michaelis	4,237	3.5		3,964	3.2	▲1.8
FDP	Heinz Gerdsen	4,174	3.4	▼1.7	6,585	5.4	▲0.3
Greens	Thomas Wesche	2,947	2.4	▲0.3	4,579	3.7	▲0.4
50Plus The Generation-Alliance					968	0.8	
GRAUEN					757	0.6	▲0.1
MLPD					229	0.2	
Informal votes		2,425			2,073		
Total valid votes		122,077			122,429		
Turnout		124,502	71.2	▲0.7			
SPD hold	Majority	14,101	11.5				
