= Zohra Mojadeddi =

German politician

Member of the Hamburg Parliament
- In office 2020–2025
- Constituency: State list

Personal details
- Born: 1969 (age 56–57) Afghanistan
- Party: Alliance 90/The Greens Hamburg
- Occupation: Politician

Zohra Mojadeddi (born 1969) is a German Greens politician who served as a member of the Hamburg Parliament from 2020 until 2025. Prior to her election, she worked as a management consultant specializing in financial services and served in the Wandsbek borough council.

== Biography ==
Mojadeddi was born in 1969 in Afghanistan. Her family became political prisoners when the People's Democratic Party of Afghanistan rose to power in the Soviet–Afghan War. Following her release, she fled the country with her brother and mother, eventually reaching Hamburg through Pakistan.

In 2000, Mojadeddi started working as a management consultant, with her clients financial services, private equity, and venture capital. She was a member of the Wandsbek borough council from 2019 to 2020, as well as chair of Alliance 90/The Greens Hamburg's building affairs subcommittee for Alstertal. She had been inspired to go into politics due to the rise of xenophobia in Germany.

Mojadeddi was elected to the Hamburg Parliament in the 2020 Hamburg state election through the Greens' state list. She was her party's spokesperson on economic policy. She chaired the Economic Affairs Committee, and she was part of the Budget and Petitions Committee and the Parliamentary Committee of Inquiry into the CumEx Tax Scandal. She opposed the Bundeswehr special fund amidst the 2022 Russian invasion of Ukraine, citing her experiences with the Soviet-Afghan war.

On 17 December 2024, during a debate on the city's budget, Mojadeddi told the Parliament that she felt obligated to "raise my voice for peace in Gaza and the West Bank and speak out against a war of annihilation", referring to the Gaza war. CDU parliamentary group leader Dennis Thering subsequently accused her of antisemitism, while AfD deputy Krzysztof Walczak pointed to Hamas' nature as the war's instigator. Greens parliamentary group chair Dominik Lorenzen distanced himself from her statements, saying it did not reflect the position of his group. Parliament president Carola Veit reprimanded her for going off-topic.

Mojadeddi was not re-elected to Parliament in the 2025 Hamburg state election.

Mojadeddi is married to Zaid el-Mogaddedi, founder of the Institute for Islamic Banking and Finance.
