= Roland Zwerenz =

German businessman

Roland Wilhelm Zwerenz
- Born: 1952 (age 73–74); Westgermany
- Occupation: Businessman
- Spouse: Beate Zwerenz

Roland Zwerenz is a German business men. Together with his wife Beate Zwerenz, he owns and manages the Zwerenz Group GmbH, based in Dresden. The corporate group comprises several trade fair and service companies, as well as the large event and exhibition venues in Gießen, Dresden and Halle (Saale).

In 2023, the group had a revenue of approximately 16 million euros and a profit of 2.4 million euros.

Zwerenz became known for consistently making his premises available to far-right parties, companies, and groups.

== Life ==
Roland Wilhelm Zwerenz was born in 1957 in Hungen, Hesse. He studied physics and holds a diploma in physics. In 1988, according to his own account, he started his own business in Gießen—initially on a part-time basis—under the name ORTEC GmbH, and organized his first small-scale specialized exhibitions there.

Shortly after the accession of the GDR to the FRG, he and his future wife, Beate Zwerenz, became active in Dresden, where they launched the construction trade fair "Haus" and, later, the education and job fair "KarriereStart."

In 1995, the couple took over the "Hessenhallen" in Gießen. He founded "Messe Giessen GmbH" and, among other initiatives, established the "BAUExpo"—which became the largest construction trade fair in Hesse.

Since 1999, "Halle Messe GmbH" has been part of his corporate group. In 2002, he built and opened the first entirely privately owned exhibition center in East Germany.

From 2014 onwards, he consolidated the companies under the umbrella of Zwerenz Group GmbH. This group also includes service companies such as CongressTeam Dresden GmbH, which specializes in exhibition construction, advertising, and event technology.

Roland Zwerenz as a board member of the "Bundesverband Deutscher Unternehmer in der Republik Polen e.V." (Federal Association of German Entrepreneurs in the Republic of Poland), an organization dedicated to establishing and expanding business ties. He is also board member of Bundesverband Floh-Trödel- und Sammlermärkte e. V., Gießen. He is board member of Mittelstandsunion in Dresden (Business association with ties to the CDU).

Roland Zwerenz hosted right-wing AfD and it's youth organization "Generation Deutschland" in Messe Gießen and a neurechte Book Fair in Halle Messe.

== Zwerenz Group ==
The group owns a number of subsidiaries:

- Messe Gießen GmbH
- Halle Messe GmbH
- Impuls Veranstaltungs GmbH, Halle
- Creatyp GmbH, Halle
- Ortec Messe und Kongress GmbH, Gießen
- MAE Systems GmbH, Dresden
- Congress Team Dresden GmbH
- M.A.T. Objekt GmbH, Dresden
