= Andreas Kalbitz =

German politician, member of the state parliament of Brandenburg

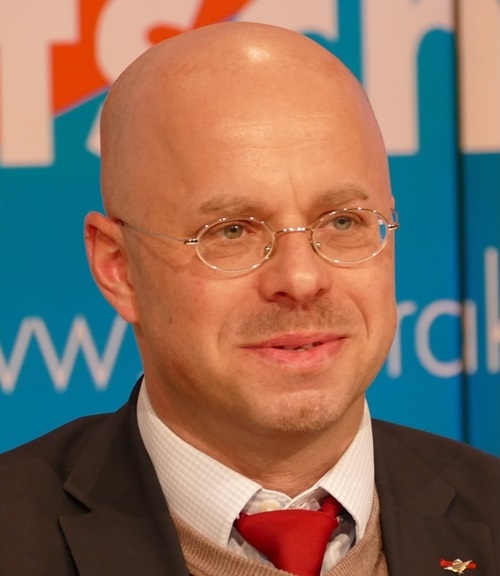
- Kalbitz in 2016

Leader of the Opposition in the Landtag of Brandenburg
- In office 25 September 2019 – 18 August 2020
- Preceded by: Ingo Senftleben
- Succeeded by: Hans-Christoph Berndt

Leader of the Alternative for Germany in Brandenburg
- In office 8 April 2017 – 15 May 2020 (Until July 2020 beside suspended membership)
- Preceded by: Alexander Gauland
- Succeeded by: Birgit Bessin

Leader of Alternative for Germany in the Landtag of Brandenburg
- In office 7 November 2017 – 15 May 2020 (Until 18 August 2020 beside suspended membership)
- Preceded by: Alexander Gauland
- Succeeded by: Vacant until 27 October 2020; Hans-Christoph Berndt

Member of the Landtag of Brandenburg
- Incumbent
- Assumed office 8 October 2014
- Constituency: State Wide Party List

Leader of Der Flügel
- In office 1 March 2015 – 15 May 2020
- Preceded by: Office wasn't established
- Succeeded by: Björn Höcke

Spokesperson of Der Flügel
- In office 1 March 2015 – 15 May 2020
- Preceded by: Office wasn't established
- Succeeded by: Björn Höcke

Personal details
- Born: Andreas Edwin Kalbitz; 17 November 1972 (age 53) Munich, Bavaria, West Germany
- Party: Independent (since 2020)
- Other political affiliations: Alternative for Germany (2013–2020)
- Children: 3
- Education: Brandenburg University of Applied Sciences (no degree)

Military service
- Allegiance: Germany
- Branch/service: Bundeswehr
- Years of service: 1994–2005
- Rank: Oberfeldwebel
- Unit: Army (Heer)

Andreas Kalbitz (born 17 November 1972) is a German politician and former member of the Alternative for Germany (AfD) party. He was a member of the party from 2013 until his expulsion in 2020. From 2017 to 2020, he served as chairman of the AfD Brandenburg faction of the party in the Landtag of Brandenburg, a state parliament.

== Life and politics ==
Kalbitz was born 1972 in Munich and became a paratrooper in the Bundeswehr, the German federal army from 1994 until 2005. His claims that in 2008 he had studied Informatik (computer science) proved false in 2017. Kalbitz was a member of various extremist right-wing organisations before he entered the newly founded AfD in 2013. One of those extremist right-wing organisations, a banned neo-Nazi group called German Youths Loyal to the Fatherland, became the reason he was expelled from the party as he allegedly declined to notify the party while joining in 2013.

In May 2020, Kalbitz was removed as Brandenburg Landtag chairman by the party leadership after he was accused of concealing ties to far-right extremist groups. He was succeeded by provisional leader Dennis Hohloch. Also in May, the AfD annulled the membership of Kalbitz, who in response vowed to "exhaust all legal options" to overrule the decision. In an interview the same month, co-spokesman of the AfD Jörg Meuthen emphasized that the decision had been made on legal rather than political grounds.

In August 2020, Kalbitz punched Hohloch while inside the Brandenburg parliament building, causing Hohloch to be admitted to hospital with internal injuries.

He has participated in Pegida rallies in the early 2020s alongside Björn Höcke among others, both before and after he was expelled from the AfD.
