= Friedhelm Boginski =

German politician (born 1955)

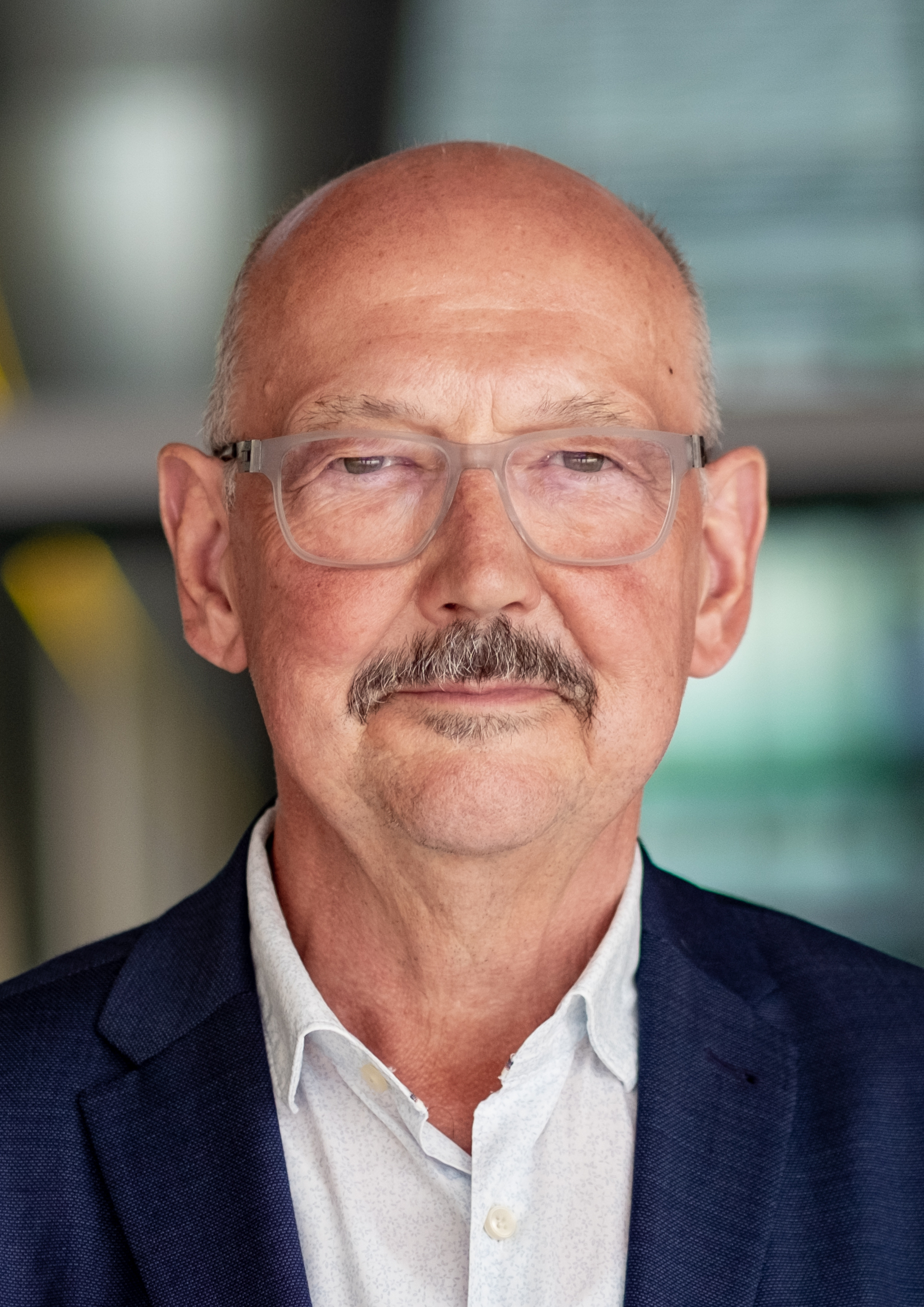
- Friedhelm Boginski, in 2022

Member of the Bundestag
- In office German Bundestag in 2021 – German Bundestag in 2025

Personal details
- Born: 7 November 1955 (age 70)
- Party: Free Democratic Party

Friedhelm Boginski (born 7 November 1955) is a German politician for the Free Democratic Party (FDP) who served as a member of the Bundestag from 2021 to 2025.

== Early life and career ==
Boginski was born 1955 in the West German city of Bremen and became a teacher.

== Political career ==
From 2006 to 2021, Boginski served as mayor of Eberswalde.

Boginski was elected to the Bundestag in 2021, representing the Uckermark – Barnim I district. In parliament, he served on the Committee on Education and Research.

In addition to his committee assignments, Boginski was part of the German-Portuguese Parliamentary Friendship Group.

== Other activities ==
- Federal Agency for Civic Education (BPB), Member of the Board of Trustees (since 2022)
