= Damian Lohr =

German politician (born 1993)

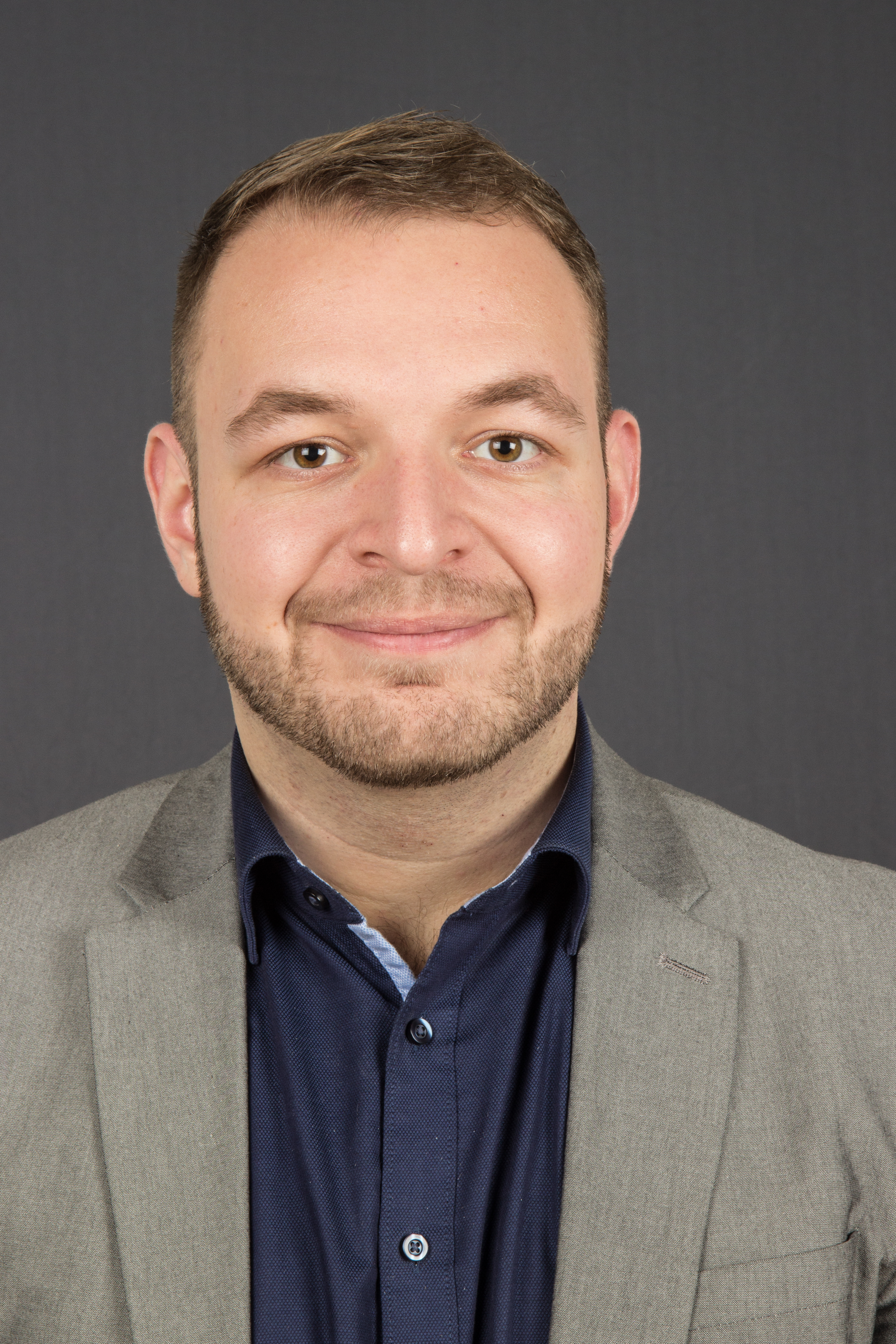
- Lohr in 2016

Member of the Landtag of Rhineland-Palatinate
- Incumbent
- Assumed office 18 May 2016

Personal details
- Born: 7 December 1993 (age 32) Mainz
- Party: Alternative for Germany (since 2013)

Damian Lohr (born 7 December 1993 in Mainz) is a German politician serving as a member of the Landtag of Rhineland-Palatinate since 2016. From 2018 to 2021, he served as chairman of the Young Alternative for Germany.
