= Michael Kellner =

German politician (born 1977)

Michael Kellner MdB
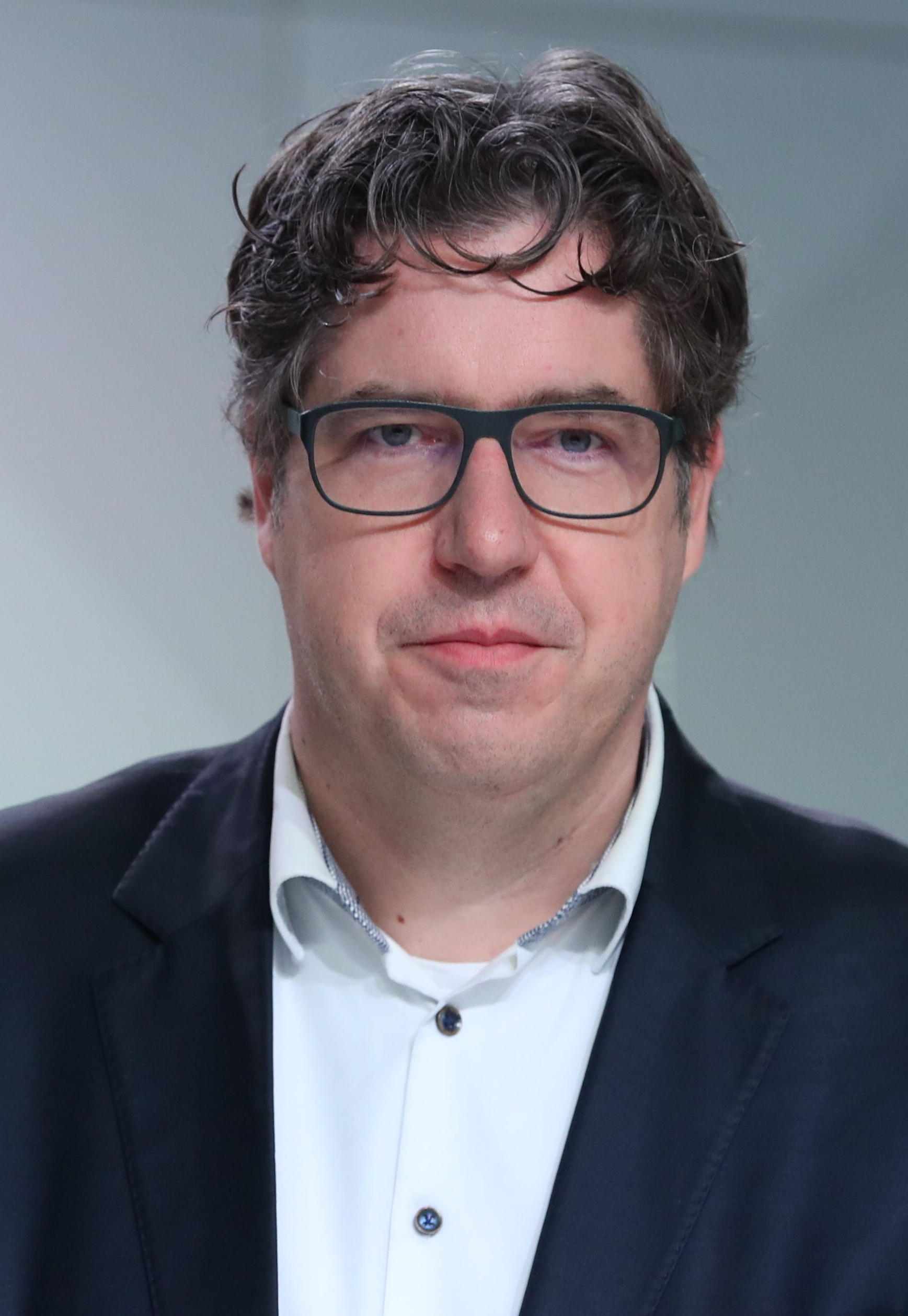
- Kellner in 2021

Parliamentary State Secretary for Economic Affairs and Climate Action
- In office 8 December 2021 – 6 May 2025 Serving with: Franziska Brantner; Oliver Krischer
- Chancellor: Olaf Scholz
- Minister: Robert Habeck
- Preceded by: Marco Wanderwitz; Elisabeth Winkelmeier-Becker; Thomas Bareiß

Member of the Bundestag for Uckermark – Barnim I
- Incumbent
- Assumed office 26 September 2021
- Preceded by: Sabine Stüber

Chief Executive of the Alliance '90/The Greens
- In office 19 October 2013 – 2022
- Leader: Annalena Baerbock; Robert Habeck
- Preceded by: Steffi Lemke
- Succeeded by: Emily Büning

Personal details
- Born: 8 May 1977 (age 49) Gera, East Germany
- Party: Alliance 90/The Greens
- Children: 2
- Education: University of Potsdam; University of Kent; Michigan State University
- Occupation: Politician
- Website: michael-kellner.info

Michael Kellner (born 8 May 1977) is a German politician (Alliance 90/The Greens) who has been serving as a Member of the Bundestag representing electoral constituency Uckermark – Barnim I since 2021.

In addition to his parliamentary work, Kellner served as Parliamentary State Secretary at the Federal Ministry for Economic Affairs and Climate Action in the coalition government of Chancellor Olaf Scholz from 2021 to 2025. In this capacity, he was also the Commissioner for Small and Medium-Sized Enterprises.

== Early life and education ==
Kellner grew up in his hometown of Gera in East Germany, the son of a school principal and a polyclinic. Both parents lost their jobs after the fall of the GDR. After graduating from school, Kellner lived and worked briefly on an Israeli kibbutz. He then studied political science at the University of Potsdam from 1996 to 2002, as well as in Canterbury as an Erasmus scholarship holder and at Michigan State University, as a Fulbright scholar. In his thesis, he dealt with the relationship between the states of Berlin and Brandenburg.

== Career ==
Kellner joined Alliance 90/The Greens in 1997.

From 2004 to 2009, Kellner worked as chief of staff to Claudia Roth in her capacity as member of the Green Party's national leadership. He subsequently became a legislative advisor to Frithjof Schmidt.

From 2013 to 2022, Kellner was his party's General Secretary. Following his switch into a government position, he was replaced in the role during a party convention in January 2022 by Emily Büning.

== Other activities ==
- Helmholtz Association of German Research Centres, Ex-Officio Member of the Senate (since 2022)
- Heinrich Böll Foundation, Member of the Supervisory Board

== Controversy ==
In early 2022, Kellner became one of the six subjects of an embezzlement investigation launched by the Berlin public prosecutor's office into the entire leadership board of the Green Party over the payment of so-called ‘corona bonuses,’ which had been paid in 2020 to all employees of the party's federal office and at the same time to its board.

== Personal life ==
Kellner is married to Verena Graichen, who has been serving as deputy chair of the German Federation for the Environment and Nature Conservation (BUND) since 2019. They have two children and live in Berlin and Oberuckersee.
