= Dahme-Spreewald III =

State electoral district of Germany

28: Dahme-Spreewald III
- Electoral district for the Landtag of Brandenburg
- Dahme-Spreewald III in 2024
- District: Dahme-Spreewald
- Electorate: 62,919 (2024)
- Major settlements: Lübben

Current electoral district
- Created: 1994
- Party: AfD
- Member: Hans-Christoph Berndt

Dahme-Spreewald III is an electoral constituency (German: Wahlkreis) represented in the Landtag of Brandenburg. It elects one member via first-past-the-post voting. Under the constituency numbering system, it is designated as constituency 28. It is located in within the district of Dahme-Spreewald.

== Geography ==
The constituency includes the town of Lübben, as well as the communities Heideblick, Heidesee, and Märkische Heide, and the districts of Lieberose/Oberspreewald, Schenkenländchen, and Unterspreewald.

There were 62,919 eligible voters in 2024.

== Members ==
Election	Member	Party	%
2004	Karin Weber	PDS	28.9
2009	Sylvia Lehmann	SPD	27.5
2014	Sylvia Lehmann	SPD	37.2
2019	Hans-Christoph Berndt	AfD	28.9
2024	Hans-Christoph Berndt	AfD	39.3

== Election results ==
=== 2024 election ===
State election (2024): Dahme-Spreewald III
Notes:	Blue background denotes the winner of the electorate vote. Pink background denotes a candidate elected from their party list. Yellow background denotes an electorate win by a list member, or other incumbent. A ✓ or ✗ denotes status of any incumbent, win or lose respectively.						
Party	Candidate	Votes	%	±%	Party votes	%	±%
AfD	✓ Dr. Hans-Christoph Berndt	15,346	39.3	▲10.3	13,904	35.4	▲6.6
SPD	Nadine Graßmel	13,022	33.3	▲7.6	11,646	29.7	▲3.0
BSW					4,987	12.7	
CDU	Drews	4,992	12.8	▼4.7	4,167	10.6	▼5.2
BVB/FW	Haase	2,237	5.7	▼2.2	1,068	2.7	▼2.3
Left	Merkes	1,158	3.0	▼6.1	749	1.9	▼6.5
DLW	Kilka	863	2.2		371	0.9	
Greens	Raschke	673	1.7	▼5.6	926	2.4	▼5.0
APT					696	1.8	▼0.8
Plus	Jonneck	466	1.2		262	0.7	▼0.5
FDP	Renatus	329	0.8	▼2.8	250	0.6	▼3.4
Values					112	0.3	
Third Way					102	0.3	
DKP					25	0.1	
Informal votes		566			387		
Total valid votes		39,086			39,265		
Turnout		39,652	75.3	▲10.1			
AfD hold	Majority	2,324	6.0	▲2.8			

=== 2019 election ===
State election (2019): Dahme-Spreewald III
Notes:	Blue background denotes the winner of the electorate vote. Pink background denotes a candidate elected from their party list. Yellow background denotes an electorate win by a list member, or other incumbent. A ✓ or ✗ denotes status of any incumbent, win or lose respectively.						
Party	Candidate	Votes	%	±%	Party votes	%	±%
AfD	Dr. Hans-Christoph Berndt	9,930	28.9		9,897	28.8	▲16.5
SPD	Sascha Philipp	8,828	25.7	▼11.5	9,169	26.7	▼9.0
CDU	Olaf Schulze	5,993	17.5	▼11.1	5,436	15.8	▼8.9
Left	Monika Christiane von der Lippe	3,105	9.0	▼6.9	2,887	8.4	▼5.9
BVB/FW	Björn Langner	2,737	8.0	▼3.3	1,734	5.0	▲2.4
Greens	Benjamin Raschke	2,502	7.3	▲2.8	2,527	7.3	▲3.5
FDP	Fabian Jahoda	1,239	3.6	▲1.2	1,402	4.1	▲2.4
Tierschutzpartei					887	2.6	
Pirates					204	0.6	▼0.6
ÖDP					184	0.5	
V-Partei3					64	0.2	
Informal votes		580			523		
Total valid votes		34,334			34,391		
Turnout		34,914	65.2	▲11.6			
AfD gain from SPD	Majority	1,002	3.2				

=== 2014 election ===
State election (2014): Dahme-Spreewald III
Notes:	Blue background denotes the winner of the electorate vote. Pink background denotes a candidate elected from their party list. Yellow background denotes an electorate win by a list member, or other incumbent. A ✓ or ✗ denotes status of any incumbent, win or lose respectively.						
Party	Candidate	Votes	%	±%	Party votes	%	±%
SPD	✓ Sylvia Lehmann	10,514	37.2	▲9.6	10,207	35.7	▲2.4
CDU	Olaf Schulze	8,089	28.6	▲1.5	7,047	24.7	▲2.2
Left	Dr. Adolf Deutschländer	4,497	15.9	▼9.5	4,096	14.3	▼10.3
AfD					3,526	12.3	
BVB/FW	Ralf Miethe	3,203	11.3	▲10.2	738	2.6	▲1.1
Greens	Andreas Rieger	1,283	4.5	▲0.8	1,089	3.8	▲0.1
NPD					875	3.1	▼0.5
FDP	Rico Kerstan	685	2.4	▼3.6	476	1.7	▼5.3
Pirates					357	1.2	
REP					110	0.4	▲0.2
DKP					57	0.2	▲0.1
Informal votes		871			564		
Total valid votes		28,271			28,578		
Turnout		29,142	53.6	▼15.7			
SPD hold	Majority	2,425	8.6	▲8.1			

=== 2009 election ===
State election (2009): Dahme-Spreewald III
Notes:	Blue background denotes the winner of the electorate vote. Pink background denotes a candidate elected from their party list. Yellow background denotes an electorate win by a list member, or other incumbent. A ✓ or ✗ denotes status of any incumbent, win or lose respectively.						
Party	Candidate	Votes	%	±%	Party votes	%	±%
SPD	Sylvia Lehmann	10,387	27.6	▲0.8	12,617	33.3	▲1.3
CDU	Johanna Wanka	10,192	27.1	▲3.4	8,499	22.5	▲1.2
Left	✗ Karin Weber	9,574	25.4	▼3.5	9,312	24.6	▼1.1
FDP	Hans-Ulrich Urspruch	2,272	6.0	▲1.7	2,666	7.0	▲3.5
Independent	Frank Selbitz	1,951	5.2				
NPD	Lutz Reichel	1,455	3.9		1,363	3.6	
Greens	Andreas Rieger	1,376	3.7	▲1.2	1,387	3.7	▲1.5
BVB/FW	Horst Pfeiffer	414	1.1		558	1.5	
Die-Volksinitiative					548	1.4	
DVU					380	1.	▼6.4
RRP					234	0.6	
50Plus					146	0.4	▼0.4
REP					89	0.2	
DKP					46	0.1	▼0.1
Informal votes		1,408			1,184		
Total valid votes		37,621			37,845		
Turnout		39,029	69.3	▲10.0			
SPD gain from PDS	Majority	195	0.5				

=== 2004 election ===
State election (2004): Dahme-Spreewald III
Notes:	Blue background denotes the winner of the electorate vote. Pink background denotes a candidate elected from their party list. Yellow background denotes an electorate win by a list member, or other incumbent. A ✓ or ✗ denotes status of any incumbent, win or lose respectively.						
Party	Candidate	Votes	%	±%	Party votes	%	±%
PDS	Karin Weber	9,514	28.93		8,537	25.72	
SPD	Sylvia Lehmann	8,804	26.77		10,635	32.04	
CDU	Johanna Wanka	7,779	23.65		7,077	21.32	
DVU					2,472	7.45	
AfW (Free Voters)	Detlef Roggan	2,149	6.53		787	2.37	
Independent	Heiko Terno	2,063	6.27				
FDP	Oliver Höhno	1,430	4.35		1,172	3.53	
Familie					884	2.66	
Greens	Wolfgang Renner	815	2.48		729	2.20	
50Plus					263	0.79	
Gray Panthers					189	0.57	
AUB-Brandenburg					120	0.36	
BRB					120	0.36	
Yes Brandenburg					117	0.35	
DKP					50	0.15	
Schill	Siegfried Pschowski	334	1.02		46	0.14	
Informal votes		1,111			801		
Total valid votes		32,888			33,198		
Turnout		33,999	59.29				
PDS win new seat	Majority	710	2.16				

== See also ==
- Politics of Brandenburg
- Landtag of Brandenburg
