= Sven Tritschler =

German politician (born 1981)

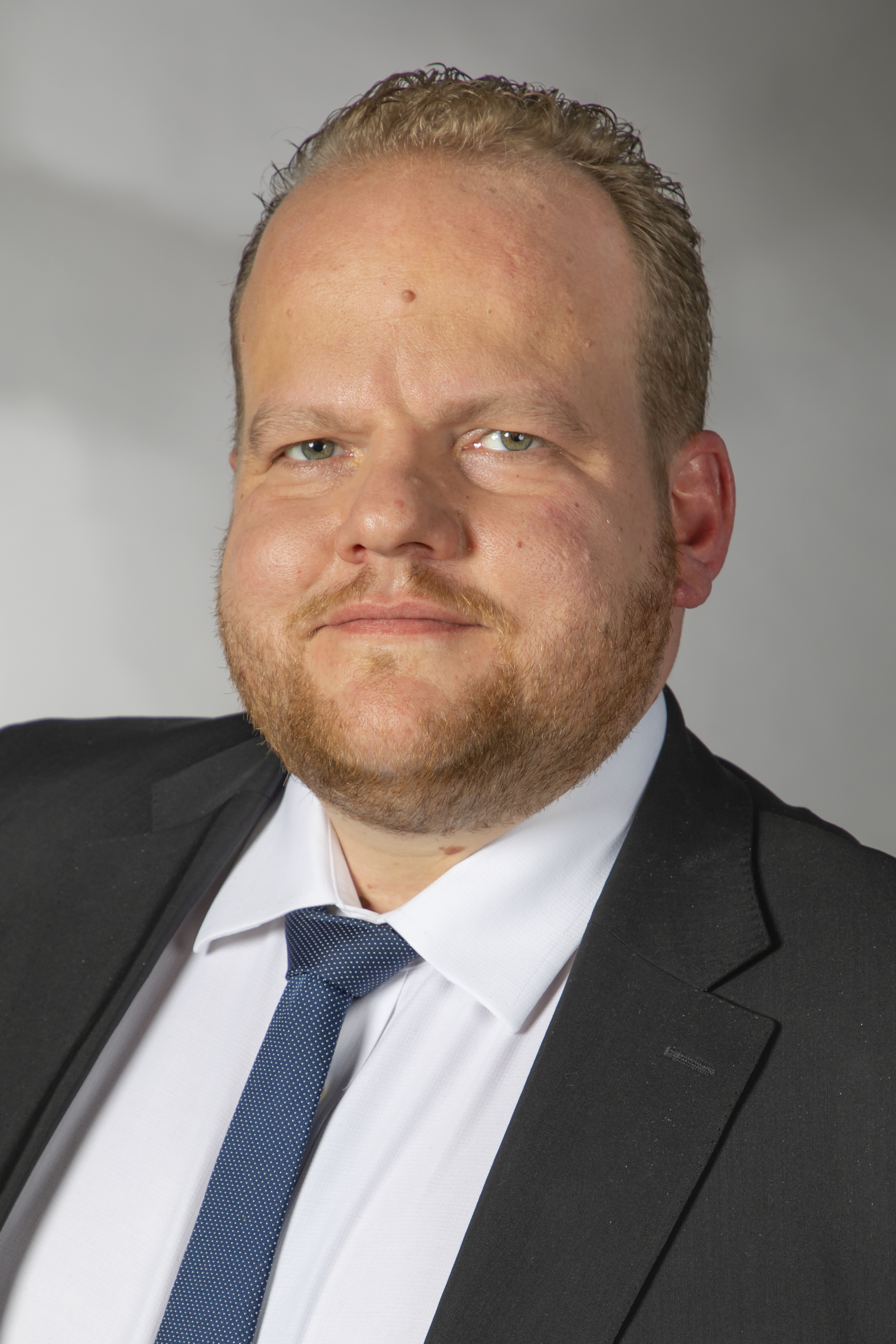
- Tritschler in 2019

Member of the Landtag of North Rhine-Westphalia
- Incumbent
- Assumed office 1 June 2017

Personal details
- Born: 23 November 1981 (age 44) Waldkirch
- Party: Alternative for Germany (since 2013)

Sven Werner Tritschler (born 23 November 1981 in Waldkirch) is a German politician serving as a member of the Landtag of North Rhine-Westphalia since 2017. From 2015 to 2018, he served as chairman of the Young Alternative for Germany.

== Personal life ==
Tritschler is gay but has stated that he is "not committed to LGBTI politics" and is "against gender ideology". He has faced criticism for these statements. He was a national liberal during his time in the FDP, but currently he get's described as libertarian.
