= Stefan Zierke =

German politician

Stefan Zierke MdB
- Zierke in 2020

Member of the Bundestag; from Brandenburg
- Incumbent
- Assumed office 22 October 2013
- Constituency: State list (2013–2021); Uckermark – Barnim I (2021–2025); State list (2025–present)

Personal details
- Born: 5 December 1970 (age 55) Prenzlau, East Germany
- Party: Social Democratic
- Children: 2

Stefan Zierke (born 5 December 1970) is a German politician of the Social Democratic Party (SPD) who has been serving as a member of the Bundestag from the state of Brandenburg since 2013.

== Political career ==
Zierke became a member of the Bundestag in the 2013 German federal election, representing the Uckermark – Barnim I district. In parliament, he was a member of the Committee on Tourism and the Committee on Transport and Digital Infrastructure from 2013 until 2017.

From 2018 until 2021, Zierke served as Parliamentary State Secretary at the Federal Ministry of Family Affairs, Senior Citizens, Women and Youth under successive ministers Franziska Giffey and Christine Lambrecht in the government of Chancellor Angela Merkel.

Since the 2021 elections, Zierke has been serving as his parliamentary group’s spokesperson for tourism.

== Other activities ==
- Business Forum of the Social Democratic Party of Germany, Member of the Political Advisory Board
- Federal Foundation for the Reappraisal of the SED Dictatorship, Member of the Board of Trustees
- Kurt Schumacher Society, Member of the Board
