= Jens Koeppen =

German politician (born 1962)

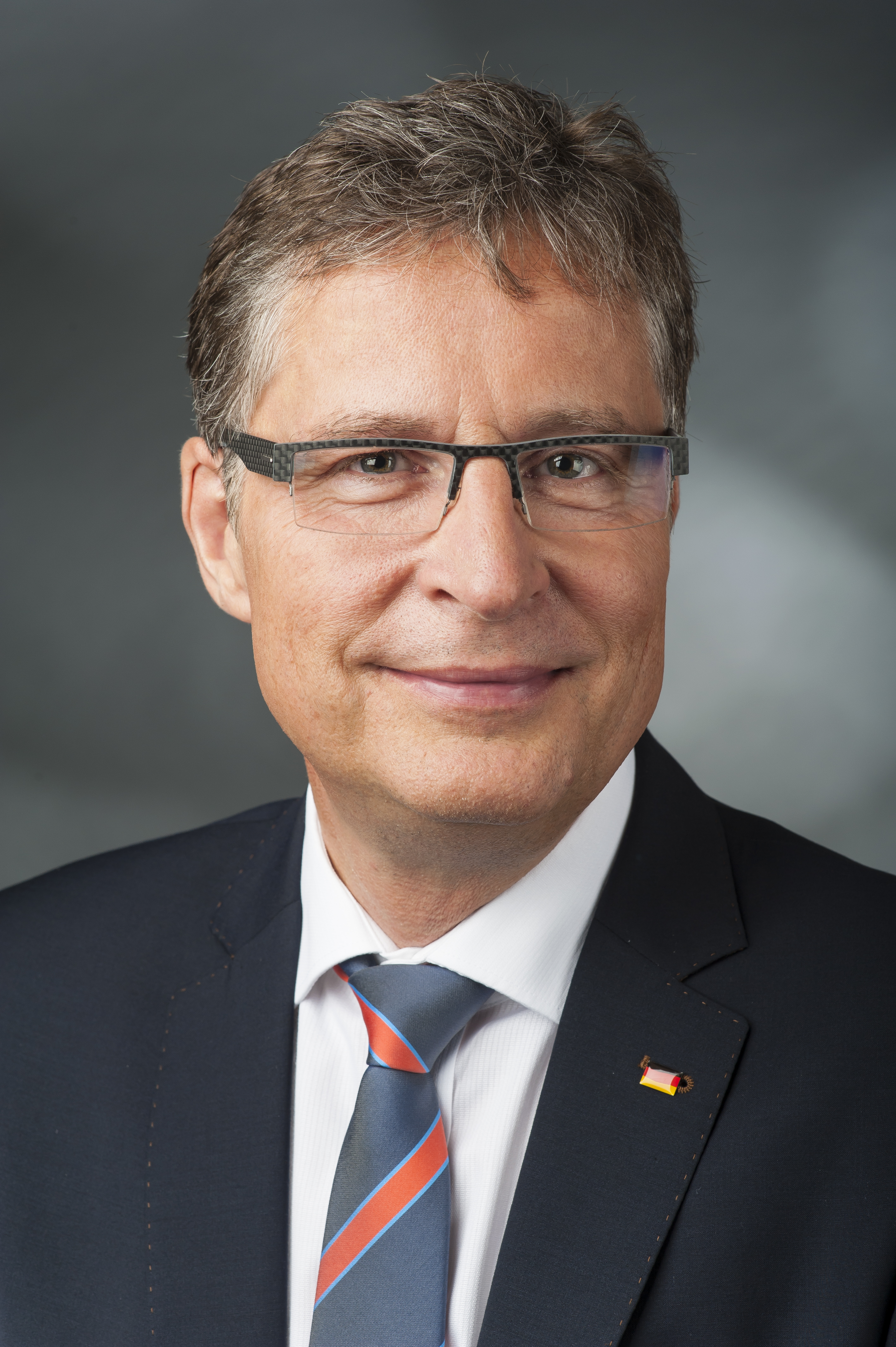
- Koeppen in 2014

Member of the Bundestag; from Brandenburg
- In office 18 October 2005 – 25 March 2025
- Constituency: State list (2005–2013); Uckermark – Barnim I (2013–2021); State list (2021–2025)

Personal details
- Born: 27 September 1962 (age 63) Zeitz, East Germany
- Party: Christian Democratic Union
- Other political affiliations: New Forum (1989–1990)
- Children: 1

Jens Koeppen (born 27 September 1962) is a German politician of the Christian Democratic Union who served as a member of the Bundestag from 2005 to 2025.

== Early life and education ==
Koeppen has lived in Schwedt since 1963.

== Political career ==
Koeppen became politically active in 1989, when he joined the East German political movement Neues Forum. In 1997, he joined the CDU.

From 18 September 2005, Koeppen has been a member of the German Bundestag, representing Uckermark – Barnim I. Between 2005 and 2013, he served as a member of the Committee on the Environment, Nature Conservation and Nuclear Safety. In 2009, Koeppen joined Andreas Scheuer in initiating a cross-party group for the protection of antique cars.

Following the 2013 federal elections, Koeppen moved to the Committee on Economic Affairs and Energy. In addition, he served as chairman of the Committee on the Digital Agenda from 2014 until 2017. He also serves as a member of the parliament's Council of Elders, which – among other duties – determines daily legislative agenda items and assigns committee chairpersons based on party representation.

In addition to his committee assignments, Koeppen was a member of the German-Hungarian Parliamentary Friendship Group and the Berlin-Taipei Parliamentary Circle of Friends.

In the negotiations to form a coalition government under the leadership of Chancellor Angela Merkel following the 2017 federal elections, Koeppen was part of the working group on digital policy, led Helge Braun, Dorothee Bär and Lars Klingbeil. He is leading his party's campaign for the 2021 federal elections in Brandenburg.

In August 2024, Koeppen announced that he would not seek re-election in the 2025 federal election.

== Other activities ==
- Federal Network Agency for Electricity, Gas, Telecommunications, Post and Railway (BNetzA), Member of the Advisory Board
- Rotary International, Member

== Political positions ==
In June 2017, Koeppen voted against Germany's introduction of same-sex marriage. Ahead of the Christian Democrats' leadership election in 2018, he publicly endorsed Friedrich Merz to succeed Angela Merkel as the party's chair.
