= Young Alternative for Germany =

Youth wing of Alternative for Germany (2013–2025)

Young Alternative for Germany Junge Alternative für Deutschland
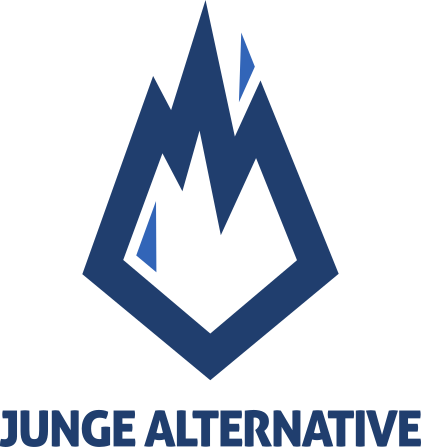
- Logo from 2019 to 2025
- Chairperson: Hannes Gnauck
- Founded: 15 June 2013
- Dissolved: 31 March 2025
- Succeeded by: Generation Germany
- Headquarters: Berlin
- Membership: c. 2,500 (March 2024)
- Ideology: Right-wing populism National conservatism Euroscepticism; Völkisch nationalism Antifeminism
- Position: Far-right
- Mother party: None, formerly the AfD (2015–2025)
- Website: www.jungealternative.net

The Young Alternative for Germany (German: Junge Alternative für Deutschland or JA) was a far-right youth organization in Germany. Founded in June 2013 and dissolved in March 2025, it was made for people aged 14 to 35 years. The JA was the de facto youth wing of the Alternative for Germany (AfD) party until it was officially recognized as such in November 2015. The JA continued to be the official youth wing of the AfD until January 2025, when AfD leadership voted to replace it, as it had been categorized as extremist by the Federal Office for the Protection of the Constitution (BfV) since 2023.

Its last chairman was Hannes Gnauck.

== History ==
The JA was founded on 15 June 2013, four months after the AfD, with Torsten Heinrich as the organisation's first chairperson. Heinrich left the party in March 2014.

In view of the JA's independence, it has been regarded by the AfD hierarchy as being somewhat wayward, with the JA repeatedly accused of being "too far right", politically regressive and anti-feminist among the German media.

In March 2014, the Junge Alternative hosted Nigel Farage who had been invited to address the party's North Rhine-Westphalia organisation in Cologne. The invitation is alleged to have caused some trouble within the AfD itself over the youth wing's unauthorised invitation of Farage, with the regional association and the youth wing wanting to stress their independence. The invitation was contrary to a decision of the AfD National Executive whose policy is that official contact with foreign parties is decided only by the federal executive. Nigel Farage's presence apparently led to a deterioration in relations with Bernd Lucke, the then-AfD leader, who called the move a "sign of poor political tact".

The JA launched an anti-feminist campaign entitled "Gleichberechtigung statt Gleichmacherei" (variously translated as "equal rights, not levelling down" or "equality instead of uniformity") on Facebook in response to the Young Socialists in the SPD, which posted photos supportive of feminism to mark International Women's Day. The Facebook page of JA describes feminism as a "left-wing ideology", and asks people to post reasons to reject it. The campaign was in reaction to proposals for gender quotas. Sections of the German media labelled election campaign material of the JA which showed attractive women in swimwear under the slogan "equality instead of uniformity" as in bad taste. The JA followed with a poster of four shirtless men under the slogan "end soft justice".

In May 2014, the JA is said to have further irritated AfD bosses with a statement they released on Facebook advocating vigilante action against crime.

In January 2015, the JA adopted its first statute, establishing basic organisational processes, and applied to become the official youth wing of the national party; the application was refused. In February 2015, Lucke proposed to dissolve the JA and found a new youth organisation. In May 2015, a JA convention removed sitting chair Philipp Meyer from office. Meyer, an ally of AfD leader Bernd Lucke, was a part of JA's liberal wing and was said to have acted against the JA board's wishes by publicly supporting expulsion proceedings against Björn Höcke. Meyer was replaced by Markus Frohnmaier, a member of JA's hardline right and an ally of Höcke. After Lucke himself was replaced as AfD leader in July 2015, the national party became more right wing; at the next party conference in November 2015, the JA was recognised as the national party's official youth organisation.

By 2016, the JA reported that it had over 800 members across 16 regional organisations. At the time, the JA was the official youth party of AfD state parties in North Rhine-Westphalia, Saarland, Hamburg, Baden-Württemberg, Bavaria, Rhineland-Palatinate, and Berlin.

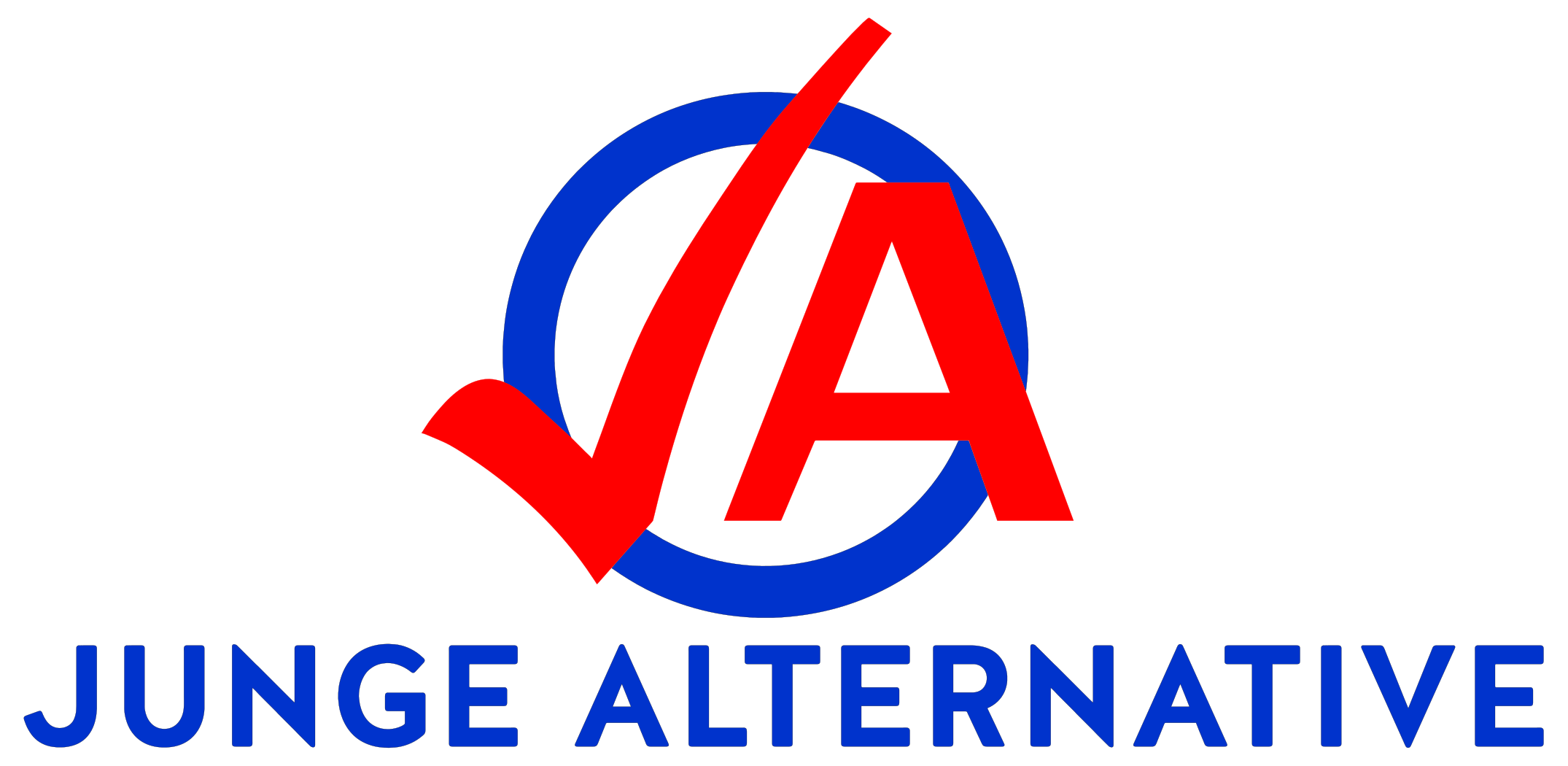
Logo until 2019

Marvin Neumann and Carlo Clemens were elected as JA's co-chairs on 18 April 2021. Less than three weeks later, Neumann resigned after pressure from AfD leaders over racist and white supremacist social media posts which the party feared would lead to the group being designated an extremist organisation.

A 2021 report from the US State Department said that the Bavarian Office for the Protection of the Constitution was monitoring the JA.

Since 2023, the JA has been classified as a right-wing extremist organisation by the German national intelligence service Federal Office for the Protection of the Constitution (BfV) after being a case of suspicion and an object of observation since 2019.

In December 2024, the main party of the AfD announced its intention to cut ties with the JA in connection to its classification by the Federal Office for the Protection of the Constitution. AfD leadership are planning to found a new organisation as its youth wing. On 12 January 2025, AfD leadership voted to formally replace the JA as its youth organisation. In February 2025, the JA voted to dissolve as an independent organization at a federal congress, with effect from 31 March 2025.

== Political positions ==
The social scientist Alexander Häusler sees the JA as a proponent of a right-wing populist direction that acts as a "bridgehead" of the party to the New Right. Like other youth organizations, it attempts to escalate the position of the parent party. According to the social scientist David Bebnowski (Göttingen Institute for Democracy Research), the youth organization presents itself as an "anti-feminist force". Contrary to the resolution at the 2016 national congress, there are repeated collaborations with the far-right Identitarian Movement at the local level.

According to researcher Anna-Lena Herkenhoff, members of the Junge Alternative "repeatedly stand out due to public statements that are astoundingly compatible with extreme right-wing discourse". The sociologist alludes to statements by Markus Frohnmaier and Robert Wasiliew, that exemplify how "the Junge Alternative uses a common right-wing, racist discourse" and follows a "public relations strategy typical of the extreme right". Whether the Junge Alternative also "has affinities with right-wing populist or extreme right-wing positions as an association as a whole" however, is still a "research desideratum" for sociologist Martin Langebach.

According to Häusler, the Junge Alternative is "more offensive than the parent party" in its efforts to "establish contacts with other right-wing populist parties in Europe". In 2014, for example, the JA organized a controversial event within the party with Nigel Farage, the leader of the British UK Independence Party. Moreover, Frohnmaier and Tritschler had also "sought direct contact with the FPÖ earlier than the leading functionaries of their parent party [...]" and now also maintained contacts with the Young SVP, the Finns Party Youth and the Young Guard of United Russia.

In the summer of 2014, the JA advertised frontier justice as "the new police" in a campaign on Facebook.

In May 2019, David Eckert, Chairman of JA Berlin, criticized the parent party's denial of climate change: the AfD should "distance itself from the [near incomprehensible] statement that humans do not influence the climate". As a result, several members of the state executive committee resigned, leaving the committee unable to continue working.

In 2022, the Young Alternatives supported a resolution calling for Germany to acquire nuclear weapons.

== Federal chairpeople ==
- June 2013–February 2014: Torsten Heinrich
- February 2014–January 2015: Philipp Ritz, resigned from JA
- January–April 2015: Philipp Meyer
- May 2015–February 2018: Sven Tritschler and Markus Frohnmaier
- February 2018–April 2021: Damian Lohr
- April 2021 – October 2022: Marvin Neumann (resigned May 2021) and Carlo Clemens
- October 2022 – March 2025: Hannes Gnauck

Political scientist Anna-Sophie Heinze has described Heinrich, Ritz, Meyer, Tritschler and Clemens as being from the moderate wing of the organisation and Frohnmaier, Lohr, Neumann and Gnauck as from the radical wing.

== Literature ==
- Herkenhoff, AL. (2016): Rechter Nachwuchs für die AfD – die Junge Alternative (JA). In: Häusler, A. (eds) Die Alternative für Deutschland. Springer VS, Wiesbaden. https://doi.org/10.1007/978-3-658-10638-6_14
- Raabe, L. (2018): Diskursstrategien in Online-Teilöffentlichkeiten am Beispiel der Jungen Alternative für Deutschland. In: Oswald, M., Johann, M. (eds) Strategische Politische Kommunikation im digitalen Wandel. Springer VS, Wiesbaden. https://doi.org/10.1007

== See also ==
- Sweden Democratic Youth (1993–2015)
- Finns Party Youth (2006–2020)
- Der Flügel – former faction of the AfD
