= David Eckert =

German politician (born 1991)

Member of the Berlin House of Representatives
- Incumbent
- Assumed office 29 October 2026

Personal details
- Born: 1991 (age 34–35)
- Party: Alternative for Germany

David Christopher Eckert (born 1997) is a German politician who was elected member of the Berlin House of Representatives in 2026. He has served as chairman of the Alternative for Germany in Lichtenberg since 2025. From 2017 to 2019, he served as chairman of the Young Alternative for Germany in Berlin.
