= Generation Germany =

Youth wing of the party Alternative for Germany (AfD)

Generation Germany Generation Deutschland
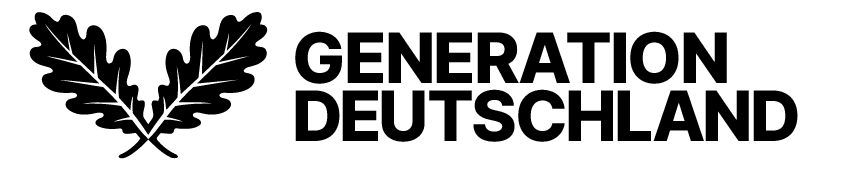
- Leader: Jean-Pascal Hohm
- Deputy Leader: Jan Richard Behr; Adrian Maxhuni; Patrick Heinz
- Treasurer: Lennard Scharpe
- Founded: 29 November 2025
- Preceded by: Young Alternative for Germany
- Membership: 2,410 (as of February 2026)
- Ideology: Völkisch nationalism
- Position: Far-right
- Colours: Black, White, Blue
- Mother party: Alternative for Germany
- Website: generationdeutschland.de

Generation Germany (German: Generation Deutschland) is the youth organization of the far-right political party, Alternative for Germany (AfD). It was founded on 29 November 2025 in Giessen. The predecessor organization, Young Alternative for Germany (JA), dissolved itself on 31 March 2025 after it had been classified as right-wing extremist by the Federal Office for the Protection of the Constitution.

== History ==
In January 2025, at its party conference in Riesa, the AfD dissolved its youth organization, the Young Alternative for Germany (JA). The organization had been classified as a confirmed right-wing extremist group by the Federal Office for the Protection of the Constitution since 2023. At the same time, the establishment of a new youth wing, more closely integrated with the party, was proposed; at that time, it was still called the "Patriotic Youth." According to the AfD leadership, the reform was intended to provide greater enforcement powers, for example, in cases of misconduct. In February, the JA decided to dissolve itself on March 31, citing, among other things, a potentially imminent ban on the association as a reason. During the 2020s it became more common for young conservatives to support hard-right and far right parties such as the AfD.

=== Formation in November 2025 ===
The new youth organization of the AfD was founded on November 29, 2025, in Gießen at the Hessenhallen. Approximately 2,000 founding members are expected. The name and logo still need to be agreed upon at the founding meeting, but according to party circles, the name Generation Germany is considered a done deal. Twenty-six organizations and individuals were officially invited and are therefore permitted to set up an information booth. These include the magazine Sezession and the Jungeuropa Verlag, both of which are classified as far right by the Federal Office for the Protection of the Constitution.

The JA was an independent association separate from the parent party, whereas Generation Germany is to be directly subordinated to the party as a "legally dependent sub-organization". According to its current statutes, the purpose of Generation Germany is defined as the dissemination of the AfD party program and ideology. Organizational or "other loyalty ties" to other organizations are to be prohibited. According to political scientist Reiner Becker, the AfD leadership is attempting to gain more control over its youth organization through the new structure. Becker believes this is intended to prevent scandals before the 2026 elections in Saxony-Anhalt and Mecklenburg-Western Pomerania, where the AfD hopes to achieve victories.

Counter-protests are expected against the planned new organization. Projections for the number of participants in the demonstrations range from 10,000 to over 50,000 people. The protests are being called for by, among others, the "Widersetzen" alliance, which had already organized blockades and demonstrations at the AfD party conferences in Riesa and Essen. An alliance of parties ranging from Die Linke to the FDP, representatives of religious communities and social organizations also called for demonstrations; in addition, there will be a pro democracy gathering in front of the town hall. According to the spokeswoman for Widersetzen, bus arrivals from all over Germany and mass blockades of the access roads to the conference venue are planned.

== Members ==
The organization is intended for 14- to 36-year-olds; unlike the previous JA, simultaneous membership in the AfD will be required. The AfD had surveyed all party members under 36 years of age about their interest in joining a new youth organization by October 2025; reportedly, over 1,500 responded.

Approximately two months before its founding, the "youth coordinators" of the AfD's state executive committees created a coordinated list of the designated members of the 15-member federal executive committee of the youth organization. The former head of the Brandenburg JA, Jean-Pascal Hohm, who is classified as far-right by the Brandenburg state office for the protection of the constitution, is considered the future federal chairman of Generation Germany. Hohm is to be supported by three deputies; Jan Richard Behr and Adrian Maxhuni are among those proposed. The third candidate is to come from the AfD North Rhine-Westphalia state association, which, however, could not agree on a single individual. Many of the future leaders have close ties to far-right front organizations of the AfD. Based on the candidate list, Der Spiegel assumes that Generation Germany will be even more radical than the Young Alternative (JA).
