= Völkisch nationalism =

German nationalist ideology

Völkisch nationalism (German: Völkischer Nationalismus [ˈfœlkɪʃɐ natsi̯onaˈlɪsmʊs], lit. 'Folkish nationalism') is a German far-right, ultranationalist, ethno-nationalist, and/or racial nationalist ideology. It assumes the essentialist concept of Völker (lit. "peoples") or Volksgruppen (lit. "ethnic groups"), which are described as closed ethnic-biological and ethnic-cultural units within a hierarchy of such populations. Völkisch nationalism influenced Japanese minzoku nationalism.

At times, Völkisch nationalism was a broad and predominant ideological view in Central Europe, represented in numerous nationalist, typically explicitly antisemitic and other racist associations of all kinds with many publications and well-known personalities. It differentiates itself from the Völkisch movement by being a more vague and not inherently antisemitic ideology. In the 21st century, particularly in Germany, ethnopluralism is viewed as standing in the same tradition as Völkisch nationalism.

== History ==
=== 1871–1945 ===
Towards the end of the 19th century, the movement gained influence over the political and cultural debate in Central Europe. Its historical significance was found in its own nationalism, especially in the German Reich. The Völkisch movement, to which the German national associations such as the DNVP and the NSDAP belonged.

The NSDAP – whose party organ was the Völkischer Beobachter – rejected the Weimar Constitution and represented Völkische Gemeinschaftlichkeitskonzepte (lit. "ethnic [German] concepts of community"). The biological and cultural homogeneity of the "Volk" as a "Abstammungsgemeinschaft" (lit. "community of descent") and the "exclusion or destruction of the heterogeneous" were invoked. Völkische (lit. "nation", "ethnic") concepts such as "Volkstum", "Lebensraum" and above all "Volksgemeinschaft" were widespread in large parts of the German population and especially within the "Fatherland Camp", thus an integral part of the Nazi programming. German Protestantism is considered to be its social support and its "necessary ideal condition". From an ideological perspective, the "bourgeois-Protestant mentality" has become increasingly German-Völkisch since the Reichsgründung (lit. "Establishment of the Reich"). A nationally charged Protestantism of the Reich thus led to the Nazi concept of the German Christians.

=== 1945–present ===
From the postwar era to the early 21st century, Völkisch nationalism was rejected by the mainstream German political circles. With the rise of national conservatism, right-wing populism, Völkisch nationalism and the Neue Rechte during the 2010s and as of the 2020s, young conservatives became more likely to support far-right and hard-right parties such as the Alternative for Germany (AfD). The AfD particularly became successful among the region of East Germany within the states that were a part of the German Democratic Republic. The Völkisch faction of the AfD is largely led by those such as Björn Höcke, Andreas Kalbitz, André Poggenburg, Jan Wenzel Schmidt and Jean-Pascal Hohm.

== Characteristics ==
Völkisch nationalism means the rise of their own Volks defined by common descent, culture and language, and the desire for a homogeneous population by excluding foreigners. The people become a collective subject. It forms a hierarchical value of the Völker.

German social scientist Helmut Kellershohn calls seven core elements of a Völkisch nationalism:

1. The equality of "Volk" or "nation". The idea of a homogeneous "nation" according to racist criteria.
2. The rise of the "Volk" to a collective subject in the sense of ethnic groups and the subordination of specific interests under the primacy of the "Volksgemeinschaft".
3. The justification of a "strong state" that organizes the Volksgemeinschaft through "national" elites and/or charismatic leadership.
4. The heroization of the "decent Volksgenosse" who puts himself in the service of his community with body and soul and brings for these sacrifices.
5. the Völkisch (lit. "national") or racist construction of an "internal (state) enemy" responsible for setbacks in the realization of the Volksgemeinschaft, has an identity-building and consensus-building function as a negative projection area for the Volksgemeinschaft.
6. A biopolitical understanding of the Volkskörper (lit. "national body") that wants to keep or make it healthy and strong through population policy.
7. A chauvinistic idea of power.

== Völkisch nationalist groups ==
=== Current ===
- Alternative for Germany
- Die Heimat/The Homeland
- Freedom Party of Austria
- Generation Germany
- National Democratic Party of Germany (2023)

=== Defunct ===
- Der Stahlhelm, Bund der Frontsoldaten
- Freikorps
- German Fatherland Party
- German National People's Party
- German Socialist Party
- German Völkisch Freedom Party
- German Völkisch Party
- German Workers' Party
- Greater German People's Community
- Greater German People's Party (Austria)
- National Democratic Party (Austria)
- National Socialist Freedom Movement
- National Socialist German Workers' Party
- Patriotic Europeans Against the Islamisation of the West
- Volksdeutsche Bewegung (Luxembourg)

== See also ==
- An Investigation of Global Policy with the Yamato Race as Nucleus (Japan)
- Antisemitism in Europe#Germany
- Atsızism (Turkey)
- Blood and soil
- German question
- Han nationalism / Han chauvinism (China)
- Neo-fascism / Neo-Nazism
- Palingenetic ultranationalism
- Pan-Germanism
- Unification of Germany
- White nationalism / White supremacy
