= Alexander Wolf (politician) =

German politician (born 1967)

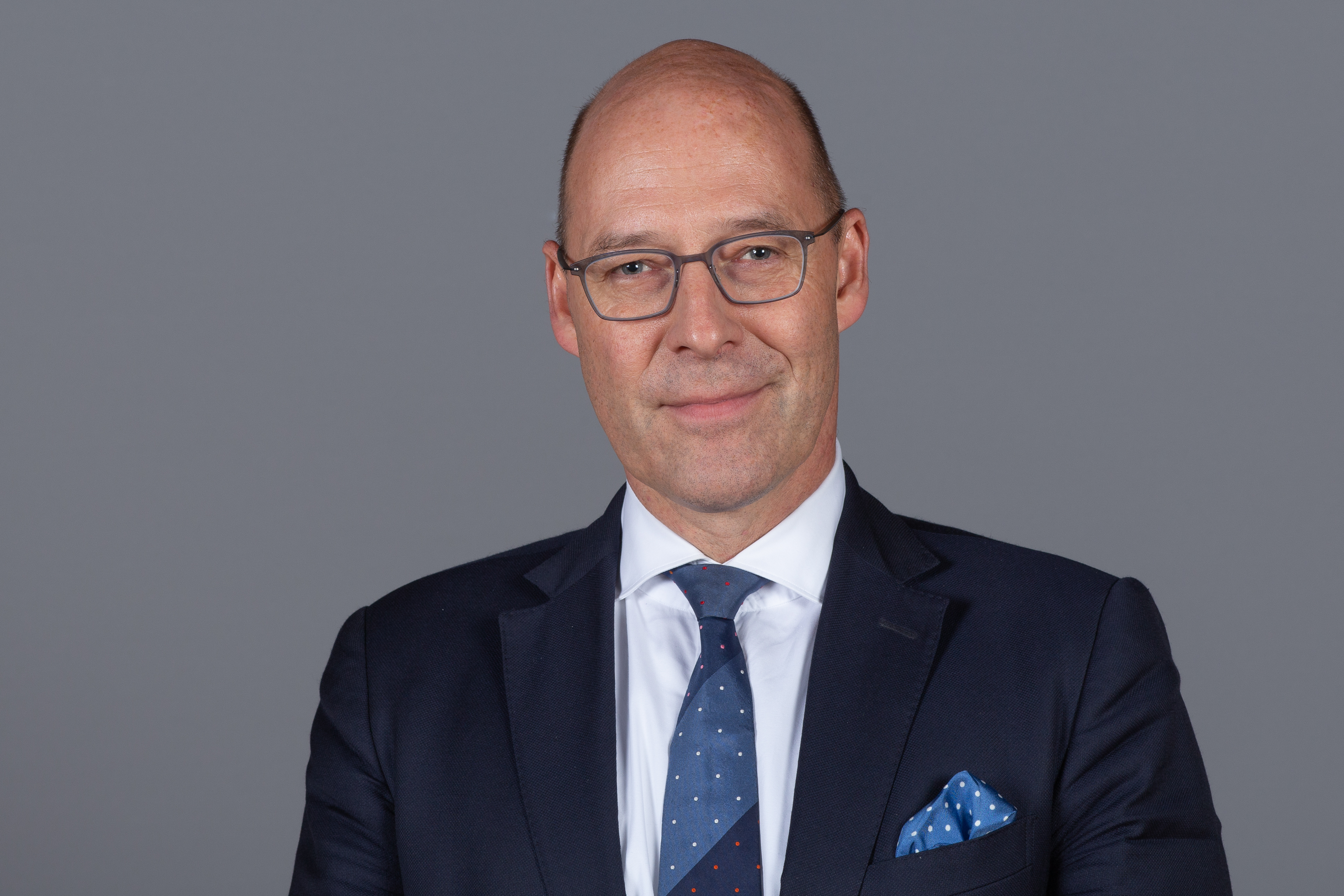
- Wolf in 2018

Member of the Bundestag
- Incumbent
- Assumed office TBD
- Constituency: Hamburg

Member of the Hamburg Parliament
- Incumbent
- Assumed office 2 March 2015

Personal details
- Born: 19 April 1967 (age 59)
- Party: Alternative for Germany (since 2014)

Alexander Wolf (born 19 April 1967) is a German politician who was elected member of the Bundestag in 2025. He has been a member of the Hamburg Parliament since 2015.

== Opinions ==
During the 30th anniversary commemorations of the Srebrenica massacre at the Bundestag on 11 July 2025, in the presence of relatives of the victims, Wolf denied in his speech that the event constituted genocide, stating that the executioners “systematically spared women and children while shooting men”.
