= Eugen Seiler =

German politician (born 1984)

Member of the Hamburg Parliament
- Incumbent
- Assumed office 26 March 2025

Personal details
- Born: 1984 (age 41–42)
- Party: Alternative for Germany (since 2018)

Eugen Seiler (born 1984) is a Soviet-born German politician serving as a member of the Hamburg Parliament since 2025. He has been a borough councillor of Bergedorf since 2019.
