= Carlo Clemens =

German politician (born 1989)

Member of the Landtag of North Rhine-Westphalia
- Incumbent
- Assumed office 1 June 2022

Personal details
- Born: 3 September 1989 (age 36) Bamberg
- Party: Alternative for Germany (since 2013)

Carlo Clemens (born 3 September 1989 in Bamberg) is a German politician serving as a member of the Landtag of North Rhine-Westphalia since 2022. From 2021 to 2022, he served as chairman of the Young Alternative for Germany.
