= Marco Schulz =

German politician (born 1993)

Member of the Hamburg Parliament
- Incumbent
- Assumed office 18 March 2020

Personal details
- Born: 27 July 1993 (age 32)
- Party: Alternative for Germany (since 2016)

Marco Schulz (born 27 July 1993) is a German politician serving as a member of the Hamburg Parliament since 2020. He has been a member of the Alternative for Germany since 2016.
