= Brandenburg University of Applied Sciences =

Coordinates: 52.4117°N 12.5370°E

- Technische Hochschule Brandenburg (THB)
- Magdeburger Straße 50, 14770 Brandenburg an der Havel, Germany; Federal state of Brandenburg; Germany

Information
- Type: Public
- Founded: 1992
- President: Prof. Dr. Andreas Wilms
- Enrollment: 2.647 WS 2018/19
- Website: www.th-brandenburg.de

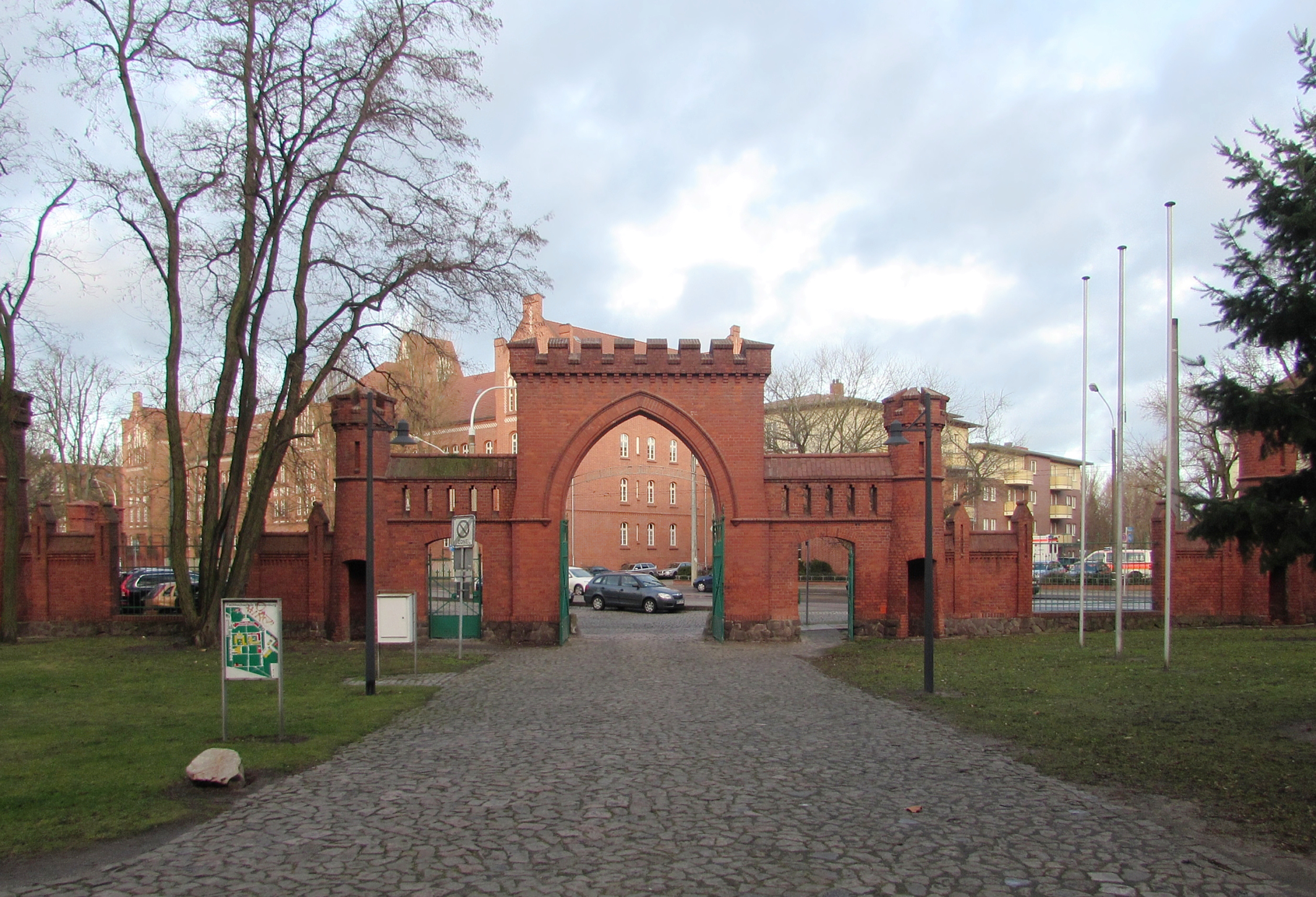

The Brandenburg University of Applied Sciences (official name German: Technische Hochschule Brandenburg, known as THB or TH Brandenburg) is a University of Applied Science (UAS) located in Brandenburg an der Havel, Germany. It was founded in 1992 as the Fachhochschule Brandenburg and became the first Hochschule of Brandenburg an der Havel. The campus of the Brandenburg University of Applied Sciences is situated in the Altstadt, in a former military complex from the 19th century. The students of the Brandenburg University of Applied Science are being supervised by about 260 employees. The focus of the courses of studies offered in the three faculties is on the so-called STEM subjects.
