= Panketal =

- Municipality
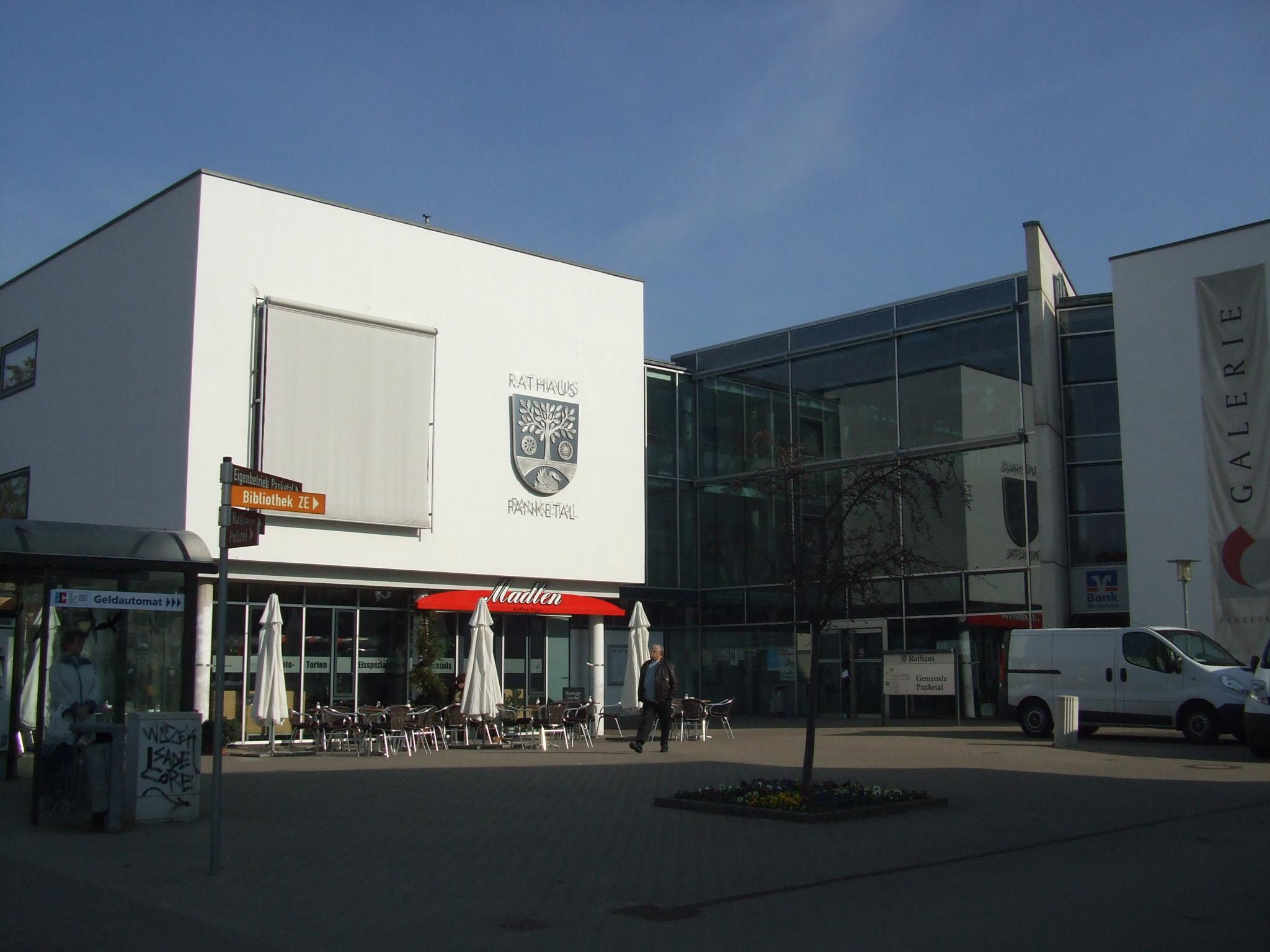
- Town Hall, 2010

- Coat of arms

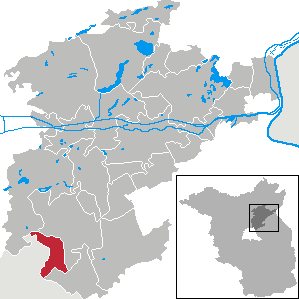
- Location of Panketal within Barnim district
- Interactive map of Panketal
- Location within Germany Location within Brandenburg
- Coordinates: 52°37′59″N 13°33′00″E
- Country: Germany
- State: Brandenburg
- District: Barnim
- Subdivisions: 2 Ortsteile

Government
  - Mayor (2018–26): Maximilian Wonke (SPD)

Area
  - Total: 25.85 km^{2} (9.98 sq mi)
- Elevation: 60 m (200 ft)

Population (2025-12-31)
  - Total: 21,343
  - Density: 825.6/km^{2} (2,138/sq mi)
- Time zone: UTC+01:00 (CET)
  - Summer (DST): UTC+02:00 (CEST)
- Postal codes: 16341
- Dialling codes: 030
- Vehicle registration: BAR
- Website: www.panketal.de

Panketal (German pronunciation: [ˈpaŋkətaːl], lit. 'Panke Valley') is a municipality in the district of Barnim, in Brandenburg, Germany. It is situated 15 km northeast of Berlin (centre).

== History ==
Panketal was created in 2003 by merging the municipalities Zepernick and Schwanebeck. Since 1996, the population has increased by 52.8%.

From 1815 to 1947, the constituent localities of Panketal were part of the Prussian Province of Brandenburg, from 1947 to 1952 of the State of Brandenburg, from 1952 to 1990 of the East German Bezirk Frankfurt and, since 1990, again of Brandenburg.

== Demography ==
Development of population since 1875 within the current boundaries. Blue line: population; dotted line: comparison to population development in Brandenburg state; grey background: time of Nazi rule; red background: time of communist rule)

Recent population development and projections. Blue line: population development before 2011 census; blue-bordered line: recent population development according to the 2011 Census in Germany; yellow line: official projections for 2005–2030; red line: 2014–2030; scarlet line: 2017–2030

Panketal: Population development
within the current boundaries (2017)

Year	Pop.	±% p.a.
1875	737	—
1890	834	+0.83%
1910	1,911	+4.23%
1925	4,165	+5.33%
1933	8,760	+9.74%
1939	11,538	+4.70%
1946	12,545	+1.20%

Year	Pop.	±% p.a.
1950	12,423	−0.24%
1964	11,905	−0.30%
1971	11,832	−0.09%
1981	11,286	−0.47%
1985	10,972	−0.70%
1990	10,271	−1.31%
1995	11,066	+1.50%

Year	Pop.	±% p.a.
2000	16,064	+7.74%
2005	18,623	+3.00%
2010	19,132	+0.54%
2015	20,131	+1.02%
2020	20,661	+0.52%
2025	21,343	+0.65%

== Recreation ==
In 2006 a ropes course was set up in the district Hobrechtsfelde. The ropes course had some 20 different training units. It was subsidized by Panketal with a total sum of 150,000 €. It closed early in 2014.

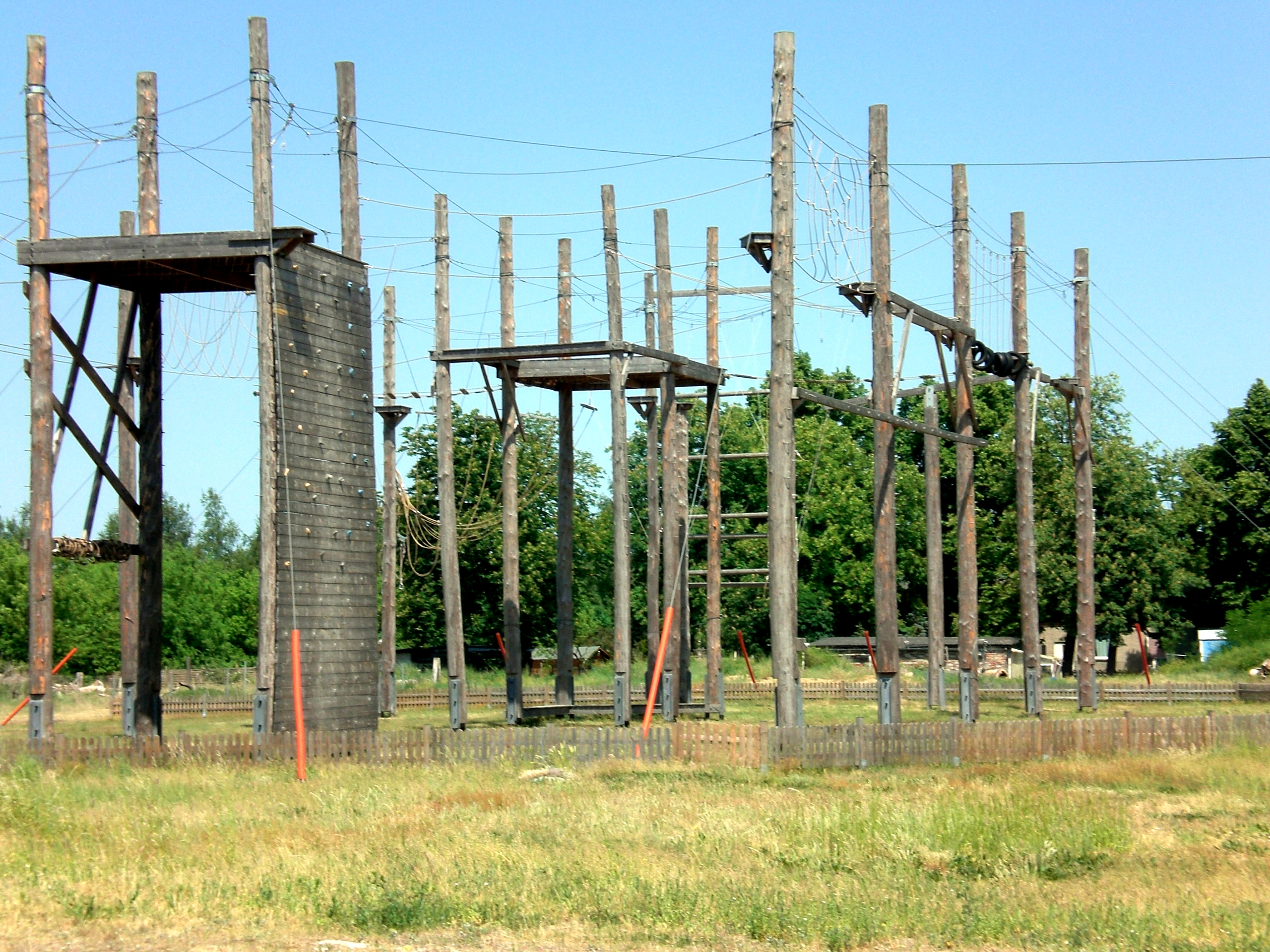
Ropes course in the climbing garden at Hobrechtsfelde

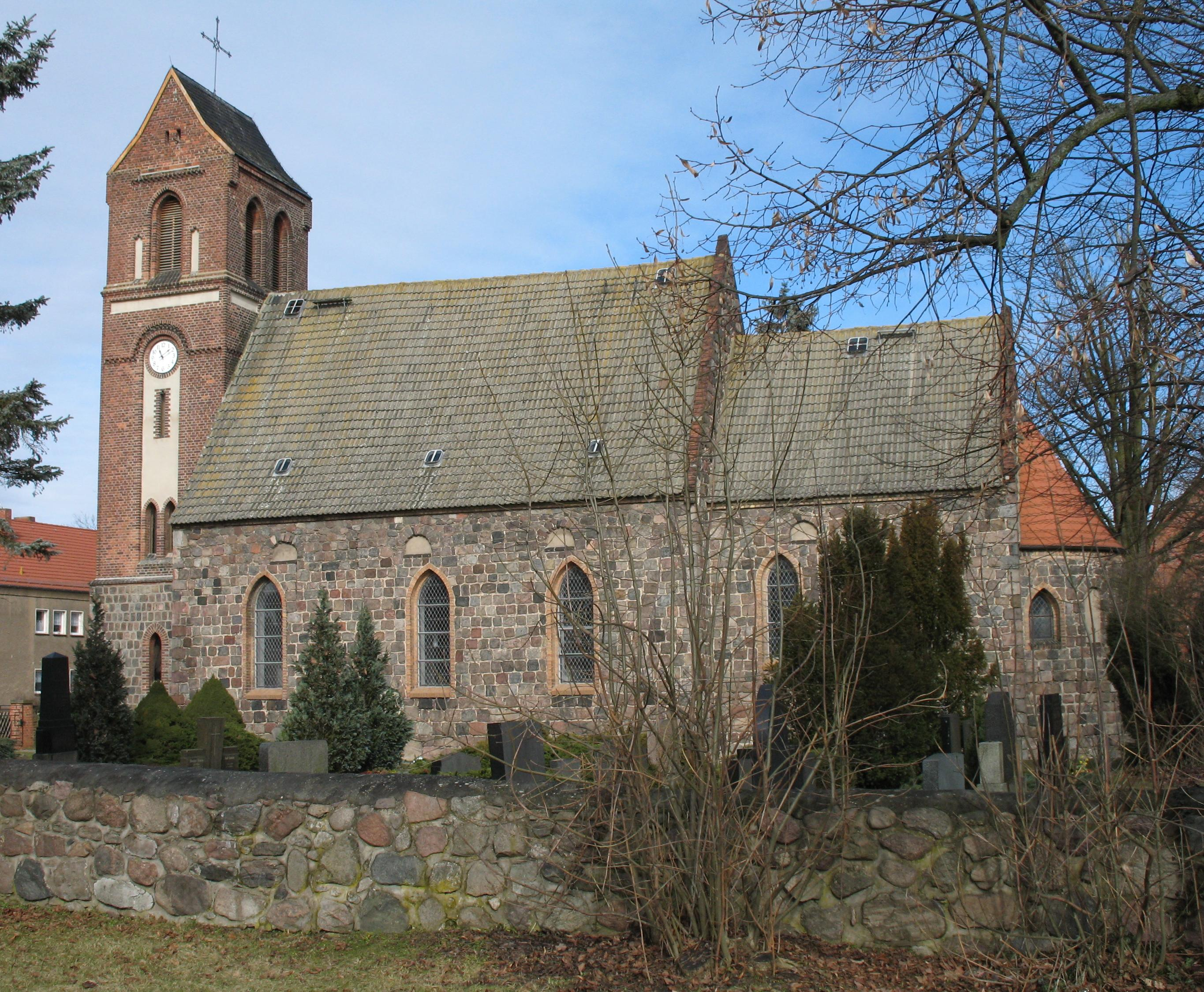
Church in Schwanebeck

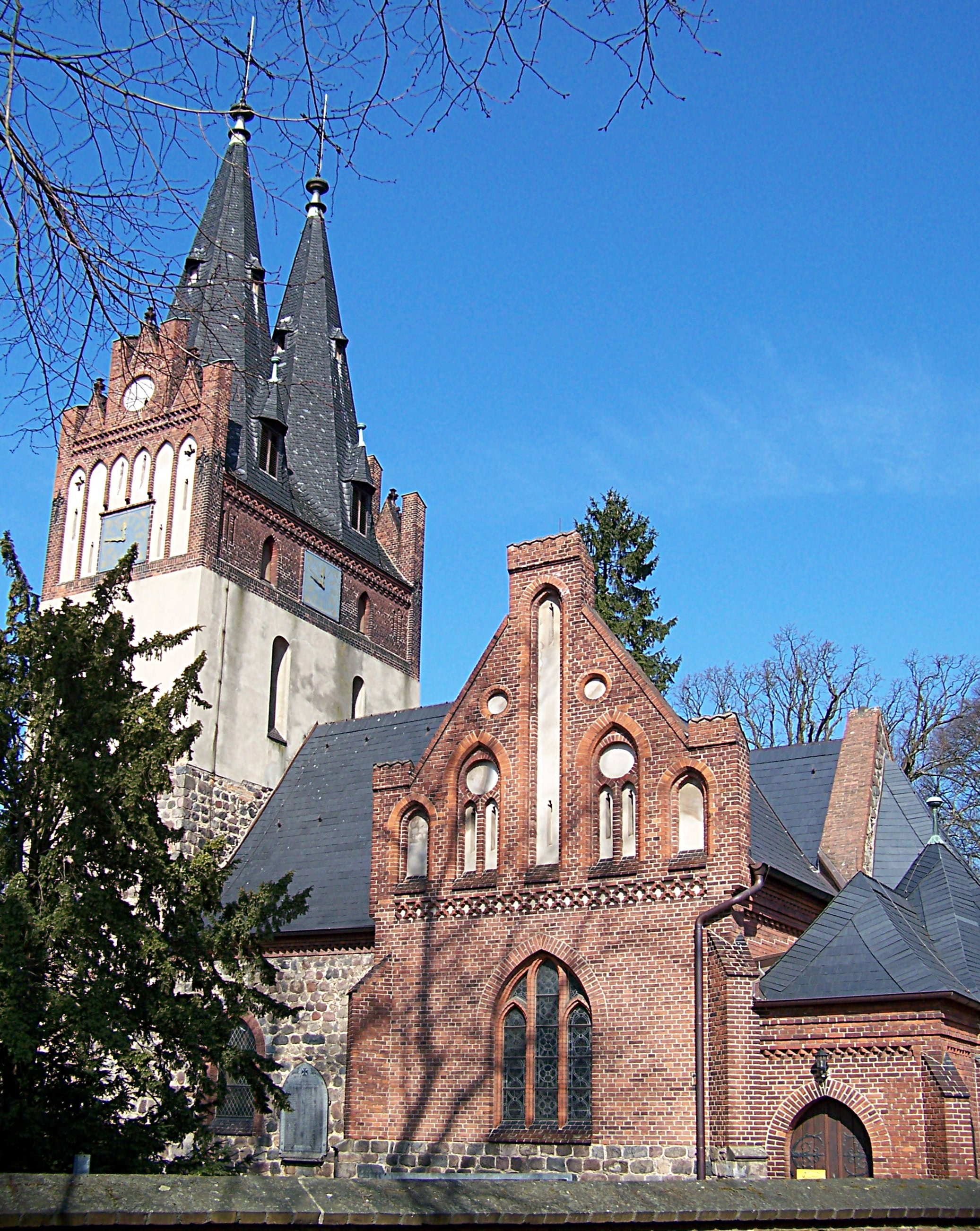
Church in Zepernick

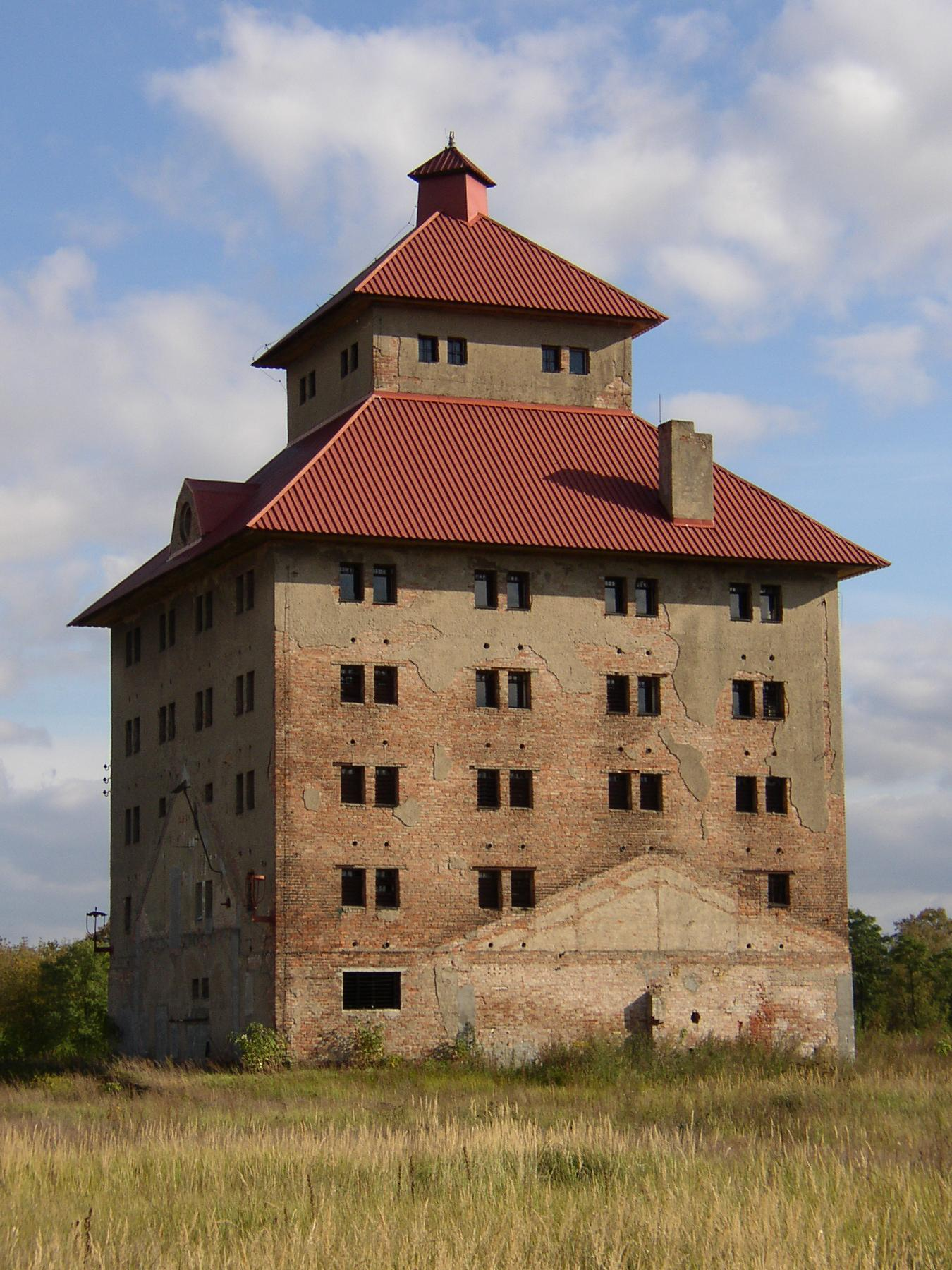
Former granary in Hobrechtsfelde

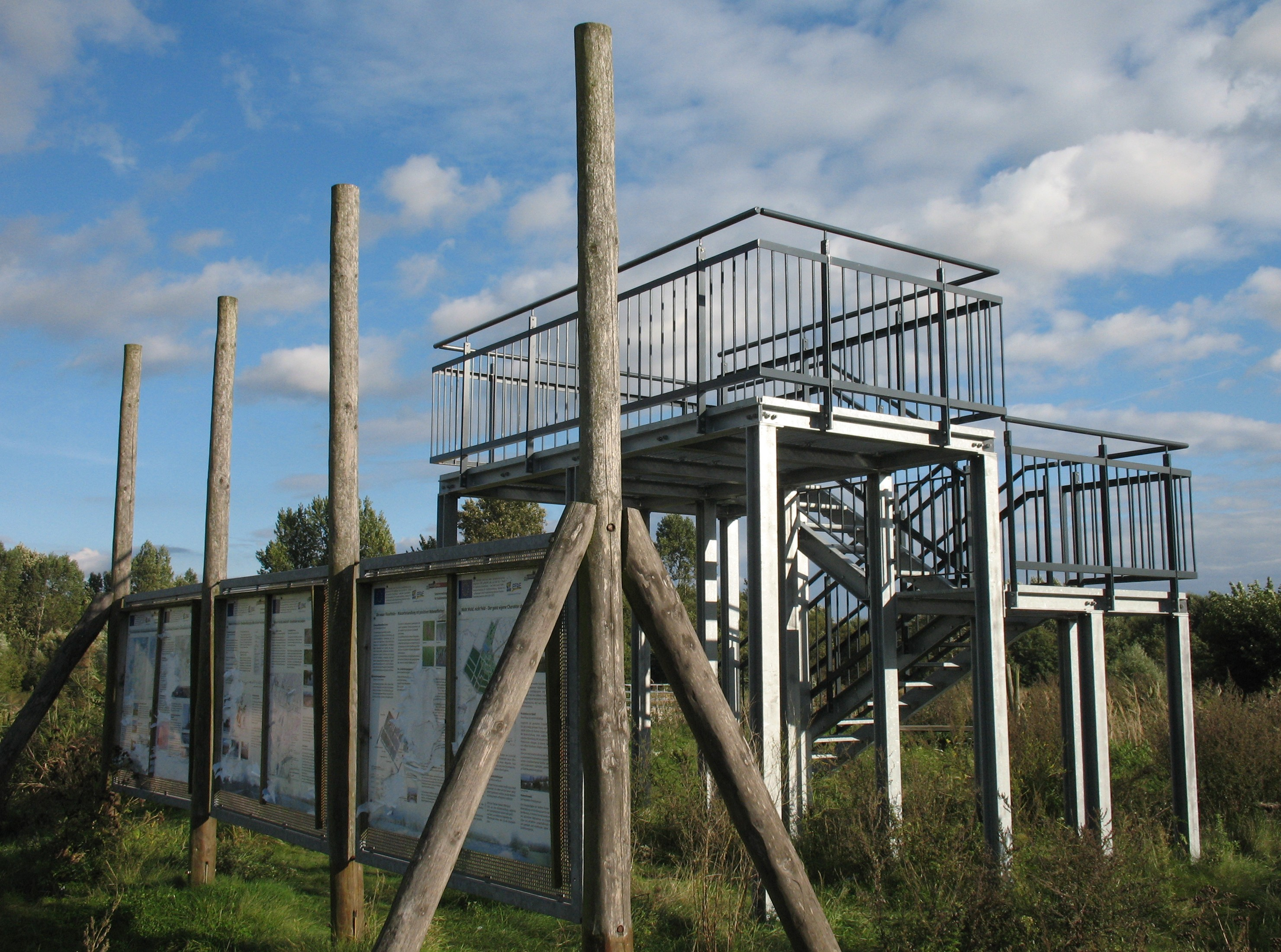
View point in Hobrechtsfelde
