= Krzysztof Walczak (politician) =

German politician (born 1994)

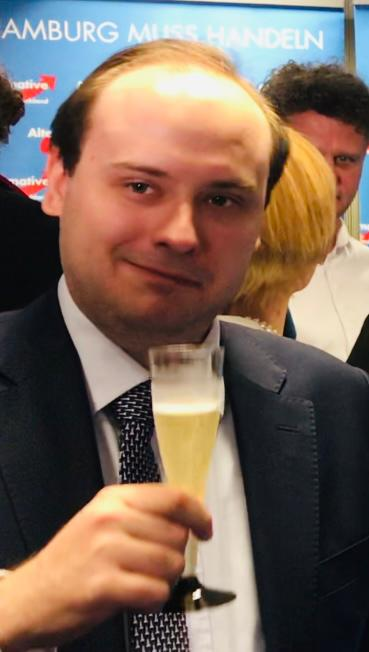
- Walczak in 2020

Member of the Hamburg Parliament
- Incumbent
- Assumed office 18 March 2020

Personal details
- Born: 9 September 1994 (age 31) Toruń
- Party: Alternative for Germany

Krzysztof Rafat Walczak (born 9 September 1994 in Toruń ) is a Polish-born German politician serving as a member of the Hamburg Parliament since 2020. He has served as chairman of the Alternative for Germany in Hamburg-Nord since 2022.
