= Brandenburg Office for the Protection of the Constitution =

- Headquarters: Potsdam
- Location: Land Brandenburg
- Staff: 119 (2020)
- Website: Offizielle Webseite

The Office for the Protection of the Constitution of Brandenburg is the Brandenburg state authority for the protection of the constitution. In organizational terms, it is a department of the Ministry of the Interior and for Local Affairs of the State of Brandenburg and thus not an independent authority like in other federal states. Its headquarters are in Potsdam.

== History ==
Ernst Uhrlau, the later president of the Federal Intelligence Service, was involved in setting up the Office for the Protection of the Constitution in Brandenburg in 1991.

As of December 31, 2021, the Office for the Protection of the Constitution had approximately 119 employees and a total of 1.69 million euros in material resources at its disposal in the 2020 financial year.

== Leadership ==
Zeitraum	Name	Bemerkung
1991–1996	Wolfgang Pfaff	From 1979 to 1991, he was the top terrorist investigator for the Federal Prosecutor's Office in Karlsruhe. His wife Waltraud committed suicide in June 1999. As a criminal director in the Brandenburg Ministry of the Interior, she headed the department for counter-espionage and sect control.
1996 – Oktober 1998	Hans-Jürgen Förster	2000–2008 permanent representative of the head of the Internal Security Department in the Federal Ministry of the Interior. From 2008 federal prosecutor at the Federal Court of Justice. Claims to have seen Ralf Wohlleben on a list of informants as part of the NPD ban proceedings.
November 1998 – Oktober 1999	Hasso Lieber	Wurde von damaligen Innenminister des Landes Brandenburg, Jörg Schönbohm in den einstweiligen Ruhestand versetzt. Lieber wurde im Jahr 2007 zum Berliner Justizstaatssekretär berufen.
15. Januar 2000 – Dezember 2004	Heiner Wegesin	He worked for the Federal Office for the Protection of the Constitution since 1988 and in the Federal Chancellery as a consultant from 1994. From spring 2006 to July 2011 he was head of department at the Federal Intelligence Service
31. Dezember 2004 – 31. Mai 2013	Winfriede Schreiber	Former police chief of Frankfurt (Oder)
1. Juni 2013 – Ende 2017	Carlo Weber	Former Chief Public Prosecutor in Frankfurt (Oder)
1. Februar 2018 – 19. Dezember 2019	Frank Nürnberger	Former head of the Central Aliens Authority of Brandenburg.
seit 10. Februar 2020	Jörg Müller	

== Known informants ==
- Toni Stadler printed the Ran an den Feind CD booklet by the music group Landser, which was declared a criminal organization by the Federal Court of Justice in March 2005.
- Carsten Szczepanski – Undercover agent and tyrant Gordian Meyer-Plath
