= Frankfurt (Oder) (electoral district) =

State electoral district of Germany

35: Frankfurt (Oder)
- Electoral district for the Landtag of Brandenburg
- Frankfurt (Oder) in 2024
- District: Frankfurt (Oder)
- Electorate: 42,942 (2024)
- Major settlements: Frankfurt (Oder)

Current electoral district
- Created: 1994
- Party: AfD
- Member: Wilko Möller

Frankfurt (Oder) is an electoral constituency (German: Wahlkreis) represented in the Landtag of Brandenburg. It elects one member via first-past-the-post voting. Under the constituency numbering system, it is designated as constituency 35. It is located in within the district of Frankfurt (Oder).

== Geography ==
The constituency is comprised by the entire town of Frankfurt (Oder).

There were 42,942 eligible voters in 2024.

== Members ==
Election	Member	Party	%
2004	Frank Hammer	PDS	39.2
2009	Axel Henschke	Left	39.0
2014	René Wilke	Left	31.0
2019	Wilko Möller	AfD	24.8
2024	Wilko Möller	AfD	33.8

== Election results ==
=== 2024 election ===
State election (2024): Frankfurt (Oder)
Notes:	Blue background denotes the winner of the electorate vote. Pink background denotes a candidate elected from their party list. Yellow background denotes an electorate win by a list member, or other incumbent. A ✓ or ✗ denotes status of any incumbent, win or lose respectively.						
Party	Candidate	Votes	%	±%	Party votes	%	±%
AfD	✓ Wilko Möller	9,721	33.6	▲8.9	8,498	29.2	▲4.7
SPD	Matthias Steinfurth	9,398	32.5	▲13.4	8,861	30.5	▲7.2
BSW					4,727	16.3	
CDU	Möckel	4,894	16.9	▲0.7	3,169	10.9	▼4.0
Left	Kreisel	2,155	7.5	▼14.7	1,106	3.8	▼13.7
BVB/FW	Fröhlich	1,764	6.1	▲1.9	603	2.1	▼1.2
Greens	Engelke	610	2.1	▼5.6	893	3.1	▼6.0
APT					568	2.0	▼0.3
Plus					216	0.7	▼0.4
FDP	Höhr	349	1.2	▼2.4	191	0.7	▼3.1
DLW					95	0.3	
Values					89	0.3	
DKP					38	0.1	
Third Way					25	0.1	
Informal votes		465			277		
Total valid votes		28,891			29,079		
Turnout		29,356	68.4	▲12.7			
AfD hold	Majority	323	1.1	▼1.6			

=== 2019 election ===
State election (2019): Frankfurt (Oder)
Notes:	Blue background denotes the winner of the electorate vote. Pink background denotes a candidate elected from their party list. Yellow background denotes an electorate win by a list member, or other incumbent. A ✓ or ✗ denotes status of any incumbent, win or lose respectively.						
Party	Candidate	Votes	%	±%	Party votes	%	±%
AfD	Wilko Möller	6,205	24.8	▲5.5	6,138	24.5	▲4.8
Left	Wolfgang Neumann	5,537	22.1	▼8.9	4,385	17.5	▼7.4
SPD	Dietrich Hanschel	4,800	19.2	▲0.4	5,833	23.3	▼1.4
CDU	Michael Möckel	4,055	16.2	▼3.8	3,744	14.9	▼4.5
Greens	Sahra Damus	1,932	7.7	▲3.4	2,270	9.1	▲3.8
BVB/FW	Rudolf Haas	1,054	4.2	▲3.2	832	3.3	▲2.3
FDP	Jens Dörschmann	892	3.6	▲2.4	953	3.8	▲2.7
Tierschutzpartei					558	2.2	
Die PARTEI	Philipp Herbert Axel Hennig	556	2.2	▲1.5			
Pirates					165	0.7	▼0.6
ÖDP					112	0.4	
V-Partei3					62	0.2	
Informal votes		327			306		
Total valid votes		25,031			25,052		
Turnout		25,358	55.7	▲9.5			
AfD gain from Left	Majority	668	2.7				

=== 2014 election ===
State election (2014): Frankfurt (Oder)
Notes:	Blue background denotes the winner of the electorate vote. Pink background denotes a candidate elected from their party list. Yellow background denotes an electorate win by a list member, or other incumbent. A ✓ or ✗ denotes status of any incumbent, win or lose respectively.						
Party	Candidate	Votes	%	±%	Party votes	%	±%
Left	René Wilke	6,786	31.0	▼8.0	5,442	24.9	▼9.2
CDU	Michael Möckel	4,366	20.0	▼0.6	5,442	24.9	▲0.5
AfD	Dr. Hartmut Händschke	4,222	19.3		4,307	19.7	
SPD	Wolfgang Pohl	4,105	18.8	▼5.0	5,411	24.7	▼4.8
Greens	Sahra Damus	945	4.3	▼1.5	1,160	5.3	▼0.1
NPD	Frank Maar	441	2.0	▼0.1	473	2.2	▲0.4
FDP	Wolfgang Mücke	262	1.2	▼4.3	242	1.1	▼5.1
Pirates	Martin Hampel	220	1.0		292	1.3	
BVB/FW	Jörg Pohl	208	1.0	▼0.1	224	1.0	▲0.1
Independent	Eckhard Gambke	153	0.7				
Die PARTEI	Sandro Jahn	153	0.7				
DKP					51	0.2	Steady
REP					35	0.2	Steady
Informal votes		384			357		
Total valid votes		21,861			21,888		
Turnout		22,245	46.2	▼17.9			
Left hold	Majority	2,420	11.0	▼4.2			

=== 2009 election ===
State election (2009): Frankfurt (Oder)
Notes:	Blue background denotes the winner of the electorate vote. Pink background denotes a candidate elected from their party list. Yellow background denotes an electorate win by a list member, or other incumbent. A ✓ or ✗ denotes status of any incumbent, win or lose respectively.						
Party	Candidate	Votes	%	±%	Party votes	%	±%
Left	Axel Henschke	12,309	39.0	▼0.2	10,822	34.1	▲0.9
SPD	Wolfgang Pohl	7,520	23.8	▲2.1	9,351	29.5	▲0.9
CDU	Bettina Albani	6,511	20.6	▼1.2	5,990	18.9	▲1.3
Greens	Alena Karaschinski	1,824	5.8	▲1.9	1,723	5.4	▲1.9
FDP	Mario Quast	1,745	5.5	▲1.7	1,966	6.2	▲3.1
NPD	Lars Beyer	671	2.1		559	1.8	
50Plus	Werner Voigt	620	2.0		380	1.2	▼0.5
DVU					372	1.2	▼3.5
BVB/FW	Simone Heyse	345	1.1		273	0.9	
RRP					126	0.4	
DKP					55	0.2	Steady
Die-Volksinitiative					54	0.2	
REP					54	0.2	
Informal votes		1,009			829		
Total valid votes		31,545			31,725		
Turnout		32,554	64.1	▲9.9			
Left hold	Majority	4,789	15.2	▼2.3			

=== 2004 election ===
State election (2004): Frankfurt (Oder)
Notes:	Blue background denotes the winner of the electorate vote. Pink background denotes a candidate elected from their party list. Yellow background denotes an electorate win by a list member, or other incumbent. A ✓ or ✗ denotes status of any incumbent, win or lose respectively.						
Party	Candidate	Votes	%	±%	Party votes	%	±%
PDS	Frank Hammer	11,018	39.19		9,408	33.18	
CDU	Ulrich Junghanns	6,140	21.84		4,999	17.63	
SPD	Wolfgang Pohl	6,106	21.72		8,106	28.59	
DVU					1,345	4.74	
AfW (Free Voters)	Detlef Gasche	1,581	5.62		422	1.49	
Greens	Jörg Gleisenstein	1,110	3.95		986	3.48	
FDP	Mario Quast	1,071	3.81		887	3.13	
Familie					741	2.61	
50Plus					493	1.74	
Gray Panthers					275	0.97	
Schill	Rainer Mäckel	675	2.40		247	0.87	
Independent	Eckhard Gambke	411	1.46				
AUB-Brandenburg					177	0.62	
BRB					127	0.45	
Yes Brandenburg					86	0.30	
DKP					56	0.20	
Informal votes		928			685		
Total valid votes		28,112			28,355		
Turnout		29,040	54.25				
PDS win new seat	Majority	4,878	17.35				

== See also ==
- Politics of Brandenburg
- Landtag of Brandenburg
