= Märkisch-Oderland I/Oder-Spree IV =

State electoral district of Germany

31: Märkisch-Oderland I/Oder-Spree IV
- Electoral district for the Landtag of Brandenburg
- Märkisch-Oderland I/Oder-Spree IV in 2024
- District: Märkisch-Oderland and Oder-Spree
- Electorate: 58,809 (2024)
- Major settlements: Erkner

Current electoral district
- Created: 1994
- Party: SPD
- Member: Jörg Vogelsänger

Märkisch-Oderland I/Oder-Spree IV is an electoral constituency (German: Wahlkreis) represented in the Landtag of Brandenburg. It elects one member via first-past-the-post voting. Under the constituency numbering system, it is designated as constituency 31. It is split between the districts of Märkisch-Oderland and Oder-Spree.

== Geography ==
The constituency includes the communities of Hoppengarten and Neuenhagen bei Berlin within Märkisch-Oderland, and the town of Erkner and the communities of Woltersdorf and Schöneiche within Oder-Spree.

There were 58,809 eligible voters in 2024.

== Members ==
Election	Member	Party	%
2004	Renate Adolph	PDS	32.8
2009	Renate Adolph	Left	34.0
2014	Jörg Vogelsänger	SPD	29.8
2019	Jörg Vogelsänger	SPD	22.5
2024	Jörg Vogelsänger	SPD	32.7

== Election results ==
=== 2024 election ===
State election (2024): Märkisch-Oderland I / Oder-Spree IV
Notes:	Blue background denotes the winner of the electorate vote. Pink background denotes a candidate elected from their party list. Yellow background denotes an electorate win by a list member, or other incumbent. A ✓ or ✗ denotes status of any incumbent, win or lose respectively.						
Party	Candidate	Votes	%	±%	Party votes	%	±%
SPD	Jörg Vogelsänger	14,282	32.7	▲10.2	13,067	29.7	▲5.8
AfD	Rainer Galla	12,410	28.4	▲9.5	11,262	25.6	▲5.7
BSW					7,095	16.1	
CDU	Schaller	7,104	16.2	▲2.1	5,350	12.2	▼0.7
BVB/FW	Obenauf	4,068	9.3	▼2.5	1,455	3.3	▼4.6
Left	Viertel	3,039	6.9	▼10.3	1,546	3.5	▼11.2
Greens	Dombrowski	1,377	3.1	▼9.2	2,087	4.7	▼8.0
APT					908	2.1	▼0.4
Plus	Löb	912	2.1		509	1.2	▼0.2
FDP	Iden	547	1.3	▼1.9	377	0.9	▼3.0
Values					111	0.3	
DLW					105	0.2	
Third Way					34	0.1	
DKP					32	0.1	
Informal votes		530			331		
Total valid votes		43,739			43,938		
Turnout		44,269	75.3	▲11.4			
SPD hold	Majority	1,872	4.3	▲4.6			

=== 2019 election ===
State election (2019): Märkisch-Oderland I/Oder-Spree IV
Notes:	Blue background denotes the winner of the electorate vote. Pink background denotes a candidate elected from their party list. Yellow background denotes an electorate win by a list member, or other incumbent. A ✓ or ✗ denotes status of any incumbent, win or lose respectively.						
Party	Candidate	Votes	%	±%	Party votes	%	±%
SPD	✓ Jörg Vogelsänger	8,282	22.5	▼7.3	8,831	23.9	▼4.4
AfD	Ute Bienia-Habrich	6,941	18.8	▲7.9	7,345	19.9	▲8.1
Left	Franziska Schneider	6,343	17.2	▼7.7	5,425	14.7	▼10.3
CDU	Jan-Peter Bündig	5,233	14.2	▼3.4	4,741	12.8	▼5.2
Greens	Erdmute Scheufele	4,544	12.3	▲4.0	4,714	12.8	▲5.3
BVB/FW	Dr. Philip Zeschmann	4,356	11.8	▲4.7	2,928	7.9	▲3.4
FDP	Claudia Schubert	1,176	3.2	▲1.6	1,420	3.8	▲2.4
Tierschutzpartei					924	2.5	
ÖDP					289	0.8	
Pirates					198	0.5	▼1.1
V-Partei3					100	0.3	
Informal votes		407			367		
Total valid votes		36,875			36,915		
Turnout		37,282	63.9	▲15.3			
SPD hold	Majority	1,341	3.7	▼1.2			

=== 2014 election ===
State election (2014): Märkisch-Oderland I/Oder-Spree IV
Notes:	Blue background denotes the winner of the electorate vote. Pink background denotes a candidate elected from their party list. Yellow background denotes an electorate win by a list member, or other incumbent. A ✓ or ✗ denotes status of any incumbent, win or lose respectively.						
Party	Candidate	Votes	%	±%	Party votes	%	±%
SPD	Jörg Vogelsänger	8,087	29.8	▲4.2	7,702	28.3	▼0.5
Left	Bernd Sachse	6,756	24.9	▼9.1	6,807	25.0	▼6.3
CDU	Corinna Fritzsche-Schnick	4,778	17.6	▼3.4	4,916	18.0	▲0.1
AfD	Christina Schade	2,950	10.9		3,215	11.8	
Greens	Michael Jungclaus	2,248	8.3	▼0.1	2,031	7.5	▼0.1
BVB/FW	Dr. Philip Zeschmann	1,921	7.1	▲5.3	1,231	4.5	▲3.0
Pirates					430	1.6	
FDP	Christine Juschka	433	1.6	▼5.2	394	1.4	▼6.9
NPD					381	1.4	▼0.6
DKP					81	0.3	▲0.2
REP					56	0.2	Steady
Informal votes		378			307		
Total valid votes		27,173			27,244		
Turnout		27,551	48.6	▼24.3			
SPD gain from Left	Majority	1,331	4.9				

=== 2009 election ===
State election (2009): Märkisch-Oderland I/Oder-Spree IV
Notes:	Blue background denotes the winner of the electorate vote. Pink background denotes a candidate elected from their party list. Yellow background denotes an electorate win by a list member, or other incumbent. A ✓ or ✗ denotes status of any incumbent, win or lose respectively.						
Party	Candidate	Votes	%	±%	Party votes	%	±%
Left	✓ Renate Adolph	13,339	34.0	▲1.2	12,323	31.3	▲1.0
SPD	Gunter Fritsch	10,017	25.6	▼3.9	11,336	28.8	▼2.8
CDU	Dierk Homeyer	8,232	21.0	▲0.2	7,060	17.9	▼0.8
Greens	Michael Jungclaus	3,295	8.4	▲3.1	3,009	7.6	▲2.9
FDP	Maurice Birnbaum	2,648	6.8	▲3.6	3,276	8.3	▲5.2
NPD	Andreas Kavalir	939	2.4		778	2.0	
BVB/FW	Hans-Jürgen Malirs	714	1.8		586	1.5	
DVU					457	1.2	▼3.0
50Plus					198	0.5	Steady
RRP					167	0.4	
REP					86	0.2	
Die-Volksinitiative					57	0.1	
DKP					55	0.1	▼0.1
Informal votes		1,021			817		
Total valid votes		39,184			39,388		
Turnout		40,205	72.9	▲14.8			
Left hold	Majority	3,322	8.4	▼5.1			

=== 2004 election ===
State election (2004): Märkisch-Oderland I/Oder-Spree IV
Notes:	Blue background denotes the winner of the electorate vote. Pink background denotes a candidate elected from their party list. Yellow background denotes an electorate win by a list member, or other incumbent. A ✓ or ✗ denotes status of any incumbent, win or lose respectively.						
Party	Candidate	Votes	%	±%	Party votes	%	±%
PDS	Renate Adolph	9,531	32.77		8,855	30.35	
SPD	Joachim Schulze	8,570	29.47		9,224	31.61	
CDU	Dierk Homeyer	6,048	20.80		5,452	18.68	
Greens	Susanne Brase	1,534	5.27		1,375	4.71	
DVU					1,221	4.18	
FDP	Lutz Kumlehn	937	3.22		892	3.06	
Familie					548	1.88	
AUB-Brandenburg	Franz Rudolf	809	2.78		442	1.51	
Gray Panthers	Hartmut Schwarz	666	2.29		407	1.39	
AfW (Free Voters)	Norbert Bürger	510	1.75		258	0.88	
Schill	René Rothe	476	1.64		150	0.51	
50Plus					136	0.47	
Yes Brandenburg					77	0.26	
BRB					75	0.26	
DKP					68	0.23	
Informal votes		522			423		
Total valid votes		29,081			29,180		
Turnout		29,603	58.10				
PDS win new seat	Majority	961	3.30				

== See also ==
- Politics of Brandenburg
- Landtag of Brandenburg
