= Dahme-Spreewald II/Oder-Spree I =

State electoral district of Germany

27: Dahme-Spreewald II/Oder-Spree I
- Electoral district for the Landtag of Brandenburg
- Dahme-Spreewald II/Oder-Spree I in 2024
- District: Dahme-Spreewald and Oder-Spree
- Electorate: 58,093 (2024)
- Major settlements: Königs Wusterhausen and Storkow

Current electoral district
- Created: 1994
- Party: SPD
- Member: Ludwig Scheetz

Dahme-Spreewald II/Oder-Spree I is an electoral constituency (German: Wahlkreis) represented in the Landtag of Brandenburg. It elects one member via first-past-the-post voting. Under the constituency numbering system, it is designated as constituency 27. It is split between the districts of Dahme-Spreewald and Oder-Spree.

== Geography ==
The constituency includes the town of Königs Wusterhausen within Dahme-Spreewald, and the town of Storkow, the municipality of Tauche, and the districts of Scharmützelsee and Spreenhagen within Oder-Spree.

There were 58,093 eligible voters in 2024.

== Members ==
Election	Member	Party	%
2004	Kerstin Osten	PDS	35.9
2009	Gerlinde Stobrawa	Left	32.5
2014	Klaus Ness	SPD	27.5
2019	Ludwig Scheetz	SPD	27.3
2024	Ludwig Scheetz	SPD	35.7

== Election results ==
=== 2024 election ===
State election (2024): Dahme-Spreewald II / Oder-Spree I
Notes:	Blue background denotes the winner of the electorate vote. Pink background denotes a candidate elected from their party list. Yellow background denotes an electorate win by a list member, or other incumbent. A ✓ or ✗ denotes status of any incumbent, win or lose respectively.						
Party	Candidate	Votes	%	±%	Party votes	%	±%
SPD	✓ Ludwig Scheetz	15,012	35.7	▲8.3	13,289	31.4	▲3.8
AfD	Benjamin Filter	14,004	33.3	▲10.4	12,789	30.2	▲6.4
BSW					6,095	14.4	
CDU	Schroeder	6,324	15.0	▲1.3	4,699	11.1	▼2.9
BVB/FW	Langner	2,997	7.1	▲0.5	1,090	2.6	▼3.0
Left	Ludwig	2,281	5.4	▼6.9	1,067	2.5	▼8.8
Greens	Brandes	740	1.8	▼6.6	1,328	3.1	▼6.4
APT					864	2.0	▼1.1
Plus					375	0.9	▼0.3
FDP	Plathe	495	1.2	▼1.7	347	0.8	▼2.8
DLW					0.5		
Values					110	0.3	
Third Way					63	0.1	
DKP	Steinhardt	243	0.6		38	0.1	
Informal votes		581			322		
Total valid votes		42,096			42,355		
Turnout		42,677	73.5	▲10.7			
SPD hold	Majority	1,008	2.4	▼2.0			

=== 2019 election ===
State election (2019): Dahme-Spreewald II/Oder-Spree I
Notes:	Blue background denotes the winner of the electorate vote. Pink background denotes a candidate elected from their party list. Yellow background denotes an electorate win by a list member, or other incumbent. A ✓ or ✗ denotes status of any incumbent, win or lose respectively.						
Party	Candidate	Votes	%	±%	Party votes	%	±%
SPD	Ludwig Scheetz	9,658	27.3	▼0.2	9,765	27.6	▼3.1
AfD	Andreas Kalbitz	8,079	22.9	▲12.5	8,430	23.8	▲11.1
CDU	Christian Schroeder	4,852	13.7	▼10.0	4,934	13.9	▼7.3
Left	Astrid Böger	4,340	12.3	▼10.0	3,997	11.3	▼9.2
Greens	Anja Grabs	2,944	8.3	▲3.7	3,390	9.6	▲4.8
BVB/FW	Heiko Eisen	2,327	6.6	▼0.2	1,961	5.5	▲2.0
Independent	Katharina Ennullat	2,108	6.0				
FDP	Jasmin Stüwe	1,010	2.9	▲1.3	1,280	3.6	▲2.1
Tierschutzpartei					1,112	3.1	
Pirates					208	0.6	▼0.8
ÖDP					195	0.6	
V-Partei3					99	0.3	
Informal votes		465			412		
Total valid votes		35,318			35,371		
Turnout		35,783	62.8	▲13.1			
SPD hold	Majority	1,579	4.4	▲0.6			

=== 2014 election ===
State election (2014): Dahme-Spreewald II/Oder-Spree I
Notes:	Blue background denotes the winner of the electorate vote. Pink background denotes a candidate elected from their party list. Yellow background denotes an electorate win by a list member, or other incumbent. A ✓ or ✗ denotes status of any incumbent, win or lose respectively.						
Party	Candidate	Votes	%	±%	Party votes	%	±%
SPD	Klaus Ness	7,426	27.5	▲0.4	8,308	30.7	▼1.6
CDU	Laura Lazarus	6,397	23.7	▲2.4	5,732	21.2	▲2.8
Left	Stefan Ludwig	6,020	22.3	▼10.2	5,551	20.5	▼9.2
AfD	Andreas Kalbitz	2,800	10.4		3,443	12.7	
BVB/FW	Christina Gericke	1,844	6.8	▲5.3	957	3.5	▲2.4
Greens	Anja Grabs	1,250	4.6	▼1.9	1,305	4.8	▼0.5
NPD	Klaus Beier	816	3.0	Steady	805	3.0	▲0.2
FDP	Raimund Tomczak	425	1.6	▼6.5	415	1.5	▼6.1
Pirates					368	1.4	
DKP					99	0.4	▲0.3
REP					38	0.1	▼0.1
Informal votes		379			336		
Total valid votes		26,978			27,021		
Turnout		27,357	49.7	▼19.5			
SPD gain from Left	Majority	1,029	3.8				

=== 2009 election ===
State election (2009): Dahme-Spreewald II/Oder-Spree I
Notes:	Blue background denotes the winner of the electorate vote. Pink background denotes a candidate elected from their party list. Yellow background denotes an electorate win by a list member, or other incumbent. A ✓ or ✗ denotes status of any incumbent, win or lose respectively.						
Party	Candidate	Votes	%	±%	Party votes	%	±%
Left	Gerlinde Stobrawa	11,844	32.5	▼3.4	10,928	29.7	▼0.8
SPD	Klaus Ness	9,873	27.1	▼0.9	11,871	32.3	▲0.6
CDU	Sebastian Jarantowski	7,744	21.3	▲1.2	6,771	18.4	▲0.9
FDP	Raimund Tomczak	2,953	8.1	▲2.6	2,788	7.6	▲4.3
Greens	Sigrid Henße	2,356	6.5	▲2.6	1,943	5.3	▲2.3
NPD	Sven-Gunnar Haverlandt	1,104	3.0		1,019	2.8	
DVU					477	1.3	▼4.5
BVB/FW	Alexander Schneider	546	1.5		411	1.1	
50Plus					213	0.6	▼0.2
RRP					143	0.4	
Die-Volksinitiative					89	0.2	
REP					62	0.2	
DKP					50	0.1	▼0.1
Informal votes		1,241			896		
Total valid votes		36,420			36,765		
Turnout		37,661	69.2	▲11.7			
Left hold	Majority	1,971	5.4	▼2.5			

=== 2004 election ===
State election (2004): Dahme-Spreewald II/Oder-SpreeI
Notes:	Blue background denotes the winner of the electorate vote. Pink background denotes a candidate elected from their party list. Yellow background denotes an electorate win by a list member, or other incumbent. A ✓ or ✗ denotes status of any incumbent, win or lose respectively.						
Party	Candidate	Votes	%	±%	Party votes	%	±%
PDS	Kerstin Osten	10,507	35.95		9,001	30.53	
SPD	Frank Bettin	8,176	27.97		9,344	31.69	
CDU	Detlef Karney	5,869	20.08		5,160	17.50	
DVU					1,720	5.83	
AfW (Free Voters)	Stephan Schötz	1,956	6.69		634	2.15	
FDP	Raimund Tomczak	1,595	5.46		982	3.33	
Greens	Sigrid Henße	1,127	3.86		897	3.04	
Familie					731	2.48	
Gray Panthers					272	0.92	
50Plus					248	0.84	
AUB-Brandenburg					175	0.59	
BRB					113	0.38	
Yes Brandenburg					83	0.28	
Schill					67	0.23	
DKP					57	0.19	
Informal votes		876			622		
Total valid votes		29,230			29,484		
Turnout		30,106	57.51				
PDS win new seat	Majority	2,331	7.98				

== See also ==
- Politics of Brandenburg
- Landtag of Brandenburg
