= Frankfurt (Oder) – Oder-Spree =

Federal electoral district of Germany

63 Frankfurt (Oder) – Oder-Spree
- Electoral district for the Bundestag
- Frankfurt (Oder) – Oder-Spree in 2025
- State: Brandenburg
- Population: 236,600 (2019)
- Electorate: 191,387 (2021)
- Major settlements: Frankfurt (Oder); Fürstenwalde; Eisenhüttenstadt
- Area: 2,404.6 km^{2}

Current electoral district
- Created: 1990
- Party: AfD
- Member: Rainer Galla
- Elected: 2025

Frankfurt (Oder) – Oder-Spree is an electoral constituency (German: Wahlkreis) represented in the Bundestag. It elects one member via first-past-the-post voting. Under the current constituency numbering system, it is designated as constituency 63. It is located in eastern Brandenburg, comprising the independent city of Frankfurt (Oder) and the district of Oder-Spree.

Frankfurt (Oder) – Oder-Spree was created for the inaugural 1990 federal election after German reunification. From 2021 to 2025, it was represented by Mathias Papendieck of the Social Democratic Party (SPD). Since 2025 it has been represented by Rainer Galla of the AfD.

== Geography ==
Frankfurt (Oder) – Oder-Spree is located in eastern Brandenburg. As of the 2021 federal election, it comprises the independent city of Frankfurt (Oder) and the district of Oder-Spree.

== History ==
Frankfurt (Oder) – Oder-Spree was created after German reunification in 1990, then known as Frankfurt (Oder) – Eisenhüttenstadt – Beeskow. It acquired its current name in the 2002 election. In the 1990 through 1998 elections, it was constituency 279 in the numbering system. In the 2002 and 2005 elections, it was number 63. In the 2009 election, it was number 64. Since the 2013 election, it has been number 63.

Originally, the constituency comprised the independent cities of Frankfurt (Oder) and Eisenhüttenstadt and the districts of Beeskow and Landkreis Eisenhüttenstadt. It acquired its current configuration and borders in the 2002 election.

| Election | No. | Name | Borders |
|---|---|---|---|
| 1990 | 279 | Frankfurt (Oder) – Eisenhüttenstadt – Beeskow | Frankfurt (Oder) city; Eisenhüttenstadt city; Beeskow district; Landkreis Eisenhüttenstadt district |
| 1994 | 279 | Frankfurt (Oder) – Eisenhüttenstadt – Beeskow | Frankfurt (Oder) city; Eisenhüttenstadt city; Beeskow district; Landkreis Eisenhüttenstadt district |
| 1998 | 279 | Frankfurt (Oder) – Eisenhüttenstadt – Beeskow | Frankfurt (Oder) city; Eisenhüttenstadt city; Beeskow district; Landkreis Eisenhüttenstadt district |
| 2002 | 63 | Frankfurt (Oder) – Oder-Spree | Frankfurt (Oder) city; Oder-Spree district |
| 2005 | 63 | Frankfurt (Oder) – Oder-Spree | Frankfurt (Oder) city; Oder-Spree district |
| 2009 | 64 | Frankfurt (Oder) – Oder-Spree | Frankfurt (Oder) city; Oder-Spree district |
| 2013 | 63 | Frankfurt (Oder) – Oder-Spree | Frankfurt (Oder) city; Oder-Spree district |
| 2017 | 63 | Frankfurt (Oder) – Oder-Spree | Frankfurt (Oder) city; Oder-Spree district |
| 2021 | 63 | Frankfurt (Oder) – Oder-Spree | Frankfurt (Oder) city; Oder-Spree district |
| 2025 | 63 | Frankfurt (Oder) – Oder-Spree | Frankfurt (Oder) city; Oder-Spree district |

== Members ==
The constituency was first represented by Ulrich Junghanns of the Christian Democratic Union (CDU) from 1990 to 1994. Winfried Mante of the Social Democratic Party (SPD) was elected in 1994 and served until 2002, followed by Jörg Vogelsänger from 2002 to 2009. Thomas Nord of The Left won the constituency in 2009, but was defeated in 2013. Martin Patzelt of the CDU served as representative from 2013 to 2021, when Mathias Papendieck regained it for the SPD. In 2025 Rainer Galla of the AFD defeated Papendieck.

| Election | Member | Party | % |
|---|---|---|---|
| 1990 | Ulrich Junghanns | CDU | 34.6 |
| 1994 | Winfried Mante | SPD | 42.4 |
| 1998 | Winfried Mante | SPD | 43.5 |
| 2002 | Jörg Vogelsänger | SPD | 43.9 |
| 2005 | Jörg Vogelsänger | SPD | 35.5 |
| 2009 | Thomas Nord | LINKE | 32.3 |
| 2013 | Martin Patzelt | CDU | 33.9 |
| 2017 | Martin Patzelt | CDU | 27.1 |
| 2021 | Mathias Papendieck | SPD | 28.0 |
| 2025 | Rainer Galla | AfD | 38.2 |

== Election results ==
=== 2025 election ===
Federal election (2025): Frankfurt (Oder) – Oder-Spree
| Notes: | Blue background denotes the winner of the electorate vote. Pink background denotes a candidate elected from their party list. Yellow background denotes an electorate win by a list member, or other incumbent. A ✓ or ✗ denotes status of any incumbent, win or lose respectively. | | | | | | |
| Party | Candidate | Votes | % | ±% | Party votes | % | ±% |
|---|---|---|---|---|---|---|---|
| AfD | Rainer Galla | 56,620 | 38.2 | ▲16.7 | 52,666 | 35.4 | ▲15.3 |
| SPD | ✗ Mathias Papendieck | 30,829 | 20.8 | ▼7.2 | 20,169 | 13.6 | ▼15.9 |
| CDU | Désirée Schrade | 27,856 | 18.8 | ▲2.5 | 24,737 | 16.6 | ▲2.5 |
| BSW | | | | | 18,735 | 12.6 | New |
| Left | Leon Kley | 16,785 | 11.3 | ▲0.2 | 15,777 | 10.6 | ▲1.1 |
| FW | Sylvia Conring | 5,726 | 3.9 | ▲0.2 | 2,155 | 1.4 | ▼1.2 |
| Greens | Jelle Kuiper | 4,463 | 3.0 | ▼3.3 | 7,066 | 4.8 | ▼2.4 |
| FDP | Richard Hennicke | 3,528 | 2.4 | ▼4.7 | 4,677 | 3.1 | ▼5.7 |
| Independent | Andreas Gliese | 2,388 | 1.6 | New | | | |
| PARTEI | | | | | 1,321 | 0.9 | ▼0.5 |
| Volt | | | | | 827 | 0.6 | ▲0.3 |
| BD | | | | | 403 | 0.3 | New |
| MLPD | | | | | 151 | 0.1 | 0.0 |
| Informal votes | | 1,575 | | | 1,092 | | |
| Total valid votes | | 148,195 | | | 148,678 | | |
| Turnout | | 149,770 | 79.7 | ▲5.3 | | | |
| AfD gain from SPD | Majority | 25,791 | 17.4 | N/A | | | |

=== 2021 election ===
Federal election (2021): Frankfurt (Oder) – Oder-Spree
| Notes: | Blue background denotes the winner of the electorate vote. Pink background denotes a candidate elected from their party list. Yellow background denotes an electorate win by a list member, or other incumbent. A ✓ or ✗ denotes status of any incumbent, win or lose respectively. | | | | | | |
| Party | Candidate | Votes | % | ±% | Party votes | % | ±% |
|---|---|---|---|---|---|---|---|
| SPD | Mathias Papendieck | 39,350 | 28.0 | ▲10.9 | 41,414 | 29.5 | ▲13.0 |
| AfD | Wilko Möller | 30,182 | 21.5 | ▼0.4 | 28,338 | 20.2 | ▼1.9 |
| CDU | Daniel Rosentreter | 22,876 | 16.3 | ▼10.8 | 19,890 | 14.1 | ▼10.4 |
| Left | Stefan Kunath | 15,690 | 11.2 | ▼8.0 | 13,436 | 9.6 | ▼9.4 |
| FDP | Jasmin Stüwe | 9,975 | 7.1 | ▲2.0 | 12,439 | 8.8 | ▲2.1 |
| Greens | Marcus Winter | 8,865 | 6.3 | ▲3.0 | 9,992 | 7.1 | ▲2.8 |
| FW | Kai Hamacher | 5,115 | 3.6 | ▲1.9 | 3,749 | 2.7 | ▲1.4 |
| Tierschutzpartei | | | | | 3,608 | 2.6 | ▲0.7 |
| PARTEI | Cindy Rosenkranz | 3,343 | 2.4 | ▲0.5 | 1,989 | 1.4 | 0.0 |
| dieBasis | Thomas Wötzel | 2,915 | 2.1 | | 2,420 | 1.7 | |
| Independent | Manuela Marquardt | 784 | 0.6 | | | | |
| Unabhängige | | | | | 736 | 0.5 | |
| NPD | | | | | 574 | 0.4 | ▼0.7 |
| Pirates | | | | | 495 | 0.4 | |
| Volt | | | | | 373 | 0.3 | |
| ÖDP | Norman Heß | 751 | 0.5 | | 347 | 0.2 | 0.0 |
| Team Todenhöfer | | | | | 306 | 0.2 | |
| DKP | | | | | 170 | 0.1 | ▼0.1 |
| Humanists | | | | | 158 | 0.1 | |
| MLPD | Dieter Weihrauch | 304 | 0.2 | ▼0.1 | 156 | 0.1 | ▼0.1 |
| Independent | Ralf Kaun | 291 | 0.2 | | | | |
| Informal votes | | 1,973 | | | 1,824 | | |
| Total valid votes | | 140,441 | | | 140,590 | | |
| Turnout | | 142,414 | 74.4 | ▲2.5 | | | |
| SPD gain from CDU | Majority | 9,168 | 6.5 | | | | |

=== 2017 election ===
Federal election (2017): Frankfurt (Oder) – Oder-Spree
| Notes: | Blue background denotes the winner of the electorate vote. Pink background denotes a candidate elected from their party list. Yellow background denotes an electorate win by a list member, or other incumbent. A ✓ or ✗ denotes status of any incumbent, win or lose respectively. | | | | | | |
| Party | Candidate | Votes | % | ±% | Party votes | % | ±% |
|---|---|---|---|---|---|---|---|
| CDU | ✓ Martin Patzelt | 37,344 | 27.1 | ▼6.9 | 33,888 | 24.6 | ▼8.8 |
| AfD | Alexander Gauland | 30,261 | 21.9 | | 30,477 | 22.1 | ▲15.6 |
| Left | Thomas Nord | 26,401 | 19.1 | ▼8.9 | 26,202 | 19.0 | ▼5.8 |
| SPD | Franz H. Berger | 23,598 | 17.1 | ▼7.3 | 22,702 | 16.5 | ▼5.9 |
| FDP | Manfred Dietrich | 7,008 | 5.1 | ▲3.4 | 9,241 | 6.7 | ▲4.5 |
| Greens | Clemens Rostock | 4,504 | 3.3 | ▼0.7 | 5,896 | 4.3 | ▲0.3 |
| Tierschutzpartei | | | | | 2,520 | 1.8 | |
| PARTEI | Floris Beer | 2,582 | 1.9 | | 2,016 | 1.5 | |
| FW | Philip Zeschmann | 2,462 | 1.8 | | 1,764 | 1.3 | ▲0.4 |
| NPD | Manuela Kokott | 1,369 | 1.0 | ▼3.2 | 1,509 | 1.1 | ▼2.0 |
| Independent | Ronny Meier | 911 | 0.7 | | | | |
| Pirates | Kai Hamacher | 756 | 0.5 | ▼3.2 | | | |
| BGE | | | | | 581 | 0.4 | |
| DM | | | | | 447 | 0.3 | |
| ÖDP | | | | | 280 | 0.2 | |
| MLPD | Dieter Weihrauch | 398 | 0.3 | | 231 | 0.2 | 0.0 |
| DKP | Karl Voigt | 365 | 0.3 | | 244 | 0.2 | |
| Informal votes | | 2,092 | | | 2,053 | | |
| Total valid votes | | 137,959 | | | 137,998 | | |
| Turnout | | 140,051 | 71.9 | ▲4.0 | | | |
| CDU hold | Majority | 7,083 | 5.2 | ▼0.7 | | | |

=== 2013 election ===
Federal election (2013): Frankfurt (Oder) – Oder-Spree
| Notes: | Blue background denotes the winner of the electorate vote. Pink background denotes a candidate elected from their party list. Yellow background denotes an electorate win by a list member, or other incumbent. A ✓ or ✗ denotes status of any incumbent, win or lose respectively. | | | | | | |
| Party | Candidate | Votes | % | ±% | Party votes | % | ±% |
|---|---|---|---|---|---|---|---|
| CDU | Martin Patzelt | 44,822 | 33.9 | ▲11.5 | 44,301 | 33.4 | ▲10.9 |
| Left | ✗ Thomas Nord | 37,008 | 28.0 | ▼4.3 | 32,862 | 24.7 | ▼6.7 |
| SPD | Lars Wendland | 32,291 | 24.4 | ▼4.1 | 29,631 | 22.3 | ▼1.8 |
| AfD | | | | | 8,562 | 6.4 | |
| NPD | Klaus Beier | 5,584 | 4.2 | ▲0.6 | 4,058 | 3.1 | ▲0.3 |
| Greens | Jörg Gleisenstein | 5,192 | 3.9 | ▼1.6 | 5,266 | 4.0 | ▼1.5 |
| Pirates | Martin Hampel | 4,977 | 3.8 | | 2,911 | 2.2 | ▼0.3 |
| FDP | Rolf Offermann | 2,252 | 1.7 | ▼5.8 | 2,922 | 2.2 | ▼6.7 |
| FW | | | | | 1,219 | 0.9 | |
| PRO | | | | | 642 | 0.5 | |
| REP | | | | | 258 | 0.2 | ▼0.1 |
| MLPD | | | | | 198 | 0.1 | 0.0 |
| Informal votes | | 3,167 | | | 2,463 | | |
| Total valid votes | | 132,126 | | | 132,830 | | |
| Turnout | | 135,293 | 67.9 | ▲1.1 | | | |
| CDU gain from Left | Majority | 7,814 | 5.9 | | | | |

=== 2009 election ===
Federal election (2009): Frankfurt (Oder) – Oder-Spree
| Notes: | Blue background denotes the winner of the electorate vote. Pink background denotes a candidate elected from their party list. Yellow background denotes an electorate win by a list member, or other incumbent. A ✓ or ✗ denotes status of any incumbent, win or lose respectively. | | | | | | |
| Party | Candidate | Votes | % | ±% | Party votes | % | ±% |
|---|---|---|---|---|---|---|---|
| Left | Thomas Nord | 43,589 | 32.3 | ▼0.9 | 42,581 | 31.4 | ▲2.3 |
| SPD | ✗ Jörg Vogelsänger | 38,470 | 28.5 | ▼6.9 | 32,750 | 24.1 | ▼11.2 |
| CDU | Christian Römhild | 30,153 | 22.4 | ▲1.9 | 30,506 | 22.5 | ▲3.5 |
| FDP | Rolf Offermann | 10,125 | 7.5 | ▲3.5 | 12,018 | 8.9 | ▲2.5 |
| Greens | Annalena Baerbock | 7,502 | 5.6 | ▲2.8 | 7,464 | 5.5 | ▲1.0 |
| NPD | Klaus Beier | 4,928 | 3.7 | 0.0 | 3,788 | 2.8 | ▼0.8 |
| Pirates | | | | | 3,385 | 2.5 | |
| FWD | | | | | 1,108 | 0.8 | |
| DVU | | | | | 1,052 | 0.8 | |
| REP | | | | | 395 | 0.3 | |
| BüSo | | | | | 374 | 0.3 | |
| MLPD | | | | | 210 | 0.2 | ▼0.2 |
| Informal votes | | 4,461 | | | 3,597 | | |
| Total valid votes | | 134,767 | | | 135,631 | | |
| Turnout | | 139,228 | 66.8 | ▼8.2 | | | |
| Left gain from SPD | Majority | 5,119 | 3.8 | | | | |

=== 2005 election ===
Federal election (2005):Frankfurt (Oder) – Oder-Spree
| Notes: | Blue background denotes the winner of the electorate vote. Pink background denotes a candidate elected from their party list. Yellow background denotes an electorate win by a list member, or other incumbent. A ✓ or ✗ denotes status of any incumbent, win or lose respectively. | | | | | | |
| Party | Candidate | Votes | % | ±% | Party votes | % | ±% |
|---|---|---|---|---|---|---|---|
| SPD | ✓ Jörg Vogelsänger | 55,335 | 35.5 | ▼8.4 | 55,201 | 35.3 | ▼10.2 |
| Left | Lothar Bisky | 51,895 | 33.3 | ▲11.4 | 45,467 | 29.1 | ▲10.2 |
| CDU | Knut Paul | 31,943 | 20.5 | ▼1.6 | 29,626 | 19.0 | ▼2.9 |
| FDP | Andreas Stark | 6,256 | 4.0 | ▼1.0 | 9,917 | 6.3 | ▲0.9 |
| NPD | Klaus Beier | 5,679 | 3.6 | ▲1.3 | 5,602 | 3.6 | ▲1.8 |
| Greens | Clemens Rostock | 56,79 | 3.6 | ▲1.3 | 5,602 | 3.6 | ▲1.8 |
| GRAUEN | | | | | 1,686 | 1.1 | ▲0.3 |
| 50Plus The Generation-Alliance | | | | | 1,182 | 0.8 | |
| Independent | Mario Knispel | 629 | 0.4 | | | | |
| MLPD | | | | | 500 | 0.3 | |
| Informal votes | | 2,957 | | | 2,767 | | |
| Total valid votes | | 156,069 | | | 156,259 | | |
| Turnout | | 159,026 | 75.0 | ▲2.2 | | | |
| SPD hold | Majority | 3,440 | 2.2 | | | | |
