= Oder-Spree II =

State electoral district of Germany

29: Oder-Spree II
- Electoral district for the Landtag of Brandenburg
- Oder-Spree II in 2024
- District: Oder-Spree
- Electorate: 42,504 (2024)
- Major settlements: Eisenhüttenstadt and Friedland

Current electoral district
- Created: 1994
- Party: AfD
- Member: Dennis Hohloch

Oder-Spree II is an electoral constituency (German: Wahlkreis) represented in the Landtag of Brandenburg. It elects one member via first-past-the-post voting. Under the constituency numbering system, it is designated as constituency 29. It is located in within the district of Oder-Spree.

== Geography ==
The constituency includes the towns of Eisenhüttenstadt and Friedland, as well as the districts of Brieskow-Finkenheerd, Neuzelle, and Schlaubetal.

There were 42,504 eligible voters in 2024.

== Members ==
Election	Member	Party	%
2004	Helga Böhnisch	PDS	27.9
2009	Helga Böhnisch	Left	32.8
2014	Andreas Gliese	CDU	24.3
2019	Kathleen Muxel	AfD	28.3
2024	Dennis Hohloch	AfD	40.5

== Election results ==
=== 2024 election ===
State election (2024): Oder-Spree II
Notes:	Blue background denotes the winner of the electorate vote. Pink background denotes a candidate elected from their party list. Yellow background denotes an electorate win by a list member, or other incumbent. A ✓ or ✗ denotes status of any incumbent, win or lose respectively.						
Party	Candidate	Votes	%	±%	Party votes	%	±%
AfD	Dennis Hohloch	12,303	40.5	▲12.1	11,346	37.1	▲6.6
SPD	Björn Wotschefski	8,304	27.3	▲5.8	8,562	28.0	▲3.0
BSW					4,621	15.1	
CDU	Markus Zaplata	4,138	13.6	▼9.6	3,103	10.2	▼5.9
BVB/FW	Thoralf Schapke	1,954	6.4	▼0.9	734	2.4	▼3.0
Independent	Andreas Gliese	1,276	4.2				
Left	Katharina Slanina	1,236	4.1	▼7.7	619	2.0	▼8.0
APT					486	1.6	▼1.1
Plus	Norman Heß	435	1.4		199	0.7	▼0.6
FDP	Manfred Dietrich	413	1.4	▼1.5	176	0.6	▼3.1
Greens	Ronny Böhme	340	1.1	▼4.0	407	1.3	▼3.8
Values					126	0.4	
DLW					125	0.4	
Third Way					32	0.1	
DKP					25	0.1	
Informal votes		483			321		
Total valid votes		30,399			30,561		
Turnout		30,882	72.7	▲13.0			
AfD hold	Majority	3,999	13.2	▲6.4			

=== 2019 election ===
State election (2019): Oder-Spree II
Notes:	Blue background denotes the winner of the electorate vote. Pink background denotes a candidate elected from their party list. Yellow background denotes an electorate win by a list member, or other incumbent. A ✓ or ✗ denotes status of any incumbent, win or lose respectively.						
Party	Candidate	Votes	%	±%	Party votes	%	±%
AfD	Kathleen Muxel	7,445	28.3	▲9.8	8,031	30.5	▲9.2
CDU	✗ Andreas Gliese	6,089	23.2	▼1.1	4,220	16.0	▼5.8
SPD	Christiane Barcikowski	5,653	21.5	▼0.2	6,591	25.1	▼2.3
Left	Mirko Böhnisch	3,095	11.8	▼7.2	2,639	10.0	▼7.2
BVB/FW	Thoralf Schapke	1,925	7.3	▲1.0	1,414	5.4	▲2.9
Greens	Carolin Hilschenz	1,335	5.1	▲2.7	1,346	5.1	▲2.3
FDP	Henry Schumann	745	2.8	Steady	973	3.7	▲2.5
Tierschutzpartei					697	2.6	
Pirates					190	0.7	▼0.6
ÖDP					146	0.6	
V-Partei3					56	0.2	
Informal votes		377			361		
Total valid votes		26,287			26,303		
Turnout		26,664	59.6	▲10.9			
AfD gain from CDU	Majority	1,356	6.8				

=== 2014 election ===
State election (2014): Oder-Spree II
Notes:	Blue background denotes the winner of the electorate vote. Pink background denotes a candidate elected from their party list. Yellow background denotes an electorate win by a list member, or other incumbent. A ✓ or ✗ denotes status of any incumbent, win or lose respectively.						
Party	Candidate	Votes	%	±%	Party votes	%	±%
CDU	Andreas Gliese	5,517	24.3	▲3.2	4,966	21.8	▲2.7
SPD	Detlef Baer	4,922	21.7	▼5.2	6,222	27.4	▼6.0
Left	Heidemarie Wiechmann	4,321	19.0	▼13.8	3,909	17.2	▼11.9
AfD	Wilfried Selenz	4,204	18.5		4,848	21.3	
BVB/FW	Egon Niemack	1,442	6.3	▲2.1	570	2.5	▲0.4
NPD	Gerd Wagner	841	3.7	▲0.9	861	3.8	▲1.3
FDP	Dietmar Baesler	641	2.8	▼3.0	277	2.1	▼5.4
Greens	Karoline Weiß	555	2.4	▼1.7	645	2.8	▼0.8
Pirates	Frank Behr	267	1.2		300	1.3	
REP					103	0.5	Steady
DKP					44	0.2	Steady
Informal votes		417			382		
Total valid votes		22,710			22,745		
Turnout		23,127	48.7	▼18.9			
CDU gain from Left	Majority	595	2.6				

=== 2009 election ===
State election (2009): Oder-Spree II
Notes:	Blue background denotes the winner of the electorate vote. Pink background denotes a candidate elected from their party list. Yellow background denotes an electorate win by a list member, or other incumbent. A ✓ or ✗ denotes status of any incumbent, win or lose respectively.						
Party	Candidate	Votes	%	±%	Party votes	%	±%
Left	✓ Helga Böhnisch	10,950	32.8	▲4.9	9,803	29.1	▲0.3
SPD	Peter Müller	8,966	26.9	▲7.7	11,232	33.4	4.9
CDU	Andrea Gliese	7,028	21.1	▲4.8	6,437	19.1	▲0.3
FDP	Frank Ullrich	1,940	5.8	▲2.7	2,214	6.6	▲3.7
BVB/FW	Egon Niemack	1,404	4.2		704	2.1	
Greens	Clemens Rostock	1,360	4.1	▲2.0	1,206	3.6	▲1.7
NPD	Gerd Wagner	942	2.8		826	2.5	
50Plus	Petra Streit	793	2.4		438	1.3	▼0.2
DVU					371	1.1	▼5.9
REP					177	0.5	
RRP					128	0.4	
Die-Volksinitiative					51	0.2	
DKP					51	0.2	Steady
Informal votes		1,152			897		
Total valid votes		33,383			33,638		
Turnout		34,535	67.6	▲10.9			
Left hold	Majority	1,984	5.9	▼2.8			

=== 2004 election ===
State election (2004): Oder-Spree II
Notes:	Blue background denotes the winner of the electorate vote. Pink background denotes a candidate elected from their party list. Yellow background denotes an electorate win by a list member, or other incumbent. A ✓ or ✗ denotes status of any incumbent, win or lose respectively.						
Party	Candidate	Votes	%	±%	Party votes	%	±%
PDS	Helga Böhnisch	8,199	27.89		8,491	28.79	
Independent	Werner Ruppert	7,058	24.01				
SPD	Ingrid Siebke	5,656	19.24		8,392	28.46	
CDU	Marina Marquardt	4,802	16.33		5,535	18.77	
DVU					2,057	6.98	
Familie					1,174	3.98	
AfW (Free Voters)	Karl-Friedrich Rubach	2,178	7.41		873	2.96	
FDP	Thomas Rein	905	3.08		842	2.86	
Greens	Oliver Heisel	603	2.05		559	1.90	
50Plus					428	1.45	
Gray Panthers					366	1.24	
BRB					244	0.83	
AUB-Brandenburg					202	0.68	
Yes Brandenburg					196	0.66	
Schill					68	0.23	
DKP					64	0.22	
Informal votes		1,155			1,065		
Total valid votes		29,401			29,491		
Turnout		30,556	56.70				
PDS win new seat	Majority	1,141	3.88				

== See also ==
- Politics of Brandenburg
- Landtag of Brandenburg
