= Ludwig Scheetz =

German politician (born 1986)

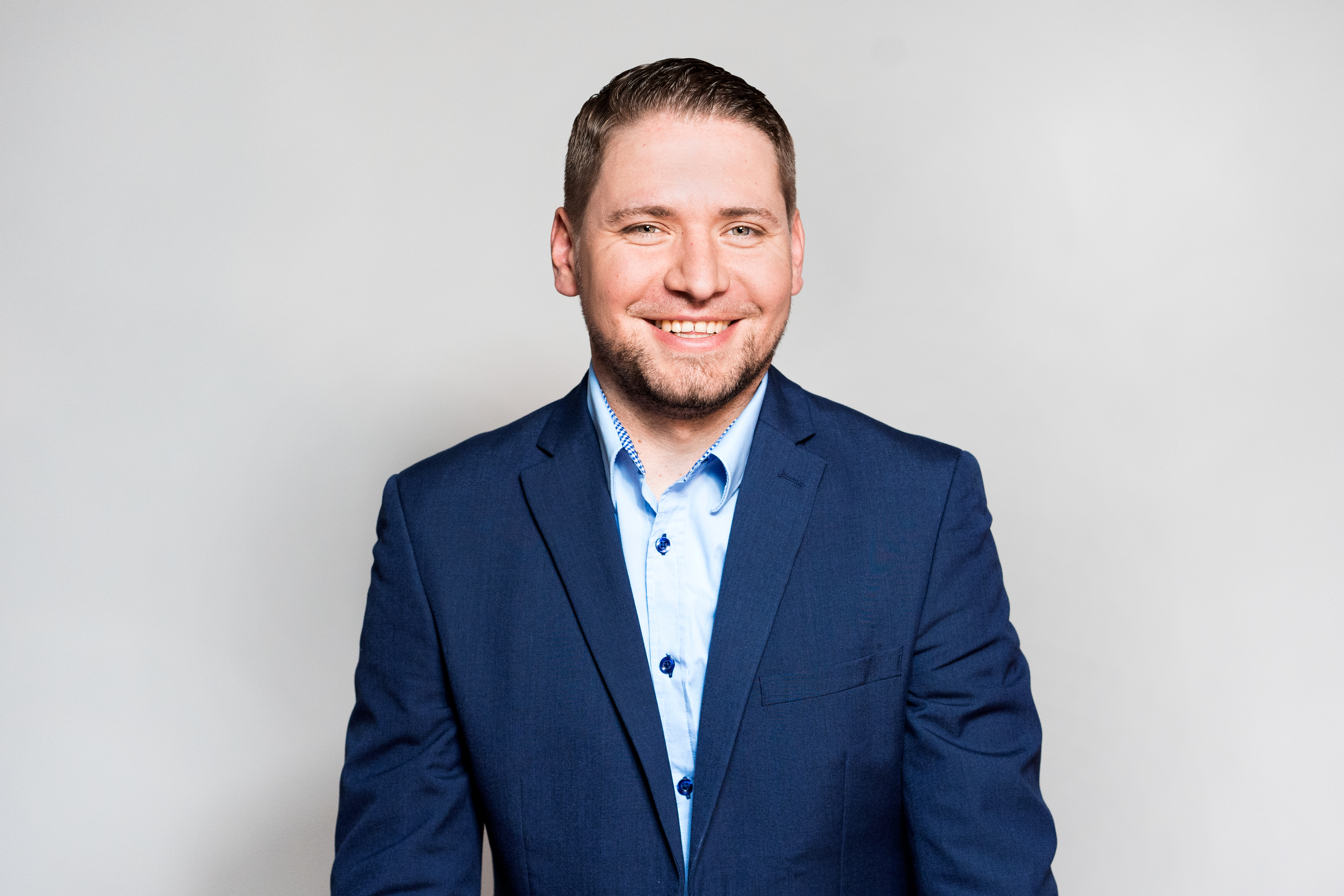
- Scheetz in 2019

Member of the Landtag of Brandenburg
- Incumbent
- Assumed office 25 September 2019
- Preceded by: Klaus Ness
- Constituency: Dahme-Spreewald II/Oder-Spree I

Personal details
- Born: 15 January 1986 (age 40)
- Party: Social Democratic Party (since 2003)

Ludwig Scheetz (born 15 January 1986) is a German politician serving as a member of the Landtag of Brandenburg since 2019. He has served as chairman of the Social Democratic Party in Königs Wusterhausen since 2017.
