= Elke Breitenbach =

German politician (born 1961)

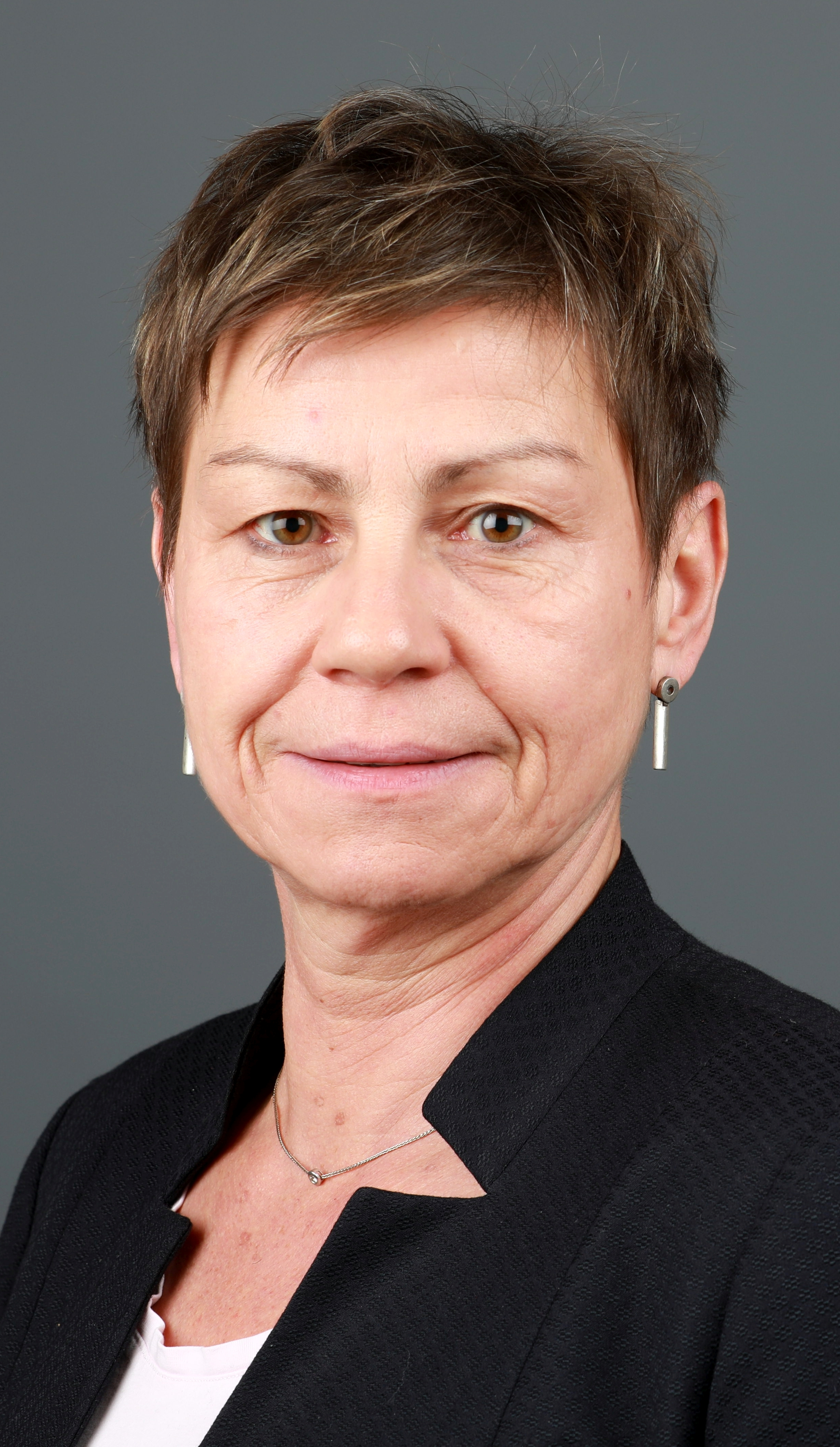
- Breitenbach in 2017

Senator for Integration, Labour and Social Affairs of Berlin
- In office 8 December 2016 – 21 December 2021
- Governing Mayor: Michael Müller
- Preceded by: Dilek Kolat (Integration and Labour); Mario Czaja (Social Affairs)
- Succeeded by: Katja Kipping

Member of the Abgeordnetenhaus of Berlin
- Incumbent
- Assumed office 4 November 2021
- In office January 2003 – 31 January 2017
- Preceded by: Thomas Flierl
- Succeeded by: Gabriele Gottwald

Personal details
- Born: Elke Breitenbach; 30 March 1961 (age 65) Frankfurt, Hesse, West Germany
- Party: Independent
- Spouse: Thomas Nord
- Education: Free University of Berlin

Elke Breitenbach (born 8 December 1961 in Frankfurt) is a German politician who served as Senator for Integration, Labour and Social Affairs in the Berlin state government from 2016 to 2021. She previously sat as a member of the Abgeordnetenhaus of Berlin from 2003 to 2017. Currently sitting as an independent, she was a member of Die Linke until 2024.

== Early career and personal life ==
From 1976 to 1981, Breitenbach attended vocational school in Obertshausen in the field of social pedagogy, graduating and earning her Abitur in Babenhausen. She then studied political science at the Free University of Berlin from 1981 to 1989 and graduated with a diploma.

After completing her studies, she worked from 1989 to 1991 as a research assistant at Technische Universität Berlin in the project "Cooperation between vocational schools and organizations involved in trade union youth work in Berlin and Herford". She then worked from 1992 to 1997, as a trade union secretary in the Trade, Banking and Insurance Union (HBV) in the areas of women, youth, and vocational training. After leaving this position, she relied on unemployment benefits.

In 1998–99 she worked as a historian at the Sachsenhausen Memorial, and from 1999 to 2002 was a consultant for social security systems for the Bundestag faction of the Party of Democratic Socialism (PDS). In 2002–03, she worked in the Senate of Berlin and was personal assistant to Senator for Health, Social Affairs, and Consumer Protection Heidi Knake-Werner.

Breitenbach is married to Left politician Thomas Nord.

=== Political career ===
Breitenbach joined the Party of Democratic Socialism in 2000. In January 2003, she replaced Thomas Flierl as a member of the Abgeordnetenhaus of Berlin. The same year, she was elected to the party executive of the PDS, which she served a member of until the party's dissolution. At the inaugural congress of The Left in June 2007, she was elected to the party executive and served until the next year. From 2012 to 2016, she was also deputy state chairwoman of the Berlin branch of the party. Breitenbach was re-elected to the Abgeordnetenhaus of Berlin in 2006, 2011, and 2016.

After the 2016 election, The Left joined a coalition government with the Social Democratic Party (SPD) and Greens. Breitenbach was appointed Senator for Integration, Labour and Social Affairs, and took office on 8 December. She also became a deputy member of the German Bundesrat representing Berlin on 13 December. She resigned her seat in the Abgeordnetenhaus on 31 January 2017 and was succeeded by Gabriele Gottwald.

On 16 December 2019, Breitenbach signed an agreement to improve the compensation for underperformance which allows "inclusive firms" to hire employees with disabilities. For example, building cleaning can be fully remunerated at the same rate, even if the employees may not be able to provide the same services. She also organized Germany's first census of homeless people in January 2020 under the name "Night of Solidarity". The census involved 2,600 volunteers traveling pre-determined routes to gather information and survey those willing to talk. The data gathered was to be used to formulate strategies to assist the homeless, and determine where aid needs to be targeted. The census counted 1,976 homeless people in the city, of which about half slept in shelters, 807 resided in public spaces, and 158 on public transport, among other places. Breitenbach voiced her hope that other cities across Germany would follow Berlin's example and conduct their own censuses of the homeless.

After the 2021 Berlin state election, Breitenbach announced her retirement from the Senate. The Left nominated the former federal co-leader Katja Kipping as her successor. Breitenbach left office with the swearing-in of the Giffey senate on 21 December 2021. She left Die Linke alongside four others in 2024 due to the party's stance on Israel.

== Social engagement ==
As part of the Berlin state admissions program for Syrian refugees, Elke Breitenbach is guarantor for a 71-year-old woman cared for by the non-profit organization Flüchtlingspaten Syria. In 2018 she was also the patron of the 4th Federal Conference of Street Children.
