= Kathleen Muxel =

German politician (1971–2026)

Member of the Landtag of Brandenburg
- In office 25 September 2019 – 6 January 2026
- Constituency: Oder-Spree II (2019–2024)

Personal details
- Born: 1971 West Berlin (now Berlin, Germany)
- Died: 6 January 2026 (aged 54) Berlin, Germany
- Party: AfD
- Spouse: Rainer Galla
- Occupation: Interior designer

Kathleen Muxel (1971 – 6 January 2026) was a German politician. A member of the Alternative for Germany, she served in the Landtag of Brandenburg from 2019 to 2026.

Muxel died on 6 January 2026, at the age of 54.
