= Martin Patzelt =

German politician (born 1947)

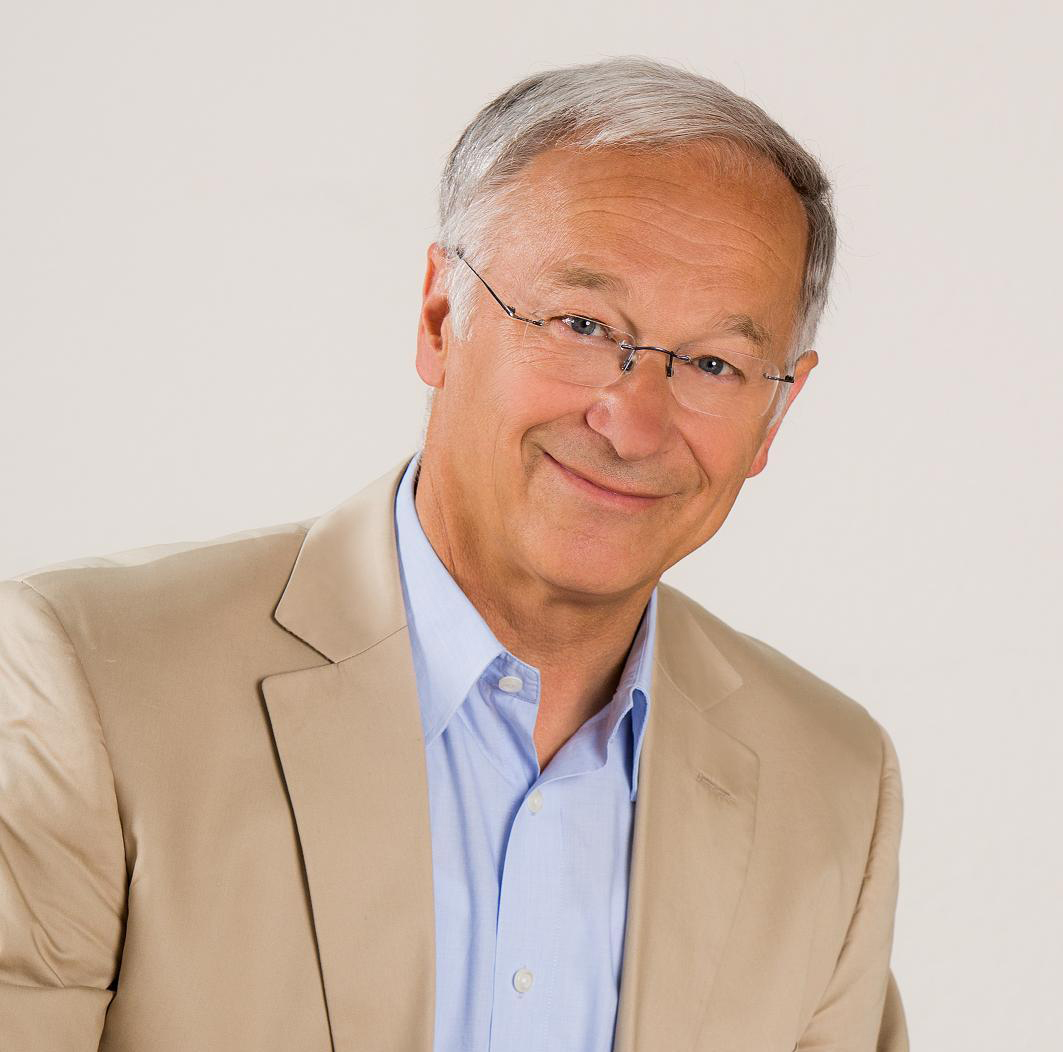
- Patzelt in 2013

Member of the Bundestag; for Frankfurt (Oder) – Oder-Spree
- In office 22 October 2013 – 26 October 2021
- Preceded by: Thomas Nord
- Succeeded by: Mathias Papendieck

Mayor of Frankfurt (Oder)
- In office 6 May 2002 – 6 May 2010
- Preceded by: Wolfgang Pohl
- Succeeded by: Martin Wilke

Personal details
- Born: 23 July 1947 (age 79) Frankfurt (Oder), East Germany
- Party: Christian Democratic Union
- Children: 5

Martin Patzelt (born 23 July 1947) is a German politician of the Christian Democratic Union (CDU) who served as a member of the Bundestag from the state of Brandenburg from 2013 until 2021.

== Political career ==
Patzelt first became a member of the Bundestag in the 2013 German federal election. Throughout his time in parliament, he was a member of the Committee on Human Rights and Humanitarian Aid and the Committee on Family, Senior Citizens, Women and Youth. He attracted attention for taking two Eritrean refugees into his home in the wake of the 2015 European migrant crisis.

Following the 2017 elections, Patzelt announced that he would not stand in the 2021 elections but instead resign from active politics by the end of the parliamentary term.

== Political positions ==
In June 2017, Patzelt voted against Germany's introduction of same-sex marriage.

Ahead of the Christian Democrats’ leadership election in 2018, Patzelt publicly opposed Friedrich Merz’s candidacy to succeed Angela Merkel as the party’s chair. In 2019, he joined 14 members of his parliamentary group who, in an open letter, called for the party to rally around Merkel and party chairwoman Annegret Kramp-Karrenbauer amid criticism voiced by Merz and Roland Koch.

In September 2020, Patzelt was one of 15 members of his parliamentary group who joined Norbert Röttgen in writing an open letter to Minister of the Interior Horst Seehofer which called on Germany and other EU counties to take in 5000 immigrants who were left without shelter after fires gutted the overcrowded Mória Reception and Identification Centre on the Greek island of Lesbos.
