= Mary Khan-Hohloch =

German politician

Mary Khan-Hohloch MEP
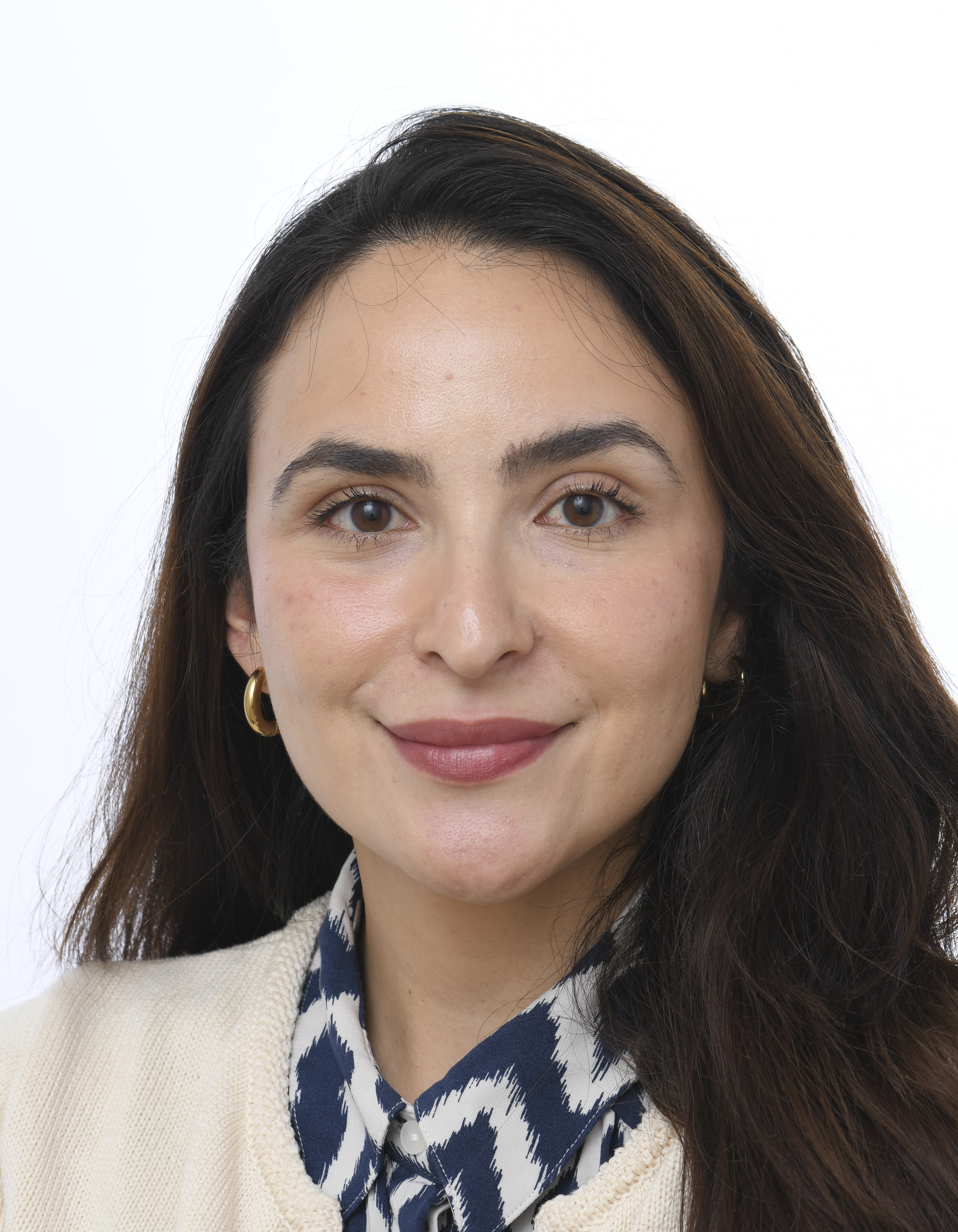
- Official portrait, 2024

Member of the European Parliament for Germany
- Incumbent
- Assumed office 16 July 2024

Personal details
- Born: Mary Fatima Khan; 25 June 1994 (age 31) Frankfurt, Germany
- Citizenship: Germany; Pakistan
- Party: AfD (since 2016)
- Spouse: Dennis Hohloch (m. 2019)
- Children: 1
- Occupation: Freelancer • Politician

Mary Fatima Khan-Hohloch (born Khan; 25 June 1994) is a German politician of the Alternative for Germany (AfD). She has served as a Member of the European Parliament (MEP) since 16 July 2024.

== Early life and background ==
Khan-Hohloch was born in Frankfurt to a Pakistani father and a German mother. Her father, Zahid Khan, emigrated from Lahore, Pakistan, to Germany in 1989.

According to reporting, her upbringing combined influences from both her Pakistani heritage and German environment; her mother was politically aligned with the Social Democratic Party of Germany (SPD).

== Education and professional career ==
Between 2019 and 2023, Khan-Hohloch studied for a Bachelor of Arts in Religious Studies and Public Law.

From 2020 to 2024, she worked as a freelancer in the media sector.

== Political career ==
=== Early involvement ===
Khan-Hohloch joined the AfD in 2016. She was initially active in the party’s Hesse branch, where she served as a local chairwoman in Rodgau and held positions in the Offenbach-Land district association.

She also held roles within the party’s youth organization, the Young Alternative for Germany (Junge Alternative), including serving as deputy federal spokesperson from 2018 to 2022 and previously as deputy state spokesperson in Hesse. Additionally, she was a member of the AfD state executive committee in Hesse.

At the municipal level, she worked as managing director of the AfD parliamentary group in the Rodgau city council.

=== European Parliament candidacy and controversies ===
In 2023, Khan-Hohloch was elected to 14th place on the AfD list for the 2024 European Parliament election. Her candidacy drew attention due to her migration background and her political positions on immigration, which she defended during the party’s nomination convention.

Her nomination was also accompanied by internal party disputes. Critics within the AfD questioned her qualifications and alleged inaccuracies in her curriculum vitae, particularly regarding her academic qualifications and professional experience.

These issues formed part of a broader internal controversy in the AfD referred to in media coverage as a “Hochstapleraffäre” (impostor scandal), involving multiple candidates accused of embellishing their biographies.

An internal party review concluded that there were inaccuracies in the candidates’ self-descriptions but did not find sufficient evidence of intentional deception.

Khan-Hohloch was nevertheless allowed to remain on the party list and subsequently secured a seat in the European Parliament.

=== Member of the European Parliament ===
Following the 2024 European elections, Khan-Hohloch took office as an MEP on 16 July 2024.

Her political positions have included criticism of immigration policies and calls for stronger national control over border policy within the European Union.

== Party disciplinary measures ==
In 2024, Khan-Hohloch was subject to internal disciplinary measures within the AfD. Following the controversy surrounding her biography, she was temporarily barred from holding party offices for a period of two years.

== Personal life ==
Since 2019, Khan-Hohloch has been married to Dennis Hohloch, a politician and member of the AfD in the Landtag of Brandenburg. The couple have one daughter.
