= Dennis Hohloch =

German politician (born 1991)

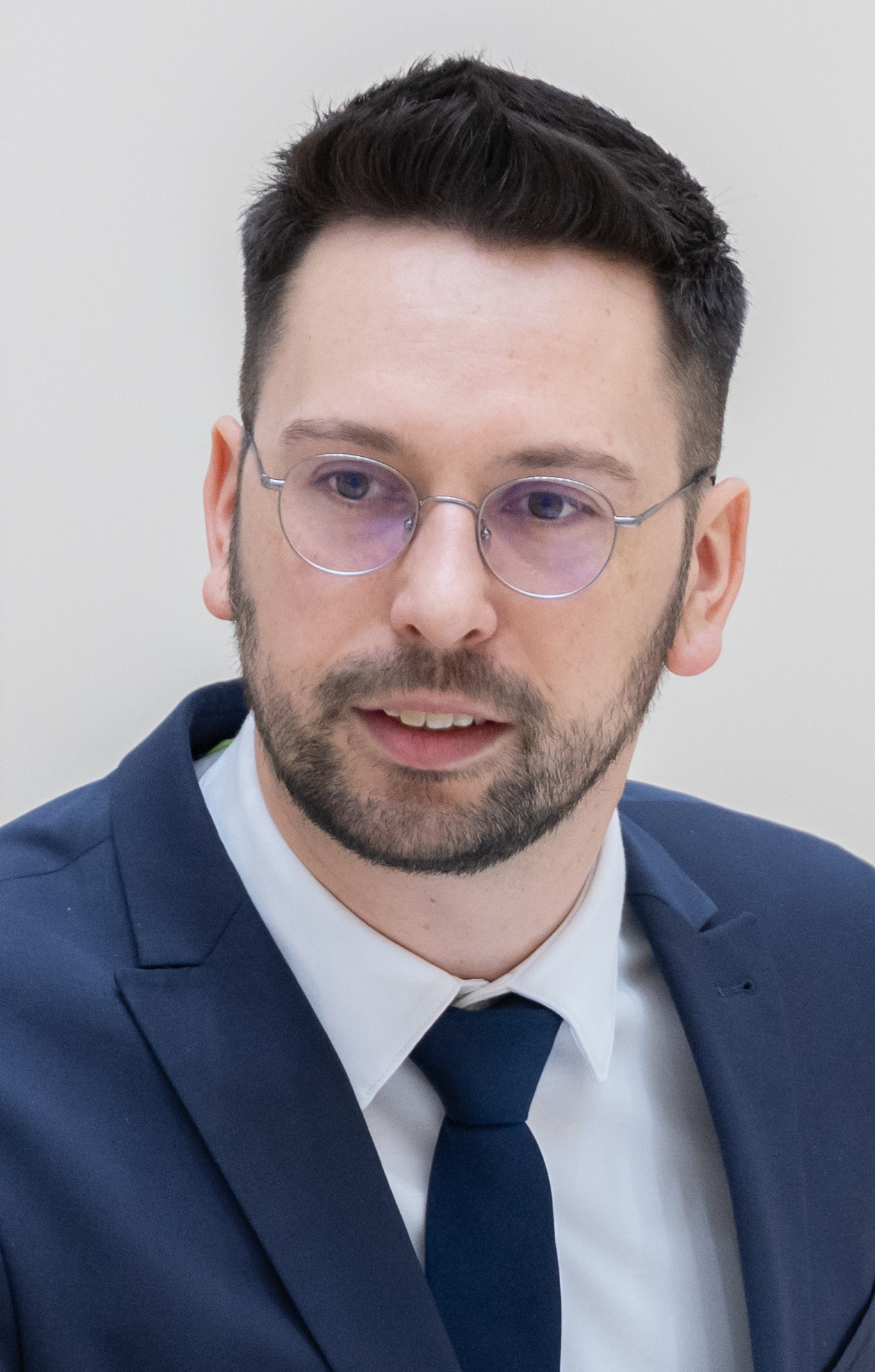
- Hohloch in 2025

Member of the Landtag of Brandenburg
- Incumbent
- Assumed office 25 September 2019
- Constituency: Oder-Spree II (2024–present)

Personal details
- Born: 19 March 1989 (age 37)
- Party: Alternative for Germany (since 2014)
- Spouse: Mary Khan-Hohloch (m. 2019)

Dennis Hohloch (born 1989) is a right wing extremist German politician serving as a member of the Landtag of Brandenburg since 2019. He has served as federal secretary of the Alternative for Germany since 2022. He has been married to Mary Khan-Hohloch since 2019.
