= Jörg Vogelsänger =

German politician (born 1964)

Jörg Vogelsänger MdL
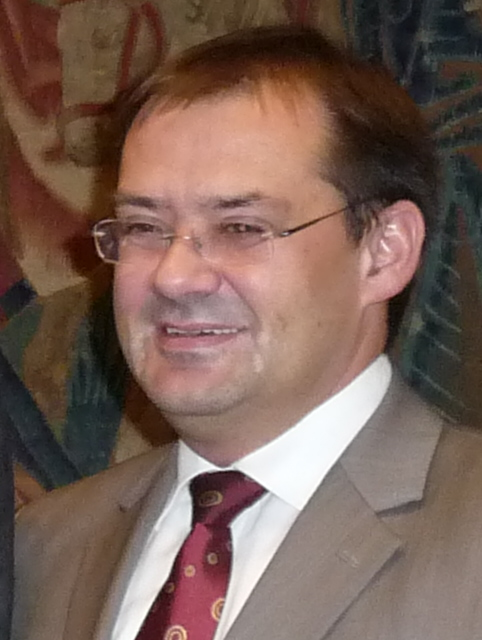
- Vogelsänger in 2012

Minister for Rural Development, Environment, and Agriculture of Brandenburg (Note: Minister for Infrastructure and Agriculture (2010–2014))
- In office 25 February 2010 – 20 November 2019
- Minister-President: Matthias Platzeck; Dietmar Woidke
- Preceded by: Jutta Lieske
- Succeeded by: Axel Vogel

Member of the Landtag of Brandenburg
- Incumbent
- Assumed office 8 October 2014
- Preceded by: Matthias Loehr
- Constituency: Märkisch-Oderland I/Oder-Spree IV
- In office 11 October 1994 – 30 September 2002
- Preceded by: Constituency established
- Succeeded by: Heidrun Förster
- Constituency: Oder-Spree I

Member of the Bundestag; for Frankfurt (Oder) – Oder-Spree
- In office 17 October 2002 – 27 October 2009
- Preceded by: Winfried Mante
- Succeeded by: Thomas Nord

Personal details
- Born: 17 May 1964 (age 62) Woltersdorf, East Germany
- Party: Social Democratic (since 1990)
- Children: 2
- Education: TU Dresden

Jörg Vogelsänger (born 17 May 1964) is a German politician. He has been a member of the Landtag of Brandenburg since 2014, having previously served from 1994 to 2002. From 2010 to 2014, he served as minister of infrastructure and agriculture of Brandenburg. From 2014 to 2019, he served as minister of rural development, environment and agriculture of Brandenburg. From 2002 to 2009, he was a member of the Bundestag.
