= Axel Henschke =

German politician (born 1952)

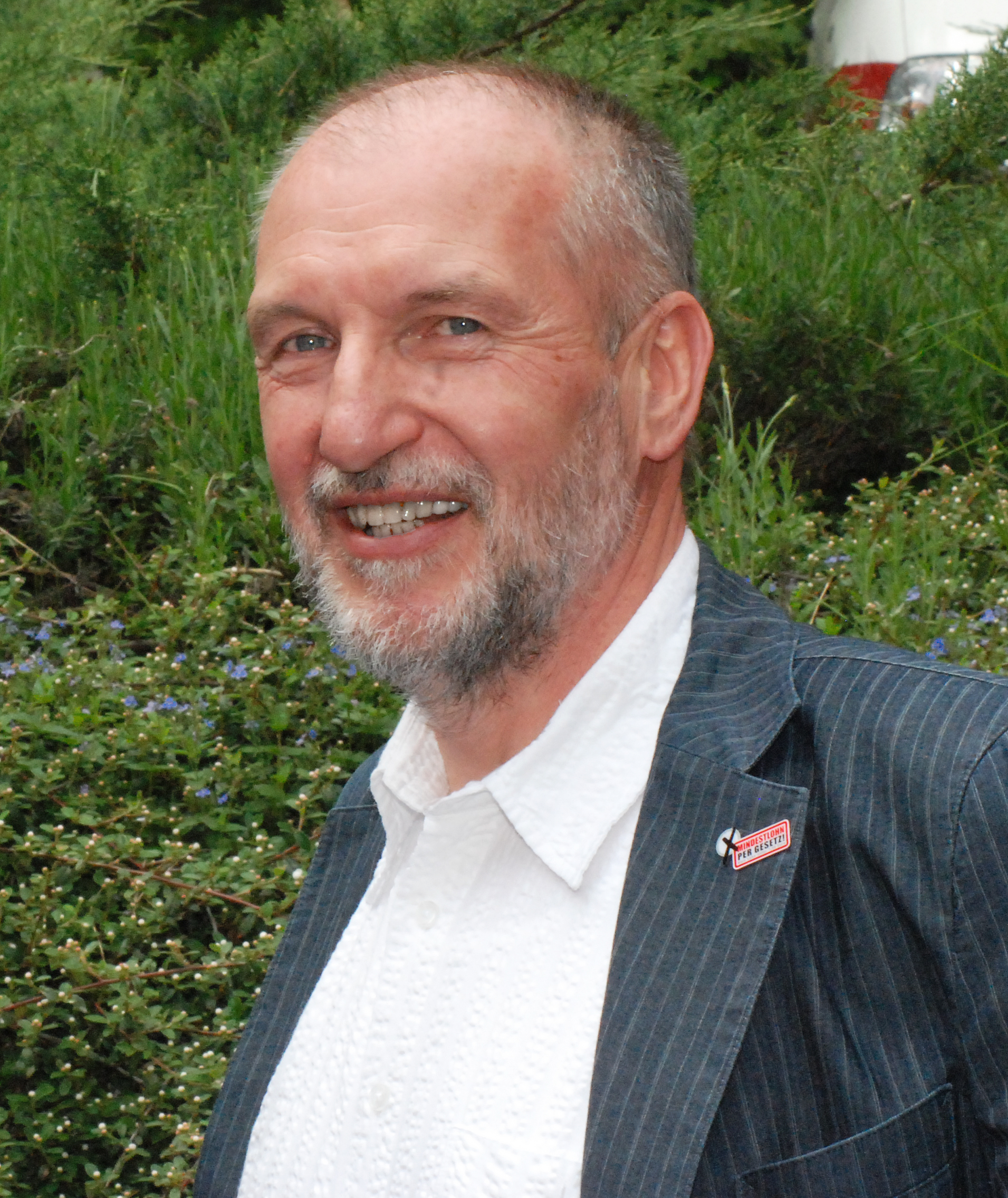
- Henschke in 2009

Member of the Landtag of Brandenburg for Frankfurt (Oder)
- In office 21 October 2009 – 8 October 2014
- Preceded by: Frank Hammer
- Succeeded by: René Wilke

Second Secretary of the Socialist Unity Party in Bezirk Frankfurt
- In office 15 November 1989 – 8 December 1989
- First Secretary: Bernd Meier
- Preceded by: Günter Grell
- Succeeded by: Position abolished

Personal details
- Born: Axel Henschke; 15 May 1952 (age 74) Frankfurt (Oder), State of Brandenburg, East Germany (now Brandenburg, Germany)
- Party: The Left (2007–)
- Other political affiliations: Party of Democratic Socialism (1989–2007); Socialist Unity Party (1972–1989)
- Education: Jugendhochschule „Wilhelm Pieck“; "Karl Marx" Party Academy (Dipl.-Ges.-Wiss.)
- Occupation: Politician; Party Functionary; Stasi Officer; Mechatronic Engineer
- Central institution membership: 1985–1989: Member, FDJ Central Council; Other offices held: 1985–1989: First Secretary, Free German Youth in Bezirk Frankfurt; 1984–1985: Second Secretary, Free German Youth in Bezirk Frankfurt

Axel Henschke (born 15 May 1952) is a former German Stasi officer, politician and party functionary of the Socialist Unity Party (SED) and its successors, the Party of Democratic Socialism (PDS) and The Left.

Originally aspiring to be a full-time Stasi officer, Henschke left due to a prolonged illness and became a full-time Free German Youth (FDJ) functionary, though remaining an unofficial Stasi informant. He notably served as First Secretary of the Bezirk Frankfurt (Oder) FDJ in the 1980s and briefly as Second Secretary of the Bezirk Frankfurt (Oder) SED during the Peaceful Revolution.

Henschke remained politically active even after German reunification, serving on the Frankfurt (Oder) City Council and being elected to the Landtag of Brandenburg. He retired from active politics in 2014.

== Life and career ==
=== Early career ===
Henschke completed a vocational training with Abitur (university entrance qualification) from 1968 to 1971 to become a BMSR mechanic at the Eisenhüttenkombinat Ost in Eisenhüttenstadt.

=== Stasi career officer ===
In 1971, he committed in writing to a ten-year tenure as a full-time employee of the Ministry for State Security (MfS) in Bezirk Frankfurt (Oder). There, as a career officer, he was responsible, among other tasks, for guarding GDR deserters in the Frankfurt (Oder) Stasi prison.

Henschke joined the ruling Socialist Unity Party (SED) in 1972.

Following a prolonged illness in 1972, Henschke's fitness for service was downgraded. As a result, the planned delegation for university studies by the Stasi was no longer considered. Since the prospect of a university placement was a significant reason for Henschke's commitment to full-time work with the Stasi, he requested in writing to be released from his duties. Historians interpret his requests as a sign of disillusionment with the Stasi. His superiors tried to dissuade him from his decision, but Henschke insisted, and he was discharged on 31 August 1973.

=== Free German Youth career ===
From 1973, Henschke worked as a air conditioning technician at the semiconductor plant in Frankfurt (Oder), before undergoing a one-year course for youth functionaries from 1975 to 1976 FDJ Youth Academy "Wilhelm Pieck" at the Bogensee. Afterward, on 1 September 1976, Henschke became a full-time FDJ secretary at the vocational school of the semiconductor plant. Until 1978, he held various full-time positions in the FDJ at the semiconductor plant and in the Frankfurt (Oder) City FDJ.

According to records from the Stasi Records Agency, on 24 March 1977, Henschke committed to unofficial collaboration with the Stasi as a Societal Security Collaborator (GMS), initially for Department XVIII of the Bezirk Frankfurt (Oder) Stasi. This department was responsible for the “security and control of the national economy, including foreign trade and the FDGB.” On 9 December 1977, during a meeting with the GMS, Henschke was transferred to Department VIII, as he had moved to the Frankfurt (Oder) City FDJ, which did not fall under the jurisdiction of Department XVIII. Department VIII was responsible for “observation, investigation, and arrest of individuals, as well as securing transit routes” – essentially, the investigative department of the Stasi. On 29 March 1978, Henschke signed a handwritten commitment to work with the Stasi as a GMS under the code name "Ingo Köhler."

His work as an unofficial collaborator ended on 23 October 1978, due to his enrollment at the SED's "Karl Marx" Party Academy in Berlin in September 1978, which was equivalent to full-time employment with the SED. Due to the strict subordination of the Stasi under the SED, unofficial collaboration with SED cadres was typically excluded. Henschke graduated in 1981 with a diploma in social sciences (Dipl.-Ges.-Wiss.).

Afterward, he held various full-time positions in the Bezirk Frankfurt (Oder) FDJ Secretariat. In 1984, he became Second Secretary, additionally once again committing to working as an unofficial GMS Stasi collaborator. In 1985, he rose to First Secretary of the Bezirk Frankfurt (Oder) FDJ, also joining the Central Council of the FDJ. As FDJ First Secretary, he served as statutory member of the Bezirk Frankfurt (Oder) SED Secretariat, which again meant the end of his Stasi collaboration. From 1986 to 1989, he additionally was a member of the Bezirk Frankfurt (Oder) legislature.

=== Peaceful Revolution ===
During the Wende, on 15 November 1989, Henschke was elected Second Secretary of the Bezirk Frankfurt (Oder) SED, serving until December.

=== Reunified Germany ===
After the fall of the Berlin Wall and the Peaceful Revolution in the DDR, Henschke initially worked as a managing director of a GBT GmbH at the semiconductor plant in 1990, before becoming unemployed that same year. In 1991, he became self-employed with a courier service, which he ran until 1996. From 1994 to 2009, he worked as an assistant to members of the Landtag of Brandenburg and Bundestag for his party.

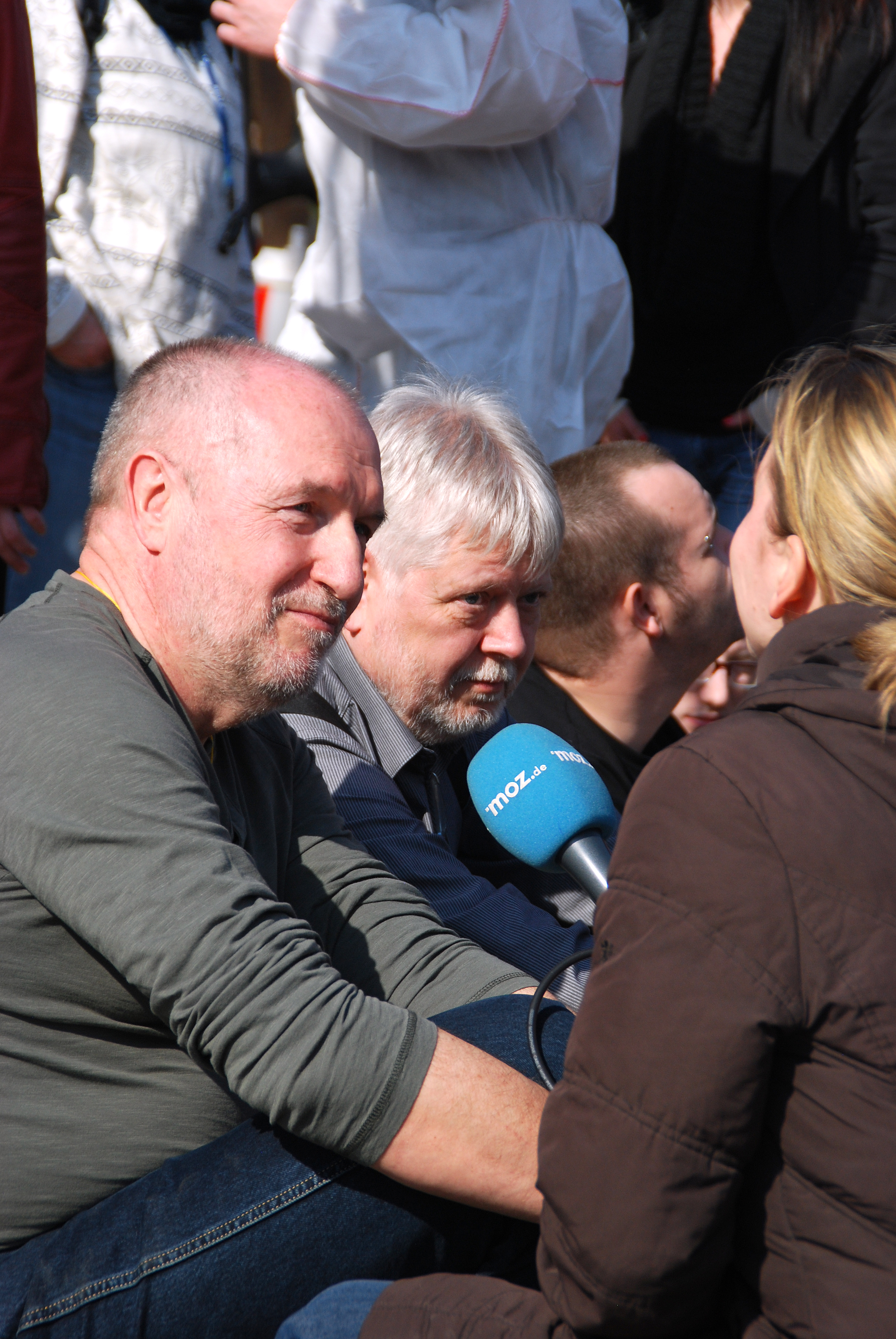
Henschke (left) giving an interview at a counter-protest against a Neo-Nazi march in March 2012.

Since 1998, he has been a member of the Frankfurt (Oder) City Council. In 2002, Henschke unsuccessfully ran for mayor as the candidate of the electoral alliance "Group 2002" in Frankfurt (Oder), narrowly losing to Martin Patzelt of the Christian Democratic Union (CDU). Additionally, he was deputy state chairman from 2003 to 2005 and has been a member of his party's state executive committee since 2008.

In the 2009 Brandenburg state election, Henschke was directly elected to the Landtag of Brandenburg in the Frankfurt (Oder) constituency with 39% of the vote. The Left swept most of eastern Brandenburg that year. In the state parliament, he served as a member of the committees for environment, health, and consumer protection and the economic committee, as well as his faction's spokesperson for urban development, construction, and housing policy. He did not run for reelection in 2014.

Henschke's extensive Stasi involvement stirred controversy in his runs for public office, especially during his mayoral run and in the aftermath of the 2009 state election, where the Social Democratic Party (SPD) entered coalition talks with The Left. Henschke himself expressed regret for his Stasi involvement, stating "I was a perpetrator, no rain can wash me clean of that." in 2002 and asking for forgiveness.

=== Personal life ===
Henschke is married and has two children.
