= Thomas Nord =

German politician (born 1957)

- Nord in 2014

Member of the Bundestag; from Brandenburg
- In office 27 October 2009 – 26 October 2021
- Preceded by: Jörg Vogelsänger
- Succeeded by: Multi-member district
- Constituency: Frankfurt (Oder) – Oder-Spree (2009–2013); State list (2013–2021)

Personal details
- Born: 19 October 1957 (age 68) East Berlin, East Germany
- Party: Die Linke (since 2007)
- Other political affiliations: SED (1976–1989); PDS (1989–2007)
- Spouse: Elke Breitenbach
- Children: 2

Thomas Nord (born 19 October 1957) is a German politician (Die Linke) and Member of the German Federal Parliament.

From 2005 to 2012 he was Chairman of Die Linke in Brandenburg (Partei des Demokratischen Sozialismus PDS prior to 2007). Nord has been a Member of the Federal German Parliament since 2009, a member of the party Executive since 2012 and Federal Treasurer since May 2014. Nord was an Informant of the Stasi.

== Life ==
Thomas Nord grew up in East Berlin and, after High School, completed an apprenticeship as a machinery and plant fitter. Between 1976 and 1980 he served in the People’s Navy of the GDR as a Sergeant. He then spent four years as a youth club leader in Berlin Prenzlauer Berg and studied Cultural Studies at the College Martin Andersen Nexo. From 1984, Nord worked full-time at the Free German Youth (FDJ) as Secretary for Culture and Sport, and later as second secretary of the FDJ district headquarters in Berlin Prenzlauer Berg. After the events of 1989, Thomas Nord became district chairman of the PDS in Prenzlauer Berg and in 1991 country managing director of the party in Berlin. The following year he ended his full-time employment with the PDS and became a clerk in a printing company. He was an honorary deputy chairman of the Berlin PDS in 1993. He organized the 1994 election of Stefan Heym, on whose staff he served from 1995. After Heym's left parliament Nord was an employee of the PDS parliamentary group. From 1999 to 2002 he worked for member of the Bundestag Wolfgang Gehrcke. After the electoral defeat of the PDS in 2002 he was Manager of the PDS in Brandenburg and Chairman since 2005. In 2009 he ran for the German Bundestag in constituency 63, which he won with 32.3% of the vote. In the federal elections in 2013 Nord lost his direct mandate but was elected on the regional list Brandenburg in the 18th Bundestag.

== Political career ==
Thomas Nord was since 1976 a member of the SED, and practiced until 1984 volunteer functions. In the same year his appointment was followed in the FDJ district leadership, as full-time functionary of the Youth League and the Party. The political changes in 1989 led him to a dispute with his party communist past. He broke with Stalinism and started an open and public dealing with his biography and his Engagement in the PDS.

In 1998 Nord worked out with several Party Members the Erfurt Declaration - standing up for a different policy. 1999 began Nord his Engagement in Brandenburg. After honorary functions in the Ostprignitz he was 2003 elected country manager of the PDS and started a party reform. He was regional chairman and campaign manager of his party in 2005. Nord was a member of the delegation of his party in the exploratory talks with the SPD after the state elections 2004, in 2009 he served as state chairman of the negotiating delegation from the Left to the development of the coalition agreement with the SPD Brandenburg. Together with Kerstin Kaiser, Matthias Platzeck and Günter Baaske he signed the coalition agreement for the red-red coalition. On the Göttingen Congress 2012 Nord was elected to the executive committee. At the Berlin Congress of 2014 he was elected treasurer of the party. In the spring of 2014 he was again elected to the State Executive Committee of DIE LINKE Brandenburg.

== Member of German Parliament ==
Nord was the directly elected deputy of constituency 63 in 17th Legislature (2009–2013) of the German Parliament. He was a member of the Committee on the affairs of the European Union, and a substitute member of the Committee for Culture and Media and the Defence Committee. He was deputy chairman of the German-Polish and German-French Parliamentary Friendship Groups for DIE LINKE. In the 18th Legislature (2013–Present) he is a member of the Committee of Economy and Energy, substitute member of the Committee on the Affairs of the European Union and a member of the Subcommittee on Regional Economic Policy. He is chairman of the German-Polish Parliamentary Group and Deputy Chairman of the German-French Parliamentary Friendship Group. He is also a national spokesperson for the Group of Brandenburger Deputies of DIE LINKE.

== Unofficial employee of GDR Ministry of State Security (MfS) ==
In March 1990 Thomas Nord revealed himself as an informer of the Ministry of State Security in connection with the local elections in Berlin. "I was by political conviction an unofficial member of the MfS." Nord sees it today as a personal failure. "Since that time I pointed at each running for office or mandate on this part of my biography." Nord’s past has been repeatedly examined critically by the media in the course of his political career.

On 25 February 2010, after extra discussion after a parliamentary session CDU/CSU requested a review process referred to in point 3 of the "arrangement for carrying out the directives issued pursuant §44c ABGG". SPD and FDP joined the request, while the Greens cast doubt on the need for the process. The hearing on Thomas Nord occurred on 24 February 2011. On 30 June 2011, the Committee for the Scrutiny of Elections, Immunity and the Rules of Procedure (AfW) completed the review process. The review found a proven activity of the Member of Parliament for the MfS. The report includes: Nord was first contacted during his time at the People's Navy and in 1984 was enlisted by the Ministry of State Security. Official documents show that in 1977 the MfS became aware of Mr. Nord during his four-year military service in the People's Navy of the GDR from 1976 to 1980. According to a memorandum of a lieutenant in 1982, Nord was approached from September 1978 to October 1980. Out of political conviction he volunteered a declaration of commitment to the MfS, working under the pseudonym Marc Schindler.

As a youth club leader in Berlin Prenzlauer Berg, he reported on young people and colleagues who were critical of the GDR. According to his IM-flow Record, by resolution of 28 February 1984 Mr. Nord was obliged to become a GMS (Employee of MfS) and remained so until the political changes in the GDR in 1989. The report of the AfW and Nord himself did not exclude that his actions injured others. In the investigation of the committee no concrete evidence was found that in his work for the MfS Thomas Nord had directly injured others.

== Personal life ==
Thomas Nord has two daughters and is married with the social minister of Berlin Elke Breitenbach.
