= René Wilke =

German politician

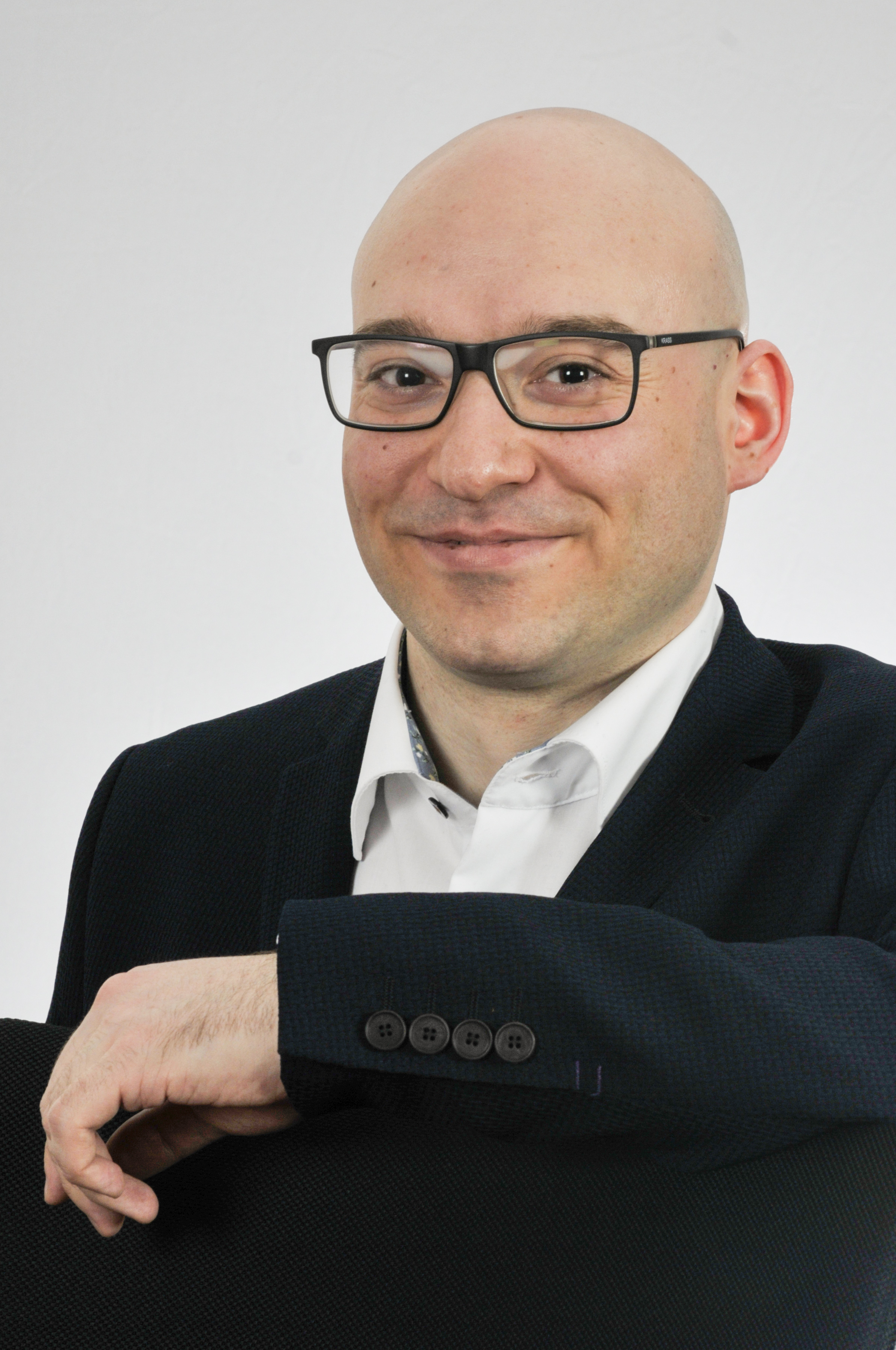

Minister of Health and Social Affairs of the state of Brandenburg
- Incumbent
- Assumed office 18 March 2026
- Preceded by: Britta Müller

Minister of Interior of the state of Brandenburg
- In office 22 May 2025 – 18 March 2026
- Preceded by: Katrin Lange
- Succeeded by: Jan Redmann

Member of the Landtag of Brandenburg for Frankfurt (Oder)
- In office 8 October 2014 – 6 May 2018
- Preceded by: Axel Henschke
- Succeeded by: Carsten Preuß

Personal details
- Born: 30 June 1984 (age 42) Frankfurt (Oder), East Germany
- Party: SPD
- Education: Viadrina European University

René Wilke (born 30 June 1984) is a German politician (SPD), serving as minister of interior of the state of Brandenburg until March 18, 2026, and serving as minister of health since March 18, 2026, and a former member of Brandenburg's regional parliament. 2014 he became a directly elected Member of parliament for his native Frankfurt (Oder). On 18 March 2018 he was elected Oberbürgermeister (Lord Mayor) of Frankfurt (Oder). With his inauguration on 6 May 2018, Wilke became the youngest mayor in the history of Frankfurt (Oder) and the mayor of the biggest city from his party.

== Biography ==
=== Personal life ===
René Wilke was born on 30 June 1984 in Frankfurt (Oder), where he spent most of his life. After finishing High School in Frankfurt (Oder), Wilke studied at Viadrina European University and University of Hagen but did not graduate. After two apprenticeships he earned qualifications as a mediator and respectively as an office administrator.

=== Political life ===
Wilke joined the Party of Democratic Socialism (German: Partei des Demokratischen Sozialismus, PDS) in the year 2000, when he was 16 years old. Only two years later, at the age of 18, Wilke was elected party leader for the district Frankfurt (Oder). Wilke remained in this position for 12 years and hence steered the transition from PDS to DIE LINKE in Frankfurt before he decided not to seek re-election for this office in 2014. Wilke worked amongst others, for the Rosa Luxemburg Foundation (German: Rosa-Luxemburg Stiftung, RLS) and members of parliament like Helmut Scholz or Lothar Bisky.

In 2014 Wilke was elected for Frankfurt (Oder)'s city council. He became the speaker of his caucus and chaired, in addition, the committee for Urban Development and Economics (Ausschuss für Stadtentwicklung, Wirtschaft, Arbeit, Verkehr und Umwelt). in the constituency of Frankfurt (Oder) as a directly elected member of parliament for the Landtag of Brandenburg. Wilke became a member of his caucus' leadership team in the Landtag, serving at the end of his tenure as a speaker for finance and deputy speaker of DIE LINKE's caucus. With assuming the office of Lord Mayor in Frankfurt (Oder), Wilke forfeits his membership in the Landtag. He was replaced by Carsten Preuß.

Wilke was running for mayor of Frankfurt (Oder) on the ticket of "Frankfurt geht Besser", an electoral pact composed of his party, the local chapter of Alliance 90/The Greens, and unaffiliated citizens of Frankfurt (Oder). His nomination occurred unanimously. In a field of five competitors, Wilke received 43.4% in the first round of elections on 4 March 2018, hence securing a spot for himself in the runoff taking place two weeks later on 18 March 2018. In the runoff, he defeated the incumbent Martin Wilke and was elected with 62.5% of the cast votes.

In July 2024, Willke announced that he would leave Die Linke, naming disagreements with certain positions of the party, especially on the Russo-Ukrainian war as the reason. In November 2025, he became a member of the Social Democratic Party of Germany.

After the resignation of Katrin Lange, he was appointed as Minister of Interior of the state of Brandenburg by Minister President Dietmar Woidke. Since March 18, 2026 he was appointed as Minister of Health of the state of Brandenburg by Minister President Dietmar Woidke.
