= Renate Adolph =

German politician (born 1954)

Renate Adolph (born 20 March 1954 in East Berlin) is a former politician for the Die Linke and its predecessors, the Socialist Unity Party of Germany (SED) and the PDS. She became a member of the party in 1976, and a local councillor in 2003.

In 2004, Adolph was elected to the Landtag of the state of Brandenburg. She resigned from the Landtag in November 2009, after she had admitted being an informer for the East German communist secret police Stasi. Against Die Linke policy, she failed to declare publicly this history.

== See also ==
- Gerlinde Stobrawa
