= Mathias Papendieck =

German politician

- Papendieck in 2021

Member of the Bundestag; for Frankfurt (Oder) – Oder-Spree
- In office 26 October 2021 – 25 March 2025
- Preceded by: Martin Patzelt
- Succeeded by: Rainer Galla

Personal details
- Born: 18 February 1982 (age 44) Rüdersdorf, East Germany
- Party: Social Democratic
- Children: 1
- Education: HTW Berlin

Mathias Papendieck (born 18 February 1982) is a German politician of the Social Democratic Party (SPD) who served as a member of the Bundestag from 2021 to 2025.

== Life and politics ==
Papendieck was born 1982 in the East German town of Rüdersdorf and was elected directly to the Bundestag in September 2021.

Within his parliamentary group, Papendieck belongs to the Parliamentary Left, a left-wing movement.
