= Gerlinde Stobrawa =

German politician (1949–2024)

Member of the Landtag of Brandenburg
- In office 1990–1994

Personal details
- Born: 23 January 1949 Altkünkendorf, Brandenburg, Allied-occupied Germany
- Died: 29 August 2024 (aged 75) Potsdam, Brandenburg, Germany
- Party: The Left
- Other political affiliations: Socialist Unity Party of Germany

Gerlinde Stobrawa (23 January 1949 – 29 August 2024) was a German politician for Die Linke and its predecessors. She was a member of the council of the Bezirk of Frankfurt (Oder) from 1984 to 1989, and completed a degree in sociology at the Parteihochschule Karl Marx of the Socialist Unity Party of Germany from 1986 to 1988. She was elected to the Landtag of the state of Brandenburg in 1990 and served as its vice president from 2005 to 2009.

The fact of Stobrawa having a past as an informer (code name: IM Marisa) for the East German secret police Stasi was public knowledge since 1991. However she resigned in November 2009 as Vice President of the Landtag when the extent of her past was revealed by the Federal Commissioner for the Stasi Records. Stobrawa argued that as part of her activities on the council of the Bezirk of Frankfurt (Oder) she met and was responsible for international delegations from a variety of countries, and that related security matters had to be monitored by the Stasi.

Stobrawa died in Potsdam, Brandenburg, on 29 August 2024, at the age of 75.

== See also ==
- Renate Adolph
