= Benjamin Filter =

German politician (born 1981)

Member of the Landtag of Brandenburg
- Incumbent
- Assumed office 17 October 2024

Personal details
- Born: 1981 (age 44–45)
- Party: Alternative for Germany (since 2013)

Benjamin Filter (born 1981) is a German politician serving as a member of the Landtag of Brandenburg since 2024. He has served as chairman of the Alternative for Germany in Dahme-Spreewald since 2022.
