= Rainer Galla =

German politician (born 1961)

Rainer Galla MdB

Member of the Bundestag; for Frankfurt (Oder) – Oder-Spree
- Incumbent
- Assumed office 25 March 2025
- Preceded by: Mathias Papendieck

Personal details
- Born: 23 September 1961 (age 64) Gelsenkirchen, West Germany
- Party: Alternative for Germany (since 2019)
- Spouse: Kathleen Muxel (died 2026)
- Children: 3

Rainer Galla (born 23 September 1961) is a German politician who was elected as a member of the Bundestag in 2025. He has served as legal advisor to the Alternative for Germany group in the Landtag of Brandenburg since 2019.
