= Wilko Möller =

German politician

Member of the Landtag of Brandenburg
- Incumbent
- Assumed office 2019

Personal details
- Born: Hanover, West-Germany (now Germany)
- Citizenship: Germany
- Party: Alternative für Deutschland
- Children: five

Wilko Möller is a German politician (AfD, formerly FDP) and member of Landtag of Brandenburg since 2019. He is member of AfD Brandenburg, which is classified as right-wing extremist by the Brandenburg Office for the Protection of the Constitution. His 2024 campaign advertisements were investigated as potentially violating German laws regarding allowable speech and eventually removed by police.

== Early life ==
Möller grew up in Hanover and later moved to Erftstadt in West-Germany. He completed training to become a merchant and in 1989 he started training to become a mid-level officer of the Bundesgrenzschutz.

He served as a police officer in Frankfurt (Oder), and in 2019 was the leader of the local chapter of the AfD. He held anti-migrant positions, claiming that the city's refugee population would eventually bring an end to "law and order".

== Political career ==
He was active in the Junge Union of the CDU, and in 2008 became a member of the Free Democratic Party. He left the party in 2012, becoming a member of AfD in 2013. One year later he became a member of the city council of Frankfurt (Oder). He ran for mayor of Frankfurt (Oder) in 2018, gaining 17% of the votes.

In 2019, Möller was elected as a direct candidate for the Brandenburg state parliament with 24.8%. From 2019 to 2024 he sat on the committees for Home Affairs, for Internal Affairs, for European Affairs, and for Legal Affairs. He ran for federal election in 2021, but lost to Mathias Papendieck. He has been very vocal in his stance against refugees as well as in support of Russia in the invasion of Ukraine.

=== 2024 campaign ===
The Frankfurt (Oder) public prosecutor's office investigated Wilko Möller on suspicion of using Nazi symbolism. The district chairwoman of Die Linke in Frankfurt, Anja Kreisel, informed the prosecutor's office about Möller's campaign poster, arguing that it shows a hidden Nazi salute. Möller responded that the raised arms were intended to evoke a rooftop, not mirrored salutes, but the party has frequently used Nazi language as well as symbols, such as Goebbels' "Lügenpresse". The site from which the stock photo was purchased, U.S.-based Depositphotos, also stated that Möller's use violated their terms as they specifically restricted use of that image to non-political purposes.

Möller was temporarily decommissioned from the police force as a result of the controversy, and police removed the posters 5 August, after the prosecutor's office declared them unconstitutional. Despite the controversy, he was re-elected to the Landtag with a count of 46.4% of the ballots cast.

== Personal life ==
Möller is married and has five children.
