= Clemens Rostock =

German politician (born 1984)

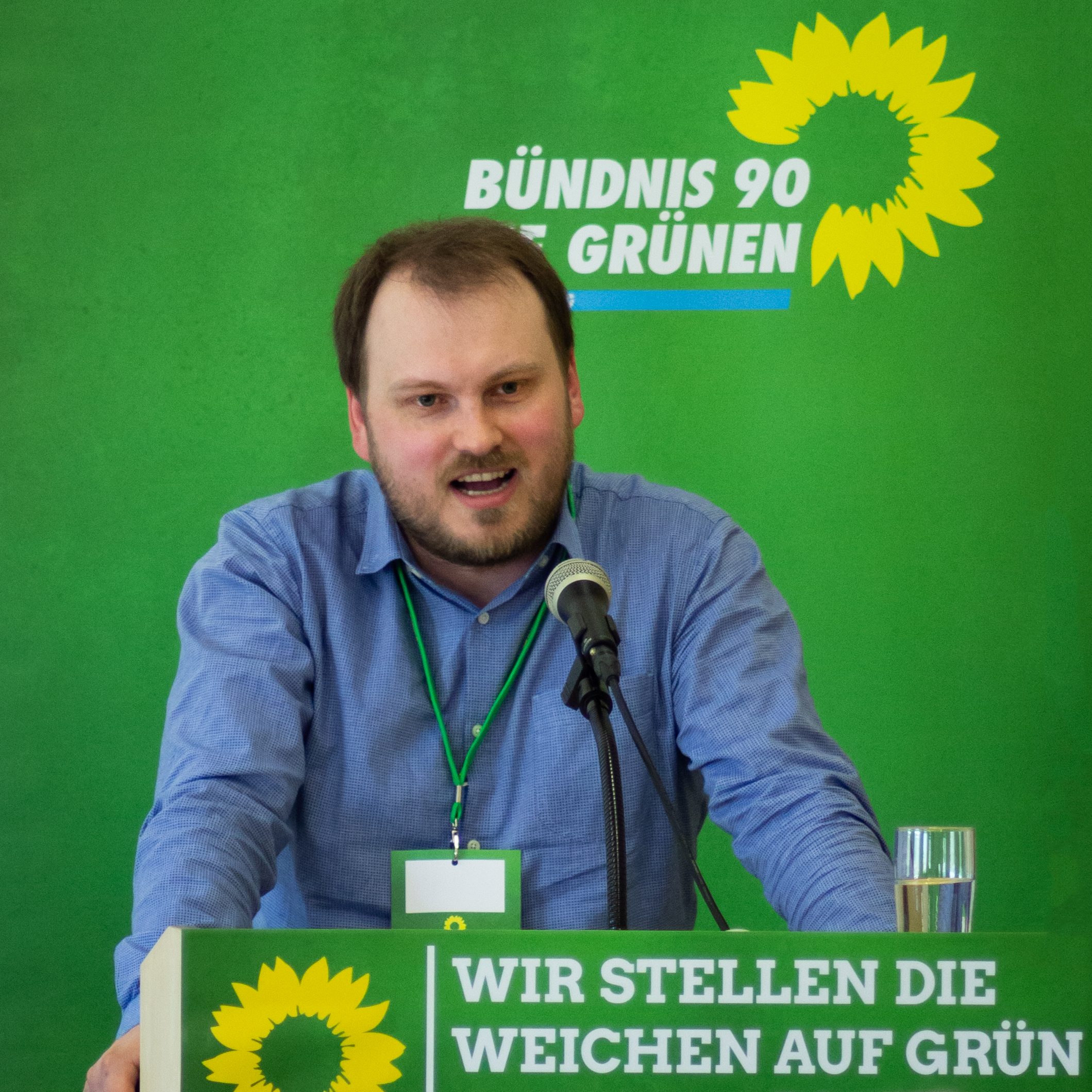
- Rostock in 2018

Member of the Landtag of Brandenburg
- In office 25 September 2019 – 17 October 2024

Personal details
- Born: 21 February 1984 (age 42)
- Party: Alliance 90/The Greens (since 2001)

Clemens Rostock (born 21 February 1984) is a German politician. He has served as co-spokesperson of Alliance 90/The Greens in Brandenburg since 2025, having previously served from 2014 to 2019. From 2019 to 2024, he was a member of the Landtag of Brandenburg.
