= Minnie F. Abrams =

American missionary to India (1859–1912)

- Abrams in a 1904 book
- Born: August 2, 1859; Lawrenceville, Outagamie County, Wisconsin, U.S.
- Died: December, 2, 1912; North India
- Education: Minnesota State University, Mankato; Chicago Training School for Home and Foreign Missions
- Occupations: Evangelist and revivalist deaconess-missionary
- Employer: Woman's Foreign Missionary Society of the Methodist Episcopal Church
- Known for: "The most prominent veteran female missionary in the holiness movement who identified with Pentecostalism"
- Notable work: The Baptism of the Holy Ghost and Fire
- Movement: Holiness movement

Minnie F. Abrams (1859–1912) was an American evangelist and revivalist deaconess-missionary to India who was regarded as "the most prominent veteran female missionary in the holiness movement who identified with Pentecostalism", and the Pentecostal movement's second missiologist. Abrams influencers were Wesleyan theology and the Higher Life movement. She was one of the first two missionaries sent out by the Minneapolis Branch of the Woman's Foreign Missionary Society of the Methodist Episcopal Church. After twelve years, she left that post in Bombay to work with Pandita Ramabai at an undenominational mission in Kedgaon, Pune district. In 1907, Abrams became involved in India's Pentecostal movement. Her writings appeared in periodicals and in book form, The Baptism of the Holy Ghost and Fire (1906).

== Early life and education ==
Minnie F. Abrams was born in Lawrenceville, Outagamie County, Wisconsin, August 2, 1859. Her parents were Franklin and Julia Abrams. Minnie had at least two sisters. Her early home was at Mapleton, Minnesota.

She graduated from the Mankato Normal School (now Minnesota State University, Mankato), where she took the teachers' training course, and then studied for two yearts at Minnesota State University. She then studied at the Chicago Training School for Home and Foreign Missions; graduating with its first class, May Louise Hoover, wife of Willis Collins Hoover Kurt, being a classmate.

== Career ==
=== Teacher (Minnesota) ===
Abrams taught school in Minnestoa for a few years in her early twenties.

=== Woman's Foreign Missionary Society (Bombay) ===
In Saint Paul, Minnesota, in January 1886, Abrams attended the quarterly meeting of the Woman's Foreign Mission Society. Recently accepted as the missionary candidate, she gave some account of the circumstances that led her to give herself to missionary work.

In October 1887, Abrams left Waseca, Minnesota and sailed for Bombay, India, to assume the management of the then recently founded girls' school. Traveling with a Presbyterian party from New York City, she arrived in Liverpool, on October 21, and left the next day for Bombay on the Arabia with a United Presbyterian group. Abrams covered her own costs for travel and clothing to the field.

Up to this time, the woman's work in Bombay had been confined to visiting and teaching the native women in the Zenanas. But the missionaries had been pressured to open a day school in connection with their other work, that the children of the congregations might have the advantage of religious training, and be prepared in their turn to labor among the native population. Urgent appeals were sent to the women at home for permission to begin this new undertaking, and their consent being at length obtained, a small bungalow in the compound was set apart for the school building. Twenty-two children were enrolled the first term. Illness among the assistant missionaries threw the entire burden for a time upon Sarah DeLine, the missionary in charge, and it was to her relief that Abrams was sent. Abrams found the work as superintendent of the Methodist Episcopal Girls' School very taxing at first. It was no small undertaking to learn the Marathi language, and at the same time, to lay a broad foundation for the rapidly developing girls' schools. Some difficulty was experienced also during the first year in managing these girls out of school hours.

In the course of two years, Abrams found herself in charge of three very successful day schools. One of these was a combination boarding and day school for Christian girls, the daughters of Christian missionaries. The other two were day schools for non-Christian girls. The school for Christian girls increased in number rapidly, and soon fifty pupils were enrolled. Abrams felt the responsibility devolving upon her, as she was educator, physician, seamstress and financier for the enterprise. During the period of her superintendency of this school, a spiritual influence prevailed which resulted in conversions.

After a return to the U.S., in February 1893, she spoke from the pulpit of the Methodist Episcopal Church in Rochester, Minnesota on the topic of "Missions".

In 1894–85, during Miss DeLine's furlough, Abrams edited the Marathi language edition of the Woman's Friend.

In 1897, she began direct evangelistic work, journeying from village to village. During the first year of this new experience, Florence Sterling was her assistant. After Miss Sterling's marriage, however, Abrams traveled accompanied only by native helpers. During this time, MEC Bishop James Thoburn appointed Abrams to serve as a conference evangelist, a role she held for four years.

During the plague, Abrams was in the midst of the infected district, and was frequently compelled to leave her work to care for the sick and dying.

=== Mukti Mission (Kedgaon) ===
Early in the year 1898, Abrams was unexpectedly called to the position of superintendent of the Ramabai Home for child widows, during the absence of Pandita Ramabai in England and the U.S. This home was in Kedgaon, Pune district, a plague ravaged district. In addition to the care of the one hundred widows regularly provided for there, Abrams had charge of the three hundred famine widows. With the help of native assistants, she also kept up her evangelistic work, and reported at the end of the year fifty-two villages visited and the gospel story told in from three to six places in each village. The report of one day's work was as follows: "Yesterday we spoke in six different places to large audiences. After holding twelve services and starting home the people followed us in their bullock carts begging us to come to their homes." During the latter part of her year's work at the Ramabai Home, there were more than two hundred baptized, a church and Sunday School, class and prayer meetings were organized.

Early in 1899, Abrams asked to sever her connection with the Minneapolis Branch in order to carry on the work in the undenominational Ramabai Home. Her resignation was accepted with appreciation of the twelve years of service rendered to the Branch. With Manoramabai Ranade (daughter of Pandita Rambai), Abrams promoted the interests of the Mukti Mission in New Zealand in 1903.

=== Pentecostal movement ===
(undated)

Abrams was drawn to evangelistic work and for more than ten years, was closely connected with Mukti, especially during the Azusa Street Revival of 1905–6, when she embraced Pentecostalism. Her activities were reported in Indian periodicals such as the Bombay Guardian and the Christian Patriot.

Her book, The Baptism of the Holy Ghost and Fire (1906) fueled Pentecostalism in Chile.

During a furlough in the U.S. in 1908, she preached in venues associated with Pentecostalism, including in Los Angeles and Oakland, California, Chicago, Illinois, Homestead, Pennsylvania, and Massachusetts. The longing to preach the Gospel in places where the name of Christ was unknown led her to gather a group of eight single women who would join her work in the United Provinces.

She returned to India in 1910, and founded the Bazaleel Evangelistic Mission, which, in its day, was the only known Pentecostal women's missionary society. She made her headquarters at Uskabazar. In the same year, she went to Faizabad and Bahraich, in Uttar Pradesh with the American women who came out with her and also a band of girls from Mukti, to preach in the unevangelized villages.

== Death ==
Six months before her death, Abrams fell ill with a malignant form of malarial fever, as she was returning from a visit to a leper colony in North India. She died in North India, December 2, 1912.

== See also ==
- Christianity in Uttar Pradesh

== Selected works ==
=== Books ===
- The Baptism of the Holy Ghost and Fire, 2nd ed. Kedgaon, India: Mukti Mission Press, 1906.

=== Articles ===
- "A Bible Training School", Woman’s Missionary Friend (February 1901): 56 ()
- "Ramabai’s Work for India’s Widows", Missionary Review of the World, 24 no. 5 (May 1901): 338–47. (text)
- "The Baptism of the Holy Spirit at Mukti", The Missionary Review of the World (August 1906): 619–20. (text)
- "A New Outpouring of the Holy Spirit at Mukti, Accompanied by the Gift of Tongues", Faith Work in India (July 10, 1907).
- "A Message from Mukti", Confidence (September 15, 1908).
- "How the Recent Revival Was Brought About in India", Latter Rain Evangel (July 1909): 6–13.
- "Battles of a Faith Missionary", Latter Rain Evangel (March 1910).
- "A New Call to Faith", Trust (October 1910).
