= Marie Schlieps =

Latvian Deaconess

Marie Schlieps (1881-1919), was a Latvian (Baltic-German) deaconess.

She was executed during the Russian Bolshevik occupation in Riga in 1919. She became regarded as an Evangelical martyr.
