= Lehnin Abbey =

Monastery in Brandenburg, Germany

Coordinates: 52°19′13″N 12°44′36″E

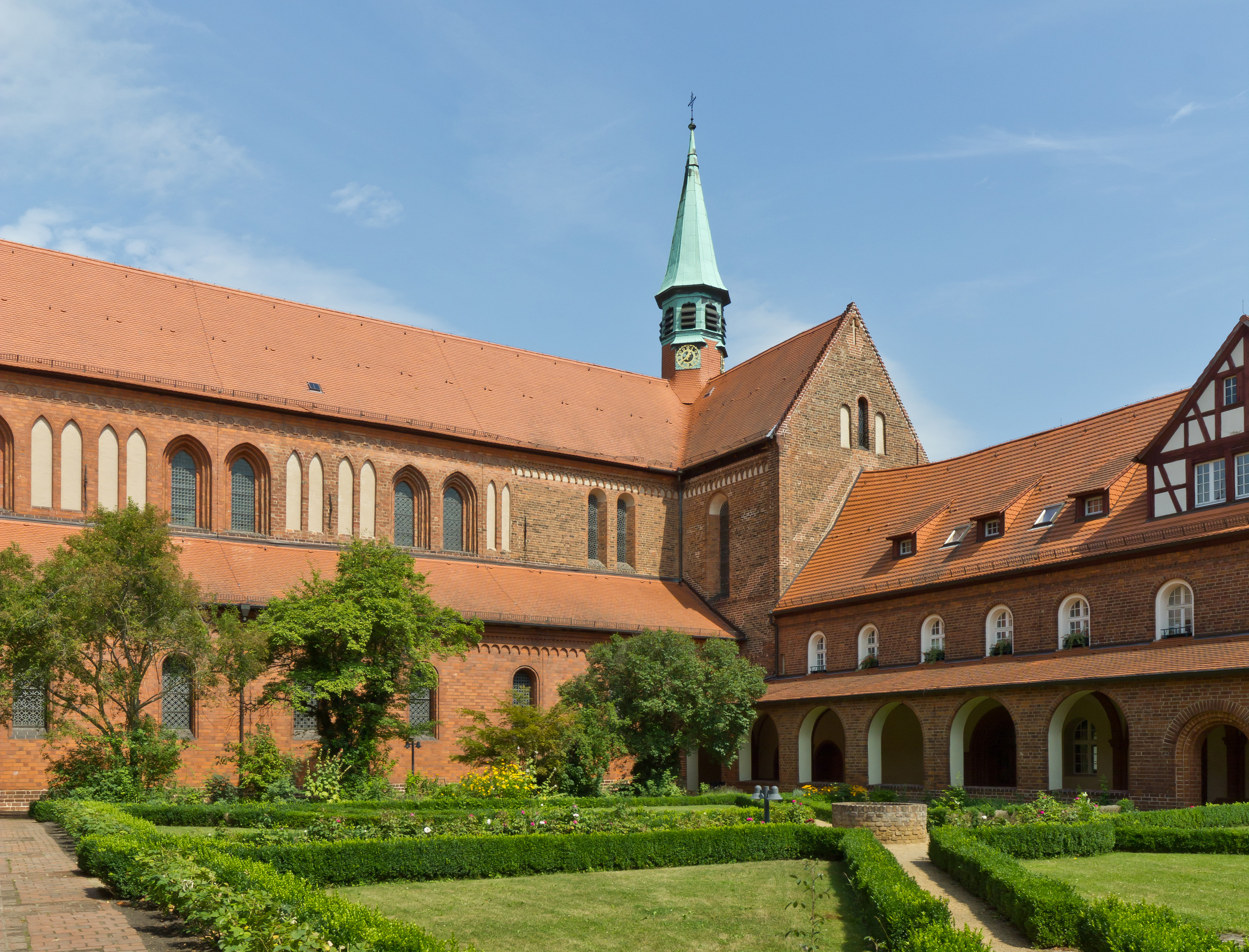
St Mary's Church and Cloisters

Lehnin Abbey (German: Kloster Lehnin) is a former Cistercian monastery in Lehnin in Brandenburg, Germany. Founded in 1180 and secularized during the Protestant Reformation in 1542, it has accommodated the Luise-Henrietten-Stift, a Protestant deaconesses' house since 1911. The foundation of the monastery in the newly established Margraviate of Brandenburg was an important step in the high medieval German Ostsiedlung; today the extended Romanesque and Gothic brickstone buildings, largely restored in the 1870s, are a significant part of Brandenburg's cultural heritage.

== History ==
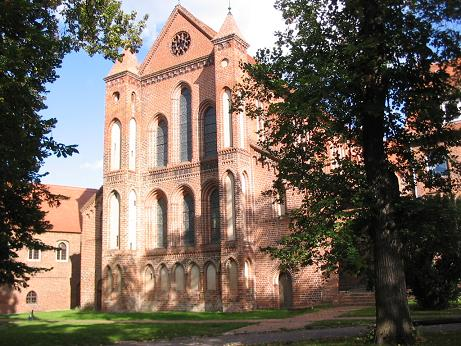
Abbey church, west front

Lehnin Abbey was founded by the Ascanian margrave Otto I of Brandenburg, 23 years after his father, late Albert the Bear had finally defeated the Slavic prince Jaxa of Köpenick and established the Brandenburg margraviate in 1157. According to legend, Otto, while hunting at the site, had fallen asleep beneath a giant oak, when a white deer appeared to him in a dream, whose furious attacks he could only ward off by appealing to the Saviour.

To consolidate their rule, the Ascanians called for Christian settlers, especially from Flanders (cf. Fläming) to settle among the "pagan" Slavs. Beside, they established Cistercian monasteries to develop the lands and to generate an income. Lehnin on the Zauche plateau south of the Havelland region, a daughter house (filial) of Morimond Abbey, was the first abbey to be founded as an Ascanian family monastery and place of burial. It soon became an important contributor to the land development of the Margraviate. Otto I was buried here in 1184. In its turn Lehnin founded the daughter houses of Paradies Abbey (1236, present-day Klasztor Paradyż in Gościkowo, Poland), Mariensee Abbey (1258, relocated to Chorin in 1273), and Himmelpfort Abbey near Fürstenberg/Havel (1299).

The abbey was dissolved in 1542 during the Reformation and turned into an electoral demesne and hunting lodge under the Hohenzollern elector Joachim II of Brandenburg. Devastated during the Thirty Years' War, it was rebuilt under the "Great Elector" Frederick William of Brandenburg from about 1650 and became a summer residence of his first consort Louise Henriette of Nassau. After her death in 1667, Frederick William encouraged the settlement of Huguenot refugees at Lehnin according to his 1685 Edict of Potsdam, which added largely to the recovery of the local economy. Lehnin received access to the Havel river via an artificial waterway and became the site of a large brickyard, while the historic monastery premises again decayed and were used as a stone quarry.

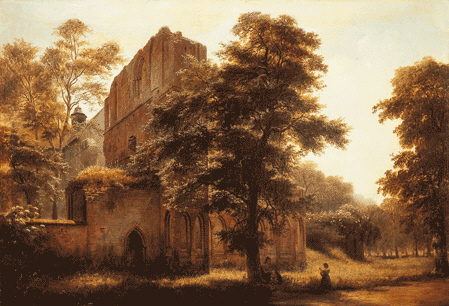
Lehnin Abbey Ruins: Eduard Gaertner, 1858

In the 19th century, when Lehnin Abbey came into the focus of German Romanticism and national sentiment, the decay was halted at the initiative of King Frederick William IV of Prussia and his nephew, Crown Prince Frederick William. From 1871 to 1877, the ruins were remarkably well restored.

In 1911 the premises were purchased by the Prussian Union of churches to house the Protestant community known as the Luise-Henrietten-Stift. The deaconesses adopted the Cistercian tradition; they were suppressed under Nazi rule, when the authorities seized large parts of the monastery complex for Wehrmacht and SS purposes. From 1949 onwards, Lehnin Abbey was turned into a hospital, today it serves as a geriatric rehabilitation clinic and nursing home.

== Buildings ==
Lehnin Abbey is significant for its Brick Gothic architecture, and is one of the finest German Brick Gothic period buildings in the country.

== Vaticinium Lehninense ==
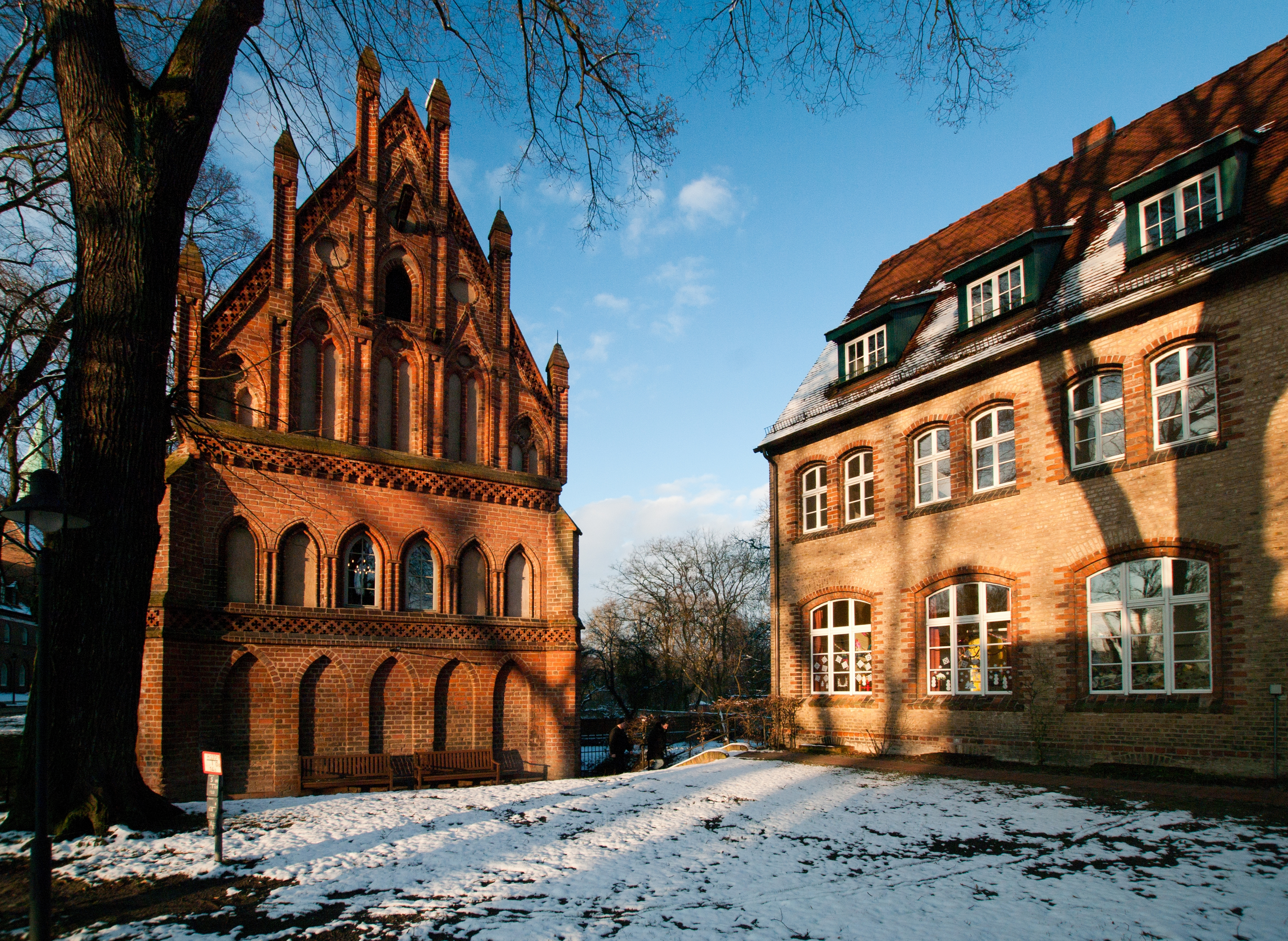
King's house

The Vaticinium Lehninense was a work, famous in its day, which purported to be the creation of a monk of Lehnin called Hermann, supposedly written in the 13th or 14th century. Manuscripts of the "prophecy", which was first printed in 1722 or 1723, existed in Berlin, Dresden, Breslau and Göttingen.

It begins by lamenting the end of the Ascanian line of the Margraves of Brandenburg, with the death of Henry the Younger in 1320, and gives a faithful portrait of several of the margraves, until it comes to deal with Frederick William, Elector of Brandenburg (d. 1688). Here the writer leaves the region of safety and ceases to make any realistic portrait of the people about whom he is prophesying. The work ends with a Catholic ruler who re-establishes Lehnin as a monastery and is also made to restore the union of the Holy Roman Empire.

The work is anti-Prussian, but the real author cannot be discovered. Andreas Fromm (d. 1685), rector of St Peter's church in Berlin, an ardent Lutheran, is commonly believed to have been the forger. The first to unmask the fraud was Pastor Weiss, who proved in his "Vaticinium Germanicum" (Berlin, 1746) that the pseudo-prophecy was really written between 1688 and 1700. Even after the detection of its true character, attempts were made to use it in anti-Prussian polemics.

== Other burials ==
- Matilda of Groitzsch, spouse of Albert II, Margrave of Brandenburg
- Herman, Margrave of Brandenburg-Salzwedel
- Albert III, Margrave of Brandenburg-Salzwedel
- Catherine of Saxony, Electress of Brandenburg

== See also ==
- Klostersee
