= Beate Schmidt =

German serial killer (born 1966)

- Born: Wolfgang Schmidt; 5 October 1966 (age 60); Lehnin, Bezirk Potsdam, East Germany
- Other names: Pink Giant; The Beast of Beelitz; Beelitz murderer
- Conviction: Murder
- Penalty: 15 years in prison and detention in a psychiatric hospital

Details
- Victims: 6
- Span of crimes: 24 October 1989 – 5 April 1991
- Country: Germany
- State: Brandenburg
- Date apprehended: 1 August 1991

Beate Schmidt (born Wolfgang Schmidt; 5 October 1966) is a German serial killer and rapist, who killed six people and injured four between 1989 and 1991 in various villages in Brandenburg.

The then-unidentified killer was nicknamed the "Pink Giant" (German: Rosa Riese), from witness descriptions of Schmidt, who stood 190 cm (6 ft 3 in), and the presence of discarded pink lingerie at some of the crime scenes. As the murders and rapes occurred close to Beelitz, Schmidt was also named the "Beast of Beelitz" (Bestie von Beelitz) and "Beelitz murderer" (Beelitz-Mörder) by the tabloid newspapers Superillu and Bild.

== Early life ==
Schmidt was born Wolfgang Schmidt in Lehnin, East Germany, as the eldest of three children. Schmidt started to engage in cross-dressing around age seven by wearing female underwear to purposely urinate and defecate in them. Schmidt described feeling "overwhelmingly pleasant feelings" in this manner. After finding the dirty garments hidden in a barn, Schmidt's mother refused to let Schmidt go outside to play with other children. After a doctor's visit left the parents without a diagnosis, they began locking their clothing cabinets, with Schmidt instead scavenging women's clothing from dumpsters and landfills. Schmidt began masturbating at the age of eight or nine, gradually developing more specific and definitively sexual practices such as self-covering in feces, defecating into bras and wearing soiled underwear backwards. As a teenager, Schmidt neglected school work, social events and other activities to find time to collect more clothes. Schmidt dropped out of school in tenth grade.

In 1985, Schmidt applied for a ten-year tenure in the Volkspolizei in Potsdam, reaching the rank of Unteroffizier, and switched from train supervisor to police duty in the 20th unit of Volkspolizei-Bereitschaft. In late April 1989, the precinct terminated Schmidt along with three other officers for hosting a private neo-Nazi meeting that celebrated Adolf Hitler's 100th birthday. Schmidt was briefly employed as a crane operator for a steel mill, but was fired only months later for repeated absences. From then on Schmidt worked manual labour jobs, last working as a farmhand in an orchard. Schmidt frequently showed up drunk to jobs, stole items from workplaces, got into physical fights with colleagues and once willfully damaged the apartment of a girlfriend and her family while intoxicated. The couple broke up after a relative of the girlfriend found several knives hidden in Schmidt's bedroom, which were reported to the police, but not investigated further. Schmidt also often went on walks through the surrounding forests while cross-dressing, becoming frustrated with the angry reactions of female passersby.

== Murders ==
On 24 October 1989, Schmidt broke into the house of Edeltraut Nixdorf, 51, in Deetz to steal underwear. Nixdorf saw the intruder from the garden and confronted Schmidt with a rake. Schmidt forced Nixdorf to the ground and choked the victim before bludgeoning her to death with a hammer. Schmidt then raped the corpse and wrapped the body in a blanket, being spotted by a neighbour in the process and fleeing thereafter. A large shoe print, size 49 EU, was found at the scene, with the sole imprint identified as that of a NVA-issue boot, worn by soldiers and certain VoPo officers. Nixdorf's husband committed suicide by pesticide poisoning in March 1990.

On 24 May 1990, Schmidt fatally strangled Christa Naujoks, 45, with an electric cable near a garbage dump in Ferch. The body was raped post-mortem and discovered the next day by Naujoks' ex-husband, who worked on the site as a groundkeeper. Soiled pink women's underwear was found around the dumping site. Police also received report of a tall individual harassing women in an adjacent forest.

On 13 March 1991, Schmidt attacked Inge Fischer, 34, while walking home through a forest between Borkheide and Neuendorf. Fischer was beaten and kicked before being dragged off the beaten path, where she was raped and then killed with a stab wound to the neck. The body was found over a week later by hikers. It was found that Fischer's underwear had been replaced with pink ones and a sweep of the area found stashes of women's underwear and pornographic magazines buried in ditches. After a re-examination of the two previous crime scenes, Brandenburg Police connected all three murders to one assailant.

On 22 March 1991, Schmidt attacked Tamara Petrowskaja, 44, and her three-month old son Stanislaw during a walk in the woods in Beelitz-Heilstätten. Schmidt tied up and gagged Petrowskaja with two pieces of underwear before killing Stanislaw by crushing the baby's skull against a tree stump. Shoe prints on the infant's clothes also indicate that Schmidt stomped and kicked the child. Afterwards, Schmidt raped Petrowskaja and strangled the victim to death with a bra. Schmidt switched out the victim's panties. A search of the crime scene uncovered several hidden underwear stashes, which filled five trash bags. Both victims were Russian nationals.

On 6 April 1991, Schmidt broke into an apartment in Fichtenwalde, fatally strangling Talita Bremer, 66. Her corpse was raped and her death discovered two weeks later by a relative. The murder was connected as clothing drawers had been rummaged through. Sperm samples and a pubic hair were found by police forensic teams.

=== Non-fatal assaults and rape ===
On an unspecified date in summer 1990, Schmidt got into a fight with a homeless woman over recyclable trash at a landfill. The victim was beaten nearly to death with a truncheon.

On 9 June 1990, Schmidt attacked and raped Edith Weber, 58, at a garbage dump near Wust. Schmidt had attempted to beat Weber to death with a wooden pole, but the victim was found by construction workers and survived with heavy injuries.

On 6 April 1991, before the murder of Talita Bremer, Schmidt attacked two 12-year-old girls in Sputendorf bei Ludwigsfelde. Schmidt wielded a knife and tried to stab the victims, but fled after they resisted with scratches to the face. The girls provided a detailed description of their assailant to police, allowing for the creation of a composite sketch. A reward of 20,000 DM was issued. Within months, the family of Schmidt's fiancée reported a resemblance to police, but the claim was not investigated closer.

== Arrest ==
In July 1991, Schmidt was illegally camping in a forest near Schmerzke, publicly masturbating near a tent while wearing a bra over a shirt. Schmidt was spotted by jogger Mike Klein, who had noticed underwear hanging in the branches. Klein recognized Schmidt as the suspect on the police sketch, also seeing a number of knives in the tent, and drove to Brandenburg an der Havel to inform police. The area was put under observation by SEK, as the precinct worried that Schmidt might escape an immediate police response. Klein often returned to the forest to watch the police operation, sometimes accompanied by his friend Andreas Siegel. On 1 August, Klein and Siegel coincidentally came across Schmidt camping in a different part of the woods and seizing the opportunity, Klein and Siegel pretended to be foresters and coaxed Schmidt into the covered flatbed of their truck, supposedly to clean up the litter from the other campsite. Upon arrival, Schmidt was overpowered by the SEK officers on watch duty, handcuffed to a tree and transported to Potsdam, where Schmidt confessed to six murders to Volker Kelm, the lead detective in the cases since 1989. By this time, Schmidt was engaged to a 19-year-old woman and living at her house in Rädel.

Mike Klein was initially denied the 20,000 DM reward for finding Schmidt, as police claimed that tips from other civilian sources would have led to the arrest anyway. He ultimately received 12,000 DM, with the remaining 8,000 DM being divided amongst the other informers. In a 2018 interview with Klein for RBB crime show Täter|Opfer|Polizei, detective Volker Kelm described Klein's actions as "false imprisonment under any other circumstances", as there was no acute danger to his life, nor had he acted to prevent an actively occurring crime. Chief prosecutor Marianna Böhm called Klein and Siegel "bounty hunters", dismissing their actions as purely financially motivated and disruptive to the police investigation. Klein was thus not called to testify in court or otherwise acknowledged by law enforcement.

=== Trial and sentencing ===
Schmidt's trial commenced on 20 October 1992. Before the trial, Schmidt gave an exclusive interview to journalist Gisela Friedrichsen.

On 1 December 1992, Schmidt was sentenced to 15 years' imprisonment at Brandenburg-Görden Prison, followed by indefinite detention in a psychiatric hospital in Brandenburg an der Havel. Forensic psychiatrist Wilfried Rasch had argued in favor of a punishment with involuntary commitment after diagnosing Schmidt as having a "sexual-pathological development [...] with paraphilic, coprophilic, transvestite, and sadistic elements", resulting in diminished responsibility. Gerhard Mauz criticized press coverage for dehumanizing Schmidt as "a spawn of Hell", finding the response excessive, even for the magnitude of the crimes, as this affected related persons such as Schmidt's fiancée, who had an abortion before the trial due to public pressure following an open campaign entitled "Abort the child of the Pink Giant" by a Springer newspaper. The campaign claimed that Schmidt's violent impulses were genetic, arguing that the child would be at risk of inheriting similar defects.

== Imprisonment ==
In prison, Schmidt began identifying as transgender. Press footage from 1997 showed Schmidt had received access to women's clothing and make-up and was allowed to decorate the cell with plushed animals and magazine cut-outs. An application for a name change to Beate Schmidt was met by the court in 2001. Since 2009 Schmidt has undergone a hormone treatment for gender reassignment. In 2010, Schmidt was investigated for raping and causing another transgender inmate to attempt suicide. In July 2013, Schmidt's restrictions were loosened for unsupervised walks on the facility's green space. Further privileges for day trips into Brandenburg an der Havel were briefly granted following "first steps forwards" during therapy, but revoked after media published CCTV images of Schmidt buying pornographic magazines at a gas station.

== See also ==
- List of German serial killers
