= Evangelical Pentecostal Church =

Evangelical Pentecostal Church may refer to multiple denominations:

- Pentecostal revival movement in Chile
- Evangelical Church The Mission of Besançon
