= Lehnin Training Area =

Coordinates: 52°15′53″N 12°47′22″E

Lehnin Training Area (German: Truppenübungsplatz Lehnin) is a military training area in Potsdam-Mittelmark, in the state of Brandenburg, in Germany. It covers some 74 square kilometers.

== Location ==
Lehnin Training Area is located approximately 25 km southwest of Potsdam surrounded by Brandenburg pine forests. The name comes from the town of Lehnin, where a Cistercian abbey was founded in 1180. Today the Lehnin monastery houses the Luise-Henrietten-Stift of the Evangelical Landeskirche Berlin-Brandenburg.

The following cities and municipalities border the Lehnin military headquarters (clockwise from the north): Emstal, Busendorf, Kanin, Fichtenwalde, Borkwalde, Neuendorf, Brück, Freienthal, Damelang, Cammer, Rädel and Kloster Lehnin.

== Management ==
The management of the site moved to Brück in 2005. Since 1 April 2007, the training area has been run by the Klietz military training centre in the district of Stendal.

== History ==
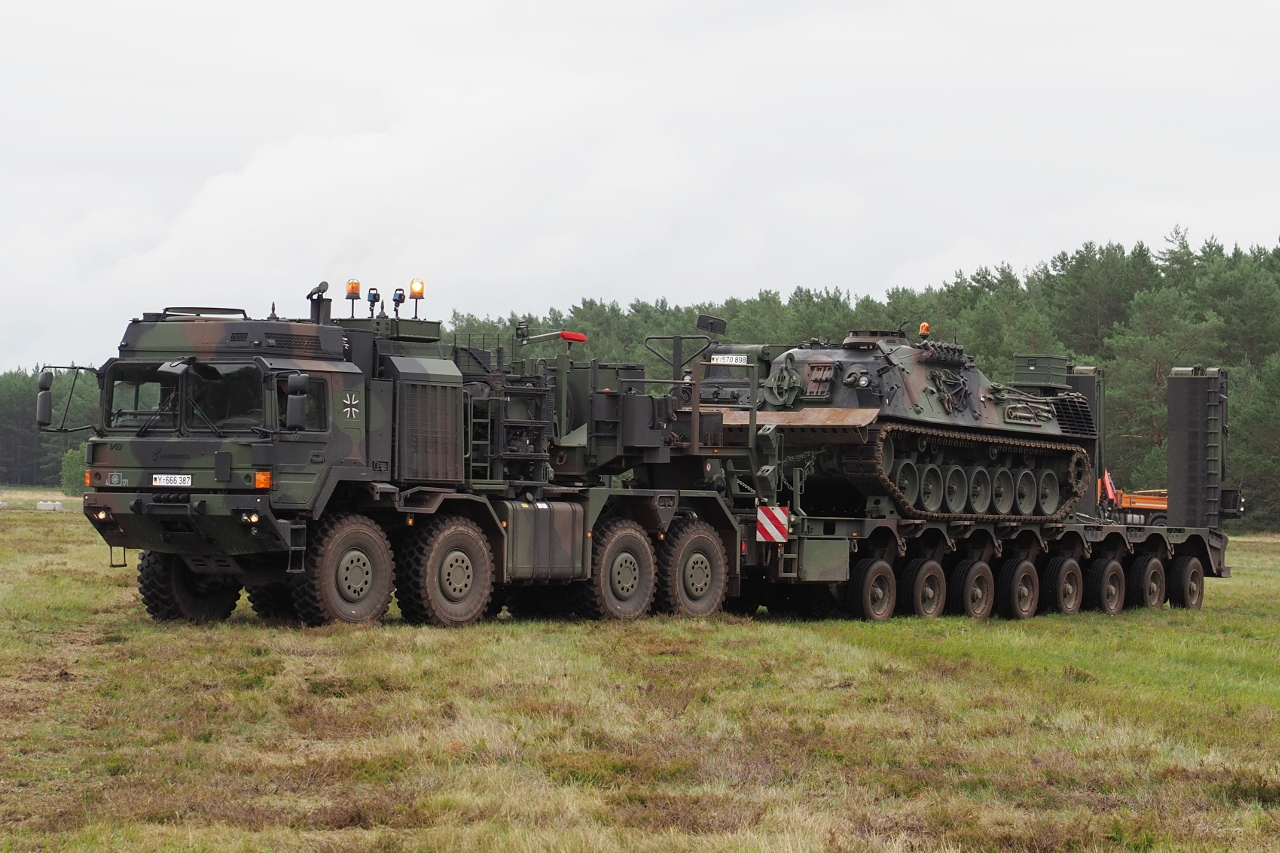
German Army heavy equipment transporter SLT 70 Elefant 2 consisting of a RMMV HX81 tractor (SaZgM) and a DOLL tera S8P-0S2 Spider eight-axle semi-trailer (SaAnh 70t), assigned to LogBat 171, loaded with Bergepanzer 2 on display during Open Day at Klietz training area 2025.

Lehnin was established in 1956 under the cover name "Dunkelkammer" for the National People's Army (Nationale Volksarmee, NVA) of the GDR. In 1984, the construction of the Rauhberg site began, and was released for use in 1989. The paratroopers of the NVA (Luftsturmregiment 40) were stationed in the course of the 1980s before being moved to the northern edge of the exercise site.

In October 1990, the Bundeswehr took over the place, which further expanded the site in the following period.
