= Reckahn Solar Park =

Photovoltaic power station in Reckahn, southwest of Berlin, Germany

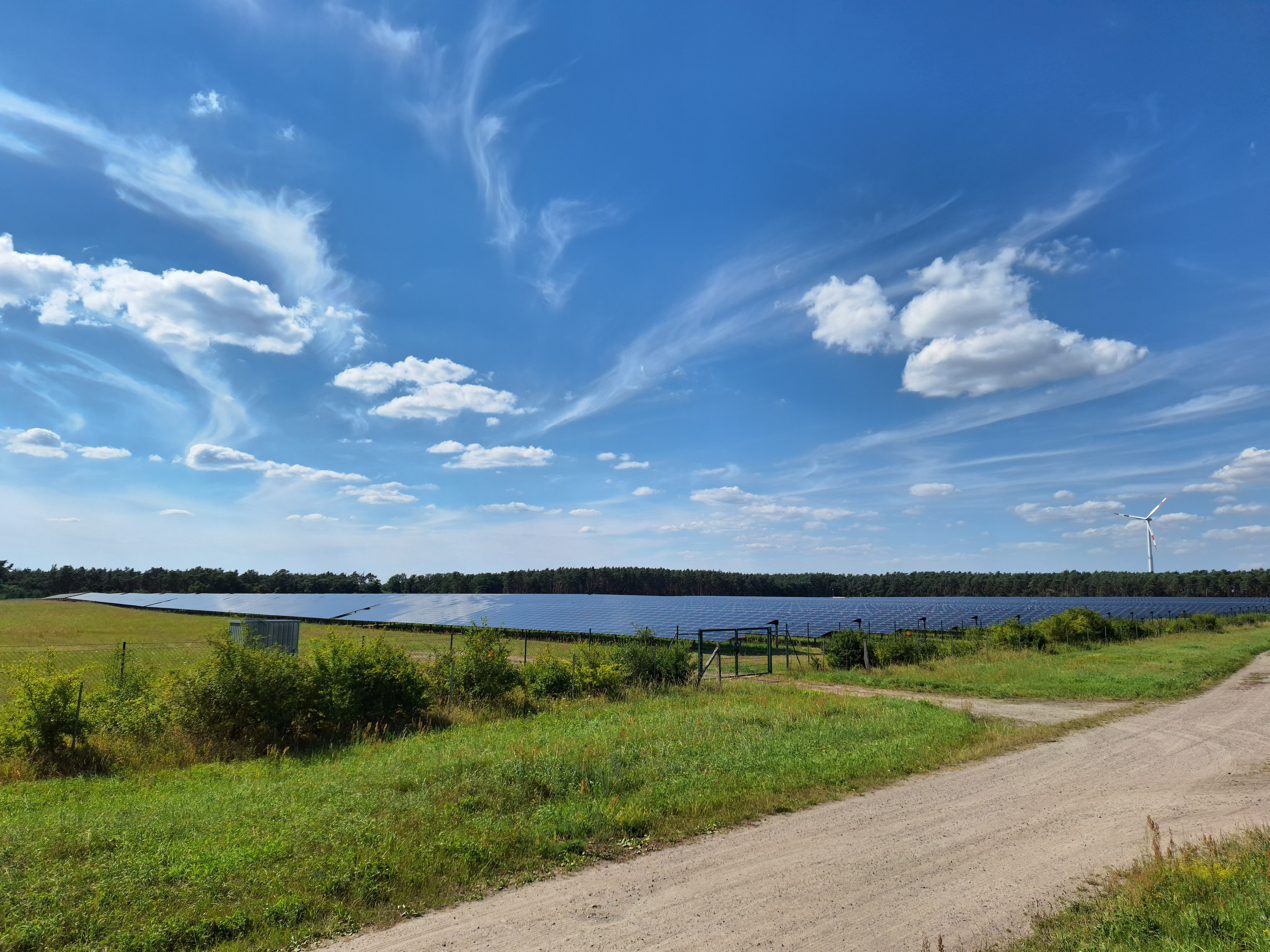
- Country: Germany
- Location: Reckahn, Kloster Lehnin, Brandenburg
- Coordinates: 52°20′N 12°33′E
- Status: Operational
- Commission date: 2010, 2011

Solar farm
- Type: Flat-panel PV
- Site area: 85 ha (210 acres) Site plan

Power generation
- Nameplate capacity: 37.7 MW_{p}

Reckahn Solar Park is a photovoltaic power station in Reckahn, southwest of Berlin, Germany. It has a capacity of 37.7 megawatt (MW) and was constructed in three phases. Reckahn I was 22.661 MW covering 56 hectares (140 acres) and was built by Beck Energy GmbH (Belectric) using 292,000 First Solar thin-film CdTe-panels, and was expected to produce about 22 gigawatt-hours per year. Reckahn II added 13.3 MW, using 172,000 modules on a 35 hectares (86 acres) site. Reckahn III, completed in 2011, added 1.8 MW, bringing the total to 37.7 MW. The FIT is 21.1 Euro cents per kilowatt-hour.

== See also ==
- PV system
- List of photovoltaic power stations
- Solar power in Germany
- Electricity sector in Germany
