= Chicago Training School =

Chicago Training School can refer to:

- Chicago Manual Training School
- Chicago Training School for Home and Foreign Missions
