= Amanda Cajander =

Finnish nurse and deaconess

- Born: Mathilda Fredrika Nygren; 10 January 1827
- Died: 23 February 1871 (aged 44)
- Occupations: Nurse, deaconess
- Spouse: Anders Cajander

Mathilda Fredrika "Amanda" Cajander, née Nygren (10 January 1827 – 23 February 1871), was a Finnish deaconess and a pioneer within medical care in Finland.

== Life ==
Cajander married the doctor Anders Cajander in 1848 and had two children. In 1856, by the age of 29, however, she was widowed and her children had died. After this loss, Cajander moved to train as a deaconess at the Evangelical Deaconess Institute in Saint Petersburg. The wealthy Finnish philanthropist Aurora Karamsin was familiar with the institute and when she decided to open a deaconess institution in Helsinki she invited Cajander to be its first principal. The institute opened in December 1867, during the great Famine of 1866–68. To begin with, the institute was modest – a small hospital with eight beds, an orphanage and an asylum – and aimed to primarily help women and children and to care for the sick.

In 1869 Cajander founded a children's home in Helsinki.

She is buried in the Hietaniemi Cemetery in Helsinki.

== Legacy ==
Cajander and Karamsin are considered the first Christian philanthropists in Finland, and are credited with introducing the new idea of women having a vocation to work for the church. The first deaconess educated in Finland became Cecilia Blomqvist. The secular nursing profession for women in Finland did not start until the nursing courses of Anna Broms in the 1880s.

== See also ==
- Maria Cederschiöld (deaconess)
