= Anna Broms =

Finnish educator and pioneer in nursing

Anna Broms (1862–1890), was a Finnish educator and a pioneer within the nursing profession in Finland. In 1889, she became the first principal of the first education courses for nurses in Finland and a pioneer in her profession.

Anna Broms studied in Sweden, Scotland and London. Upon her return to Finland in 1888, she was appointed head of the newly founded nurses course at the new Surgical Hospital in Helsinki, educating the pioneer Finnish nurses. She has been described as efficient and with never ending energy in her dedication to her work. She died at the age of 28 of an Intracranial hemorrhage.

== See also ==
- Amanda Cajander
- Cecilia Blomqvist
