= Pentecostal revival movement in Chile =

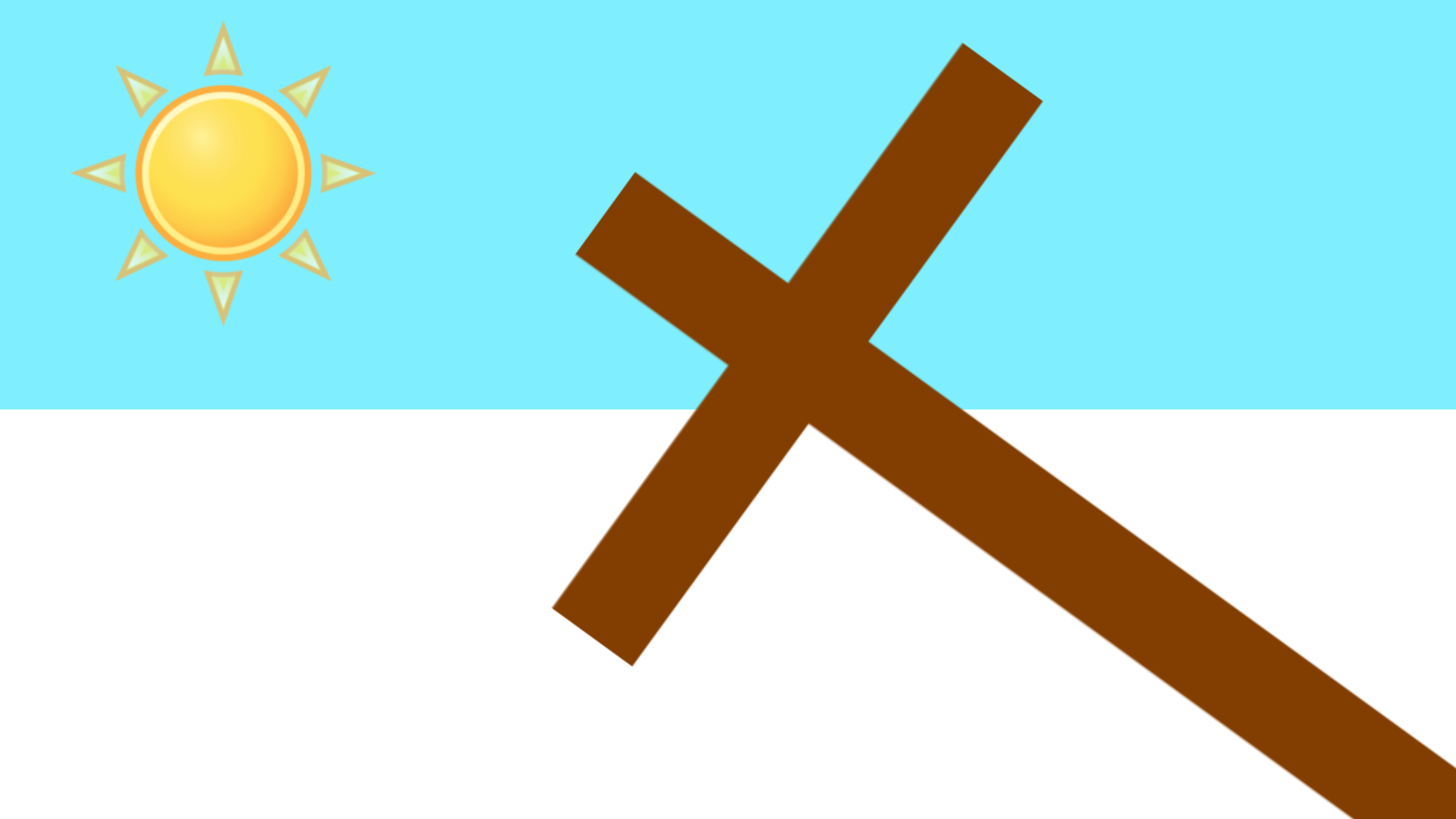
Flag used by the Chilean Methodist Pentecostal movement

The Pentecostal Movement in Chile began in the Methodist Episcopal Church in 1902, in Valparaíso, under the pastorship of an American missionary, Rev. Dr. Willis C. Hoover K.

Hoover encouraged his fellow Methodists to seek charismatic gifts and soon reported that his congregations in Valparaíso and Santiago were singing, shouting and speak in tongues. The Pentecostals broke away from the American-founded Methodist church in 1910 to form a new church, the Methodist Pentecostal Church. In the 1930s, a schism over leadership led to the formation of the Evangelical Pentecostal Church. Another schism in the 1940s led to the creation of the Pentecostal Church of Chile and the Pentecostal Mission Church.

Pentecostal missions from the US (including Assemblies of God, Church of God and The Foursquare Church) arrived in Chile in the late 1950s.

In 2021, about 15% of the Chilean population identified as "evangelical". This term is mostly used for Christians who are not Catholic.

The largest Pentecostal denominations represented in Chile are:

- Iglesia Evangelica Pentecostal - Evangelical Pentecostal Church - in 17 countries, including United States
- Iglesia Metodista Pentecostal - Pentecostal Methodist Church - in 4 countries
- Iglesia Pentecostal de Chile - Pentecostal Church of Chile (She used to have a mission in Brooklyn, New York)
- Iglesia Unida Metodista Pentecostal - United Pentecostal Methodist Church - in 7 countries

== See also ==
- Religion in Cuba
- Christianity in Cuba
- Protestantism in Cuba
- Catholicism in Cuba
