= Klostersee (Lehnin) =

Lake in Brandenburg, Germany

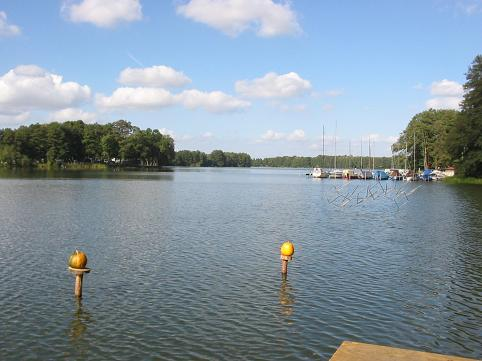

- Location within Brandenburg
- Location: Brandenburg
- Coordinates: 52°20′0.7″N 12°44′28.8″E
- Primary inflows: Emster
- Primary outflows: Emster
- Basin countries: Germany
- Surface area: 0.38 km^{2} (0.15 sq mi)
- Max. depth: 4–6 m (13–20 ft)
- Surface elevation: 29 m (95 ft)

Klostersee (Lehnin) is a lake in Brandenburg, Germany. At an elevation of 29 m, its surface area is 38 hectares (0.38 km^{2}). It is located in the municipality of Kloster Lehnin, Potsdam-Mittelmark district.

== See also ==
- Lehnin Abbey
