= Lucy Rider Meyer =

American social worker, educator, physician and author

Lucy Jane Rider Meyer
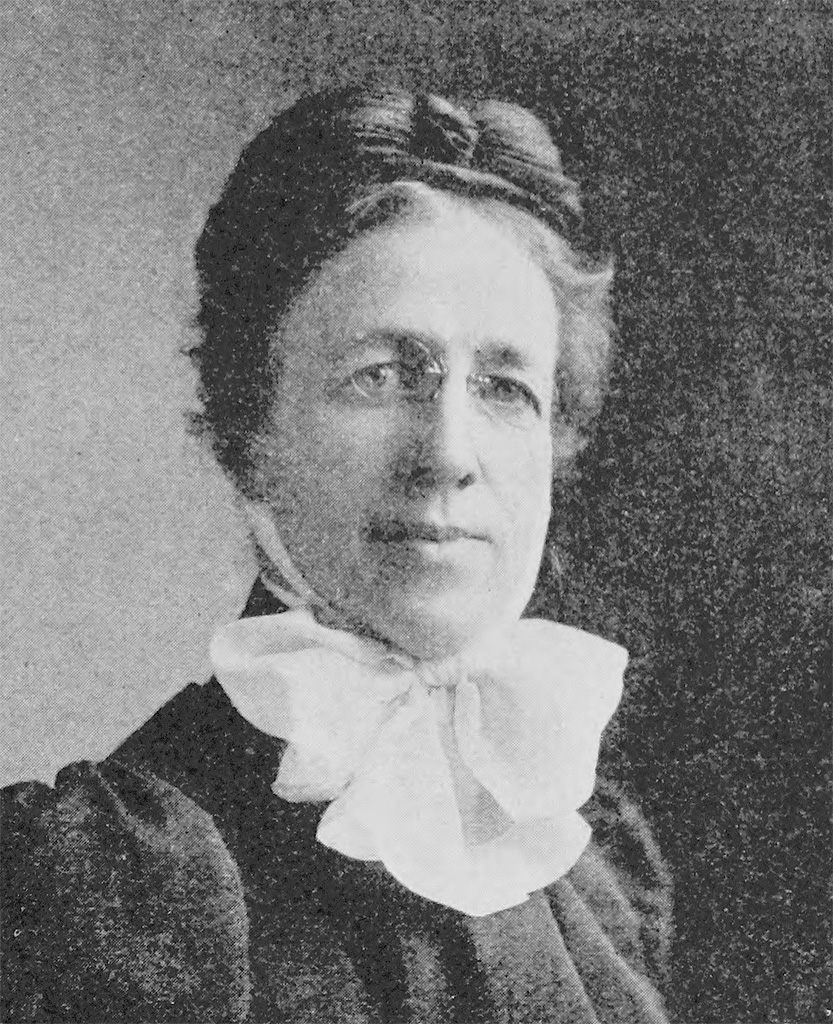
- Born: Lucy Jane Rider; September 9, 1849; New Haven, Vermont
- Died: March 16, 1922 (aged 72)
- Occupations: educator, social worker, author, physician

Lucy Jane Rider Meyer (September 9, 1849 – March 16, 1922) was an American social worker, educator, physician, and author who cofounded the Chicago Training School for City, Home, and Foreign Missions in Illinois. She is credited with reviving the office of the female deacon (or deaconess) in the U.S. Methodist Episcopal Church.

== Education and personal life ==
Lucy Jane Rider was born in New Haven, Vermont to Jane Child Rider and Richard Rider. She attended various public schools as well as the New Hampton Literary Institution (a college-preparatory school) and the Upham Theological Seminary. She went on to Oberlin College, from which she graduated in 1872 with a degree in literary studies after just two years.

In 1873 she entered the Woman's Medical College of Pennsylvania but withdrew after two years. She had intended to become a Methodist medical missionary but changed her mind after her then-fiancé died in 1875. She did not get her medical degree until 1887 when she was awarded the M.D. by the Women's Medical College of Chicago.

In 1885, she married a Chicago businessman and Methodist pastor named Josiah Shelly Meyer.

== Early career ==
Meyer began her career in various educational capacities. For a year (1876–77) she was principal of the Troy Conference Academy in Poultney, Vermont. Then, after studying chemistry at the Massachusetts Institute of Technology (1877–78), she became a professor of chemistry for two years at McKendree College in Lebanon, Illinois (1879–81).

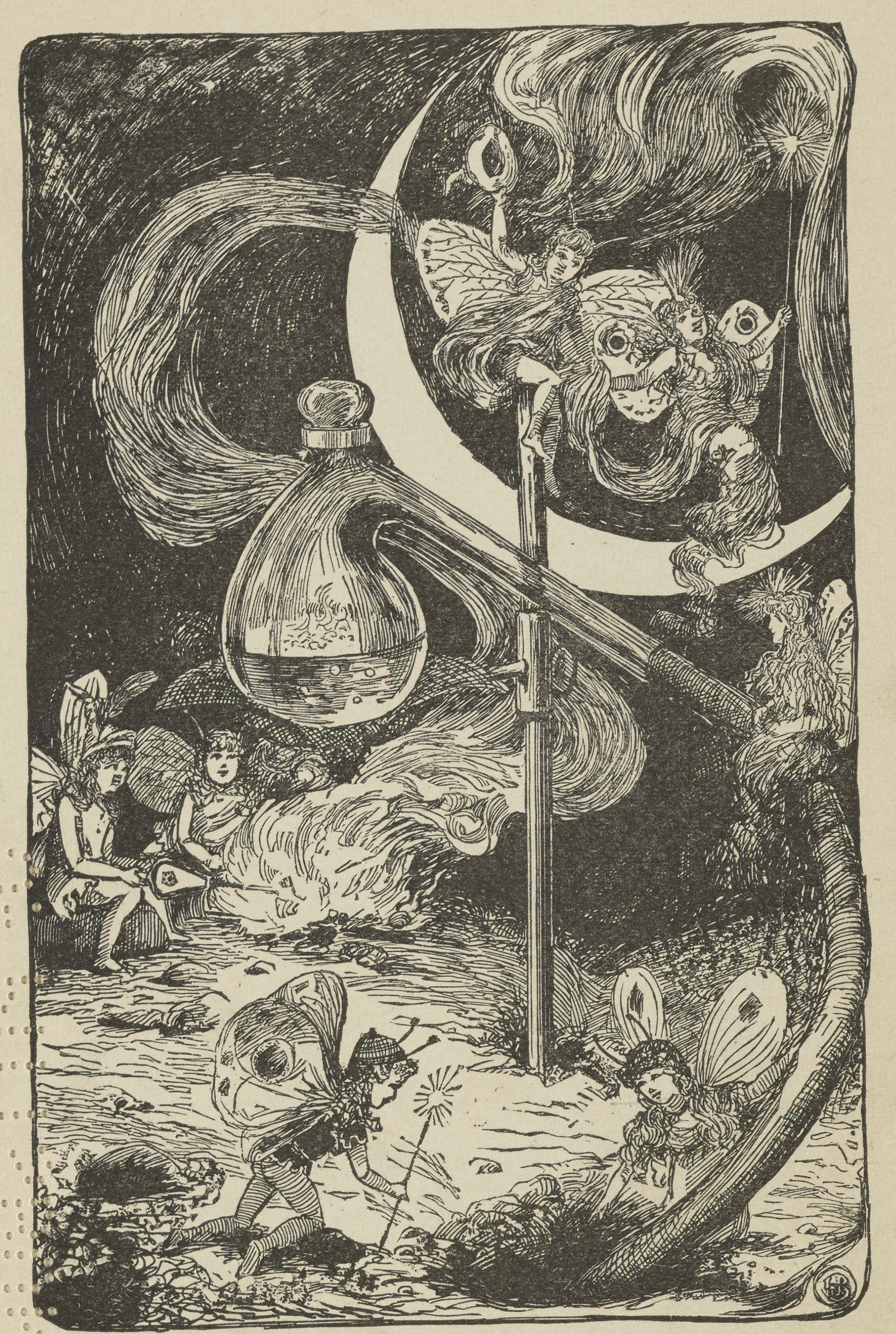
Frontispiece from Lucy Rider Meyer, Real Fairy Folks (1887), "Some of the real fairy folks"

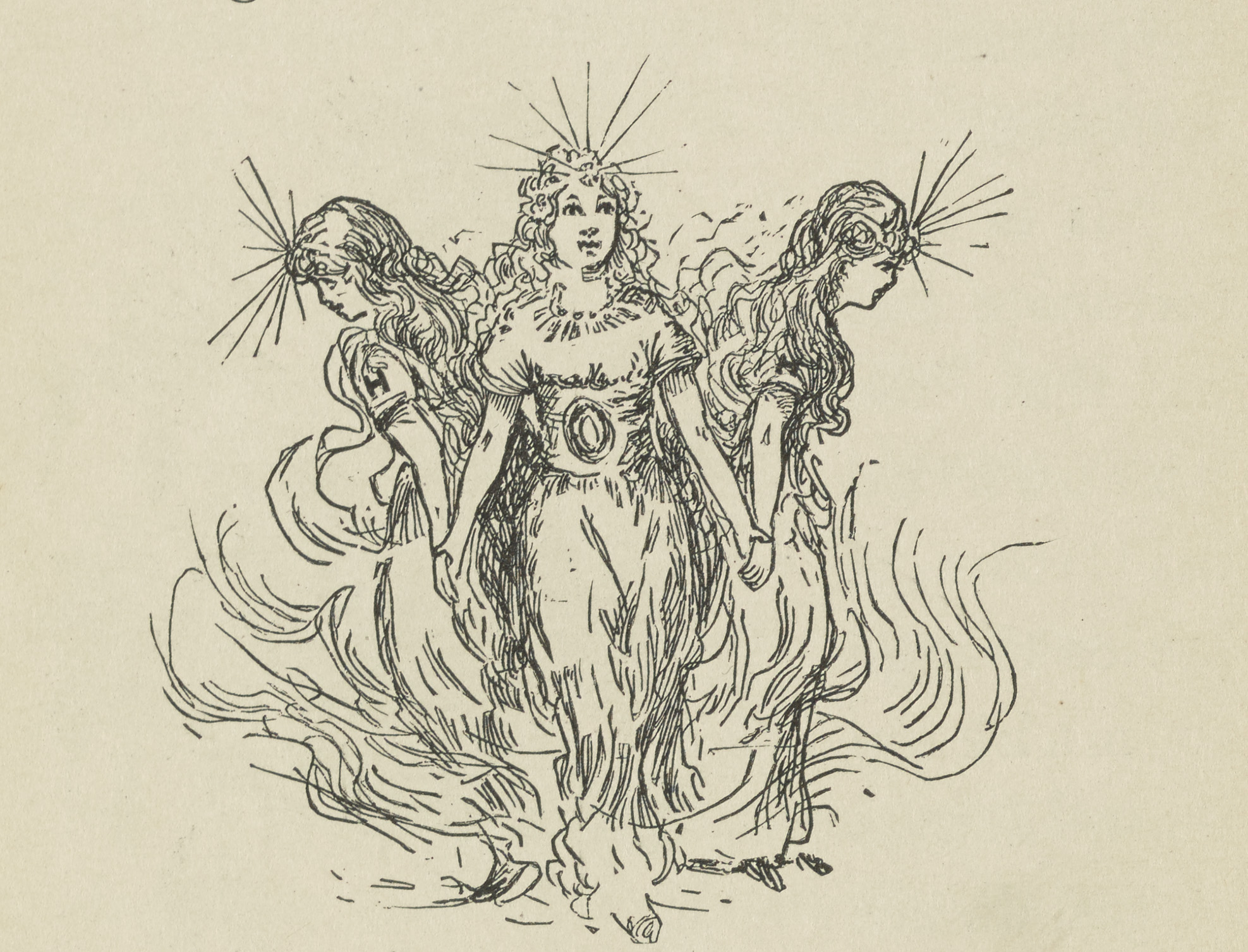
Illustration from Lucy Rider Meyer, Real Fairy Folks (1887), showing fairies marked H (hydrogen) and O (oxygen) holding hands to create H_{2}O, or water.

She would later write an introductory book for children about chemistry, Real Fairy Folks, or, The Fairy Land of Chemistry: Explorations in the World of Atoms (1887). This book stands in a Victorian tradition of using fairies to explain the sciences (especially botany, through the folkloric connections between fairies and flowers). The frontispiece, for example, shows fairies clambering over a glass retort; another illustration shows the fairies H and Cl holding hands to form HCl, or hydrochloric acid. Meyer's book offered numerous practical examples of experiments that could be carried out with everyday materials like candles and vinegar. The illustrations reinforce the concepts being presented: fairy gases fly about actively, while fairy solids huddle together on the ground. For Victorians like Meyer, there was no contradiction in using fancy to present fact, for the natural world was full of wonders just as marvelous as those of the imagination.

From 1881 to 1884, Meyer served as field secretary for the Illinois State Sunday School Association and attended the 1880 World Sunday School Convention in London. Her experience as field secretary convinced her that people wishing to become religious teachers needed better training.

== Chicago Training School ==
In 1885, Meyer and her husband opened the Chicago Training School for City, Home, and Foreign Missions (later simplified to Chicago Training School for Home and Foreign Missions). Meyer was its first principal (1885-1917) and her husband its first superintendent. The school, which trained young women, offered a broad curriculum of bible studies, theology, church history, economics, sociology, basic medical training, and—most unusually—courses on the accomplishments of women. This led to attacks from those who believed women did not need this level of education to do Christian missionary work. She was also attacked for her view that the Bible was not dictated by God but was written by inspired individuals and edited together in various ways.

=== Revival of female deacons ===
Meyer became interested in reviving within American Methodism an ancient tradition of female deacons (also known as deaconesses) in the Christian church. Female deacons were well established in Christianity by the 4th century A.D. These women cared for the poor and the ill, and they instructed and assisted women in the rite of baptism, among other duties. The female diaconate later disappeared for many centuries before a modern revival occurred, first in Germany in the 1830s and then in England in the 1860s.

In the summer of 1887, Meyer began preparing some of the women students of the Chicago Training School to become deacons, with a mission of working in tenement communities. Within the school, she set up the Methodist Deaconess Home and appointed her former student Isabella Thoburn as the first house mother and superintendent. She even designed a uniform for the new women deacons. In 1888, the Methodist Episcopal Church formally recognized the office of deaconess. Her achievement in reviving the female diaconate was celebrated in one of her nicknames, the 'Archbishop of Deaconesses'. Meyer's success inspired the formation of similar deaconess-training programs, such as the New England Deaconess Home and Training School in Boston, Massachusetts (founded 1889) and the Methodist Deaconess Home in Toronto, Canada (founded 1894).

Meyer advocated for female deacons in other ways. She changed the name of a periodical she had founded in 1886, The Message, to The Deaconess Advocate; it became the official journal of the Methodist Deaconess Society and Meyer remained its editor until 1914. In 1889, she published a history of the female diaconate, Deaconesses: Biblical, Early Church, European, American. And in 1908, she founded the Methodist Deaconess Association.

Meyer resigned as principal of the Chicago Training School in 1917 and died in 1922.

In 1930, the Chicago Training School merged with the Garrett Biblical Institute in Evanston, Illinois (later known as the Garrett–Evangelical Theological Seminary).

== Publications ==
As author

- "Ho, Everyone That Is Thirsty" (1884; a hymn)
- Real Fairy Folks, or, The Fairy Land of Chemistry: Explorations in the World of Atoms (1887) - Science History Institute Digital Collections at digital.sciencehistory.org (Complete high-resolution scan of an 1887 printing, including all illustrations).
- Deaconesses: Biblical, Early Church, European, American (1889)
- Deaconesses: Who They Are and What They Do (1880s?)
- Deaconess Stories (1900)
- Mary North: A Novel (1903)

As editor

- Everybody's Gospel Songs (1910)
