= Borkwalde =

- Municipality
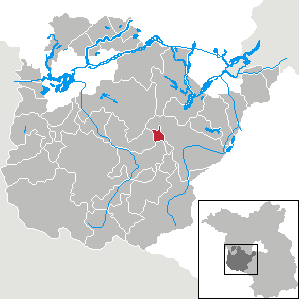
- Location of Borkwalde within Potsdam-Mittelmark district
- Interactive map of Borkwalde
- Location within Germany Location within Brandenburg
- Coordinates: 52°15′00″N 12°49′59″E
- Country: Germany
- State: Brandenburg
- District: Potsdam-Mittelmark
- Municipal assoc.: Brück

Government
  - Mayor (2024–29): Egbert Eska

Area
  - Total: 4.88 km^{2} (1.88 sq mi)
- Elevation: 62 m (203 ft)

Population (2025-12-31)
  - Total: 2,290
  - Density: 469/km^{2} (1,220/sq mi)
- Time zone: UTC+01:00 (CET)
  - Summer (DST): UTC+02:00 (CEST)
- Postal codes: 14822
- Dialling codes: 033845
- Vehicle registration: PM
- Website: www.borkwalde.de

Borkwalde is a municipality in the Potsdam-Mittelmark district, in Brandenburg, Germany.

To the west is the Truppenübungsplatz Lehnin military training area.

== Demography ==
Development of Population since 1875 within the Current Boundaries (Blue Line: Population; Dotted Line: Comparison to Population Development of Brandenburg state; Grey Background: Time of Nazi rule; Red Background: Time of Communist rule)

Borkwalde: Population development
within the current boundaries (2013)

Year	Pop.	±% p.a.
1875	30	—
1890	30	+0.00%
1910	30	+0.00%
1925	30	+0.00%
1933	240	+29.68%
1939	300	+3.79%
1946	763	+14.27%
1950	569	−7.07%
1964	580	+0.14%
1971	481	−2.64%
1981	394	−1.98%
1985	375	−1.23%
1989	379	+0.27%
1990	391	+3.17%
1991	392	+0.26%
1992	395	+0.77%
1993	432	+9.37%
1994	698	+61.57%
1995	1,068	+53.01%
1996	1,239	+16.01%

Year	Pop.	±% p.a.
1997	1,330	+7.34%
1998	1,315	−1.13%
1999	1,287	−2.13%
2000	1,351	+4.97%
2001	1,389	+2.81%
2002	1,362	−1.94%
2003	1,397	+2.57%
2004	1,472	+5.37%
2005	1,529	+3.87%
2006	1,544	+0.98%
2007	1,548	+0.26%
2008	1,576	+1.81%
2009	1,569	−0.44%
2010	1,564	−0.32%
2011	1,480	−5.37%
2012	1,455	−1.69%
2013	1,459	+0.27%
2014	1,487	+1.92%
2015	1,496	+0.61%
2016	1,487	−0.60%
