= Cecilia Blomqvist =

Finnish deaconess

Cecilia Blomqvist (8 September 1845, Björneborg - 7 December 1910, Helsinki), known as Sister Cecilia, was a Finnish deaconess. In 1877, she became the first deaconess in Finland and a pioneer in her profession. She is mentioned along with Aurora Karamzin and Mathilda Wrede as one of the most prominent philanthropists in her contemporary Finland.

== Life ==
Cecilia Blomqvist was the daughter of a rich sea captain in Pori. Her mother and the first of her two stepmothers died early, and while still young, she was given the responsibility of her younger sister. In the 1860s, she became involved in local charitable activity. During the Famine of 1866-68, she nursed the sick and starving and found homes for orphans. She nursed her father until his death from cancer in 1873.

In 1873-77, Blomqvist studied at the Deaconess institute of Amanda Cajander in Helsinki, becoming the first Finnish deaconess educated in Finland in 1877. In 1879, she served as deaconess of Raumo, becoming the first deaconess employed by the Finnish church. In 1883, she was appointed to found the charitable Helsinki Stadsmission for the poor. In 1889, she was the first Finnish woman to become a civil servant, which caused a law reform allowing women to become civil servants.

== See also ==
- Anna Broms
