= Neuendorf (Brück) =

Coordinates: 52°12′03″N 12°49′30″E

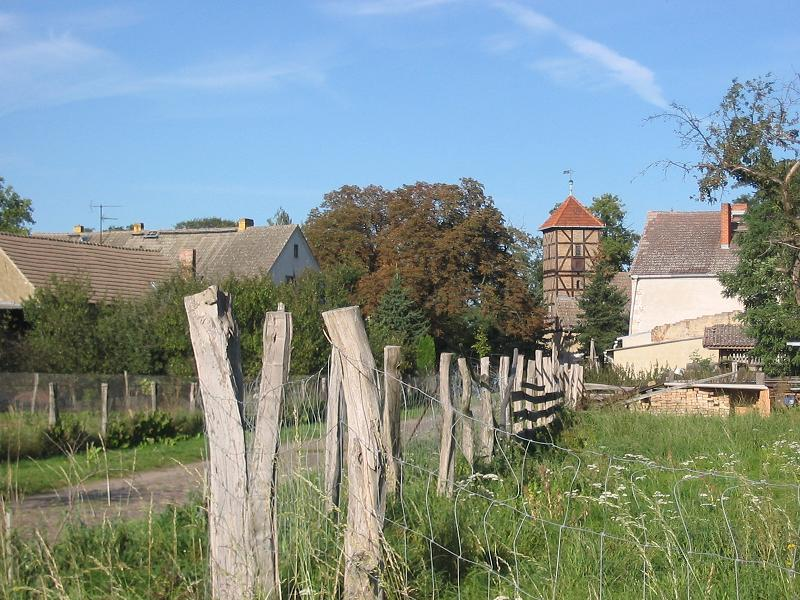
Neuendorf

Neuendorf (German pronunciation: [ˈnɔʏəndɔʁf]) is a district of Brück in the Brandenburg district Potsdam-Mittelmark.

The village has 257 inhabitants (2015), and lies on the federal road 246 on the border of the Zauche plateau to the Glogau-Baruther Urstromtal. To the north is the Truppenübungsplatz Lehnin military training area. Northeast is the municipality Borkheide. To the southeast are the villages Alt Bork and Deusche Bork. The main town of Brück is roughly 3km west along the B246 road.

== History ==
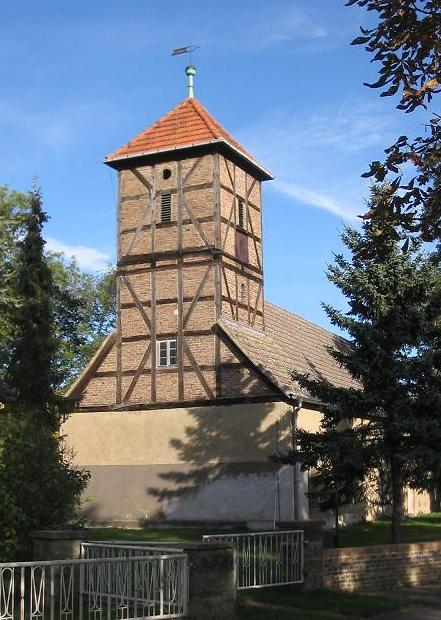
Church with half-timbered tower

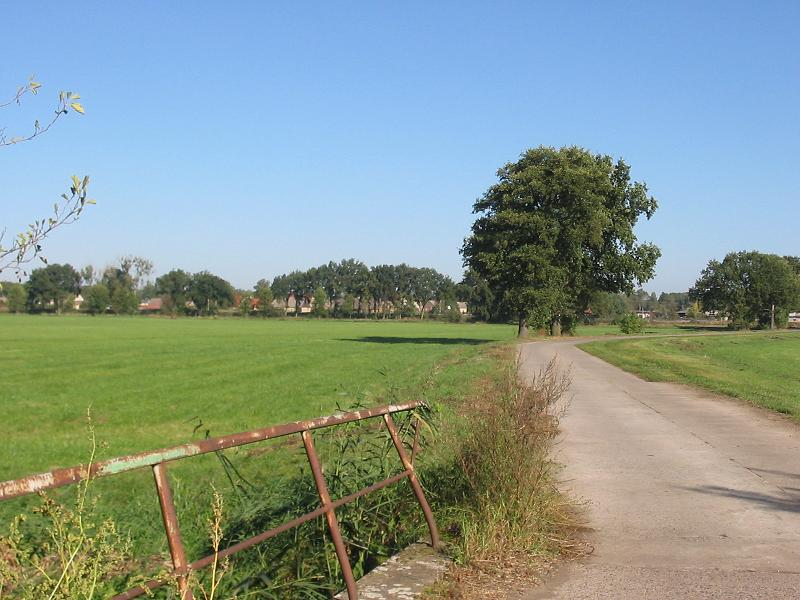
Road to the Baruther Urstromtal

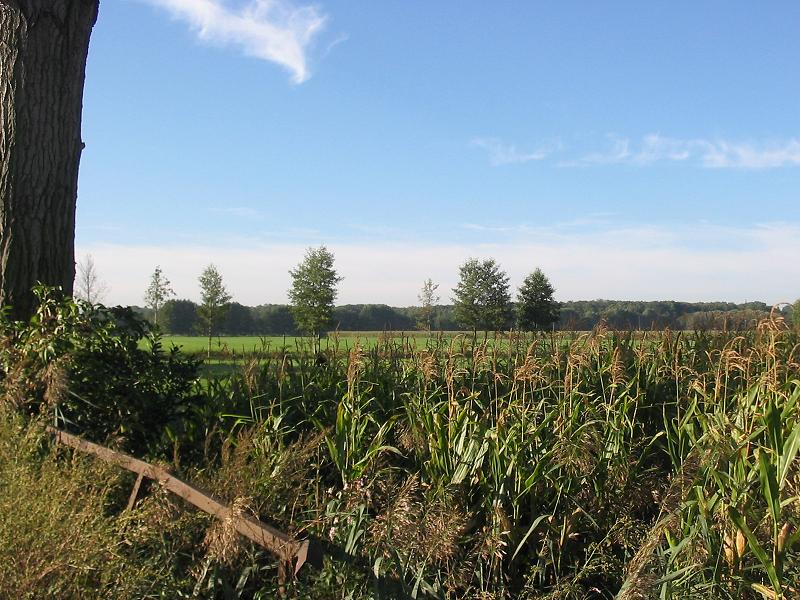
View of the rest of the Linther Oberbuschs

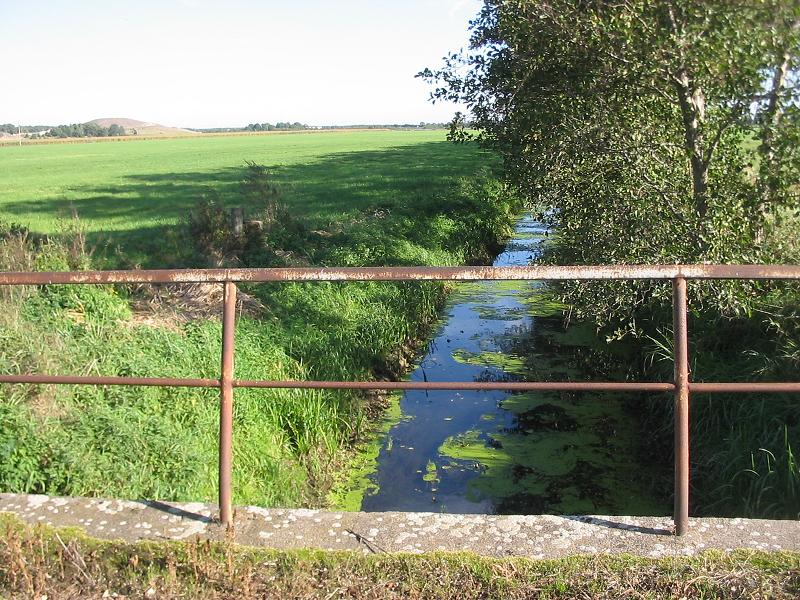
Land development

The first documented mention of Neuendorf dates from 1337 as Nyendorf, and by 1375 the village is listed as "Nyendorf prope Brugge". The village was owned by the Ritter family of Ziegesar until 1582. From 1599 to 1690 it belonged to the family of Bernewitz.

Until 1815, Neuendorf was of great importance for Brandenburg, since the village was the last border post in the Märkische Zauche in the direction of Saxony. It was only with the Congress of Vienna in 1815 that the northern part of the Saxon spa district, to which Brück and Belzig had belonged, finally fell to Prussia.

Neuendorf has always been agricultural. With the extensive melioration measures under Frederick the Great in the Baruther Urstromtal, the Neuendorfer farmers started to gain wealth; they had previously had to lay their fields on the sandy, dry, and rather barren land of the Zauche, and from the middle of the eighteenth century onwards they had been able to shift their cultivated lands into the overgrown and fertile valley. Remains of the formerly extensive Erlenbruch forest between Neuendorf, Stromtal, and Bundesautobahn 9, along with a variety of drainage channels, remind today of the swampy lowland.

The relatively high prosperity of the farmers during this time was reflected in the fact that in 1795, when the highly indebted estate was to be auctioned in Neuendorf, the villagers provided the highest bid with 26,000 Thaler.

The village church has a bell dating from 1690. The tower was erected in 1839 and a renovation took place in 1890.
