= Chicago Training School for Home and Foreign Missions =

Coordinates: 41°48′14.8″N 87°37′10.0″W

Chicago Training School for Home and Foreign Missions was a training school in Chicago for missionaries associated with the Methodist Church. It was founded by Lucy Rider Meyer and her husband Josiah in 1885 and was described as "the largest training school of its kind in the country" and awarded the degree of Bachelor of Religious Service (BRS).

Norman Wait Harris, a Chicago bank executive, was president of the school's board of trustees and donated land and buildings to the school.

In 1930, the school was merged into the Garrett Biblical Institute in Evanston, Illinois, which later became the Garrett–Evangelical Theological Seminary.

== History ==
Founded in 1885, the Chicago Training School was started in order to educate and train women for Christian service and ministry. The school grew out of the Methodist deaconess movement and gave preparation for missionary work in "city, home, and foreign fields". It was run by Lucy Rider Meyer, and her husband Josiah Shelley Meyer. The school was built "to educate Christian lay-women as leaders and social service agents in ministry by serving the needs of the city". These women became known as deaconesses. Deaconesses nursed the sick in hospitals and poor areas of the city. They worked as missionaries and assistants to pastors, in orphanages and schools. The deaconess uniform, designed by Lucy Jane Rider, consisted of black dresses with white collars, worn with black bonnets. They were meant to be "simple for reasons of economy and protection as well as to identify the women as deaconesses". After their training at the school, the women who "trained in the school are engaged as missionaries in India, Japan, and China...smaller numbers are in South America, Africa, Jamaica, The West Indies, and Mexico". Once they returned home they continued working for churches and Sunday schools nearby.

Deaconesses at this time, such as Rider herself, advocated for women and cared for the ill and poor communities of the city. At this time in history, women were not allowed to be ordained, therefore, The Chicago Training School "was a huge force in preparing Methodist and other Christian women for a whole range of important and effective ministries that helped transform the church's relationship with societies around the world". This education for these women and its importance is what drove the Deaconess movement that Lucy Jane Rider became known to lead. Throughout the time the School ran, "the Chicago Training School educated 500 foreign missionaries and over 4000 were consecrated to Christian service at home".

== Lucy Jane Rider (1849-1922) ==
Lucy Jane Rider-Meyer was born in New Haven, Vermont in 1849. Her parents were Richard D. and Jane Rider. After she graduated from New Hampton Institute, she was admitted to Oberlin college in 1870, graduating in 1872 with a degree and diploma. Oberlin College was the first to administer degrees to women for their education. Lucy Rider spent years attending, teaching and instructing at schools up until 1885 when she married Josiah Shelley Meyer. Instead of bringing her ideas down, he defended "her school's curriculum that included biblical studies, theology, church history, sociology, economics, basic medical training, and courses chronicling the accomplishments of women" (bu.edu). About five months after they married, the Chicago Training School for City, Home, and Foreign Missions was opened. Lucy was the principal of the school for thirty-two years and then president until 1922. She was an American Social worker and educator whose activity within the Methodist church was aimed at training and organizing workers to provide health and social services for the poor, the elderly, and children (illinois.edu). During the deaconess movement, she became "the most widely known and most influential of the women leaders of the Methodist Episcopal Church" (illinois.edu). During her term, "Meyer trained more than 5,000 students, and with the graduates, initiated the development of 40 institutions including schools, hospitals, orphanages, old people's homes, and deaconess homes" (illinois.edu). After writing many books, she died on March 16, 1922, in Chicago. By the end of her career and life, she would be known as the "Archbishop Of Deaconesses" or the Mother of the deaconess movement (bu.edu).

== Notable alumni ==
- Minnie F. Abrams (1859-1912), missionary to India
- Bertha Fowler (class of 1888), educator, preacher, deaconess
