= Willis Collins Hoover Kurt =

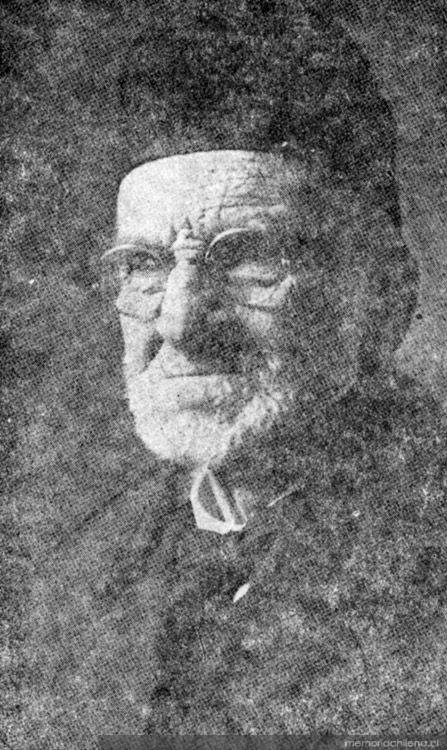
Willis C. Hoover

Willis Collins Hoover Kurt (July 20, 1858 – May 26, 1936) was an American Methodist Episcopal Church missionary and became a founding pastor of the Church of Chile and the Chilean Pentecostal movement. He taught in the English college in the city of Iquique. In 1902, his leaders had him take over a pastorate in Valparaiso. During a period of great spiritual renewal among members of the church, Rev. Hoover received the Baptism with the Holy Spirit. The church and region experienced lengthy revival. Two large Pentecostal groups were formed by many people, as well as a number of smaller groups.

He was born in Freeport, Illinois.
