= Kloster Lehnin =

- Municipality
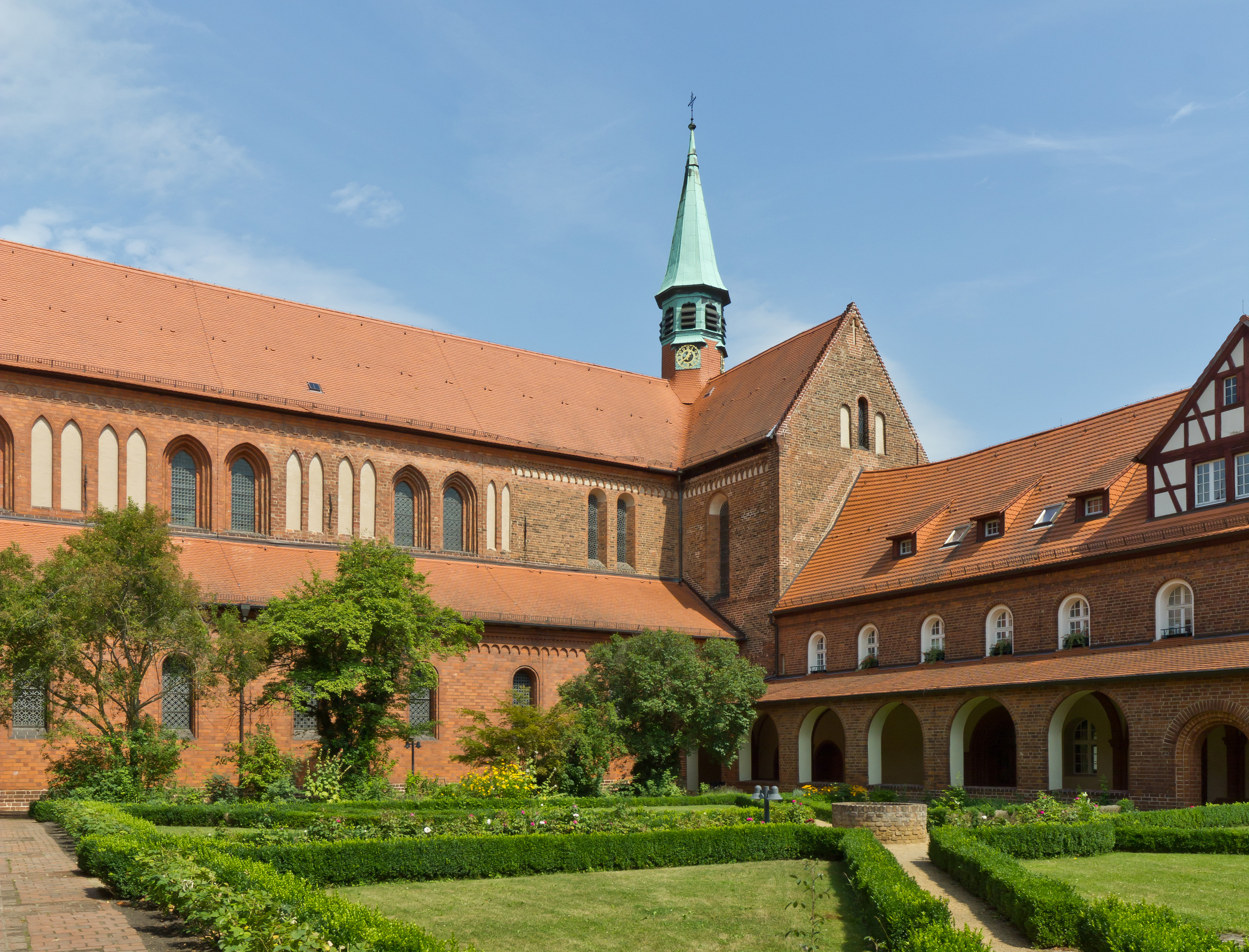

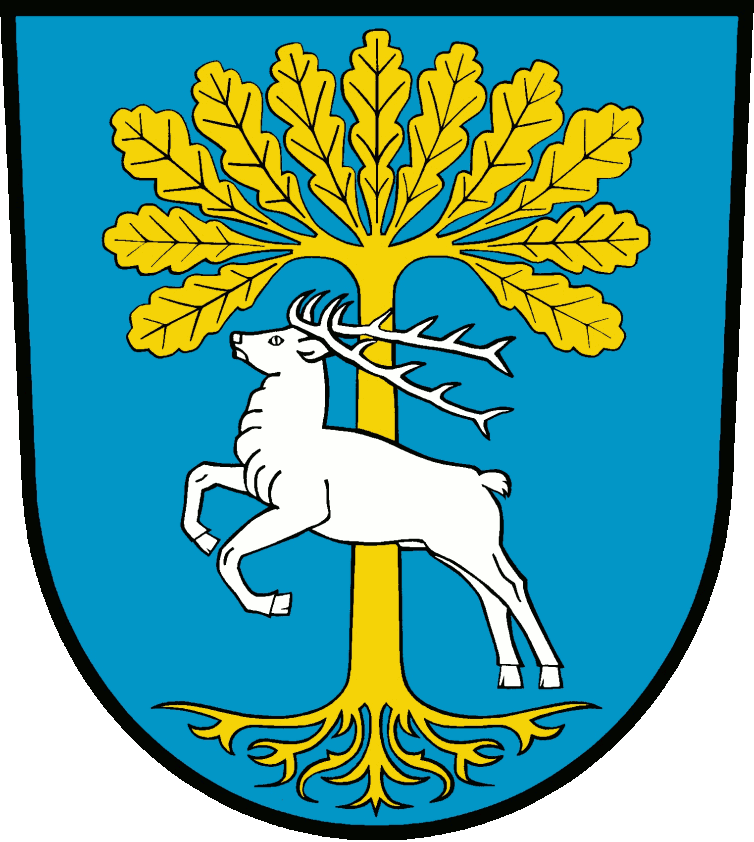
- Coat of arms

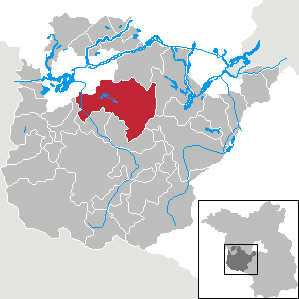
- Location of Kloster Lehnin within Potsdam-Mittelmark district
- Interactive map of Kloster Lehnin
- Location within Germany Location within Brandenburg
- Coordinates: 52°19′00″N 12°45′00″E
- Country: Germany
- State: Brandenburg
- District: Potsdam-Mittelmark
- Subdivisions: 14 Ortsteile

Government
  - Mayor (2024–32): Uwe Brückner

Area
  - Total: 199.30 km^{2} (76.95 sq mi)
- Elevation: 36 m (118 ft)

Population (2025-12-31)
  - Total: 11,243
  - Density: 56.412/km^{2} (146.11/sq mi)
- Time zone: UTC+01:00 (CET)
  - Summer (DST): UTC+02:00 (CEST)
- Postal codes: 14542, 14778, 14797
- Dialling codes: 03382, 033207
- Vehicle registration: PM
- Website: www.lehnin.de

Kloster Lehnin, or just Lehnin, is a municipality in the German state of Brandenburg. It lies about 24 km (15 mi) west-south-west of Potsdam.

== Overview ==
Kloster Lehnin was established on 1 April 2002 by the merger of 14 villages:

- Damsdorf
- Emstal (Schwina until 1937)
- Göhlsdorf
- Grebs
- Krahne
- Lehnin
- Michelsdorf
- Nahmitz
- Netzen
- Prützke
- Rädel
- Reckahn
- Rietz and
- Trechwitz, incorporated on 26 October 2003

The centre of the municipality is Lehnin. It is best known for Lehnin Abbey, the oldest monastery in the Margraviate of Brandenburg, established in 1180 by Margrave Otto I. The adjacent settlement developed about 1415 out of a market held by the monks outside the abbey walls.

Today, this well-maintained area includes the renovated monastery church and other Gothic buildings.

In addition to tourism, Kloster Lehnin's local economy is supported primarily by

- the Evangelical Deaconess House Berlin Teltow Lehnin, a hospital network
- Hansa-Heemann AG, a mineral water and soft drinks company
- Grand River Enterprise, a cigarette company
- Windeck, a metal construction company.

All of these companies are established in the industrial area, Rietz.

== Demography ==
Development of population since 1875 within the current Boundaries (Blue Line: Population; Dotted Line: Comparison to Population development in Brandenburg state; Grey Background: Time of Nazi Germany; Red Background: Time of communist East Germany)

Recent Population Development and Projections (Population Development before Census 2011 (blue line); Recent Population Development according to the Census in Germany in 2011 (blue bordered line); Official projections for 2005-2030 (yellow line); for 2017-2030 (scarlet line); for 2020-2030 (green line)

Kloster Lehnin: Population development
within the current boundaries (2020)

| Year | Pop. | ±% p.a. |
|---|---|---|
| 1875 | 8,142 | — |
| 1890 | 9,562 | +1.08% |
| 1910 | 10,153 | +0.30% |
| 1925 | 9,924 | −0.15% |
| 1939 | 11,651 | +1.15% |
| 1950 | 13,891 | +1.61% |
| 1964 | 11,800 | −1.16% |

| Year | Pop. | ±% p.a. |
|---|---|---|
| 1971 | 11,504 | −0.36% |
| 1981 | 10,921 | −0.52% |
| 1985 | 11,173 | +0.57% |
| 1990 | 10,864 | −0.56% |
| 1995 | 10,996 | +0.24% |
| 2000 | 11,586 | +1.05% |
| 2005 | 11,700 | +0.20% |

| Year | Pop. | ±% p.a. |
|---|---|---|
| 2010 | 11,089 | −1.07% |
| 2015 | 10,720 | −0.67% |
| 2016 | 10,903 | +1.71% |
| 2017 | 10,848 | −0.50% |
| 2018 | 10,871 | +0.21% |
| 2019 | 10,894 | +0.21% |
| 2020 | 10,971 | +0.71% |

== Notable people ==
- Roland Kaiser (1943–1998), actor
- Waltraud Kretzschmar (1948–2018), handball player
- Wolfgang Schmidt (*1966), serial killer

== Photogallery ==
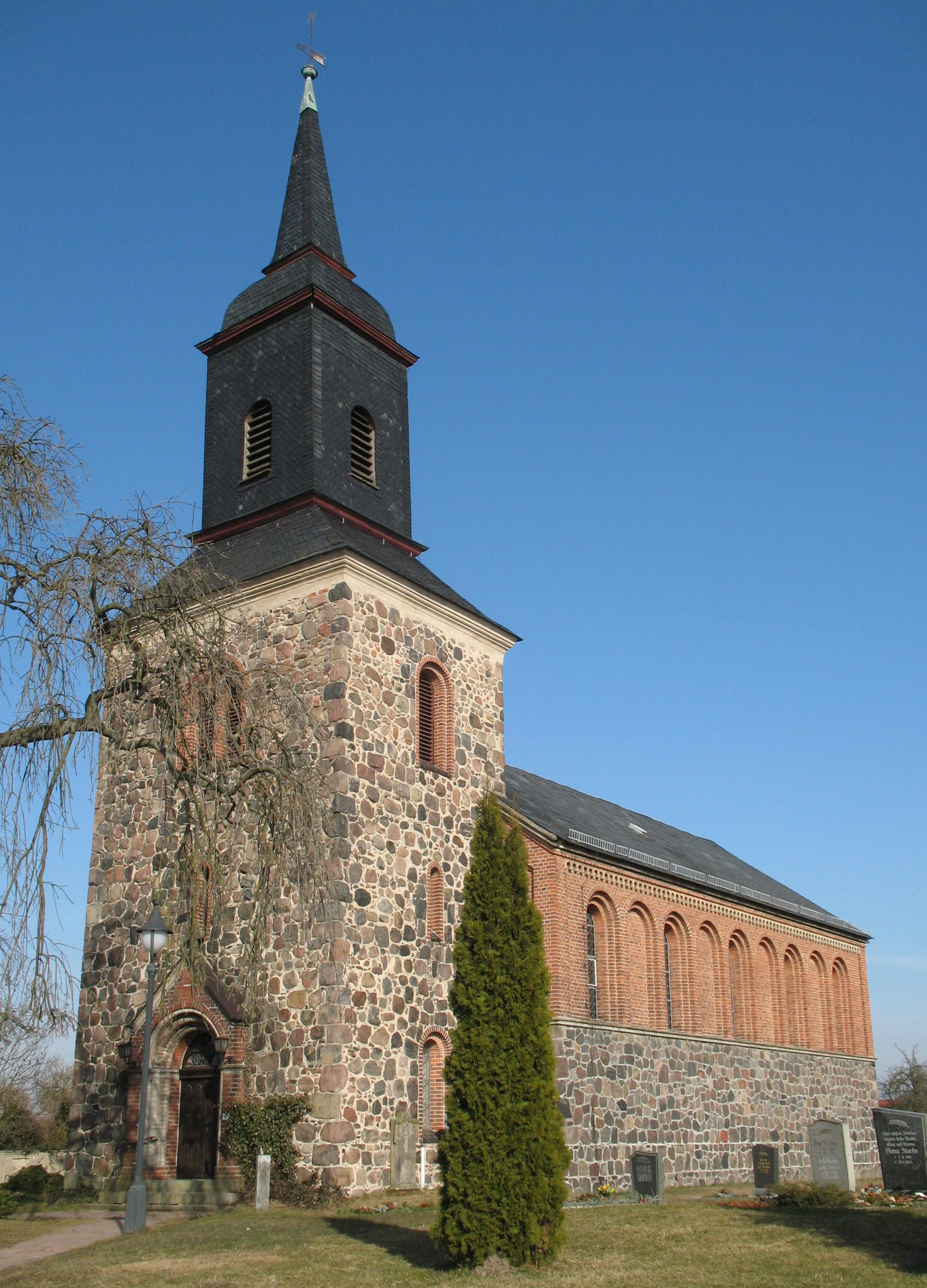
Church in Göhlsdorf

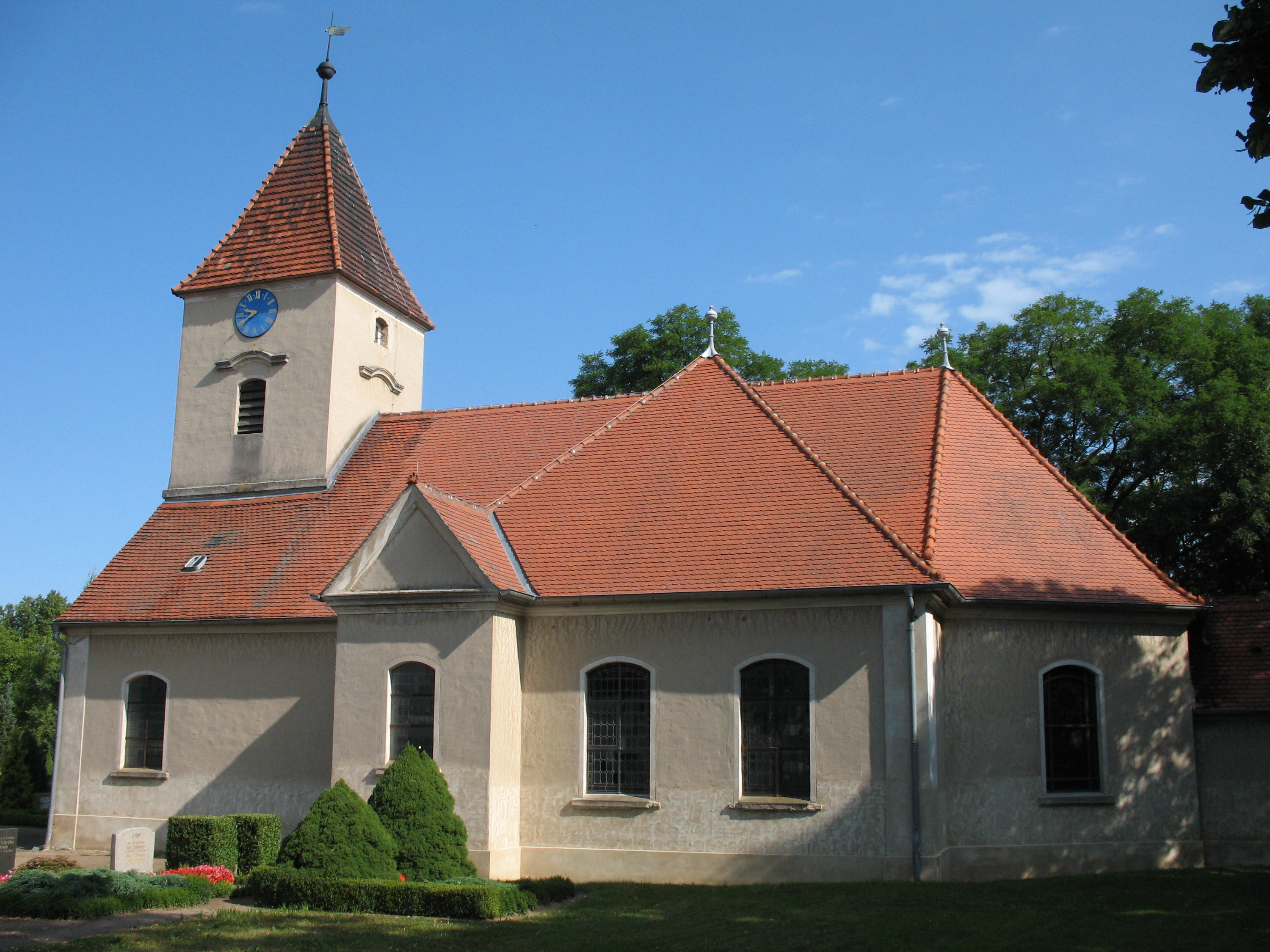
Church in Krahne

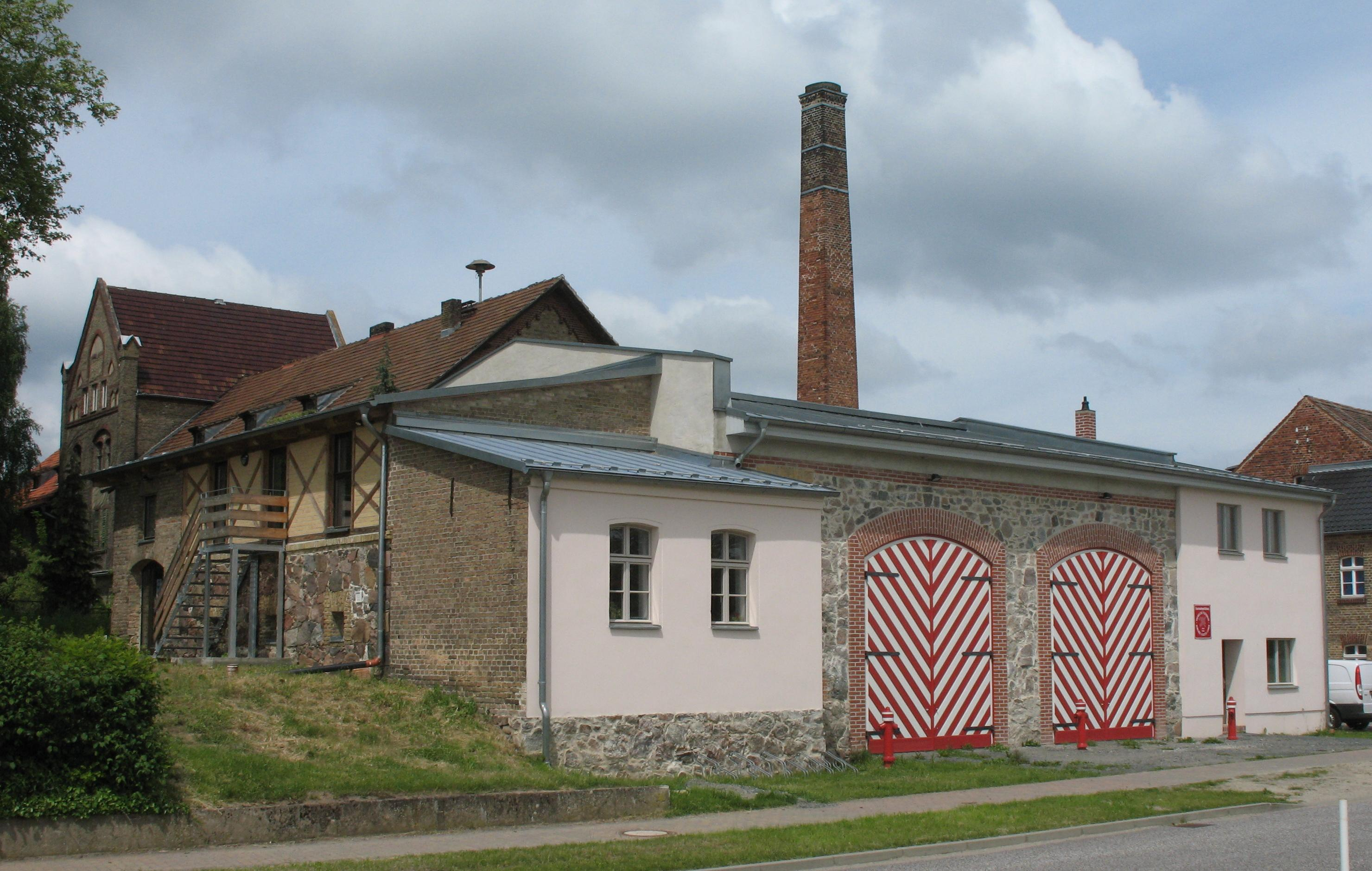
Manor house and fire station in Krahne

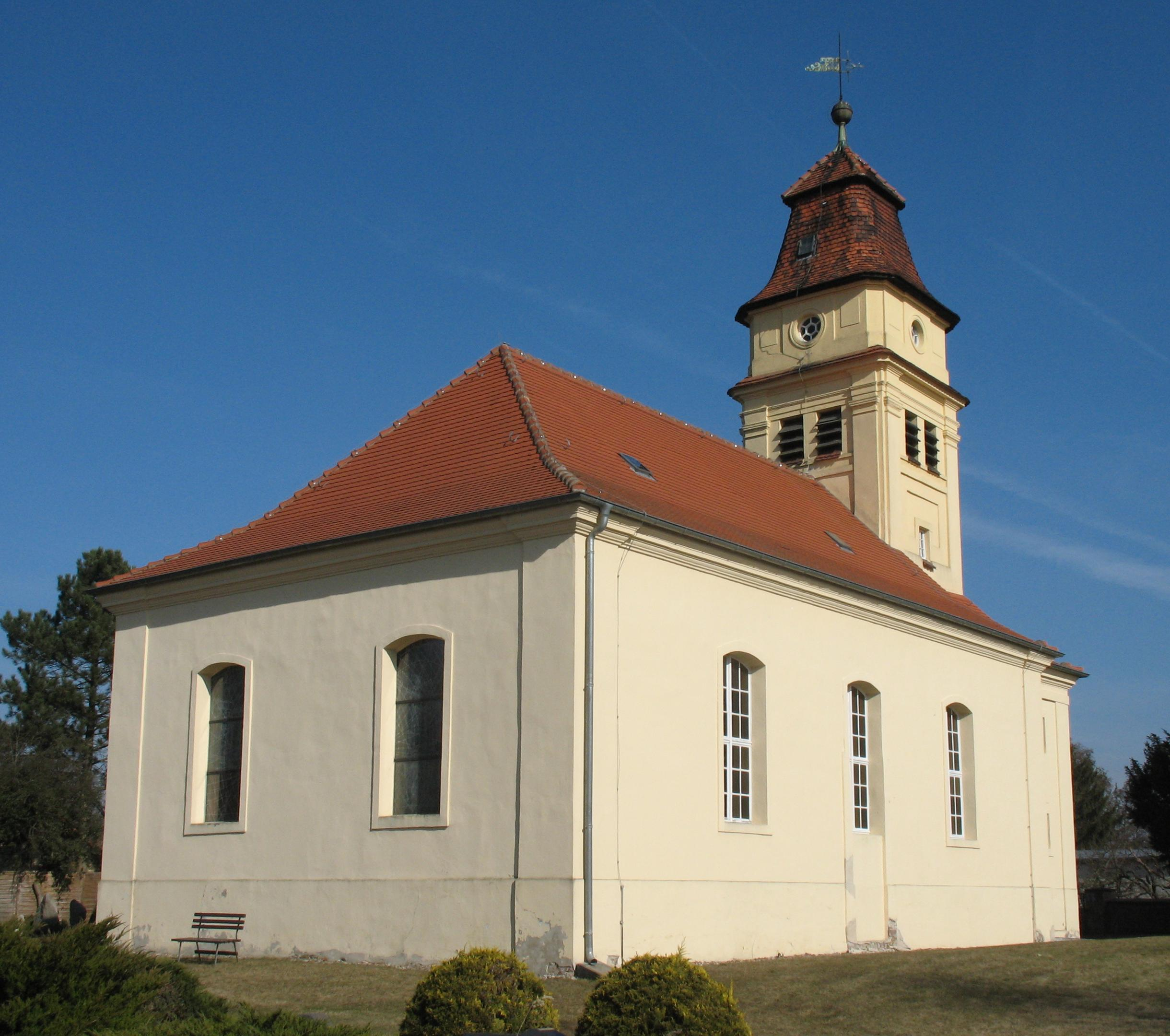
Church in Rädel

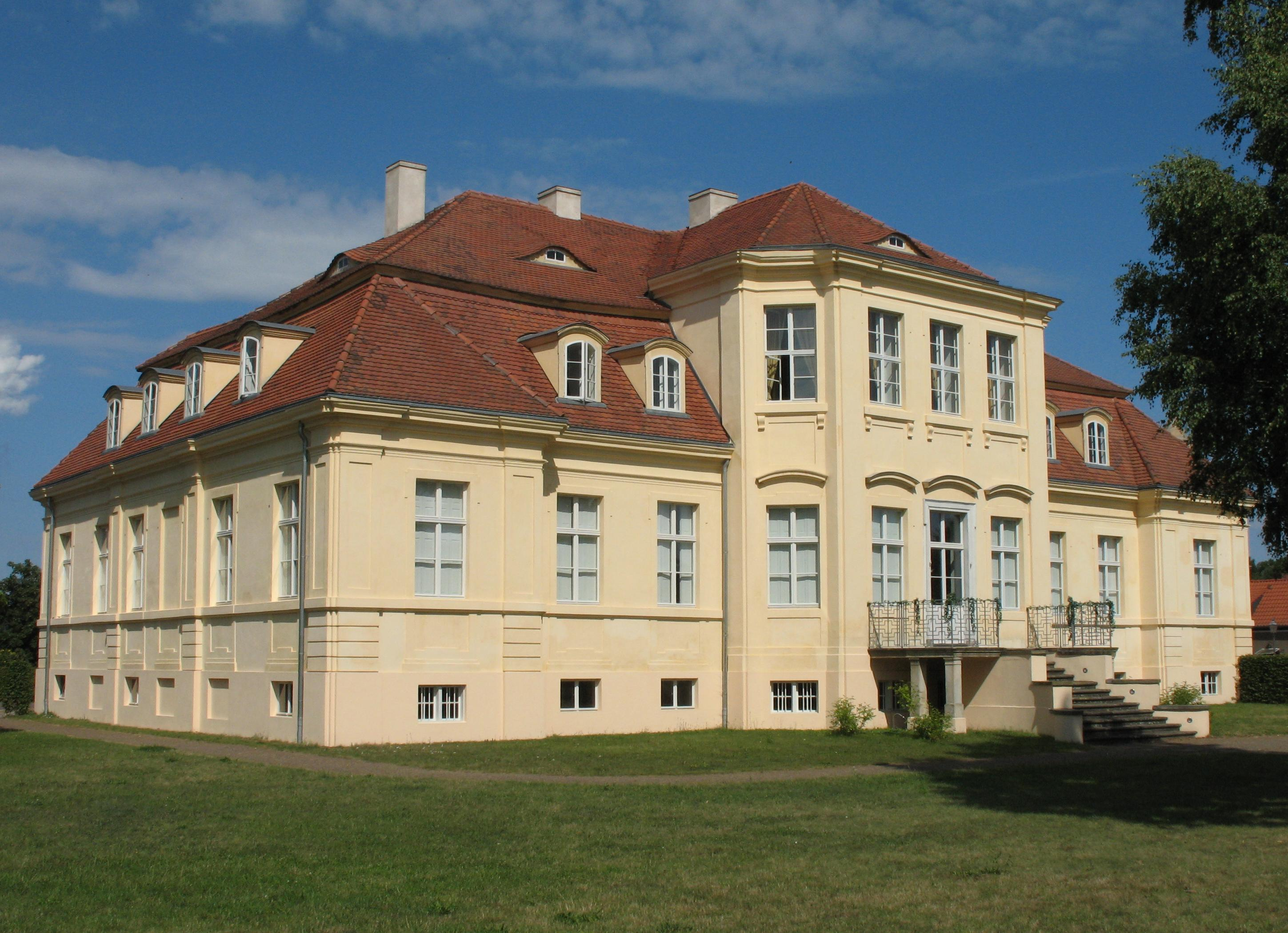
Manor house in Reckahn

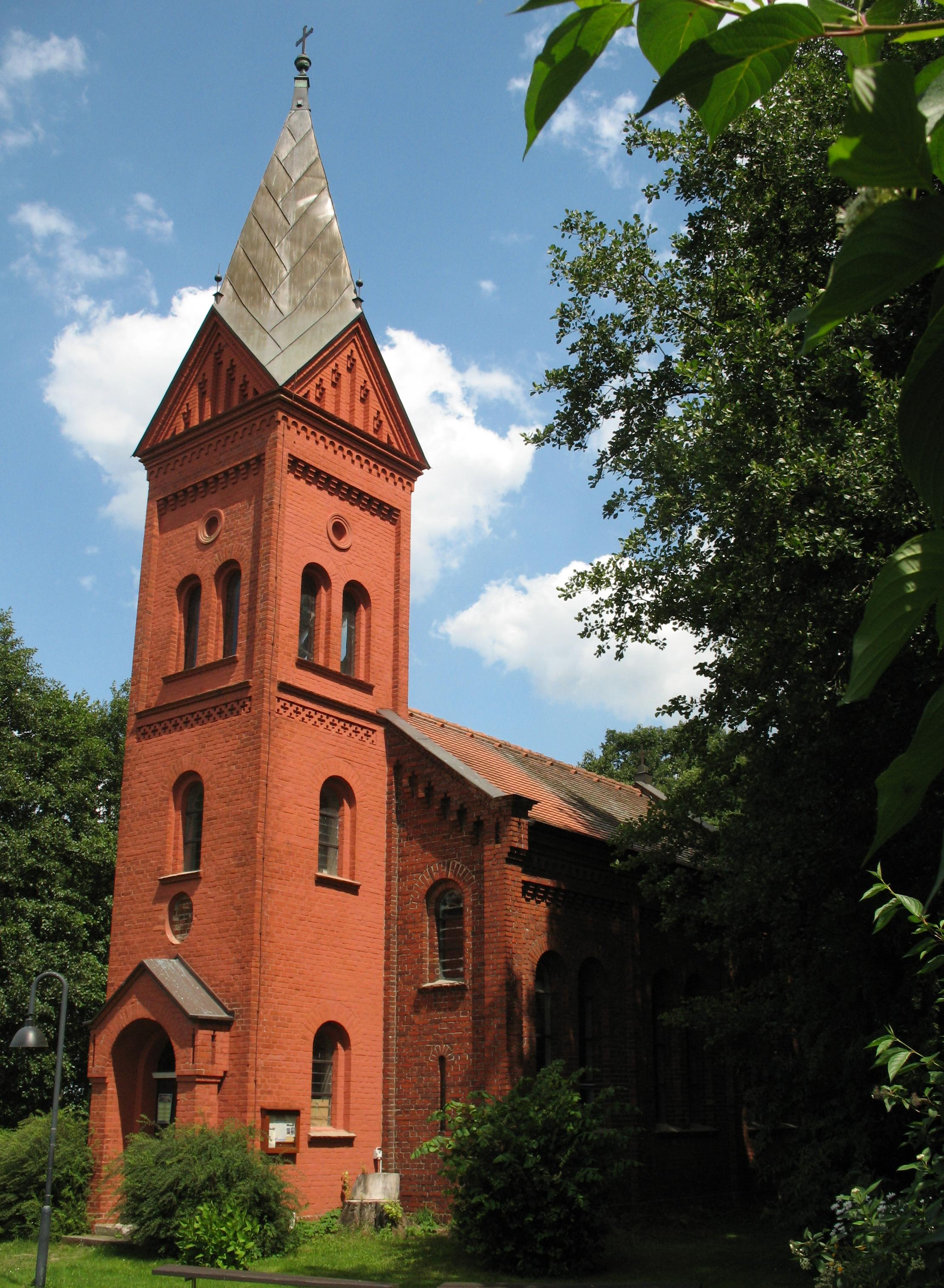
Church in Reckahn-Meßdunk

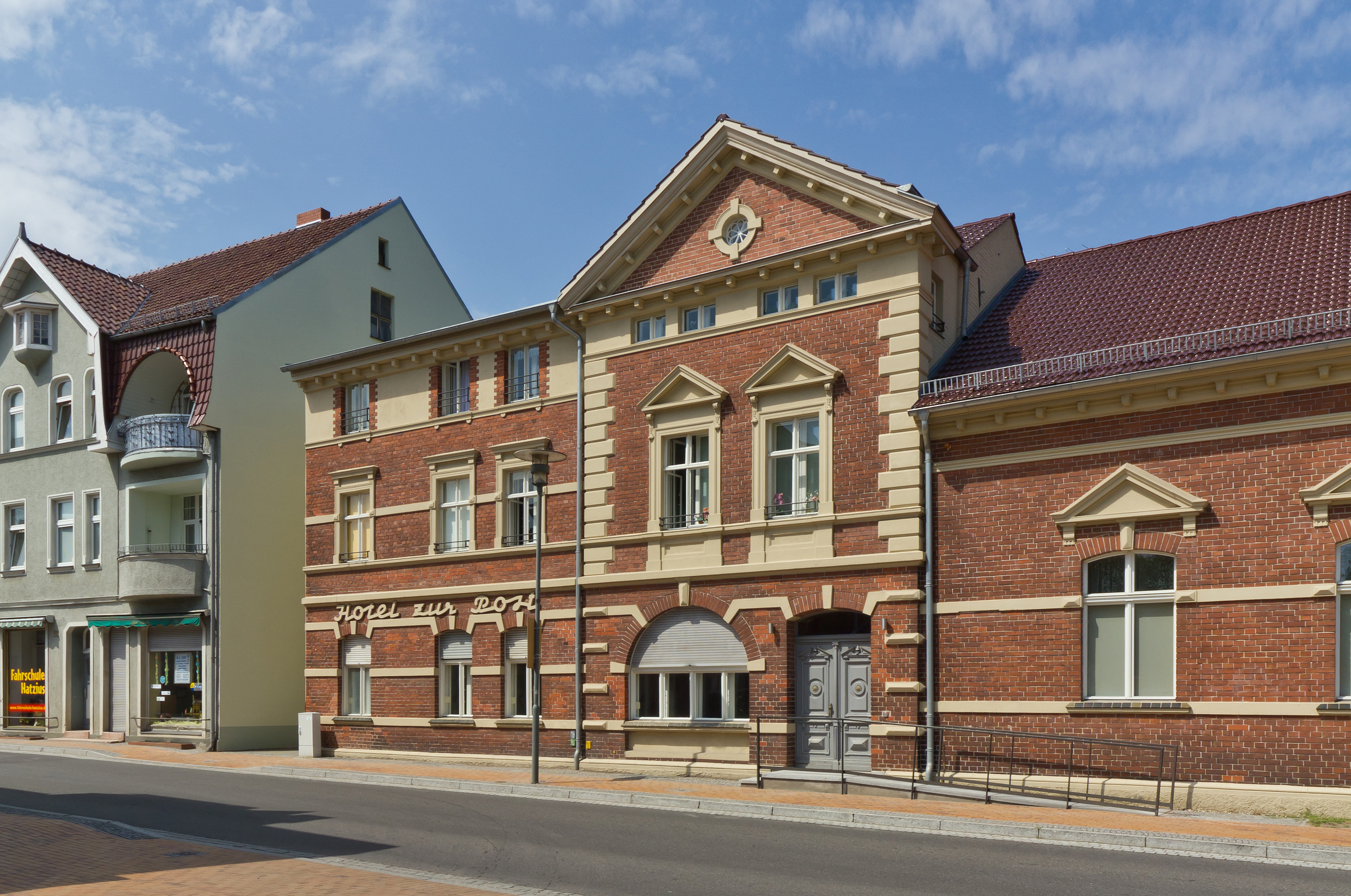
Listed hotel building in Lehnin

== See also ==
- Klostersee
- Lehnin Abbey
