= Peter Hafftiz =

German educator and historiographer

Peter Hafftiz (also Haftiz; Petrus Haftitius, Hafftitius, c. 1525 – c. 1601) was a German educator and historiographer. From 1550 he was teacher at the schools of St. Nicolai and St. Marien in Berlin, from 1560 as rector. He received Berlin citizenship in 1564. From 1577 to 1580 he was rector in the public school of Cölln.

His major work is a chronicle of the Margraviate of Brandenburg, probably begun after 1593, which is in part based on the earlier chronicles of Engelbert Wusterwitz and Andreas Angelus. The chronicle is extant in a number of manuscripts in his hand, under various titles, among others Microchronicon Marchium, and in a number of later manuscript copies.

Minor works by Hafftiz include De vita et obitu Joachimi II. S. R. I. archicamerarii [...] ac d. Johannis fratris march. Br. (1571), Liber de extremo iudicio (1576), Ecloga in obitum Augusti el. Saxoniae (1586), Tractat vom Adel u. dessen Ursprung (1587 manuscript).

Hafftiz' Microchronicon Marchium was edited in 1862, from a manuscript beginning with the year 1411, in Riedel's Codex Diplomaticus Brandenburgensis (vol. IV.1, pp. 46–168).

== Sources ==
- Schultze, Johannes, "Hafftiz, Peter" in: Neue Deutsche Biographie 7 (1966), 463f. (deutsche-biographie.de)
- Rudolf Schwarze (1879). "Hafftiz, Peter" . Allgemeine Deutsche Biographie (in German). Vol. 10. Leipzig: Duncker & Humblot. pp. 320–321.
- Friedrich Holtze, 'Die Berolinensien des Peter Hafftiz', Schriften des Vereins für die Geschichte Berlins 31, Berlin, 1894.
