= Engelbert Wusterwitz =

Engelbert Wusterwitz (c. 1385–1433) was a chronicler of the history of the Margraviate of Brandenburg. He wrote during the time when the House of Hohenzollern, the dynasty of the later kings of Prussia, gained rulership over Brandenburg.

Born in Brandenburg to a family originally from Wusterwitz, Engelbert studied at the University of Erfurt in 1404 and at the University of Prague in 1406/7. He worked as a clerk and jurist in Brandenburg and Magdeburg. In Magdeburg, the Schöppenchronik is continued in his hand for the period of 1411 to 1421. In 1427, he was in the service of the bishop of Halberstadt. His own chronicle covered the period of 1391 to 1423. During this time, Frederick VI, Burgrave of Nuremberg of the House of Hohenzollern, was appointed governor of Brandenburg in order to restore order and stability amid excessive feuds between the nobility and later elevated to the rank of Elector and Margrave of Brandenburg as Frederick I. Engelbert supported Frederick and was critical of the feudal quarrels of the local nobility.

The text survives only in excerpts quoted by the 16th-century chroniclers Andreas Angelus and Peter Hafftiz. A reconstruction of the text was presented by Ribbe (1973). Earlier printed editions are found in Riedel, Codex diplomaticus Brandenburgensis IV.1 (1862), Heidemann (1878) and Tschirch (1912).
