= Golzower Busch =

Forest in Germany

Coordinates: 52°15′0″N 12°37′0″E

Golzower Busch is a forest in the south of the territory of Golzow in the county of Potsdam-Mittelmark in the German state of Brandenburg. It extends from the B 102 federal highway in the northwest, running towards the southeast for about four kilometres. Its maximum width is one kilometre.
