= Franz Ziegler =

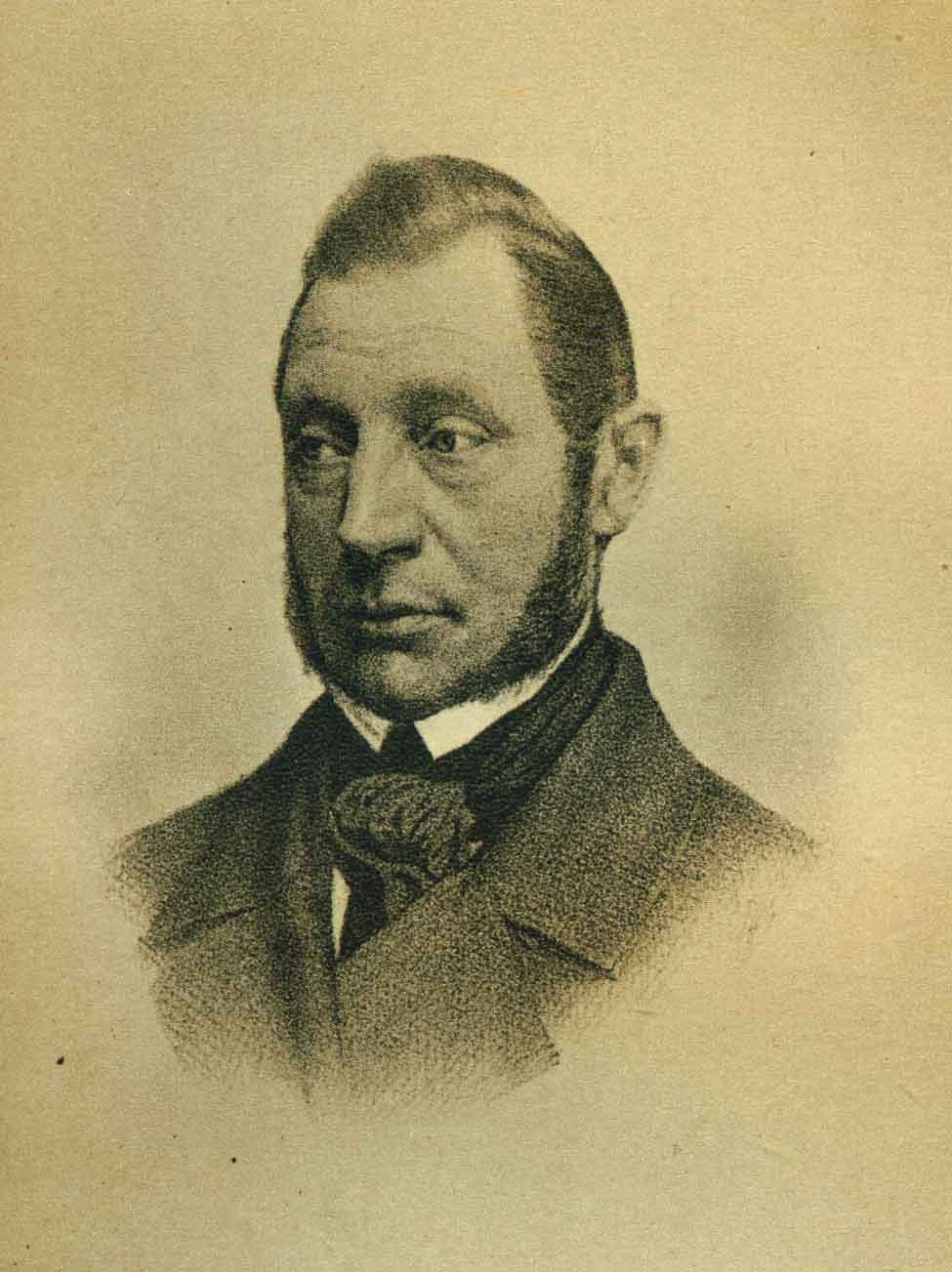
- Franz Ziegler Philipp Graff 1848
- Born: Franz Wilhelm Ziegler; 2 December 1803; Warchau, Duchy of Magdeburg, Prussia
- Died: 1 October 1876; Berlin, Germany
- Occupations: Lawyer politician writer
- Political party: Progressive Party
- Spouse: Wilhelmine Charlotte Butt(?)
- Children: Franziska Ziegler / von Béguelin (1828–1892)

Franz Wilhelm Ziegler (3 February 1803 – 1 October 1876) was a lawyer, politician and writer.

In 1848 he was a member of the Prussian National Assembly that emerged as part of the democratic revolutionary movement of the time, and in 1849 he was sentenced to a prison term because of his support for a motion of refusal to pay a supplementary tax to fund military expansion. As the Prussian state moved hesitantly towards a version of parliamentary democracy, Ziegler sat as a member of parliament. He was an early member of the Progressive Party, but differed with it in 1866 over the issue of war with Austria.

== Life ==
Ziegler was born in Warchau, at that time a hamlet separated by a series of marshes and lakes from Brandenburg an der Havel nearby. He was the thirteenth recorded child of the local Protestant minister. He attended secondary school at Brandenburg and went on to study Jurisprudence (Law) at Halle, qualifying and then working as a lawyer. In 1839 or 1840, on the recommendation of the town council, the king appointed Ziegler to the office of Lord Mayor of Brandenburg. He proved a superb organiser, displaying perhaps the greatest administrative talent of any state officer in Prussia.

As Lord Mayor he lost little time in issuing a set of guidelines and protocols on how the municipal officials and councillors should conduct their work, setting out clear divisions between different areas of responsibility, and rules for the timely implementation of duties. By streamlining the municipal police force he restored much needed order on the streets. He implemented national strategy by setting up a "Forced Labour Institution" (a so-called "poor house"), and through strict supervision of the work-shy he succeeded in clearing the streets of beggars and whores. He then turned his attention to sorting out the municipal finances. His reforms of municipal taxation included the first imposition in German of a progressive income tax and earned him denunciations and enduring enmity from members of the town council. From collection of the simplified municipal income tax he was able to finance a communal system of poor relief.

In 1844 Franz Ziegler became the first Lord Mayor in Prussia to publish municipal budgets, giving rise to the possibility of a certain level of public verification. This made the municipal administration accountable to the people on whose behalf it operated. The first open meeting of the town council took place at Ziegler's instigation on 11 February 1848, enabling the councillors to interact with members of the public.

In 1848 Ziegler was a member of the short-lived Prussian National Assembly, and in 1849 he was elected to the second chamber of the Prussian House of Representatives (as the second chamber of the country's new parliament later came to be known), where for most purposes he occupied a position on the moderate left. There were two members representing the Brandenburg constituency: Ziegler was one and the other was the future Chancellor, Otto von Bismarck.

As a member of the second chamber in 1849 Ziegler voted in support of "taxation rejection". Context for the vote involved a liberal majority in the Second Chamber refusing to vote for a supplementary income tax which the king wished to levy in order to fund increased military spending in the wake of the 1848 revolutions, the democratising impact of which he was keen to restrict. Despite being rejected by the vote in the assembly, the supplementary tax was levied anyway, and the subservience of the new parliament was thereby asserted. Further demonstration of government supremacy came when Franz Ziegler was charged with High treason and Sedition. Even though a majority in the assembly had voted down the supplementary tax, Ziegler was the only assembly member to face indictment, apparently because he had been the one who had proposed the motion rejecting the tax. He was convicted, deprived of his public offices, and sentenced to a prison term which he served in Magdeburg. The terms of his sentence also included exclusion from his home region, the voting district of Brandenburg for a further year following his release, and accordingly he now moved to Berlin where through hard work he was able to restore his fortunes. He also became a writer, publishing poems as well as books on social and political themes. It was only in 1855 that he was able to return to his family in Brandenburg.

An amnesty in 1861 opened the way for a resumption of his career in politics, and between 1865 and 1870 Ziegler was back as a member of the Prussian House of Representatives, this time representing Breslau. In August 1867 he was elected to the Reichstag of the newly established North German Confederation, representing Breslau-West on behalf of the Progressive Party. In 1866 he found himself at odds with the mainstream party over his support for the war with Austria. He was not one of those who formally broke away from the party, but after this his conduct in the Reichstag was increasingly independent, while his contributions were chiefly on matters such as taxation which, within the party, were relatively uncontentious. Following unification, in 1871 and again in 1874 he was re-elected to the Reichstag, still as a Progressive Party member representing Breslau-West.

== Family ==
Sources mention that Franz Ziegler had a wife and family, but are for the most part silent on their names. The exception is his daughter Franziska von Béguelin (1828–1892) who, following her brief marriage, became a published author herself. She expended time and energy trying to persuade someone with the appropriate political insights to produce a biography of her father, but she was unsuccessful. She did, however, have a 260-page book of his principal speeches published.
