= Beetzsee (Amt) =

- Amt
- Map of Potsdam-Mittelmark highlighting Beetzsee
- Interactive map of Beetzsee
- Location within Germany Location within Brandenburg
- Coordinates: 52°27′N 12°32′E
- Country: Germany
- State: Brandenburg
- District: Potsdam-Mittelmark
- Seat: Beetzsee
- Subdivisions: 5 municipalities

Area
  - Total: 203.77 km^{2} (78.68 sq mi)

Population (2025-12-31)
  - Total: 8,322
  - Density: 40.84/km^{2} (105.8/sq mi)
- Time zone: UTC+01:00 (CET)
  - Summer (DST): UTC+02:00 (CEST)
- Website: www.amt-beetzsee.de

Amt Beetzsee is an Amt ("collective municipality") in the district of Potsdam-Mittelmark, in Brandenburg, Germany. Its seat is in Beetzsee-Brielow. Its name refers to the lake Beetzsee.

The Amt Beetzsee consists of the following municipalities:

1. Beetzsee
2. Beetzseeheide
3. Havelsee
4. Päwesin
5. Roskow

== Demography ==
Development of population since 1875 within the current Boundaries (Blue Line: Population; Dotted Line: Comparison to Population development in Brandenburg state; Grey Background: Time of Nazi Germany; Red Background: Time of communist East Germany)

Recent Population Development and Projections (Population Development before Census 2011 (blue line); Recent Population Development according to the Census in Germany in 2011 (blue bordered line); Official projections for 2005-2030 (yellow line); for 2017-2030 (scarlet line); for 2020-2030 (green line)

Amt Beetzsee: Population development
within the current boundaries (2020)

Year	Pop.	±% p.a.
1875	8,712	—
1890	9,402	+0.51%
1910	8,990	−0.22%
1925	8,871	−0.09%
1939	9,351	+0.38%
1950	11,689	+2.05%
1964	8,836	−1.98%
1971	8,657	−0.29%
1981	7,443	−1.50%

Year	Pop.	±% p.a.
1985	7,183	−0.88%
1990	6,846	−0.96%
1995	7,296	+1.28%
2000	8,892	+4.04%
2005	8,666	−0.51%
2010	8,473	−0.45%
2015	8,141	−0.80%
2020	8,295	+0.38%
2025	8,322	+0.07%
