= Beetzsee (municipality) =

- Municipality
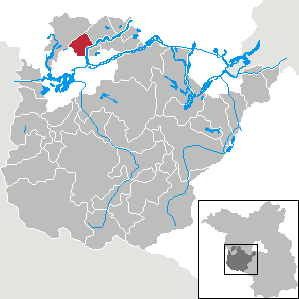
- Location of Beetzsee within Potsdam-Mittelmark district
- Interactive map of Beetzsee
- Location within Germany Location within Brandenburg
- Coordinates: 52°28′00″N 12°33′00″E
- Country: Germany
- State: Brandenburg
- District: Potsdam-Mittelmark
- Municipal assoc.: Beetzsee
- Subdivisions: 3 Ortsteile

Government
  - Mayor (2024–29): Torsten Richter

Area
  - Total: 35.77 km^{2} (13.81 sq mi)
- Elevation: 35 m (115 ft)

Population (2025-12-31)
  - Total: 2,724
  - Density: 76.15/km^{2} (197.2/sq mi)
- Time zone: UTC+01:00 (CET)
  - Summer (DST): UTC+02:00 (CEST)
- Postal codes: 14778
- Dialling codes: 03381
- Vehicle registration: PM
- Website: www.amt-beetzsee.de

Beetzsee is a municipality in the Potsdam-Mittelmark district, in Brandenburg, Germany. It takes its name from the Beetzsee, a large lake.

== Demography ==
Development of Population since 1875 within the Current Boundaries (Blue Line: Population; Dotted Line: Comparison to Population Development of Brandenburg state; Grey Background: Time of Nazi rule; Red Background: Time of Communist rule)

Beetzsee: Population development
within the current boundaries (2013)

Year	Pop.	±% p.a.
1875	1,149	—
1890	1,277	+0.71%
1910	1,242	−0.14%
1925	1,395	+0.78%
1933	1,286	−1.01%
1939	1,500	+2.60%
1946	1,702	+1.82%
1950	1,709	+0.10%
1964	1,413	−1.35%
1971	1,419	+0.06%
1981	1,394	−0.18%
1985	1,325	−1.26%
1989	1,314	−0.21%
1990	1,321	+0.53%
1991	1,356	+2.65%
1992	1,373	+1.25%
1993	1,396	+1.68%
1994	1,524	+9.17%
1995	1,643	+7.81%
1996	1,744	+6.15%

Year	Pop.	±% p.a.
1997	2,064	+18.35%
1998	2,281	+10.51%
1999	2,457	+7.72%
2000	2,536	+3.22%
2001	2,579	+1.70%
2002	2,606	+1.05%
2003	2,644	+1.46%
2004	2,600	−1.66%
2005	2,546	−2.08%
2006	2,526	−0.79%
2007	2,548	+0.87%
2008	2,534	−0.55%
2009	2,519	−0.59%
2010	2,510	−0.36%
2011	2,427	−3.31%
2012	2,421	−0.25%
2013	2,469	+1.98%
2014	2,501	+1.30%
2015	2,512	+0.44%
2016	2,553	+1.63%
