= Päwesin =

- Municipality
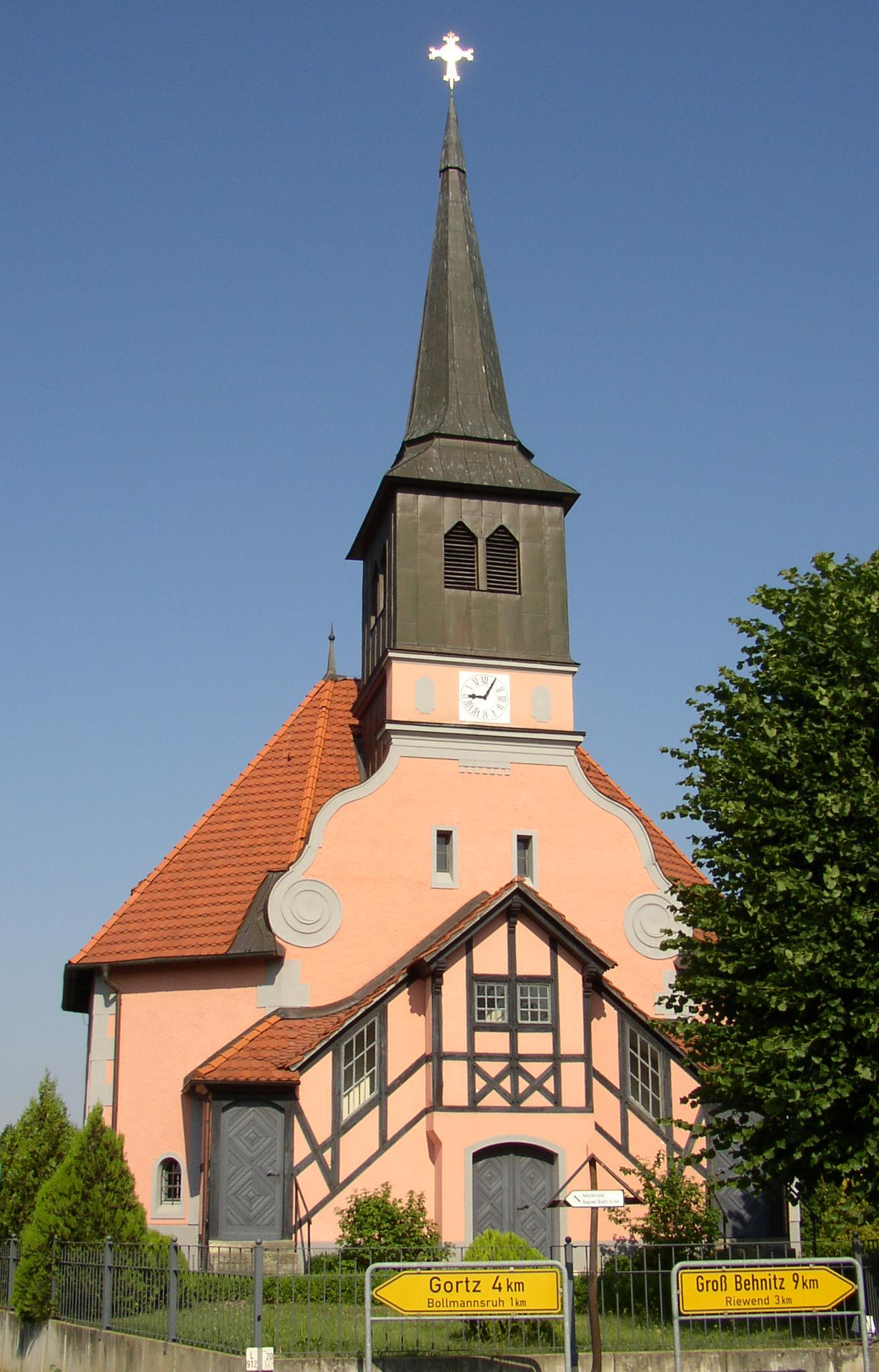
- Church in Bagow

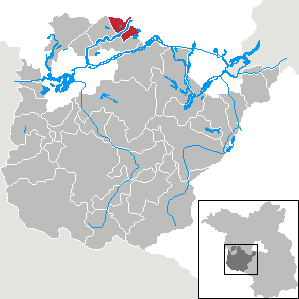
- Location of Päwesin within Potsdam-Mittelmark district
- Interactive map of Päwesin
- Location within Germany Location within Brandenburg
- Coordinates: 52°31′00″N 12°43′00″E
- Country: Germany
- State: Brandenburg
- District: Potsdam-Mittelmark
- Municipal assoc.: Beetzsee
- Subdivisions: 3 Ortsteile

Government
  - Mayor (2024–29): Ingo Ahrens

Area
  - Total: 23.56 km^{2} (9.10 sq mi)
- Elevation: 33 m (108 ft)

Population (2025-12-31)
  - Total: 506
  - Density: 21.5/km^{2} (55.6/sq mi)
- Time zone: UTC+01:00 (CET)
  - Summer (DST): UTC+02:00 (CEST)
- Postal codes: 14778
- Dialling codes: 033838
- Vehicle registration: PM
- Website: www.paewesin.de

Päwesin is a municipality in the Potsdam-Mittelmark district, in Brandenburg, Germany.

== Overview ==
It is located between the Beetzsee and Riewendsee lakes, 14 kilometres (8.7 mi) north east from Brandenburg. There are about 600 residents and the town is 800 years old.

The landscape and nature have made this a popular destination for hikers and bicyclists. The area is popular for fishing, sailing, surfing and rowing.

Advena Hotels Bollmannsruh is the only hotel in the town.

== Demography ==
Development of population since 1875 within the current Boundaries (Blue Line: Population; Dotted Line: Comparison to Population development in Brandenburg state; Grey Background: Time of Nazi Germany; Red Background: Time of communist East Germany)

Päwesin: Population development
within the current boundaries (2013)

Year	Pop.	±% p.a.
1875	715	—
1890	1,074	+2.75%
1910	1,070	−0.02%
1925	998	−0.46%
1933	950	−0.61%
1939	988	+0.66%
1946	1,275	+3.71%
1950	1,313	+0.74%
1964	839	−3.15%
1971	809	−0.52%
1981	696	−1.49%
1985	688	−0.29%
1989	684	−0.15%
1990	667	−2.49%
1991	662	−0.75%
1992	645	−2.57%
1993	643	−0.31%
1994	620	−3.58%
1995	620	+0.00%
1996	593	−4.35%

Year	Pop.	±% p.a.
1997	598	+0.84%
1998	589	−1.51%
1999	587	−0.34%
2000	585	−0.34%
2001	579	−1.03%
2002	565	−2.42%
2003	584	+3.36%
2004	579	−0.86%
2005	570	−1.55%
2006	569	−0.18%
2007	575	+1.05%
2008	575	+0.00%
2009	581	+1.04%
2010	562	−3.27%
2011	537	−4.45%
2012	546	+1.68%
2013	539	−1.28%
2014	537	−0.37%
2015	531	−1.12%
2016	521	−1.88%
