= Wusterwitz =

- Municipality
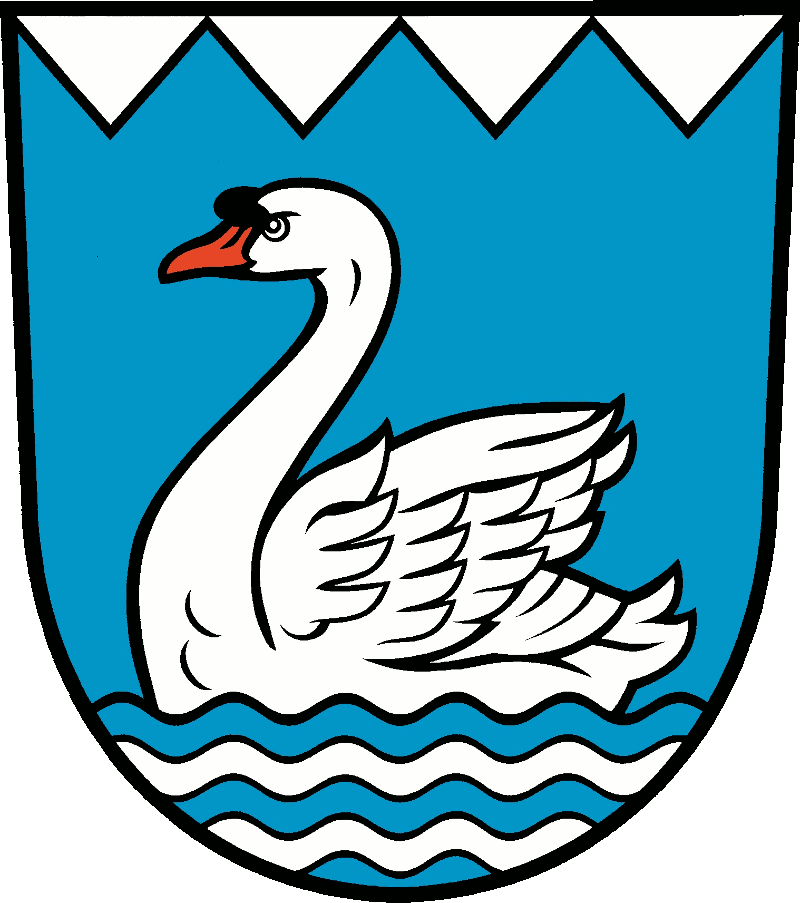
- Coat of arms

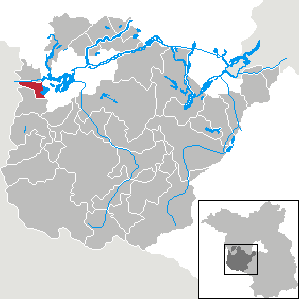
- Location of Wusterwitz within Potsdam-Mittelmark district
- Interactive map of Wusterwitz
- Location within Germany Location within Brandenburg
- Coordinates: 52°22′59″N 12°24′00″E
- Country: Germany
- State: Brandenburg
- District: Potsdam-Mittelmark
- Municipal assoc.: Wusterwitz

Government
  - Mayor (2024–29): Ramona Mayer

Area
  - Total: 23.43 km^{2} (9.05 sq mi)
- Elevation: 29 m (95 ft)

Population (2025-12-31)
  - Total: 2,850
  - Density: 122/km^{2} (315/sq mi)
- Time zone: UTC+01:00 (CET)
  - Summer (DST): UTC+02:00 (CEST)
- Postal codes: 14789
- Dialling codes: 033839
- Vehicle registration: PM

Wusterwitz is a municipality in the Potsdam-Mittelmark district, in Brandenburg, Germany. Wusterwitz has a population of approximately 3,000 inhabitants.

== Demography ==
Development of population since 1875 within the current Boundaries (Blue Line: Population; Dotted Line: Comparison to Population development in Brandenburg state; Grey Background: Time of Nazi Germany; Red Background: Time of communist East Germany)

Wusterwitz: Population development
within the current boundaries (2013)

Year	Pop.	±% p.a.
1875	1,000	—
1890	1,300	+1.76%
1910	1,800	+1.64%
1925	2,674	+2.67%
1933	3,101	+1.87%
1939	3,725	+3.10%
1946	4,706	+3.40%
1950	4,613	−0.50%
1964	3,694	−1.57%
1971	3,435	−1.03%
1981	3,123	−0.95%
1985	2,991	−1.07%
1989	2,853	−1.17%
1990	2,790	−2.21%
1991	2,749	−1.47%
1992	2,741	−0.29%
1993	2,789	+1.75%
1994	2,774	−0.54%
1995	2,809	+1.26%
1996	2,836	+0.96%

Year	Pop.	±% p.a.
1997	2,847	+0.39%
1998	2,936	+3.13%
1999	2,992	+1.91%
2000	3,095	+3.44%
2001	3,083	−0.39%
2002	3,133	+1.62%
2003	3,159	+0.83%
2004	3,162	+0.09%
2005	3,155	−0.22%
2006	3,172	+0.54%
2007	3,140	−1.01%
2008	3,117	−0.73%
2009	3,130	+0.42%
2010	3,151	+0.67%
2011	3,082	−2.19%
2012	3,070	−0.39%
2013	3,063	−0.23%
2014	3,066	+0.10%
2015	3,029	−1.21%
2016	3,042	+0.43%

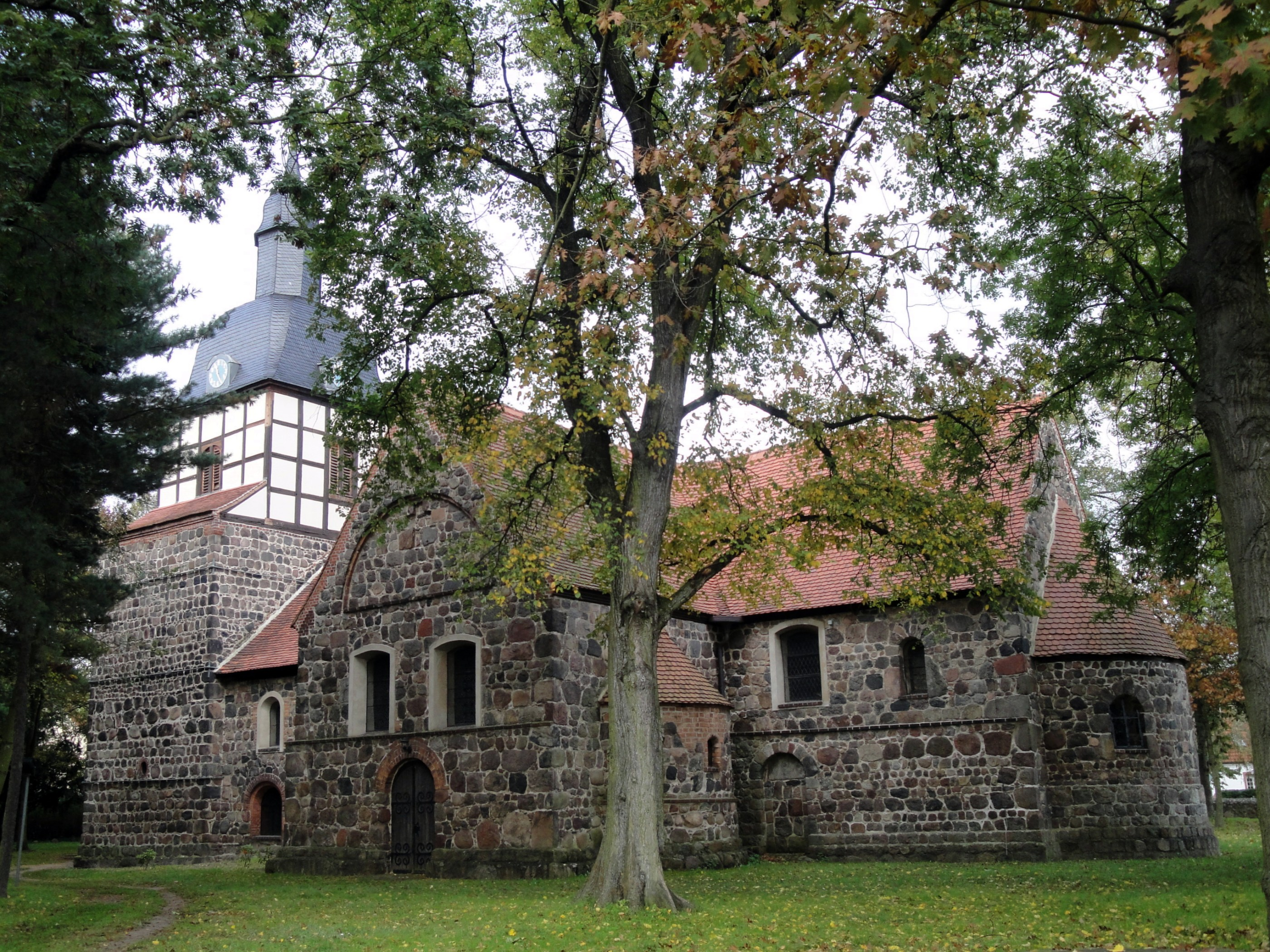
Church

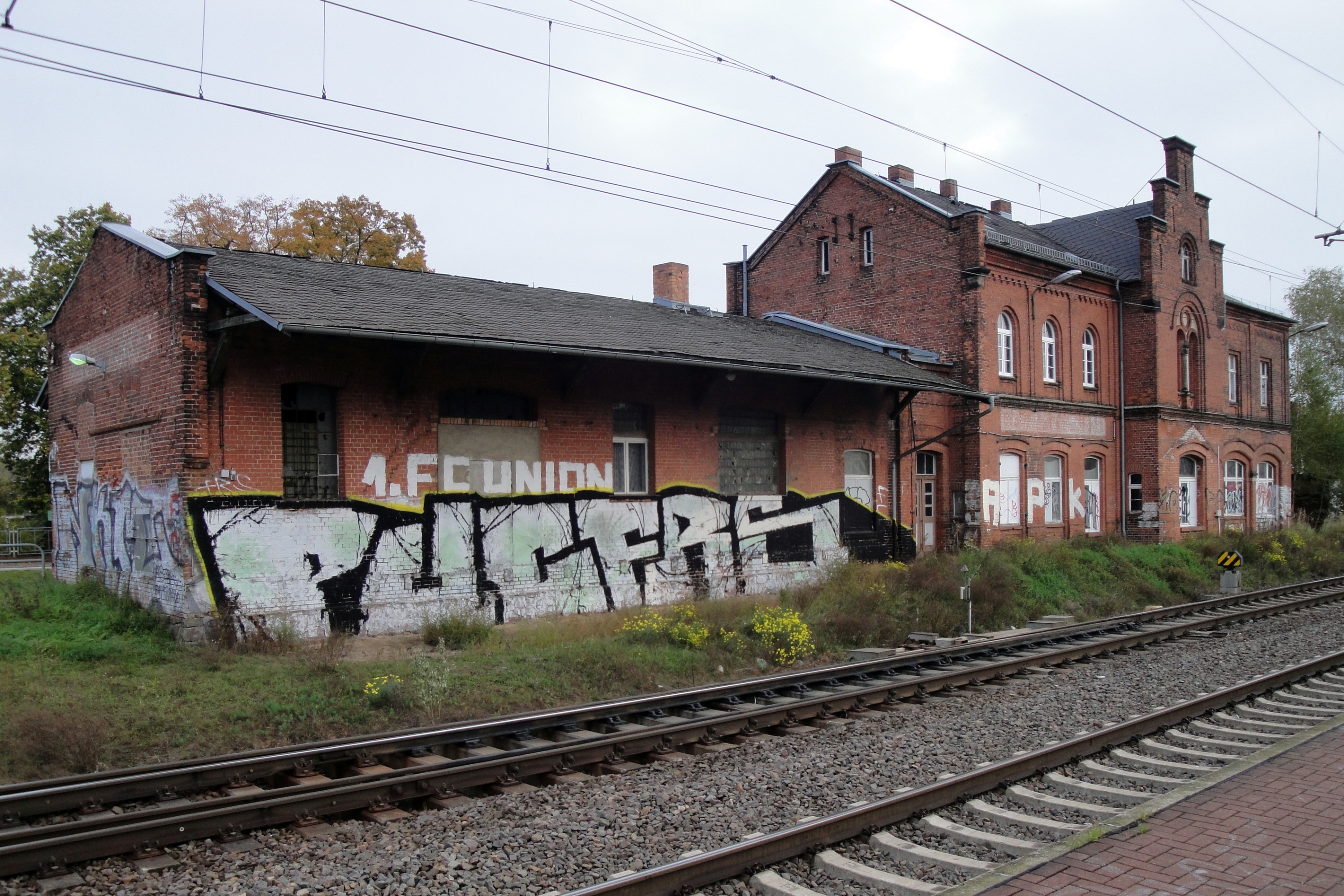
Wusterwitz station

== Personalities ==
- Engelbert Wusterwitz (1385-1433), chronicler of the Brandenburg story, his family came from Großwusterwitz
- Werner Nothe (born 1938), politician (SED), 1989 to 1990 Lord Mayor of Magdeburg, born in Großwusterwitz
