= Wollin, Brandenburg =

Wollin
- Municipality
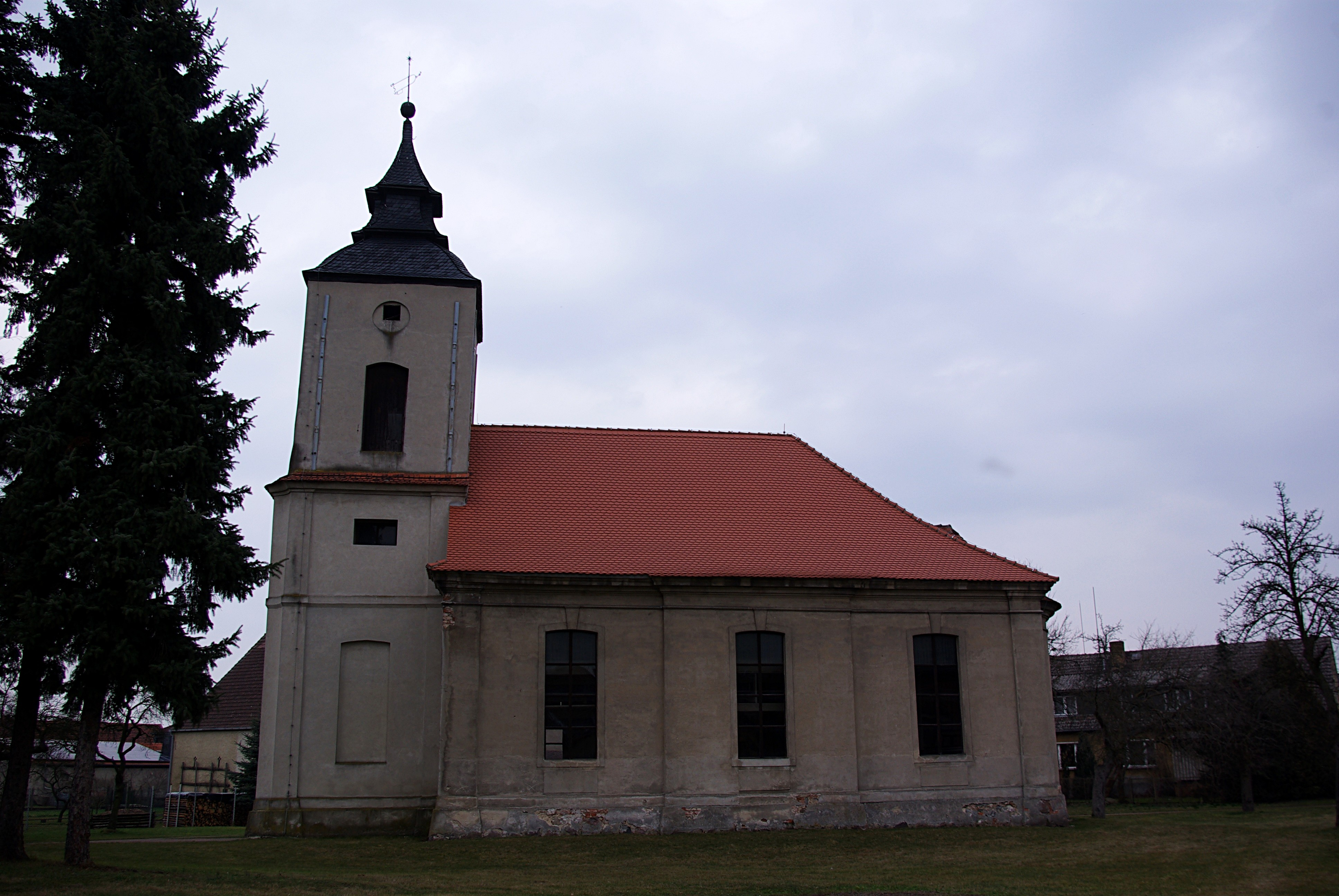
- The church of Wollin

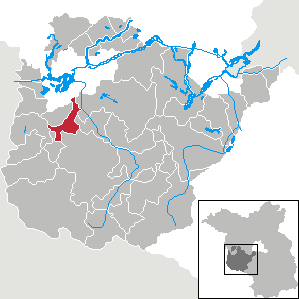
- Location of Wollin within Potsdam-Mittelmark district
- Interactive map of Wollin
- Location within Germany Location within Brandenburg
- Coordinates: 52°16′59″N 12°28′00″E
- Country: Germany
- State: Brandenburg
- District: Potsdam-Mittelmark
- Municipal assoc.: Ziesar

Government
  - Mayor (2024–29): Jens Haase

Area
  - Total: 27.71 km^{2} (10.70 sq mi)
- Elevation: 37 m (121 ft)

Population (2025-12-31)
  - Total: 803
  - Density: 29.0/km^{2} (75.1/sq mi)
- Time zone: UTC+01:00 (CET)
  - Summer (DST): UTC+02:00 (CEST)
- Postal codes: 14778
- Dialling codes: 03383
- Vehicle registration: PM

Wollin (German pronunciation: [vɔˈliːn]) is a municipality in the Potsdam-Mittelmark district, in Brandenburg, Germany.

== Demography ==
Development of population since 1875 within the current Boundaries (Blue Line: Population; Dotted Line: Comparison to Population development in Brandenburg state; Grey Background: Time of Nazi Germany; Red Background: Time of communist East Germany)

Wollin [Fläming]: Population development
within the current boundaries (2013)

Year	Pop.	±% p.a.
1875	857	—
1890	857	+0.00%
1910	857	+0.00%
1925	857	+0.00%
1933	829	−0.41%
1939	842	+0.26%
1946	1,008	+2.60%
1950	1,003	−0.12%
1964	892	−0.83%
1971	838	−0.89%
1981	930	+1.05%
1985	906	−0.65%
1989	877	−0.81%
1990	886	+1.03%
1991	852	−3.84%
1992	861	+1.06%
1993	866	+0.58%
1994	865	−0.12%
1995	873	+0.92%
1996	878	+0.57%

Year	Pop.	±% p.a.
1997	906	+3.19%
1998	908	+0.22%
1999	940	+3.52%
2000	956	+1.70%
2001	951	−0.52%
2002	958	+0.74%
2003	965	+0.73%
2004	974	+0.93%
2005	950	−2.46%
2006	934	−1.68%
2007	922	−1.28%
2008	920	−0.22%
2009	911	−0.98%
2010	909	−0.22%
2011	910	+0.11%
2012	890	−2.20%
2013	880	−1.12%
2014	861	−2.16%
2015	860	−0.12%
2016	844	−1.86%
