= Ziesar =

- Town
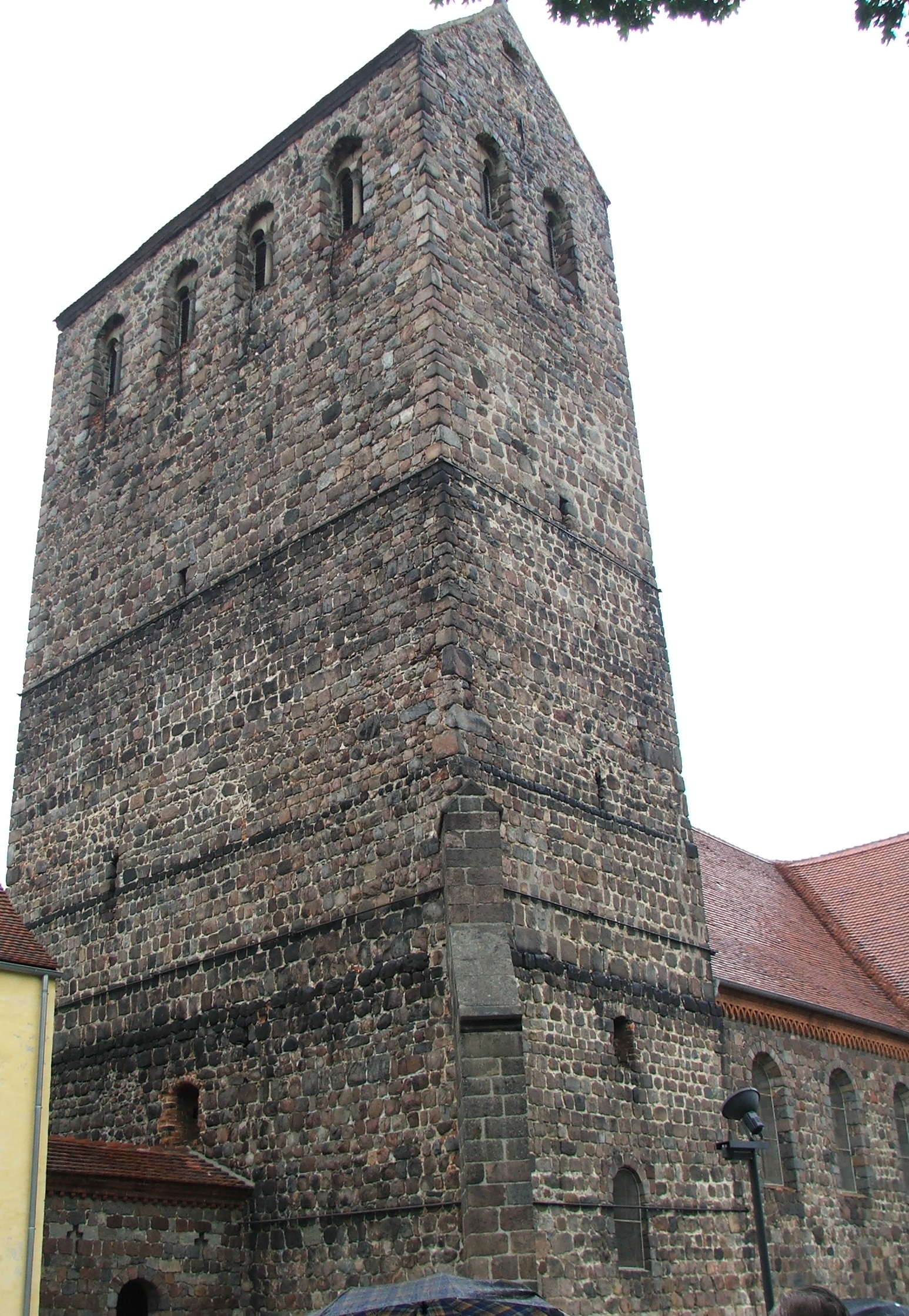
- Town church

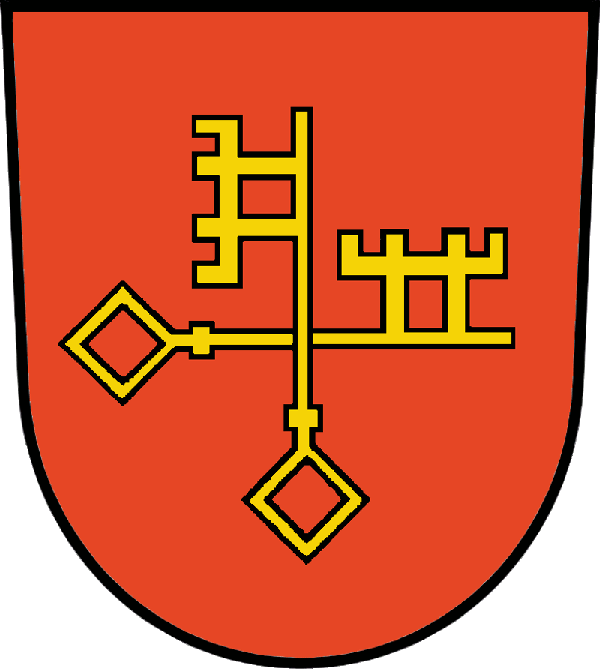
- Coat of arms

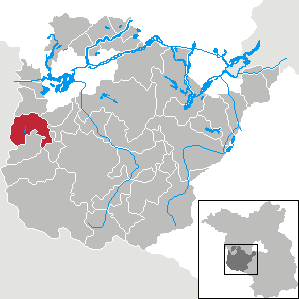
- Location of Ziesar within Potsdam-Mittelmark district
- Interactive map of Ziesar
- Location within Germany Location within Brandenburg
- Coordinates: 52°16′00″N 12°16′59″E
- Country: Germany
- State: Brandenburg
- District: Potsdam-Mittelmark
- Municipal assoc.: Ziesar
- Subdivisions: 3 Ortsteile

Government
  - Mayor (2024–29): René Mertens (CDU)

Area
  - Total: 67.95 km^{2} (26.24 sq mi)
- Elevation: 55 m (180 ft)

Population (2025-12-31)
  - Total: 2,388
  - Density: 35.14/km^{2} (91.02/sq mi)
- Time zone: UTC+01:00 (CET)
  - Summer (DST): UTC+02:00 (CEST)
- Postal codes: 14793
- Dialling codes: 033830
- Vehicle registration: PM
- Website: www.ziesar.de

Ziesar (German pronunciation: [tsiˈeːzaʁ]) is a town in the Potsdam-Mittelmark district, in Brandenburg, Germany. It is situated 24 km (15 mi) south-west of the city of Brandenburg.

== Demography ==
Development of population since 1875 within the current boundaries (Blue line: Population; Dotted line: Comparison to population development of Brandenburg state; Grey background: Time of Nazi rule; Red background: Time of communist rule)

Ziesar: Population development
within the current boundaries (2013)

| Year | Pop. | ±% p.a. |
|---|---|---|
| 1875 | 3,590 | — |
| 1890 | 3,619 | +0.05% |
| 1910 | 3,708 | +0.12% |
| 1925 | 3,757 | +0.09% |
| 1933 | 3,670 | −0.29% |
| 1939 | 3,879 | +0.93% |
| 1946 | 4,964 | +3.59% |
| 1950 | 5,057 | +0.47% |
| 1964 | 4,096 | −1.49% |
| 1971 | 3,677 | −1.53% |
| 1981 | 3,390 | −0.81% |
| 1985 | 3,345 | −0.33% |
| 1989 | 3,266 | −0.60% |
| 1990 | 3,219 | −1.44% |
| 1991 | 3,149 | −2.17% |
| 1992 | 3,110 | −1.24% |
| 1993 | 3,090 | −0.64% |
| 1994 | 3,064 | −0.84% |
| 1995 | 3,028 | −1.17% |
| 1996 | 3,012 | −0.53% |

| Year | Pop. | ±% p.a. |
|---|---|---|
| 1997 | 3,010 | −0.07% |
| 1998 | 3,031 | +0.70% |
| 1999 | 3,006 | −0.82% |
| 2000 | 2,984 | −0.73% |
| 2001 | 2,930 | −1.81% |
| 2002 | 2,910 | −0.68% |
| 2003 | 2,893 | −0.58% |
| 2004 | 2,860 | −1.14% |
| 2005 | 2,806 | −1.89% |
| 2006 | 2,763 | −1.53% |
| 2007 | 2,716 | −1.70% |
| 2008 | 2,657 | −2.17% |
| 2009 | 2,605 | −1.96% |
| 2010 | 2,553 | −2.00% |
| 2011 | 2,485 | −2.66% |
| 2012 | 2,482 | −0.12% |
| 2013 | 2,453 | −1.17% |
| 2014 | 2,441 | −0.49% |
| 2015 | 2,451 | +0.41% |
| 2016 | 2,444 | −0.29% |

== Local council ==
Following local elections held on 26 May 2019:

- SPD 5 seats
- CDU 4 seats
- Freie Bürger und Bauern (FBB) (Free citizens and farmers) 3 seats

== Pictures ==
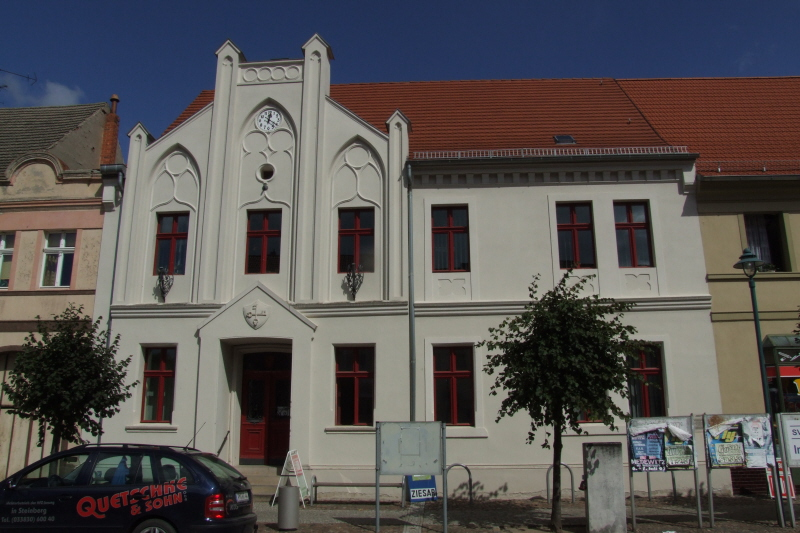
Ziesar Town hall

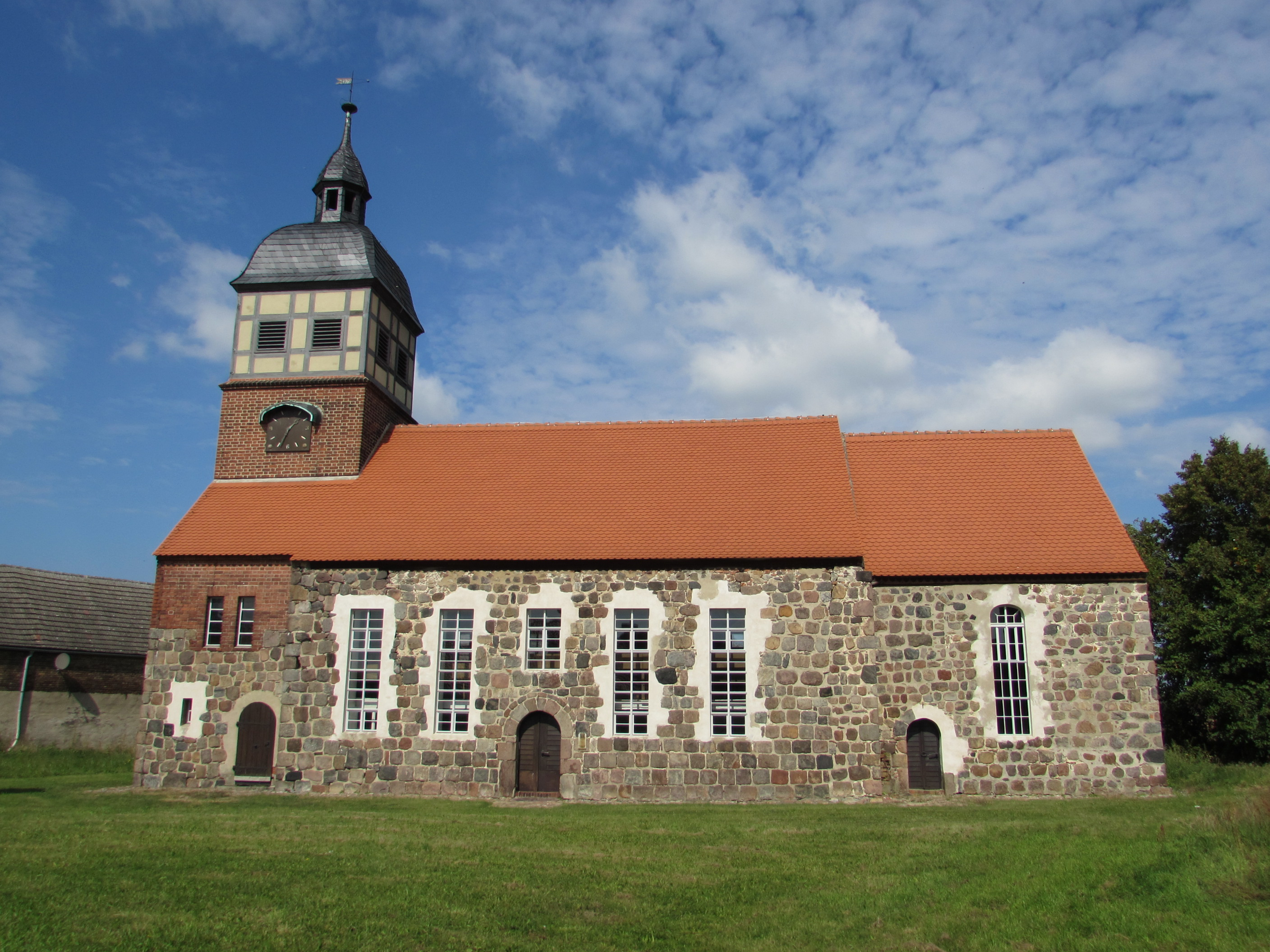
Church in Glienecke (Ziesar)

== History ==
During the Cold War the Western Allies considered Ziesar, specifically Exit 76 from Autobahn 2, the halfway point of the transit route between West Berlin and "mainland" West Germany. Road patrols offering breakdown services and assistance with DDR and Soviet authorities to Allied travelers were provided by Americans based in Berlin east of Ziesar and by the British detachment at Helmstedt west of it. The Helmstedt checkpoint is called Checkpoint Alpha and is used to cross the inner German border , the Berlin checkpoint is called Checkpoint Bravo and is used to cross from East Germany to West Berlin, Checkpoint Charlie is the most famous one and that is used to cross from West Berlin to East Berlin and later East Germany.

== Sons and daughters of Ziesar ==
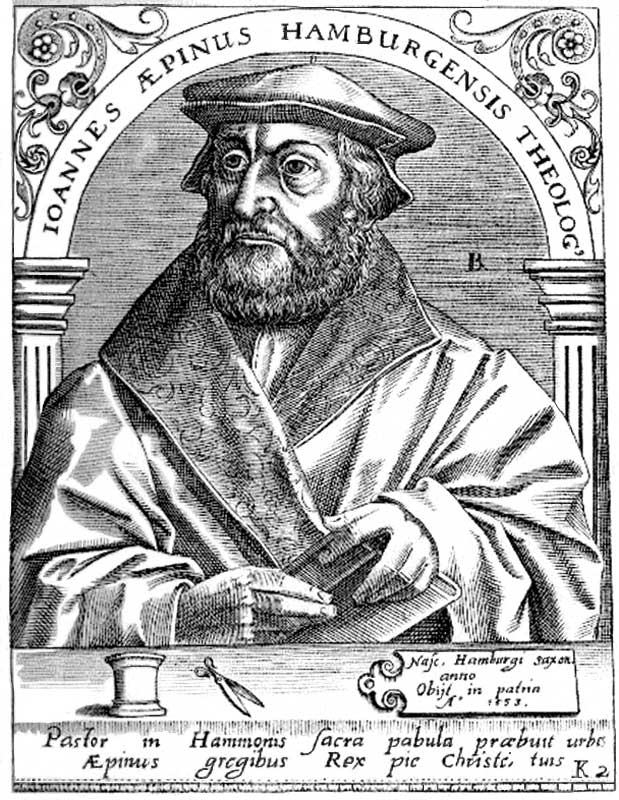
Johannes Aepinus

- Johannes Aepinus (1499-1553), theologian and church reformer
- Paul Schneider (1863-1946), the secret war councilor, farmer and the last private owner of Castle Ziesar from 1917 to 1945

== Other personalities associated with Ziesar ==
- Wilhelm Kuhnert (1865-1926), painter
