= Wusterwitz (Amt) =

- Amt
- Map of Potsdam-Mittelmark highlighting Wusterwitz
- Interactive map of Wusterwitz
- Location within Germany Location within Brandenburg
- Coordinates: 52°23′N 12°22′E
- Country: Germany
- State: Brandenburg
- District: Potsdam-Mittelmark
- Seat: Wusterwitz
- Subdivisions: 3 municipalities

Area
  - Total: 107.86 km^{2} (41.64 sq mi)

Population (2025-12-31)
  - Total: 4,937
  - Density: 45.77/km^{2} (118.5/sq mi)
- Time zone: UTC+01:00 (CET)
  - Summer (DST): UTC+02:00 (CEST)
- Website: www.amt-wusterwitz.de

Amt Wusterwitz is an Amt ("collective municipality") in the district of Potsdam-Mittelmark, in Brandenburg, Germany. Its seat is in Wusterwitz.

The Amt Wusterwitz consists of the following municipalities:

1. Bensdorf
2. Rosenau
3. Wusterwitz

== Demography ==
Development of population since 1875 within the current Boundaries (Blue Line: Population; Dotted Line: Comparison to Population development in Brandenburg state; Grey Background: Time of Nazi Germany; Red Background: Time of communist East Germany)

Recent Population Development and Projections (Population Development before Census 2011 (blue line); Recent Population Development according to the Census in Germany in 2011 (blue bordered line); Official projections for 2005-2030 (yellow line); for 2017-2030 (scarlet line); for 2020-2030 (green line)

Amt Wusterwitz: Population development
within the current boundaries (2025)

Year	Pop.	±% p.a.
1875	3,662	—
1890	4,153	+0.84%
1910	4,952	+0.88%
1925	6,056	+1.35%
1933	6,320	+0.53%
1939	6,922	+1.53%
1946	8,950	+3.74%
1950	9,271	+0.88%
1964	7,224	−1.77%
1971	6,635	−1.21%

Year	Pop.	±% p.a.
1981	5,647	−1.60%
1985	5,436	−0.95%
1990	5,184	−0.94%
1995	5,024	−0.63%
2000	5,543	+1.99%
2005	5,527	−0.06%
2010	5,341	−0.68%
2015	5,197	−0.55%
2020	5,133	−0.25%
2025	4,937	−0.78%
