= Linthe =

- Municipality
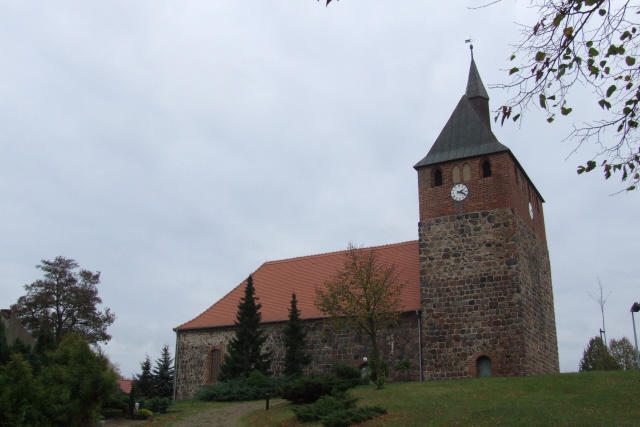
- Village church

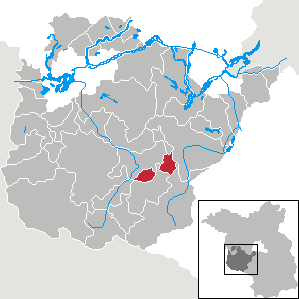
- Location of Linthe within Potsdam-Mittelmark district
- Interactive map of Linthe
- Location within Germany Location within Brandenburg
- Coordinates: 52°09′N 12°47′E
- Country: Germany
- State: Brandenburg
- District: Potsdam-Mittelmark
- Municipal assoc.: Brück
- Subdivisions: 3 Ortsteile

Government
  - Mayor (2024–29): Sigrid Klink (CDU)

Area
  - Total: 29.55 km^{2} (11.41 sq mi)
- Elevation: 55 m (180 ft)

Population (2025-12-31)
  - Total: 893
  - Density: 30.2/km^{2} (78.3/sq mi)
- Time zone: UTC+01:00 (CET)
  - Summer (DST): UTC+02:00 (CEST)
- Postal codes: 14822
- Dialling codes: 033844
- Vehicle registration: PM

Linthe is a municipality in the Potsdam-Mittelmark district, in Brandenburg, Germany.

== Demography ==
Development of population since 1875 within the current boundaries (Blue line: Population; Dotted line: Comparison to population development of Brandenburg state; Grey background: Time of Nazi rule; Red background: Time of communist rule)

Linthe: Population development
within the current boundaries (2013)

Year	Pop.	±% p.a.
1875	631	—
1890	670	+0.40%
1910	706	+0.26%
1925	826	+1.05%
1933	800	−0.40%
1939	806	+0.12%
1946	1,145	+5.14%
1950	1,049	−2.17%
1964	714	−2.71%
1971	716	+0.04%
1981	669	−0.68%
1985	726	+2.07%
1989	694	−1.12%
1990	686	−1.15%
1991	687	+0.15%
1992	708	+3.06%
1993	699	−1.27%
1994	717	+2.58%
1995	766	+6.83%
1996	810	+5.74%

Year	Pop.	±% p.a.
1997	892	+10.12%
1998	969	+8.63%
1999	1,019	+5.16%
2000	954	−6.38%
2001	988	+3.56%
2002	1,008	+2.02%
2003	975	−3.27%
2004	969	−0.62%
2005	957	−1.24%
2006	960	+0.31%
2007	961	+0.10%
2008	933	−2.91%
2009	912	−2.25%
2010	903	−0.99%
2011	896	−0.78%
2012	889	−0.78%
2013	887	−0.22%
2014	902	+1.69%
2015	928	+2.88%
2016	896	−3.45%

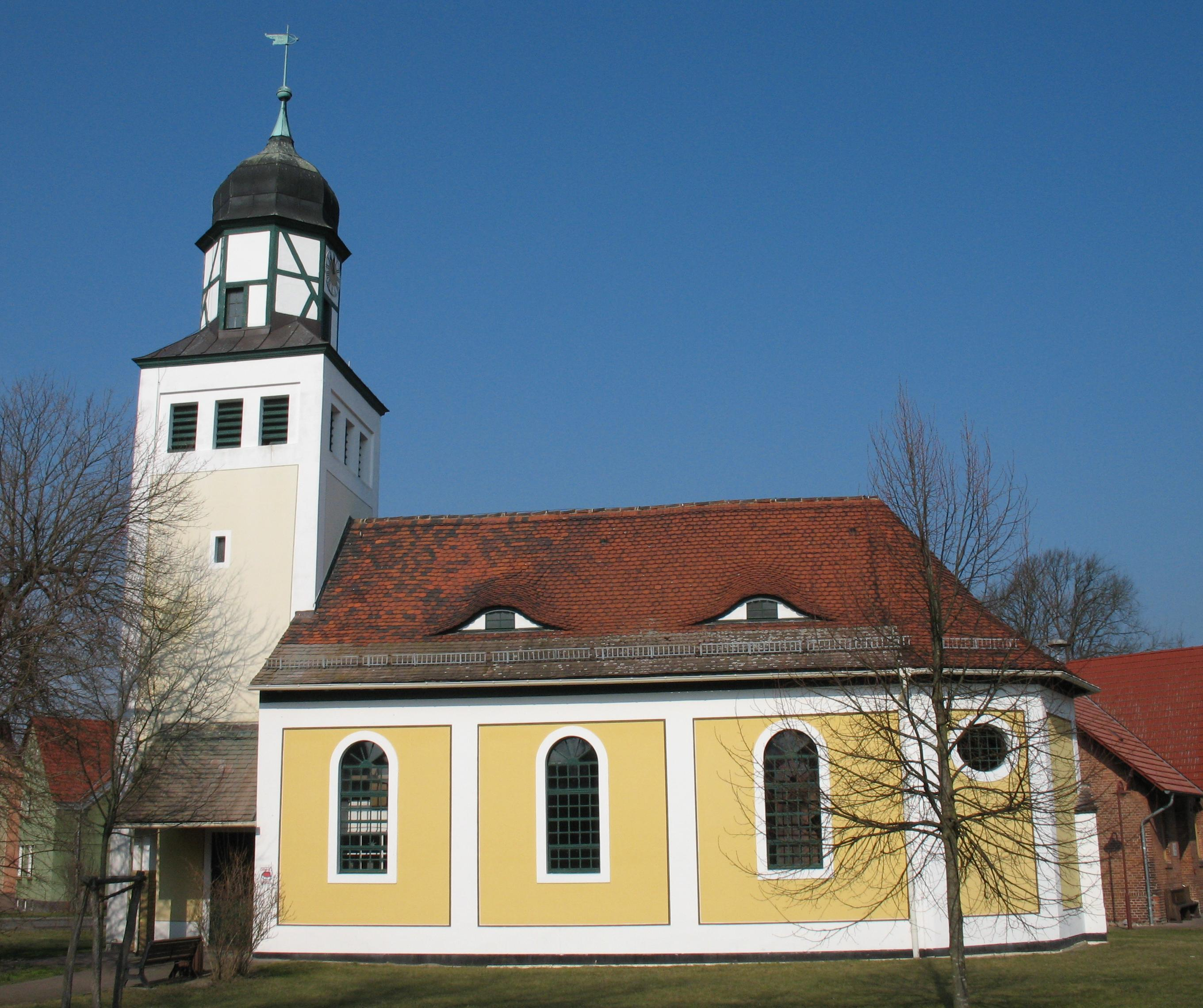
Church in Alt Bork

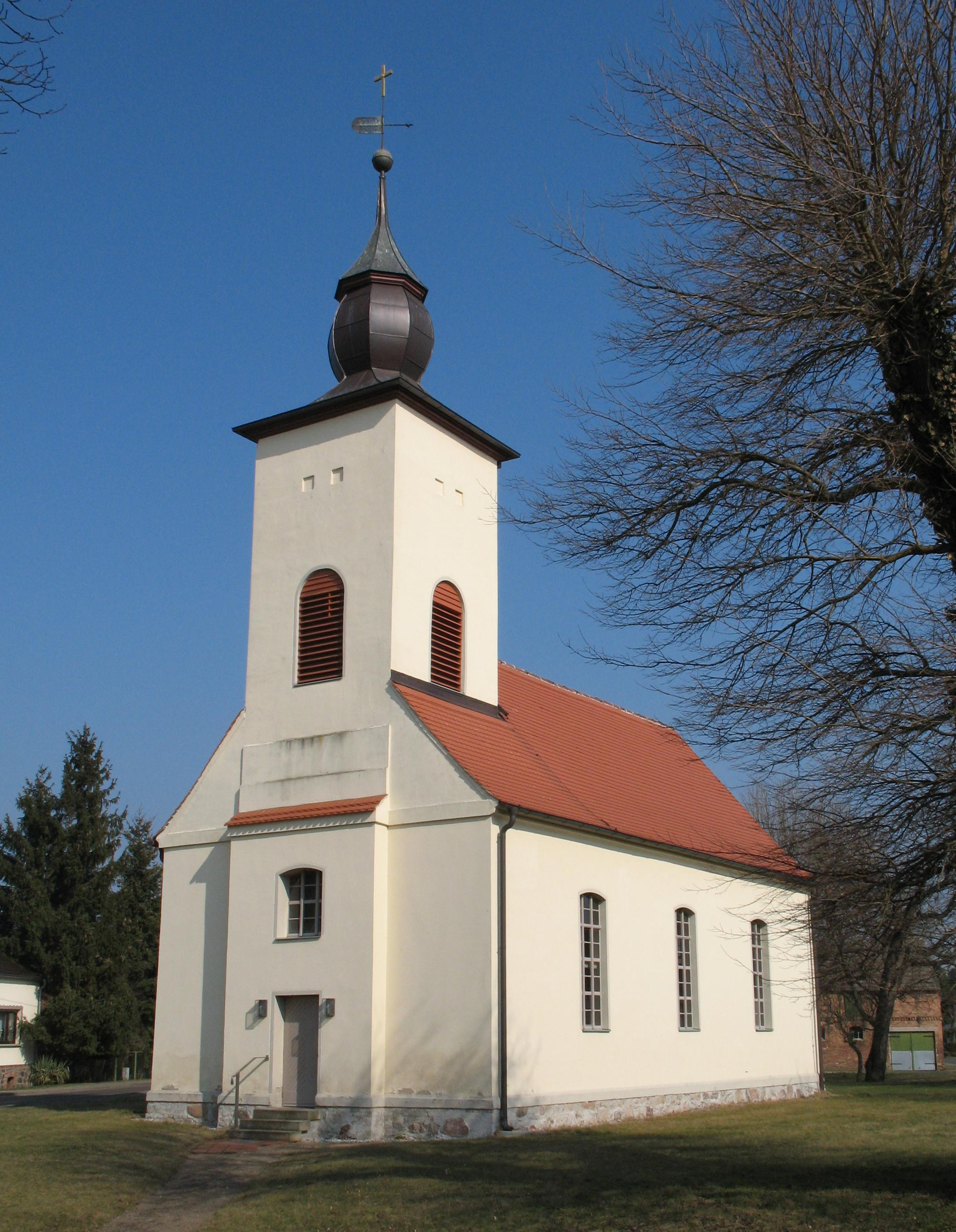
Church in Deutsch Bork
