= Brück (Amt) =

- Amt
- Map of Potsdam-Mittelmark highlighting Brück
- Interactive map of Brück
- Location within Germany Location within Brandenburg
- Coordinates: 52°12′N 12°46′E
- Country: Germany
- State: Brandenburg
- District: Potsdam-Mittelmark
- Seat: Brück
- Subdivisions: 6 municipalities

Area
  - Total: 233.26 km^{2} (90.06 sq mi)

Population (2025-12-31)
  - Total: 11,948
  - Density: 51.222/km^{2} (132.66/sq mi)
- Time zone: UTC+01:00 (CET)
  - Summer (DST): UTC+02:00 (CEST)
- Website: www.amt-brueck.de

Amt Brück is an Amt ("collective municipality") in the district of Potsdam-Mittelmark, in Brandenburg, Germany. Its seat is in Brück.

The Amt Brück consists of the following municipalities:

1. Borkheide
2. Borkwalde
3. Brück
4. Golzow
5. Linthe
6. Planebruch

== Demography ==
Development of population since 1875 within the current Boundaries (Blue Line: Population; Dotted Line: Comparison to Population development in Brandenburg state; Grey Background: Time of Nazi Germany; Red Background: Time of communist East Germany)

Recent Population Development and Projections (Population Development before Census 2011 (blue line); Recent Population Development according to the Census in Germany in 2011 (blue bordered line); Official projections for 2005-2030 (yellow line); for 2017-2030 (scarlet line); for 2020-2030 (green line)

Amt Brück: Population development
within the current boundaries (2020)

Year	Pop.	±% p.a.
1875	6,521	—
1890	6,918	+0.39%
1910	7,239	+0.23%
1925	7,640	+0.36%
1939	8,677	+0.91%
1950	12,326	+3.24%
1964	10,255	−1.31%
1971	10,022	−0.33%
1981	9,288	−0.76%

Year	Pop.	±% p.a.
1985	9,452	+0.44%
1990	9,098	−0.76%
1995	10,234	+2.38%
2000	10,795	+1.07%
2005	10,770	−0.05%
2010	10,400	−0.70%
2015	10,792	+0.74%
2020	11,035	+0.45%
2025	11,948	+1.60%
