= Buckautal =

- Municipality
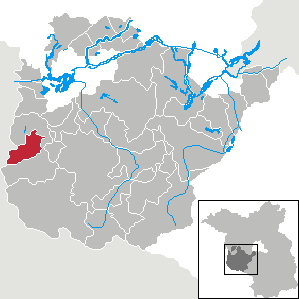
- Location of Buckautal within Potsdam-Mittelmark district
- Interactive map of Buckautal
- Location within Germany Location within Brandenburg
- Coordinates: 52°13′59″N 12°19′19″E
- Country: Germany
- State: Brandenburg
- District: Potsdam-Mittelmark
- Municipal assoc.: Ziesar
- Subdivisions: 4 Ortsteile

Government
  - Mayor (2024–29): Mike Pokorny

Area
  - Total: 39.07 km^{2} (15.09 sq mi)
- Elevation: 70 m (230 ft)

Population (2025-12-31)
  - Total: 460
  - Density: 12/km^{2} (30/sq mi)
- Time zone: UTC+01:00 (CET)
  - Summer (DST): UTC+02:00 (CEST)
- Postal codes: 14793
- Dialling codes: 033830
- Vehicle registration: PM

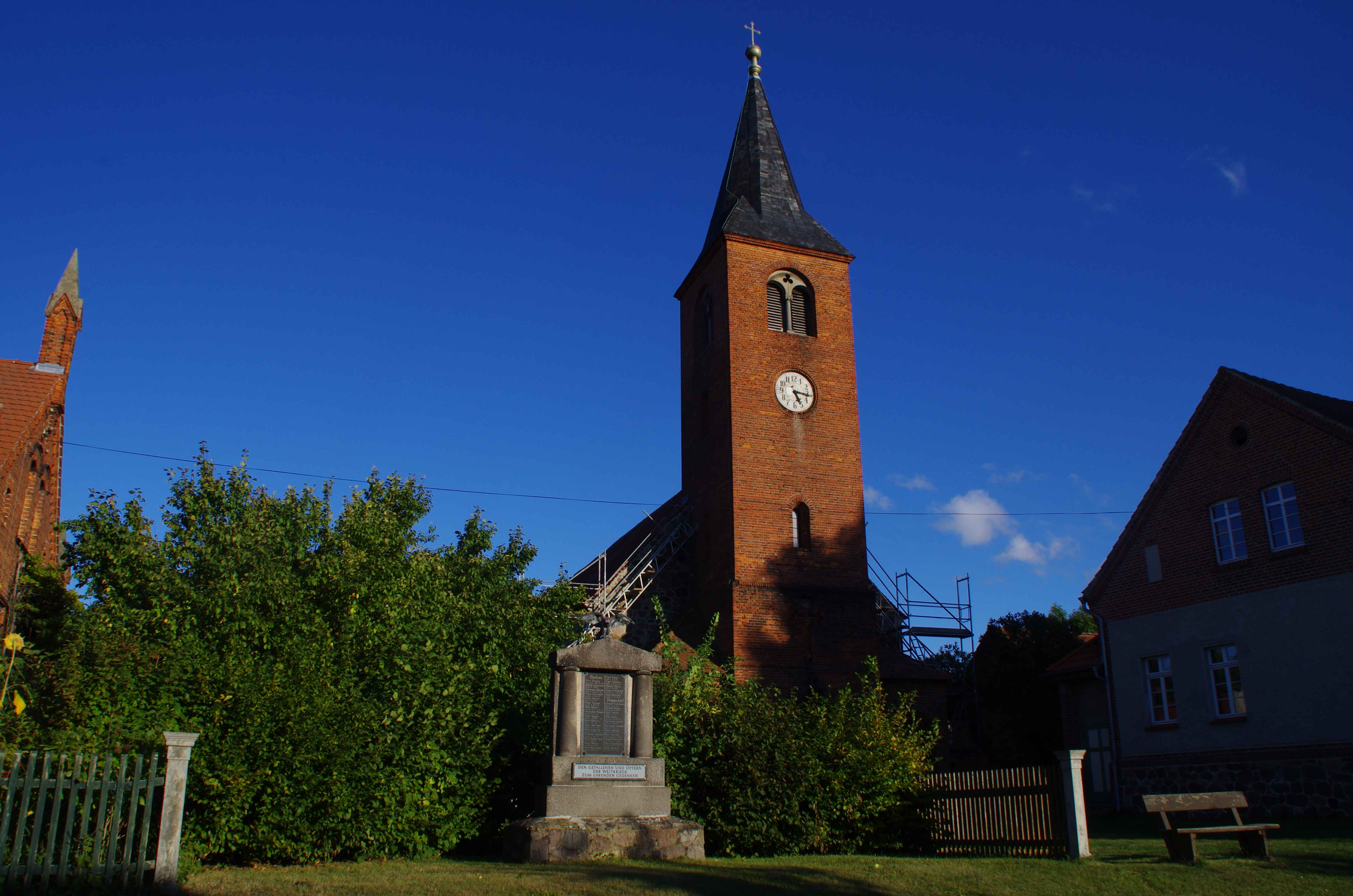
The Church

Buckautal is a municipality in the Potsdam-Mittelmark district, in Brandenburg, Germany.

== Demography ==
Development of Population since 1875 within the Current Boundaries (Blue Line: Population; Dotted Line: Comparison to Population Development of Brandenburg state; Grey Background: Time of Nazi rule; Red Background: Time of Communist rule)

Buckautal: Population development
within the current boundaries (2013)

Year	Pop.	±% p.a.
1875	738	—
1890	748	+0.09%
1910	758	+0.07%
1925	770	+0.10%
1933	730	−0.66%
1939	758	+0.63%
1946	994	+3.95%
1950	1,148	+3.67%
1964	816	−2.41%
1971	714	−1.89%
1981	578	−2.09%
1985	553	−1.10%
1989	556	+0.14%
1990	555	−0.18%
1991	538	−3.06%
1992	540	+0.37%
1993	564	+4.44%
1994	608	+7.80%
1995	607	−0.16%
1996	617	+1.65%

Year	Pop.	±% p.a.
1997	647	+4.86%
1998	634	−2.01%
1999	622	−1.89%
2000	624	+0.32%
2001	608	−2.56%
2002	580	−4.61%
2003	560	−3.45%
2004	546	−2.50%
2005	529	−3.11%
2006	512	−3.21%
2007	516	+0.78%
2008	514	−0.39%
2009	519	+0.97%
2010	515	−0.77%
2011	524	+1.75%
2012	527	+0.57%
2013	518	−1.71%
2014	508	−1.93%
2015	492	−3.15%
2016	496	+0.81%
