= Planebruch =

- Municipality
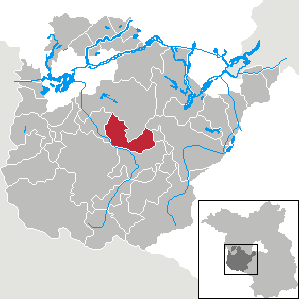
- Location of Planebruch within Potsdam-Mittelmark district
- Interactive map of Planebruch
- Location within Germany Location within Brandenburg
- Coordinates: 52°15′15″N 12°41′15″E
- Country: Germany
- State: Brandenburg
- District: Potsdam-Mittelmark
- Municipal assoc.: Brück
- Subdivisions: 3 Ortsteile

Government
  - Mayor (2024–29): Stephan Burow

Area
  - Total: 65.30 km^{2} (25.21 sq mi)
- Elevation: 43 m (141 ft)

Population (2025-12-31)
  - Total: 989
  - Density: 15.1/km^{2} (39.2/sq mi)
- Time zone: UTC+01:00 (CET)
  - Summer (DST): UTC+02:00 (CEST)
- Postal codes: 14822
- Dialling codes: 033835, 033844
- Vehicle registration: PM
- Website: www.amt-brueck.de

Planebruch is a municipality in the Potsdam-Mittelmark district, in Brandenburg, Germany.

== Demography ==
Development of population since 1875 within the current Boundaries (Blue Line: Population; Dotted Line: Comparison to Population development in Brandenburg state; Grey Background: Time of Nazi Germany; Red Background: Time of communist East Germany)

Planebruch: Population development
within the current boundaries (2013)

Year	Pop.	±% p.a.
1875	1,550	—
1890	1,608	+0.25%
1910	1,558	−0.16%
1925	1,496	−0.27%
1933	1,536	+0.33%
1939	1,502	−0.37%
1946	2,168	+5.38%
1950	1,959	−2.50%
1964	1,524	−1.78%
1971	1,430	−0.91%
1981	1,239	−1.42%
1985	1,228	−0.22%
1989	1,235	+0.14%
1990	1,215	−1.62%
1991	1,195	−1.65%
1992	1,179	−1.34%
1993	1,173	−0.51%
1994	1,168	−0.43%
1995	1,150	−1.54%
1996	1,171	+1.83%

Year	Pop.	±% p.a.
1997	1,171	+0.00%
1998	1,183	+1.02%
1999	1,171	−1.01%
2000	1,180	+0.77%
2001	1,192	+1.02%
2002	1,177	−1.26%
2003	1,177	+0.00%
2004	1,166	−0.93%
2005	1,158	−0.69%
2006	1,146	−1.04%
2007	1,136	−0.87%
2008	1,135	−0.09%
2009	1,119	−1.41%
2010	1,119	+0.00%
2011	1,084	−3.13%
2012	1,076	−0.74%
2013	1,059	−1.58%
2014	1,040	−1.79%
2015	1,042	+0.19%
2016	1,023	−1.82%
