= Roskow =

- Municipality
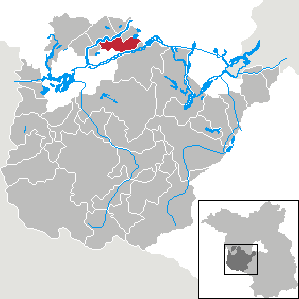
- Location of Roskow within Potsdam-Mittelmark district
- Interactive map of Roskow
- Location within Germany Location within Brandenburg
- Coordinates: 52°28′00″N 12°43′59″E
- Country: Germany
- State: Brandenburg
- District: Potsdam-Mittelmark
- Municipal assoc.: Beetzsee
- Subdivisions: 3 Ortsteile

Government
  - Mayor (2024–29): Daniel Schulz

Area
  - Total: 38.78 km^{2} (14.97 sq mi)
- Elevation: 27 m (89 ft)

Population (2025-12-31)
  - Total: 1,204
  - Density: 31.05/km^{2} (80.41/sq mi)
- Time zone: UTC+01:00 (CET)
  - Summer (DST): UTC+02:00 (CEST)
- Postal codes: 14778
- Dialling codes: 033831
- Vehicle registration: PM

Roskow is a municipality in the Potsdam-Mittelmark district, in Brandenburg, Germany.

== Demography ==
Development of population since 1875 within the current Boundaries (Blue Line: Population; Dotted Line: Comparison to Population development in Brandenburg state; Grey Background: Time of Nazi Germany; Red Background: Time of communist East Germany)

Roskow: Population development
within the current boundaries (2013)

| Year | Pop. | ±% p.a. |
|---|---|---|
| 1875 | 1,341 | — |
| 1890 | 1,354 | +0.06% |
| 1910 | 1,440 | +0.31% |
| 1925 | 1,422 | −0.08% |
| 1933 | 1,256 | −1.54% |
| 1939 | 1,327 | +0.92% |
| 1946 | 2,056 | +6.45% |
| 1950 | 2,150 | +1.12% |
| 1964 | 1,547 | −2.32% |
| 1971 | 1,663 | +1.04% |
| 1981 | 1,385 | −1.81% |
| 1985 | 1,312 | −1.34% |
| 1989 | 1,314 | +0.04% |
| 1990 | 1,282 | −2.44% |
| 1991 | 1,281 | −0.08% |
| 1992 | 1,278 | −0.23% |
| 1993 | 1,250 | −2.19% |
| 1994 | 1,283 | +2.64% |
| 1995 | 1,265 | −1.40% |
| 1996 | 1,293 | +2.21% |

| Year | Pop. | ±% p.a. |
|---|---|---|
| 1997 | 1,286 | −0.54% |
| 1998 | 1,282 | −0.31% |
| 1999 | 1,313 | +2.42% |
| 2000 | 1,325 | +0.91% |
| 2001 | 1,318 | −0.53% |
| 2002 | 1,297 | −1.59% |
| 2003 | 1,289 | −0.62% |
| 2004 | 1,304 | +1.16% |
| 2005 | 1,302 | −0.15% |
| 2006 | 1,298 | −0.31% |
| 2007 | 1,274 | −1.85% |
| 2008 | 1,243 | −2.43% |
| 2009 | 1,253 | +0.80% |
| 2010 | 1,233 | −1.60% |
| 2011 | 1,215 | −1.46% |
| 2012 | 1,217 | +0.16% |
| 2013 | 1,208 | −0.74% |
| 2014 | 1,191 | −1.41% |
| 2015 | 1,189 | −0.17% |
| 2016 | 1,188 | −0.08% |
