= Beetzseeheide =

- Municipality
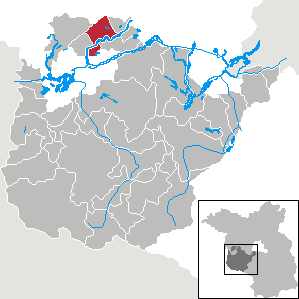
- Location of Beetzseeheide within Potsdam-Mittelmark district
- Interactive map of Beetzseeheide
- Location within Germany Location within Brandenburg
- Coordinates: 52°30′00″N 12°37′59″E
- Country: Germany
- State: Brandenburg
- District: Potsdam-Mittelmark
- Municipal assoc.: Beetzsee
- Subdivisions: 4 Ortsteile

Government
  - Mayor (2024–29): Dirk Lange

Area
  - Total: 37.23 km^{2} (14.37 sq mi)
- Elevation: 37 m (121 ft)

Population (2025-12-31)
  - Total: 762
  - Density: 20.5/km^{2} (53.0/sq mi)
- Time zone: UTC+01:00 (CET)
  - Summer (DST): UTC+02:00 (CEST)
- Postal codes: 14778
- Dialling codes: 03381
- Vehicle registration: PM

Beetzseeheide is a municipality in the Potsdam-Mittelmark district, in Brandenburg, Germany.

== Demography ==
Development of Population since 1875 within the Current Boundaries (Blue Line: Population; Dotted Line: Comparison to Population Development of Brandenburg state; Grey Background: Time of Nazi rule; Red Background: Time of Communist rule)

Beetzseeheide: Population development
within the current boundaries (2013)

Year	Pop.	±% p.a.
1875	1,343	—
1890	1,346	+0.01%
1910	1,246	−0.39%
1925	1,199	−0.26%
1933	1,113	−0.93%
1939	1,117	+0.06%
1946	1,447	+3.77%
1950	1,424	−0.40%
1964	1,084	−1.93%
1971	996	−1.20%
1981	798	−2.19%
1985	782	−0.51%
1989	747	−1.14%
1990	718	−3.88%
1991	693	−3.48%
1992	677	−2.31%
1993	669	−1.18%
1994	654	−2.24%
1995	643	−1.68%
1996	637	−0.93%

Year	Pop.	±% p.a.
1997	643	+0.94%
1998	674	+4.82%
1999	685	+1.63%
2000	709	+3.50%
2001	710	+0.14%
2002	711	+0.14%
2003	722	+1.55%
2004	747	+3.46%
2005	725	−2.95%
2006	721	−0.55%
2007	703	−2.50%
2008	694	−1.28%
2009	669	−3.60%
2010	665	−0.60%
2011	654	−1.65%
2012	663	+1.38%
2013	645	−2.71%
2014	676	+4.81%
2015	675	−0.15%
2016	699	+3.56%
