= Golzow, Potsdam-Mittelmark =

Golzow
- Municipality
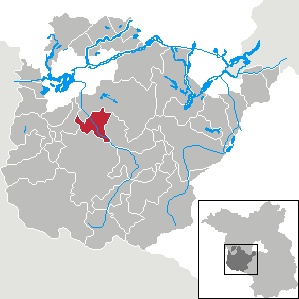
- Location of Golzow within Potsdam-Mittelmark district
- Interactive map of Golzow
- Location within Germany Location within Brandenburg
- Coordinates: 52°16′00″N 12°36′58″E
- Country: Germany
- State: Brandenburg
- District: Potsdam-Mittelmark
- Municipal assoc.: Brück
- Subdivisions: 5 Ortsteile

Government
  - Mayor (2024–29): Ralf Werner

Area
  - Total: 39.97 km^{2} (15.43 sq mi)
- Elevation: 42 m (138 ft)

Population (2025-12-31)
  - Total: 1,346
  - Density: 33.68/km^{2} (87.22/sq mi)
- Time zone: UTC+01:00 (CET)
  - Summer (DST): UTC+02:00 (CEST)
- Postal codes: 14778
- Dialling codes: 033835
- Vehicle registration: PM
- Website: www.amt-brueck.de

Golzow is a municipality in the Potsdam-Mittelmark district, in Brandenburg, Germany.

Within the municipality is a large forest, the Golzower Busch.

== Demography ==
Development of Population since 1875 within the Current Boundaries (Blue Line: Population; Dotted Line: Comparison to Population Development of Brandenburg state; Grey Background: Time of Nazi rule; Red Background: Time of Communist rule)

Golzow [Mittelmark]: Population development
within the current boundaries (2013)

Year	Pop.	±% p.a.
1875	1,426	—
1890	1,488	+0.28%
1910	1,441	−0.16%
1925	1,478	+0.17%
1933	1,453	−0.21%
1939	1,498	+0.51%
1946	1,852	+3.08%
1950	1,824	−0.38%
1964	1,587	−0.99%
1971	1,492	−0.88%
1981	1,541	+0.32%
1985	1,509	−0.52%
1989	1,522	+0.21%
1990	1,487	−2.30%
1991	1,469	−1.21%
1992	1,441	−1.91%
1993	1,448	+0.49%
1994	1,465	+1.17%
1995	1,472	+0.48%
1996	1,471	−0.07%

Year	Pop.	±% p.a.
1997	1,499	+1.90%
1998	1,487	−0.80%
1999	1,488	+0.07%
2000	1,463	−1.68%
2001	1,464	+0.07%
2002	1,439	−1.71%
2003	1,424	−1.04%
2004	1,406	−1.26%
2005	1,398	−0.57%
2006	1,390	−0.57%
2007	1,369	−1.51%
2008	1,361	−0.58%
2009	1,339	−1.62%
2010	1,334	−0.37%
2011	1,331	−0.22%
2012	1,331	+0.00%
2013	1,306	−1.88%
2014	1,324	+1.38%
2015	1,307	−1.28%
2016	1,313	+0.46%
