= Görzke =

- Municipality
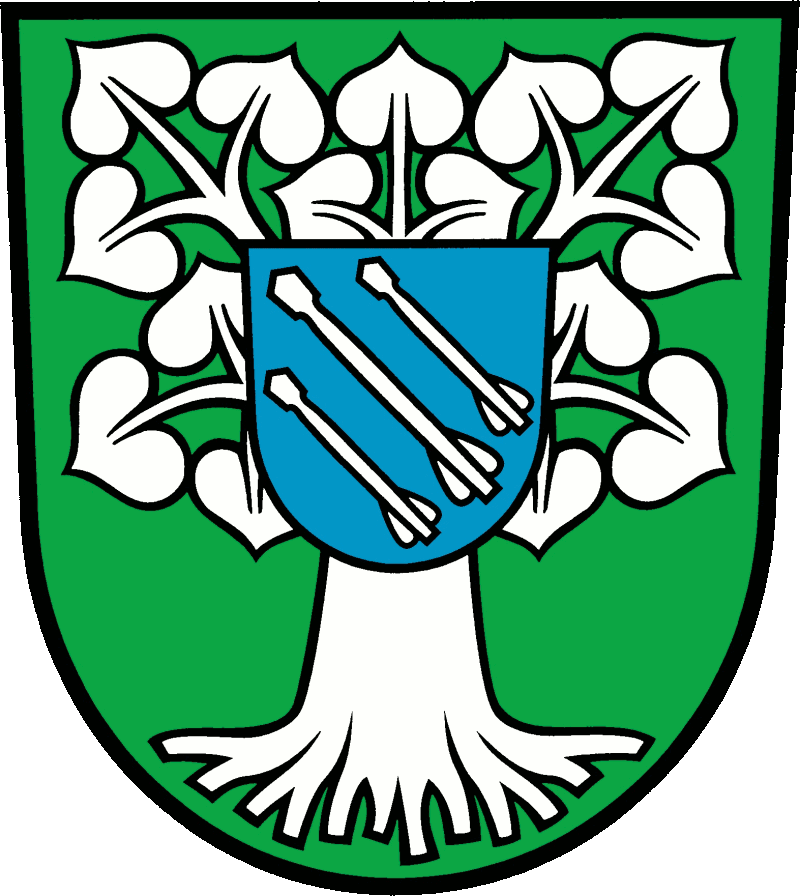
- Coat of arms

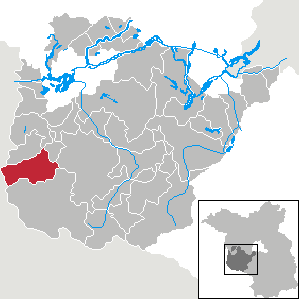
- Location of Görzke within Potsdam-Mittelmark district
- Interactive map of Görzke
- Location within Germany Location within Brandenburg
- Coordinates: 52°10′15″N 12°22′14″E
- Country: Germany
- State: Brandenburg
- District: Potsdam-Mittelmark
- Municipal assoc.: Ziesar
- Subdivisions: Görzke and 4 Ortsteile

Government
  - Mayor (2024–29): Anne Konstanze Eilzer

Area
  - Total: 75.21 km^{2} (29.04 sq mi)
- Elevation: 100 m (330 ft)

Population (2025-12-31)
  - Total: 1,156
  - Density: 15.37/km^{2} (39.81/sq mi)
- Time zone: UTC+01:00 (CET)
  - Summer (DST): UTC+02:00 (CEST)
- Postal codes: 14828
- Dialling codes: 033847
- Vehicle registration: PM

Görzke is a municipality in the Potsdam-Mittelmark district, in Brandenburg, Germany.

== Demography ==
Development of population since 1875 within the current Boundaries (Blue Line: Population; Dotted Line: Comparison to Population development in Brandenburg state; Grey Background: Time of Nazi Germany; Red Background: Time of communist East Germany)

Görzke: Population development
within the current boundaries (2013)

Year	Pop.	±% p.a.
1875	1,877	—
1890	1,877	+0.00%
1910	2,002	+0.32%
1925	2,002	+0.00%
1933	1,966	−0.23%
1939	2,048	+0.68%
1946	2,988	+5.54%
1950	2,908	−0.68%
1964	2,079	−2.37%
1971	2,117	+0.26%
1981	1,788	−1.67%
1985	1,740	−0.68%
1989	1,774	+0.48%
1990	1,761	−0.73%
1991	1,686	−4.26%
1992	1,656	−1.78%
1993	1,662	+0.36%
1994	1,665	+0.18%
1995	1,660	−0.30%
1996	1,659	−0.06%

Year	Pop.	±% p.a.
1997	1,650	−0.54%
1998	1,636	−0.85%
1999	1,621	−0.92%
2000	1,601	−1.23%
2001	1,582	−1.19%
2002	1,580	−0.13%
2003	1,553	−1.71%
2004	1,510	−2.77%
2005	1,471	−2.58%
2006	1,460	−0.75%
2007	1,421	−2.67%
2008	1,395	−1.83%
2009	1,363	−2.29%
2010	1,345	−1.32%
2011	1,296	−3.64%
2012	1,300	+0.31%
2013	1,260	−3.08%
2014	1,246	−1.11%
2015	1,240	−0.48%
2016	1,233	−0.56%
