= Wenzlow =

- Municipality
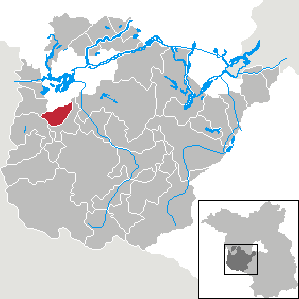
- Location of Wenzlow within Potsdam-Mittelmark district
- Interactive map of Wenzlow
- Location within Germany Location within Brandenburg
- Coordinates: 52°18′N 12°27′E
- Country: Germany
- State: Brandenburg
- District: Potsdam-Mittelmark
- Municipal assoc.: Ziesar

Government
  - Mayor (2024–29): Randy Matthies

Area
  - Total: 20.37 km^{2} (7.86 sq mi)
- Elevation: 37 m (121 ft)

Population (2025-12-31)
  - Total: 536
  - Density: 26.3/km^{2} (68.2/sq mi)
- Time zone: UTC+01:00 (CET)
  - Summer (DST): UTC+02:00 (CEST)
- Postal codes: 14778
- Dialling codes: 033833
- Vehicle registration: PM

Wenzlow is a municipality in the Potsdam-Mittelmark district, in Brandenburg, Germany.

== Demography ==
Development of population since 1875 within the current Boundaries (Blue Line: Population; Dotted Line: Comparison to Population development in Brandenburg state; Grey Background: Time of Nazi Germany; Red Background: Time of communist East Germany)

Wenzlow: Population development
within the current boundaries (2013)

Year	Pop.	±% p.a.
1875	806	—
1890	806	+0.00%
1910	806	+0.00%
1925	806	+0.00%
1933	805	−0.02%
1939	791	−0.29%
1946	1,072	+4.44%
1950	946	−3.08%
1964	773	−1.43%
1971	777	+0.07%
1981	676	−1.38%
1985	648	−1.05%
1989	652	+0.15%
1990	638	−2.15%
1991	620	−2.82%
1992	609	−1.77%
1993	612	+0.49%
1994	609	−0.49%
1995	613	+0.66%
1996	613	+0.00%

Year	Pop.	±% p.a.
1997	607	−0.98%
1998	639	+5.27%
1999	638	−0.16%
2000	648	+1.57%
2001	639	−1.39%
2002	645	+0.94%
2003	635	−1.55%
2004	611	−3.78%
2005	595	−2.62%
2006	591	−0.67%
2007	591	+0.00%
2008	575	−2.71%
2009	557	−3.13%
2010	562	+0.90%
2011	545	−3.02%
2012	541	−0.73%
2013	534	−1.29%
2014	532	−0.37%
2015	535	+0.56%
2016	543	+1.50%
