= Gräben =

- Municipality
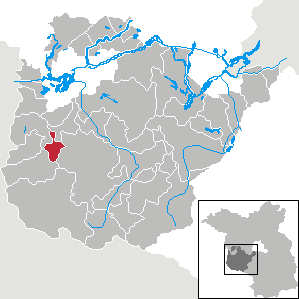
- Location of Gräben within Potsdam-Mittelmark district
- Interactive map of Gräben
- Location within Germany Location within Brandenburg
- Coordinates: 52°14′N 12°26′E
- Country: Germany
- State: Brandenburg
- District: Potsdam-Mittelmark
- Municipal assoc.: Ziesar

Government
  - Mayor (2024–29): Jutta Debler

Area
  - Total: 40.29 km^{2} (15.56 sq mi)
- Elevation: 65 m (213 ft)

Population (2025-12-31)
  - Total: 501
  - Density: 12.4/km^{2} (32.2/sq mi)
- Time zone: UTC+01:00 (CET)
  - Summer (DST): UTC+02:00 (CEST)
- Postal codes: 14793
- Dialling codes: 033833
- Vehicle registration: PM

Gräben is a municipality in the Potsdam-Mittelmark district, in Brandenburg, Germany.

== Demography ==
Development of population since 1875 within the current Boundaries (Blue Line: Population; Dotted Line: Comparison to Population development in Brandenburg state; Grey Background: Time of Nazi Germany; Red Background: Time of communist East Germany)

Gräben: Population development
within the current boundaries (2013)

Year	Pop.	±% p.a.
1875	650	—
1890	660	+0.10%
1910	730	+0.51%
1925	768	+0.34%
1933	752	−0.26%
1939	732	−0.45%
1946	1,107	+6.09%
1950	979	−3.03%
1964	853	−0.98%
1971	827	−0.44%
1981	773	−0.67%
1985	770	−0.10%
1989	758	−0.39%
1990	750	−1.06%
1991	729	−2.80%
1992	1,153	+58.16%
1993	1,272	+10.32%
1994	1,154	−9.28%
1995	1,242	+7.63%
1996	1,218	−1.93%

Year	Pop.	±% p.a.
1997	1,157	−5.01%
1998	1,161	+0.35%
1999	1,150	−0.95%
2000	1,149	−0.09%
2001	1,293	+12.53%
2002	918	−29.00%
2003	878	−4.36%
2004	635	−27.68%
2005	617	−2.83%
2006	623	+0.97%
2007	602	−3.37%
2008	595	−1.16%
2009	593	−0.34%
2010	580	−2.19%
2011	540	−6.90%
2012	529	−2.04%
2013	536	+1.32%
2014	523	−2.43%
2015	531	+1.53%
2016	510	−3.95%
