= Bensdorf =

- Municipality
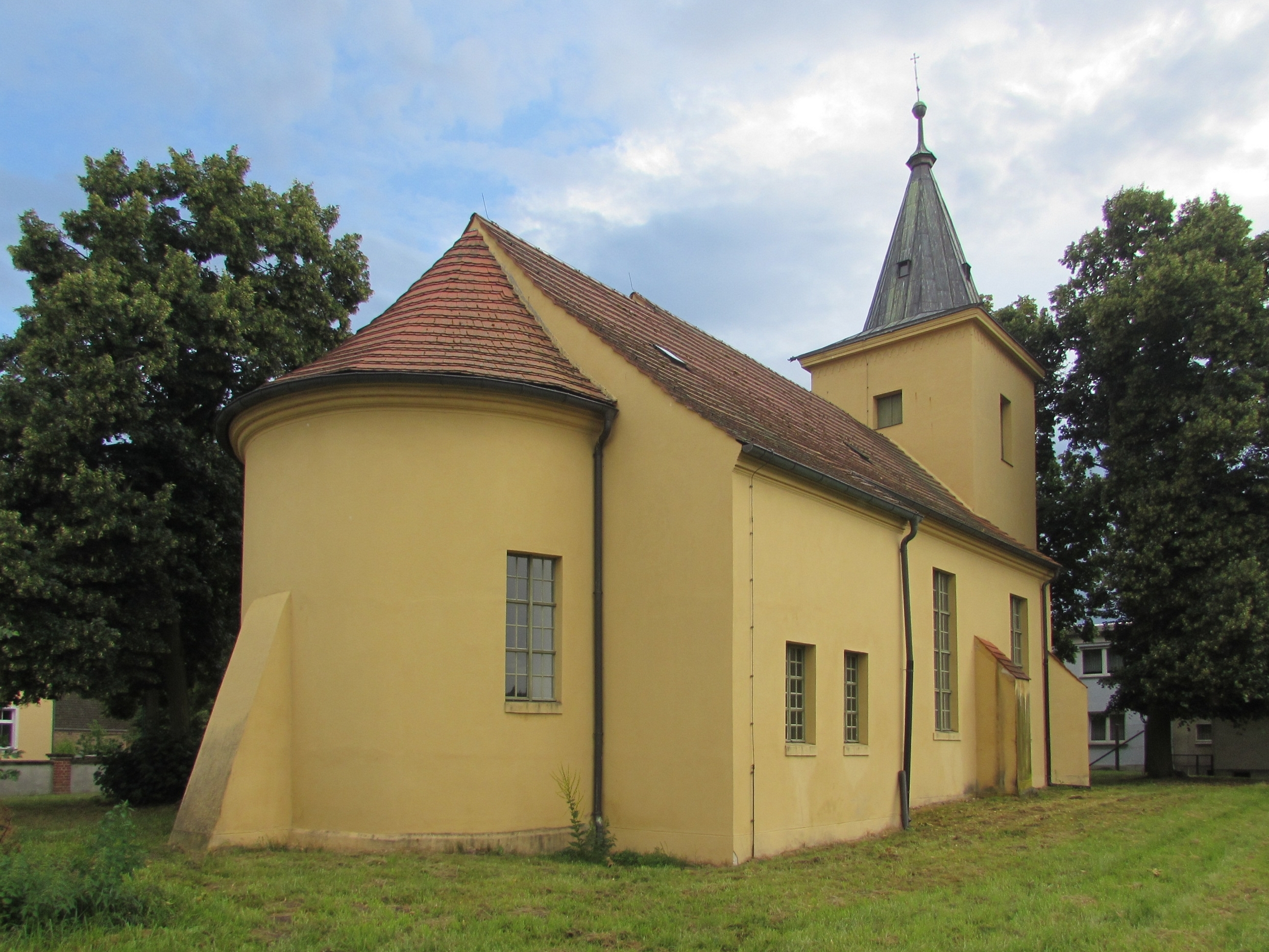
- Church in Altbensdorf

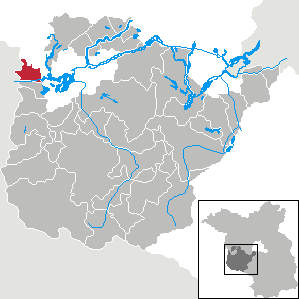
- Location of Bensdorf within Potsdam-Mittelmark district
- Interactive map of Bensdorf
- Location within Germany Location within Brandenburg
- Coordinates: 52°25′00″N 12°19′59″E
- Country: Germany
- State: Brandenburg
- District: Potsdam-Mittelmark
- Municipal assoc.: Wusterwitz
- Subdivisions: 5 Ortsteile

Government
  - Mayor (2024–29): Jens Borngräber

Area
  - Total: 34.13 km^{2} (13.18 sq mi)
- Elevation: 31 m (102 ft)

Population (2025-12-31)
  - Total: 1,242
  - Density: 36.39/km^{2} (94.25/sq mi)
- Time zone: UTC+01:00 (CET)
  - Summer (DST): UTC+02:00 (CEST)
- Postal codes: 14789
- Dialling codes: 033839
- Vehicle registration: PM

Bensdorf is a municipality in the Potsdam-Mittelmark district, in Brandenburg, Germany.

== Demography ==
Development of Population since 1875 within the Current Boundaries (Blue Line: Population; Dotted Line: Comparison to Population Development of Brandenburg state; Grey Background: Time of Nazi rule; Red Background: Time of Communist rule)

Bensdorf: Population development
within the current boundaries (2013)

Year	Pop.	±% p.a.
1875	1,200	—
1890	1,300	+0.54%
1910	1,500	+0.72%
1925	1,763	+1.08%
1933	1,783	+0.14%
1939	1,860	+0.71%
1946	2,284	+2.98%
1950	2,276	−0.09%
1964	1,682	−2.14%
1971	1,493	−1.69%
1981	1,231	−1.91%
1985	1,208	−0.47%
1989	1,191	−0.35%
1990	1,194	+0.25%
1991	1,170	−2.01%
1992	1,170	+0.00%
1993	1,131	−3.33%
1994	1,137	+0.53%
1995	1,138	+0.09%
1996	1,149	+0.97%

Year	Pop.	±% p.a.
1997	1,341	+16.71%
1998	1,366	+1.86%
1999	1,440	+5.42%
2000	1,411	−2.01%
2001	1,411	+0.00%
2002	1,411	+0.00%
2003	1,371	−2.83%
2004	1,367	−0.29%
2005	1,368	+0.07%
2006	1,352	−1.17%
2007	1,333	−1.41%
2008	1,292	−3.08%
2009	1,273	−1.47%
2010	1,240	−2.59%
2011	1,266	+2.10%
2012	1,284	+1.42%
2013	1,262	−1.71%
2014	1,270	+0.63%
2015	1,235	−2.76%
2016	1,236	+0.08%
