= Ziesar (Amt) =

- Amt
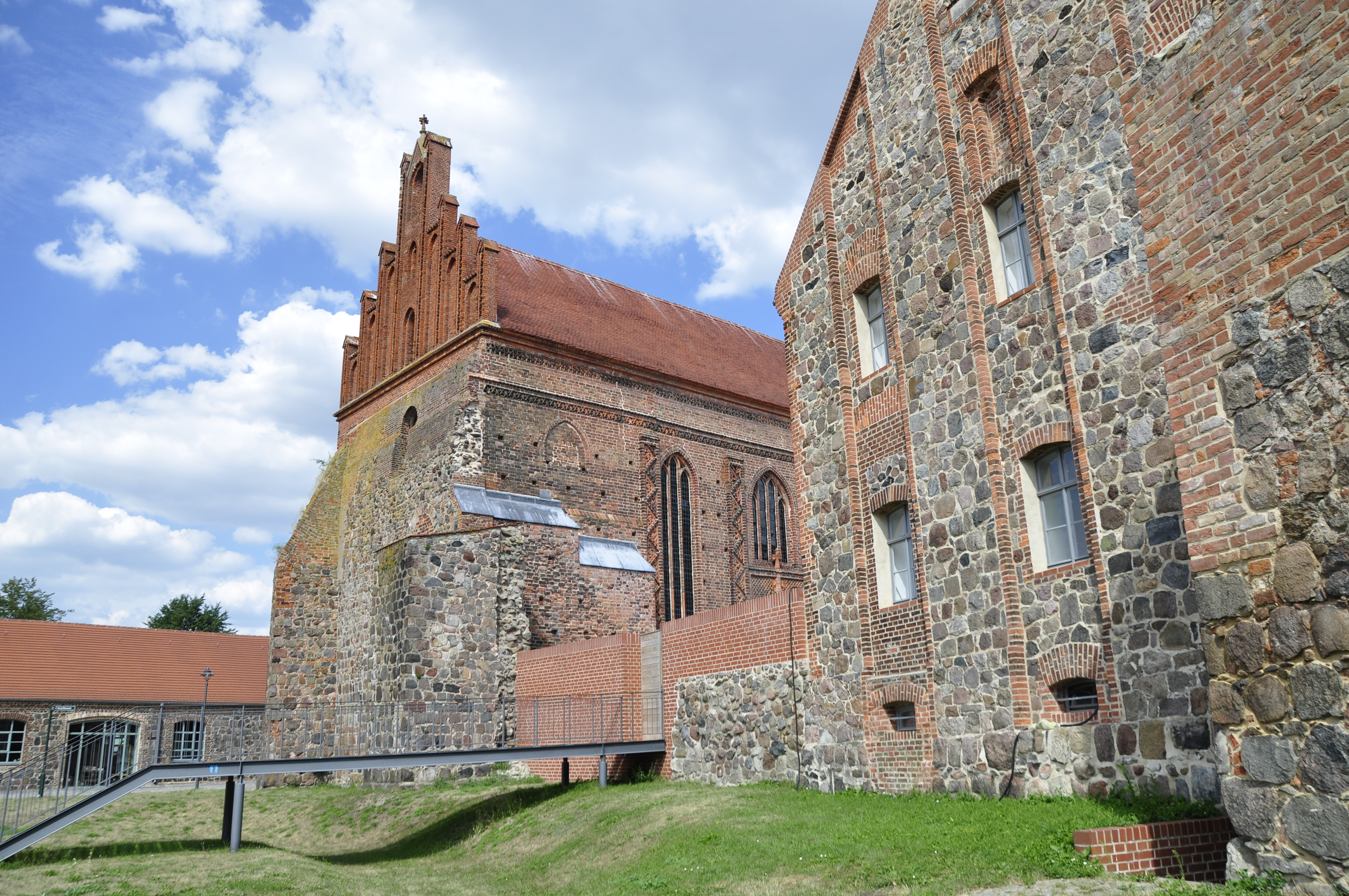
- Burg Ziesar

- Map of Potsdam-Mittelmark highlighting Ziesar
- Interactive map of Ziesar
- Location within Germany Location within Brandenburg
- Coordinates: 52°15′46″N 12°17′12″E
- Country: Germany
- State: Brandenburg
- District: Potsdam-Mittelmark
- Seat: Ziesar
- Subdivisions: 6 municipalities

Area
  - Total: 272 km^{2} (105 sq mi)

Population (2025-12-31)
  - Total: 5,844
  - Density: 21.5/km^{2} (55.6/sq mi)
- Time zone: UTC+01:00 (CET)
  - Summer (DST): UTC+02:00 (CEST)
- Website: www.amt-ziesar.de

Amt Ziesar (German pronunciation: [tsiˈeːzaʁ]) is an Amt ("collective municipality") in the district of Potsdam-Mittelmark, in Brandenburg, Germany. Its seat is in Ziesar.

The Amt Ziesar consists of the following municipalities:

1. Buckautal
2. Görzke
3. Gräben
4. Wenzlow
5. Wollin
6. Ziesar

== Demography ==
Development of population since 1875 within the current Boundaries (Blue Line: Population; Dotted Line: Comparison to Population development in Brandenburg state; Grey Background: Time of Nazi Germany; Red Background: Time of communist East Germany)

Recent Population Development and Projections (Population Development before Census 2011 (blue line); Recent Population Development according to the Census in Germany in 2011 (blue bordered line); Official projections for 2005-2030 (yellow line); for 2017-2030 (scarlet line); for 2020-2030 (green line)

Amt Ziesar: Population development
within the current boundaries (2020)

Year	Pop.	±% p.a.
1875	8,518	—
1890	8,567	+0.04%
1910	8,861	+0.17%
1925	8,960	+0.07%
1939	9,050	+0.07%
1950	12,041	+2.63%
1964	9,509	−1.67%
1971	8,950	−0.86%
1981	8,135	−0.95%

Year	Pop.	±% p.a.
1985	7,962	−0.54%
1990	7,809	−0.39%
1995	8,023	+0.54%
2000	7,962	−0.15%
2005	6,968	−2.63%
2010	6,464	−1.49%
2015	6,109	−1.12%
2020	6,083	−0.09%
2025	5,844	−0.80%
