= Borkheide =

Municipality in Brandenburg, Germany

- Municipality
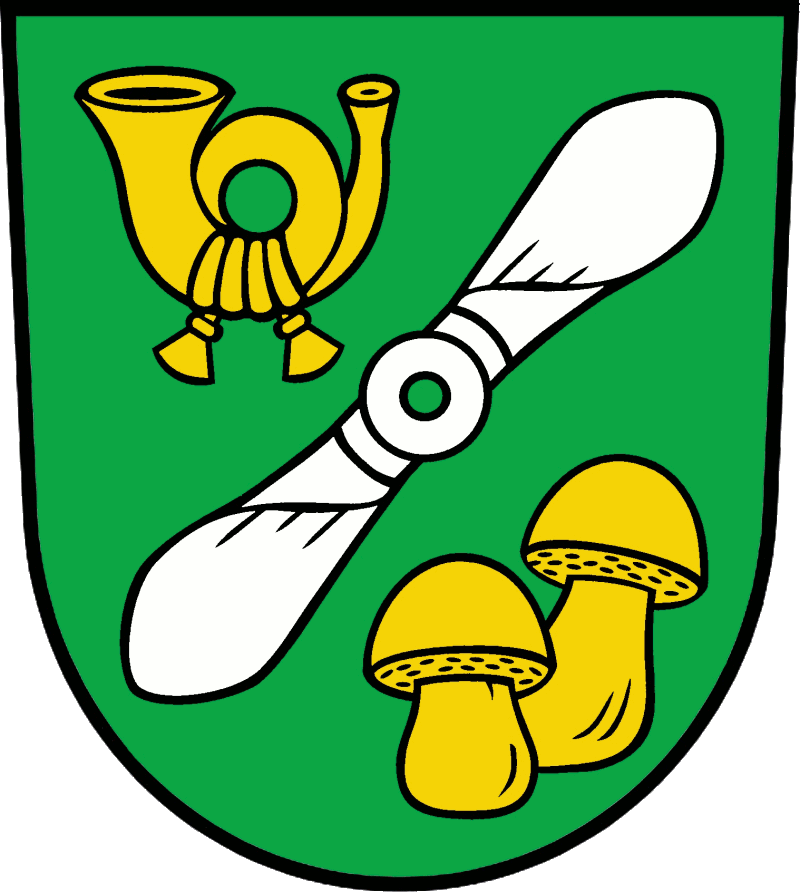
- Coat of arms

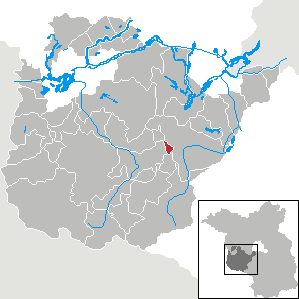
- Location of Borkheide within Potsdam-Mittelmark district
- Interactive map of Borkheide
- Location within Germany Location within Brandenburg
- Coordinates: 52°13′00″N 12°50′59″E
- Country: Germany
- State: Brandenburg
- District: Potsdam-Mittelmark
- Municipal assoc.: Brück

Government
  - Mayor (2024–29): Steffi Randig

Area
  - Total: 6.73 km^{2} (2.60 sq mi)
- Elevation: 58 m (190 ft)

Population (2025-12-31)
  - Total: 2,208
  - Density: 328/km^{2} (850/sq mi)
- Time zone: UTC+01:00 (CET)
  - Summer (DST): UTC+02:00 (CEST)
- Postal codes: 14822
- Dialling codes: 033845
- Vehicle registration: PM

Borkheide is a municipality in the Potsdam-Mittelmark district, in Brandenburg, Germany.

== History ==
From 1815 to 1947, Borkheide was part of the Prussian Province of Brandenburg. From 1952 to 1990, it was part of the Bezirk Potsdam of East Germany.

== Demography ==
Development of Population since 1875 within the Current Boundaries (Blue Line: Population; Dotted Line: Comparison to Population Development of Brandenburg state; Grey Background: Time of Nazi rule; Red Background: Time of Communist rule)

Borkheide: Population development
within the current boundaries (2013)

Year	Pop.	±% p.a.
1875	150	—
1890	150	+0.00%
1910	150	+0.00%
1925	156	+0.26%
1933	420	+13.18%
1939	628	+6.93%
1946	1,520	+13.46%
1950	1,382	−2.35%
1964	1,232	−0.82%
1971	1,227	−0.06%
1981	1,107	−1.02%
1985	1,104	−0.07%
1989	1,077	−0.62%
1990	1,066	−1.02%
1991	1,085	+1.78%
1992	1,109	+2.21%
1993	1,139	+2.71%
1994	1,351	+18.61%
1995	1,505	+11.40%
1996	1,650	+9.63%

Year	Pop.	±% p.a.
1997	1,686	+2.18%
1998	1,749	+3.74%
1999	1,789	+2.29%
2000	1,819	+1.68%
2001	1,833	+0.77%
2002	1,826	−0.38%
2003	1,824	−0.11%
2004	1,883	+3.23%
2005	1,873	−0.53%
2006	1,865	−0.43%
2007	1,875	+0.54%
2008	1,879	+0.21%
2009	1,878	−0.05%
2010	1,857	−1.12%
2011	1,875	+0.97%
2012	1,850	−1.33%
2013	1,877	+1.46%
2014	1,895	+0.96%
2015	1,924	+1.53%
2016	1,953	+1.51%
