= Potsdam-Mittelmark =

Coordinates: 52°12′N 12°45′E

- District
- Flag Coat of arms
- Country: Germany
- State: Brandenburg
- Capital: Bad Belzig

Government
  - District admin.: Marko Köhler (SPD)

Area
  - Total: 2,575.4 km^{2} (994.4 sq mi)

Population (31 December 2025)
  - Total: 221,347
  - Density: 85.947/km^{2} (222.60/sq mi)
- Time zone: UTC+01:00 (CET)
  - Summer (DST): UTC+02:00 (CEST)
- Vehicle registration: PM
- Website: potsdam-mittelmark.de

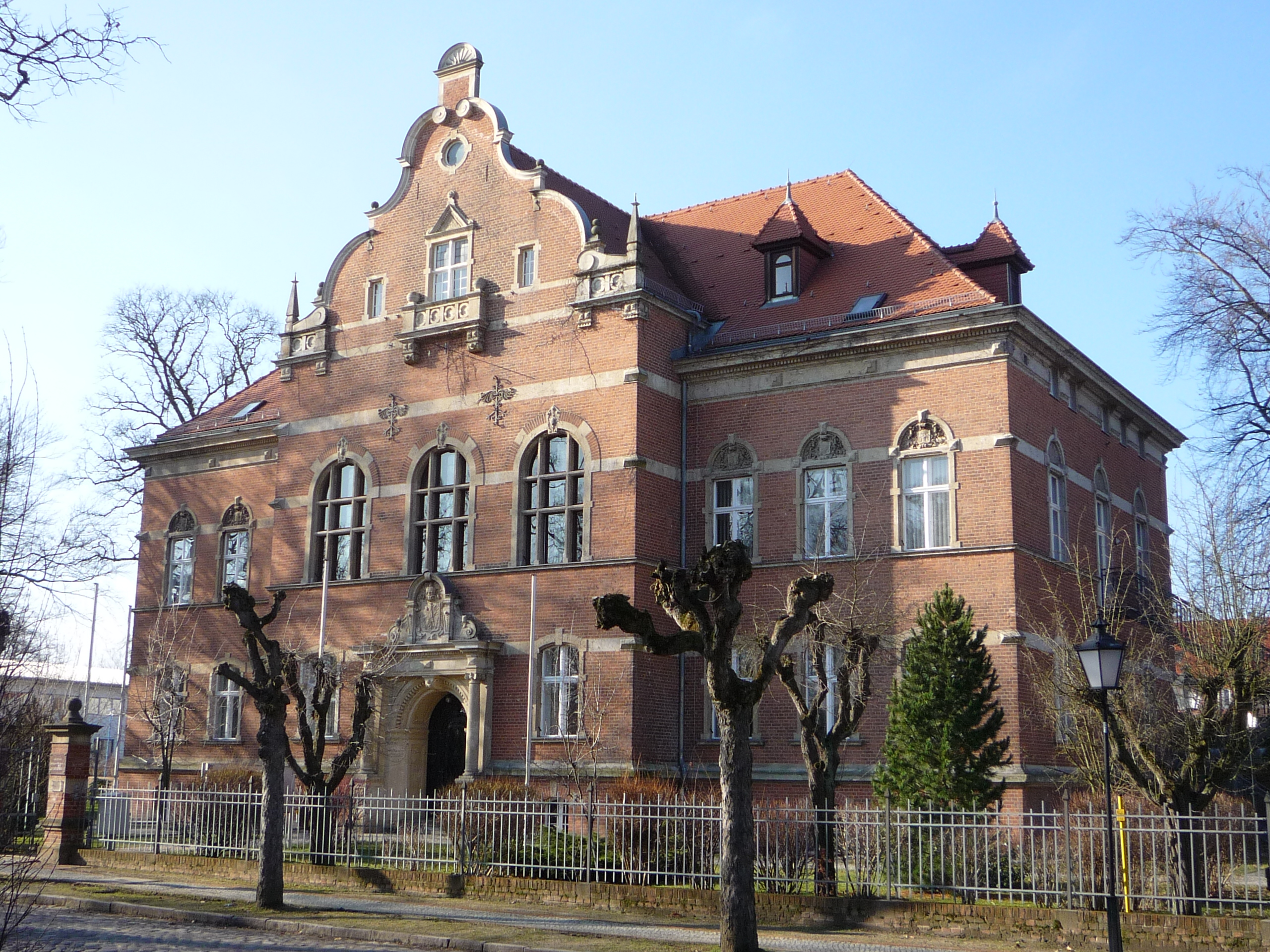
Landratsamt Bad Belzig

Potsdam-Mittelmark is a Kreis (district) in the western part of Brandenburg, Germany. Its neighbouring administrative units are (clockwise from the north) the district of Havelland, the free cities of Brandenburg and Potsdam, the state of Berlin, the district of Teltow-Fläming, and the districts of Wittenberg, Anhalt-Bitterfeld and Jerichower Land in Saxony-Anhalt.

== Geography ==
The district includes the southern banks of the Havel river and the northern parts of the Fläming (a wooded hill chain). There are three nature parks in the district: High Fläming Nature Park, Nuthe-Nieplitz Nature Park and Westhavelland Nature Park.

== History ==
The district was created in 1993 by merging the previous districts of Belzig, Brandenburg-Land and Potsdam-Land.

== Demography ==
Development of Population since 1875 within the Current Boundaries (Blue Line: Population; Dotted Line: Comparison to Population Development of Brandenburg state)

Recent Population Development and Projections (Population Development before Census 2011 (blue line); Recent Population Development according to the Census in Germany in 2011 (blue bordered line); Official projections for 2005-2030 (yellow line); for 2014-2030 (red line); for 2017-2030 (scarlet line)

Landkreis Potsdam-Mittelmark: Population development
within the current boundaries (2025)

Year	Pop.	±% p.a.
1875	97,780	—
1890	105,144	+0.49%
1910	117,118	+0.54%
1925	125,508	+0.46%
1933	141,531	+1.51%
1939	171,777	+3.28%
1946	205,184	+2.57%
1950	204,933	−0.03%
1964	180,055	−0.92%
1971	179,936	−0.01%

Year	Pop.	±% p.a.
1981	169,676	−0.59%
1985	168,383	−0.19%
1990	164,964	−0.41%
1995	171,626	+0.79%
2000	196,644	+2.76%
2005	203,477	+0.69%
2010	205,070	+0.16%
2015	210,910	+0.56%
2020	217,954	+0.66%
2025	221,347	+0.31%

== Coat of arms ==
The coat of arms is divided into four fields. The left top one shows a red eagle as the symbol of Brandenburg. The three oak-leaves in the top right both symbolize the prevalent oak forests, but also the three previous districts which were merged to form the current one. In the bottom right are two bishopric keys, which stand for the diocese of Brandenburg. The black-and-golden bars in the bottom left are the symbol of Saxony, and symbolize that the area around Belzig, Brück, Wiesenburg and Niemegk belonged to Saxony until 1815.

== Towns and municipalities ==
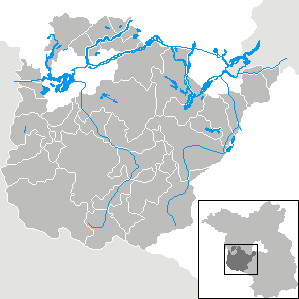
Clickable map of towns and municipalities in the district

Amt-free towns	Ämter
1. Bad Belzig; 2. Beelitz; 3. Teltow; 4. Treuenbrietzen; 5. Werder (Havel); Amt-free municipalities: 1. Groß Kreutz; 2. Kleinmachnow; 3. Kloster Lehnin; 4. Michendorf; 5. Nuthetal; 6. Schwielowsee; 7. Seddiner See; 8. Stahnsdorf; 9. Wiesenburg	1. Beetzsee; 1. Beetzsee^{1}; 2. Beetzseeheide; 3. Havelsee^{2}; 4. Päwesin; 5. Roskow; 2. Brück; 1. Borkheide; 2. Borkwalde; 3. Brück^{1, 2}; 4. Golzow; 5. Linthe; 6. Planebruch; 3. Niemegk; 1. Mühlenfließ; 2. Niemegk^{1, 2}; 3. Planetal; 4. Rabenstein	4. Wusterwitz; 1. Bensdorf; 2. Rosenau; 3. Wusterwitz^{1}; 5. Ziesar; 1. Buckautal; 2. Görzke; 3. Gräben; 4. Wenzlow; 5. Wollin; 6. Ziesar^{1, 2}
^{1}seat of the Amt; ^{2}town
