= Rosenau, Brandenburg =

Rosenau
- Municipality
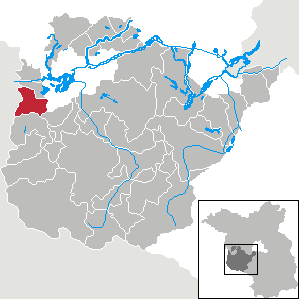
- Location of Rosenau within Potsdam-Mittelmark district
- Interactive map of Rosenau
- Location within Germany Location within Brandenburg
- Coordinates: 52°19′45″N 12°21′29″E
- Country: Germany
- State: Brandenburg
- District: Potsdam-Mittelmark
- Municipal assoc.: Wusterwitz
- Subdivisions: 4 Ortsteile

Government
  - Mayor (2024–29): Denny Post

Area
  - Total: 49.36 km^{2} (19.06 sq mi)
- Elevation: 40 m (130 ft)

Population (2025-12-31)
  - Total: 845
  - Density: 17.1/km^{2} (44.3/sq mi)
- Time zone: UTC+01:00 (CET)
  - Summer (DST): UTC+02:00 (CEST)
- Postal codes: 14789
- Dialling codes: 033832
- Vehicle registration: PM
- Website: www.amt-wusterwitz.de

Rosenau is a municipality in the Potsdam-Mittelmark district, in Brandenburg, Germany.

== Demography ==
Development of population since 1875 within the current Boundaries (Blue Line: Population; Dotted Line: Comparison to Population development in Brandenburg state; Grey Background: Time of Nazi Germany; Red Background: Time of communist East Germany)

Rosenau [Brandenburg]: Population development
within the current boundaries (2013)

Year	Pop.	±% p.a.
1875	1,462	—
1890	1,553	+0.40%
1910	1,652	+0.31%
1925	1,619	−0.13%
1933	1,436	−1.49%
1939	1,337	−1.18%
1946	1,960	+5.62%
1950	2,382	+5.00%
1964	1,848	−1.80%
1971	1,707	−1.13%
1981	1,293	−2.74%
1985	1,237	−1.10%
1989	1,232	−0.10%
1990	1,200	−2.60%
1991	1,193	−0.58%
1992	1,181	−1.01%
1993	1,076	−8.89%
1994	1,084	+0.74%
1995	1,077	−0.65%
1996	1,071	−0.56%

Year	Pop.	±% p.a.
1997	1,032	−3.64%
1998	1,050	+1.74%
1999	1,049	−0.10%
2000	1,037	−1.14%
2001	1,040	+0.29%
2002	1,030	−0.96%
2003	997	−3.20%
2004	992	−0.50%
2005	1,004	+1.21%
2006	985	−1.89%
2007	998	+1.32%
2008	981	−1.70%
2009	956	−2.55%
2010	950	−0.63%
2011	939	−1.16%
2012	918	−2.24%
2013	923	+0.54%
2014	916	−0.76%
2015	933	+1.86%
2016	935	+0.21%
