= Adolph Friedrich Johann Riedel =

German antiquarian, industrialist and politician

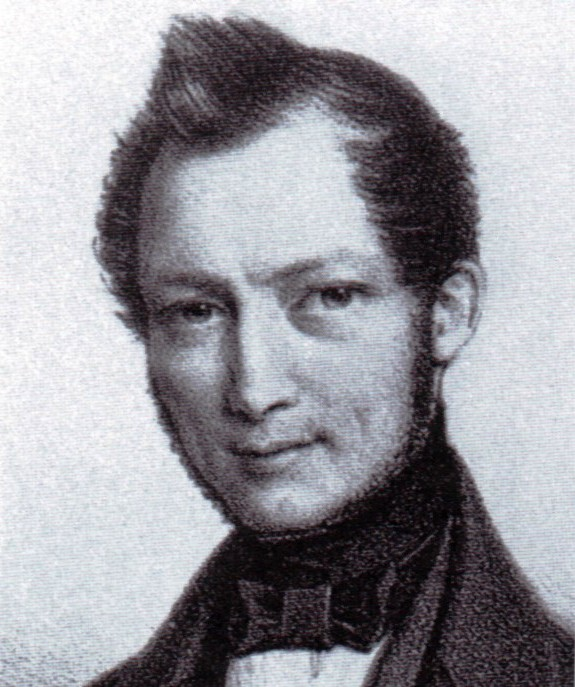
Adolph Friedrich Johann Riedel

Adolph Friedrich Johann Riedel (1809 in Biendorf – 1872 in Berlin) was a German (Prussian) antiquarian, industrialist and politician, author of Codex diplomaticus Brandenburgensis, a collection of primary documents on the history of the Margraviate of Brandenburg, in 36 volumes.

Riedel studied theology and philology at the University of Berlin, where he served as assistant professor from 1832. He was naturalized as a Prussian citizen in 1833 and was employed in the state archive. He was promoted to Hofrat in 1836 and to Geheimer Archivrat in 1842, from which time he was also professor for political science at Berlin University. In 1837, he co-founded the Historical Society of Brandenburg (Vereins für Geschichte der Mark Brandenburg). In 1851 he was admitted as a member of the Prussian Academy of Sciences, and from 1868 he was official historiographer for Brandenburg.

He was also member of the directorate of the Berlin–Wrocław and Berlin-Anhalt railway companies, and member of the directorate of the Sugar beet industry. In 1848, he was a member of the Prussian National Assembly for Niederbarnim, and in 1850 member of the Erfurt parliament, and between 1849 and 1855 and again between 1859 and 1861 member of the Prussian House of Representatives, first for the right-wing faction of Graf von Arnim-Boitzenburg, later for the left-wing faction of Karl Freiherr von Vincke.
