= Andreas Angelus =

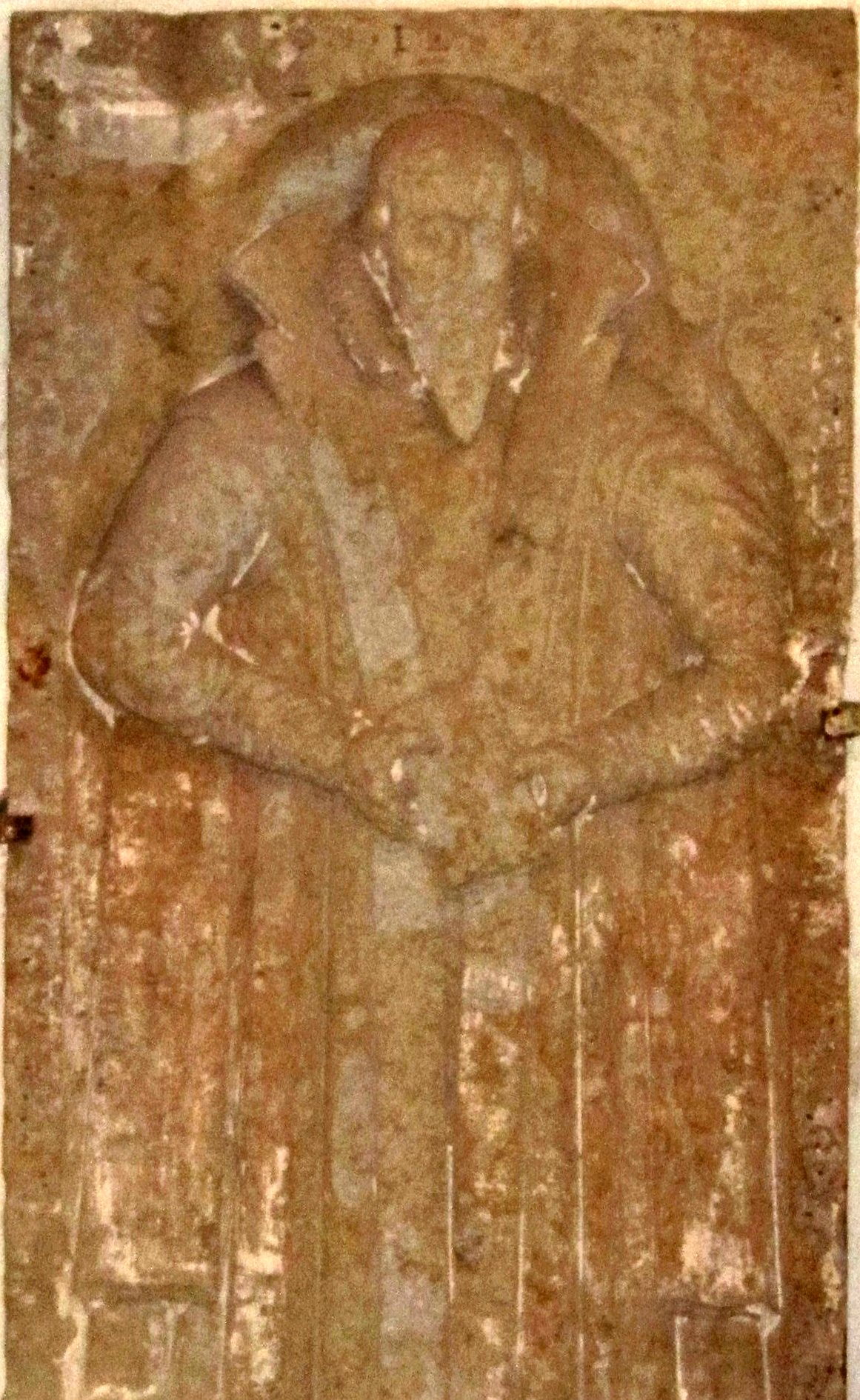
Epitaph of Andreas Angelus in St. Mary's Church in Strausberg

Andreas Angelus (German name Andreas Engel, 16 November 1561 – 9 August 1598) was a German clergyman, teacher and government inspector, known for his chronicles of the history of the Margraviate of Brandenburg.

== Biography ==
Engel was born in Strausberg, Germany, the son of Gregorius Engel, a member of the town council. At the early age of 12 he was admitted to the Alma Mater Viadrina, the university of Frankfurt an der Oder (now the Viadrina European University). His family died in 1575 of the plague, after which he left Brandenburg; he is recorded in 1577 as a pupil of the Marienstiftsgymnasium in Stettin. Later he lived for some time in Holstein where he wrote a chronicle of Holstein. From about 1580 he can be traced once again in Brandenburg, in various educational posts: conrector and cantor in Strausberg from 1582; rector in Strausberg 1584-1586; conrector in the Neustadt of Brandenburg an der Havel 1586-87; also as a teacher in the Franciscans' school in Berlin (now the Berlinisches Gymnasium zum Grauen Kloster).

On 14 September 1592 he married Sabina, eldest daughter of Jacob Colerus, provost of the church of St. Nicholas in Berlin, and in the same year was made pastor (and inspector) in his birthplace Strausberg.

From this time he started to write his three works on the history of the Mark Brandenburg, which, although they had Latin titles, were written entirely in German. His principal work was a comprehensive history under the working title Marchia. In about 1593 the first published volume drawn from this work appeared under the title Rerum Marchicarum Breviarum, and two years later a further volume entitled Annales Marchiae Brandenburgicae. Angelus cites some 200 printed works and a further twenty or so, which at that time were available only in manuscript.

He planned a third volume to complete the published history, but he died of the plague on 9 August 1598 and the unfinished manuscript of the third part was burnt by his widow after his death, apparently because of some sort of financial dispute.

== Published works ==
- Annales Marchiae Brandenburgicae, das ist ordentliche Verzeichnus und Beschreibung der fürnemsten und gedenckwirdigsten Märkischen Jahrgeschichten und Historien, so sich vom 416. Jahr vor Christi Geburt bis aufs 1596 Jahr zugetragen haben. Frankfurt a.d. Oder 1598.
- Rerum Marchicarum Breviarum, Das Ist Kurtze Beschreibung der vornembsten geschichten und HIstorien, so sich vor und nach Christi Geburt als uber 2000 Jahren in chur und Fürstenthumb der Mark Brandenburg bis auff gegenwertiges 1593. Jahr begeben und zugetragen haben. Wittenberg 1593.
