= Beetzsee =

Lake in Germany

- Location within Brandenburg
- Location: Brandenburg
- Coordinates: 52.445833°N 12.566667°E
- Primary outflows: River Havel
- Basin countries: Germany
- Max. length: 22 kilometres (14 mi)
- Average depth: 3 metres (9.8 ft)
- Max. depth: 9 metres (30 ft)

The Beetzsee is a lake in the state of Brandenburg, Germany. It is situated to the north and east of the city of Brandenburg an der Havel. It consists of four lake separate lake basins, which are connected by narrow channels. The uppermost of these basins is also known as the Riewendsee.

The lake is 22 kilometres (14 mi) long, and has a maximum depth of 9 metres (30 ft), with an average depth of 3 metres (9.8 ft).

The lake is navigable and connects, at its southern end, to the River Havel and the Silo Canal. Navigation is administered as part of the Untere Havel–Wasserstraße.
