= Plane (river) =

River in Germany

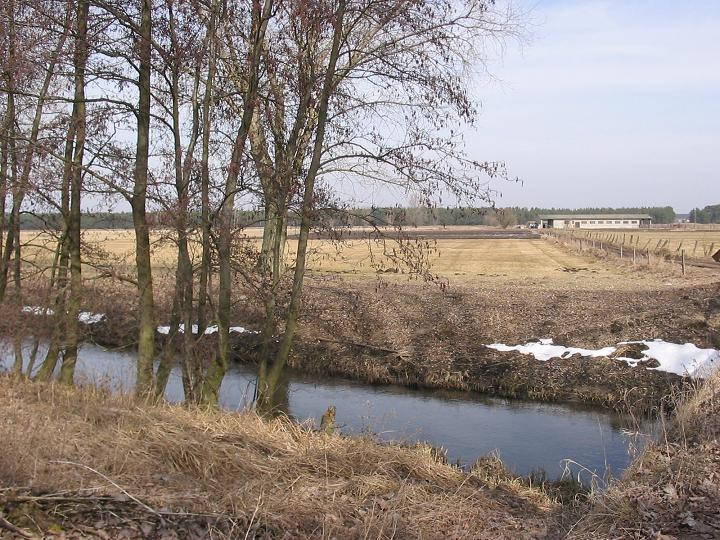

Location
- Country: Germany

Physical characteristics
- Source
  - location: Brandenburg
- Mouth
  - location: Havel
  - coordinates: 52°23′6″N 12°29′34″E
- Length: 57 km (35 mi)

Basin features
- Progression: Havel→ Elbe→ North Sea

The Plane is a river in Brandenburg, Germany, left tributary of the Havel. Its total length is 57 kilometres (35 mi). The Plane originates in the High Fläming Nature Park, near Rabenstein. It flows north through Planetal and Golzow. The Plane joins the Havel in the Breitlingsee lake west of Brandenburg an der Havel.
