= Niemegk =

- Town
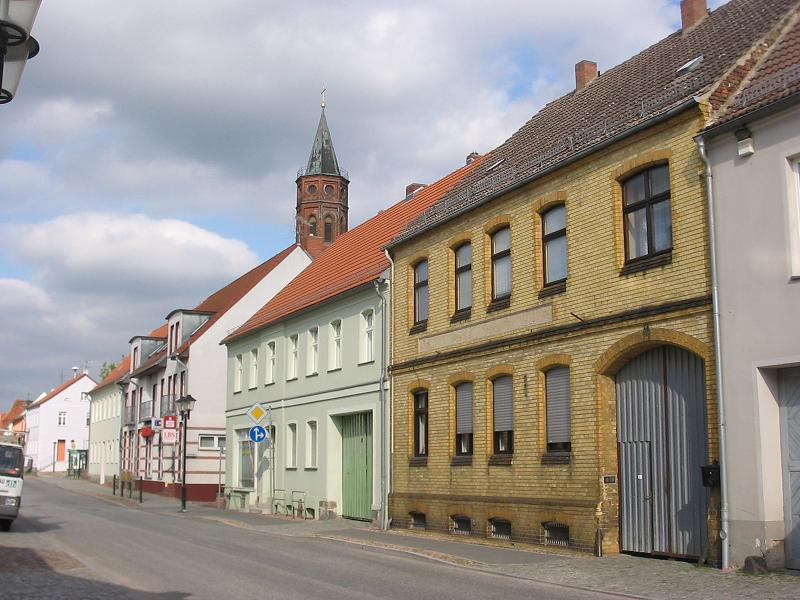
- Main road

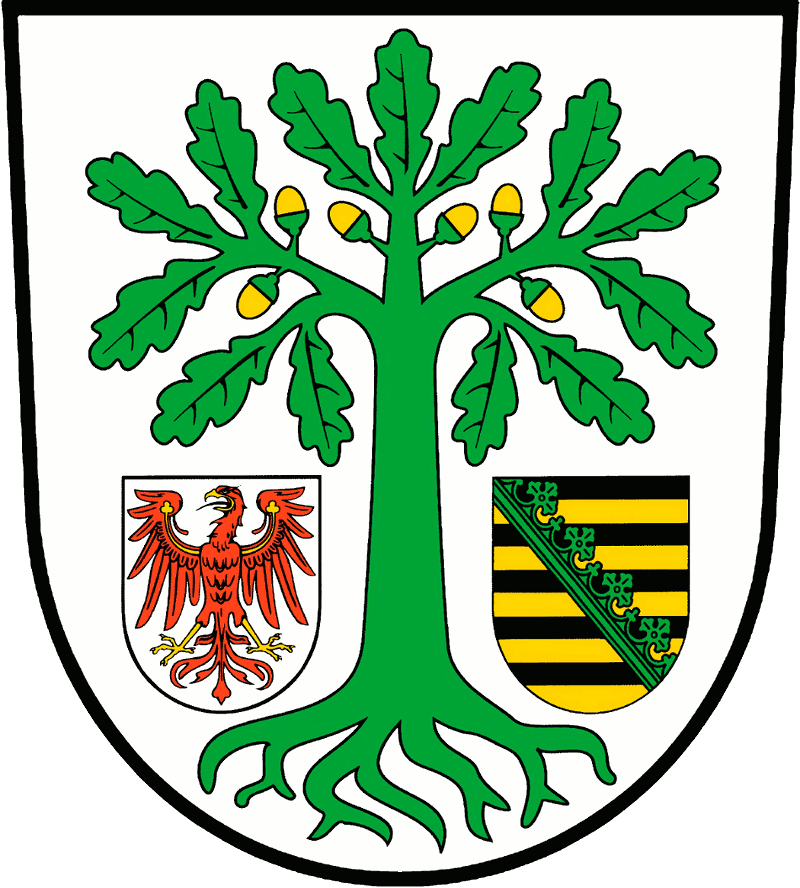
- Coat of arms

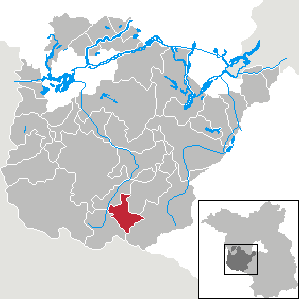
- Location of Niemegk within Potsdam-Mittelmark district
- Interactive map of Niemegk
- Location within Germany Location within Brandenburg
- Coordinates: 52°05′N 12°42′E
- Country: Germany
- State: Brandenburg
- District: Potsdam-Mittelmark
- Municipal assoc.: Niemegk
- Subdivisions: 2 Ortsteile

Government
  - Mayor (2024–29): Jens Bornfleth

Area
  - Total: 45.12 km^{2} (17.42 sq mi)
- Elevation: 75 m (246 ft)

Population (2025-12-31)
  - Total: 2,019
  - Density: 44.75/km^{2} (115.9/sq mi)
- Time zone: UTC+01:00 (CET)
  - Summer (DST): UTC+02:00 (CEST)
- Postal codes: 14823
- Dialling codes: 033843
- Vehicle registration: PM
- Website: www.amt-niemegk.de

Niemegk (German pronunciation: [ˈniːmɛk]) is a town in the Potsdam-Mittelmark district, in Brandenburg, in eastern Germany. It is the administrative seat of the Amt ("collective municipality") Niemegk.

== Geography ==
The municipal area is situated on the northeastern slopes of the Fläming Heath, east of the Plane river. The surrounding region comprises farmland and extended forests adjoining the High Fläming Nature Park. The town centre is located about 10 km (6.2 mi) southeast of Bad Belzig, and 23 km (14 mi) north of Wittenberg.

The town has access to the Bundesautobahn 9 highway at the Niemegk junction.

== History ==
A Burgward at the former site of a Slavic fortress (gord) was first mentioned in an 1161 deed, at the time when the Ascanian margrave Albert the Bear conquered the Hevelli lands in the north. The name Nymik or Niemeke is possibly derived from the town of Nijmegen in the Low Countries, the place of origin of German settlers. The estates were held by the Teutonic Order and the former village was vested with town privileges in 1228.

Since the mid 13th century, the area was part of the Ascanian Duchy of Saxe-Wittenberg and, from 1356, of the Saxon electorate. Located on its northeastern border, it was the scene of numerous conflicts with Brandenburg knights and the forces of the Magdeburg archbishops. The town again suffered from Hussite raids in 1429, marauding Imperial troops after the Saxon defeat at the 1547 Battle of Mühlberg, and was devastated in the Thirty Years' War.

After the Napoleonic Wars and the 1815 Congress of Vienna, the town fell to Prussia and was incorporated into the Province of Brandenburg. From 1868, young Robert Koch worked in Niemegk as a country doctor.

During World War II, Niemegk was the location of a subcamp of the Sachsenhausen concentration camp for prisoners of various nationalities, especially Norwegians, but also Dutch, Poles (including kidnapped children, which were to be Germanized and adopted by German families), French, Czechs, Russians, Britons, Germans. After the war, the town was part of East Germany.

== Demography ==
Development of population since 1875 within the current boundaries (Blue line: Population; Dotted line: Comparison to population development of Brandenburg state; Grey background: Time of Nazi rule; Red background: Time of communist rule)

Niemegk: Population development
within the current boundaries (2013)

Year	Pop.	±% p.a.
1875	2,647	—
1890	2,606	−0.10%
1910	2,789	+0.34%
1925	2,749	−0.10%
1933	2,780	+0.14%
1939	3,303	+2.91%
1946	3,819	+2.10%
1950	3,694	−0.83%
1964	3,148	−1.14%
1971	3,081	−0.31%
1981	2,714	−1.26%
1985	2,649	−0.60%
1989	2,594	−0.52%
1990	2,530	−2.47%
1991	2,428	−4.03%
1992	2,396	−1.32%
1993	2,382	−0.58%
1994	2,399	+0.71%
1995	2,408	+0.38%
1996	2,354	−2.24%

Year	Pop.	±% p.a.
1997	2,341	−0.55%
1998	2,368	+1.15%
1999	2,377	+0.38%
2000	2,368	−0.38%
2001	2,350	−0.76%
2002	2,327	−0.98%
2003	2,330	+0.13%
2004	2,295	−1.50%
2005	2,262	−1.44%
2006	2,207	−2.43%
2007	2,208	+0.05%
2008	2,156	−2.36%
2009	2,100	−2.60%
2010	2,058	−2.00%
2011	2,034	−1.17%
2012	1,987	−2.31%
2013	1,999	+0.60%
2014	2,014	+0.75%
2015	2,006	−0.40%
2016	2,031	+1.25%

== Politics ==
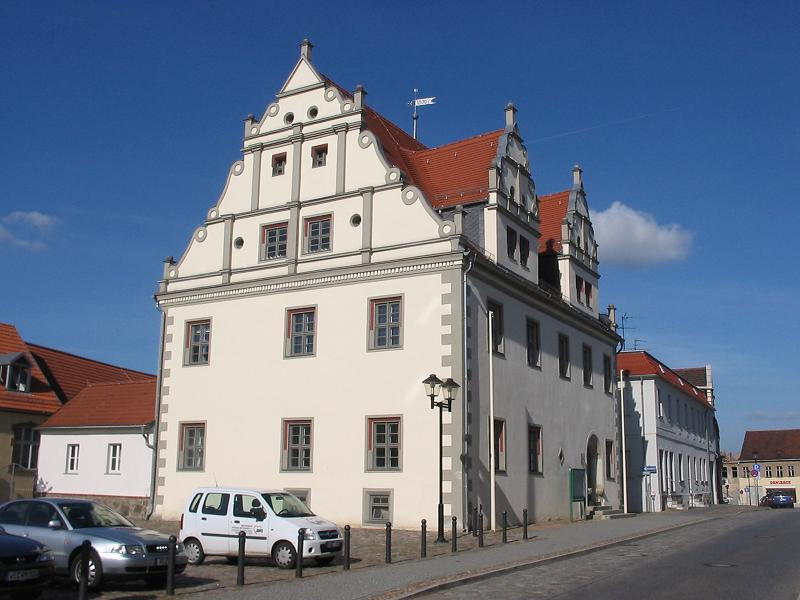
Town hall

Seats in the town's assembly (Stadtverordnetenversammlung) as of 2014 local elections:

- Zukunft Niemegk (independent): 3
- Social Democratic Party of Germany (SPD): 3
- Christian Democratic Union of Germany (CDU): 2
- Free Democratic Party (FDP): 1
- Free Voters: 1
- The Left: 1
- Individual candidate: 1

== Notable people ==
- Dieter Appelt (born 1935), photographer
