= Sculpture walk Hoher Fläming =

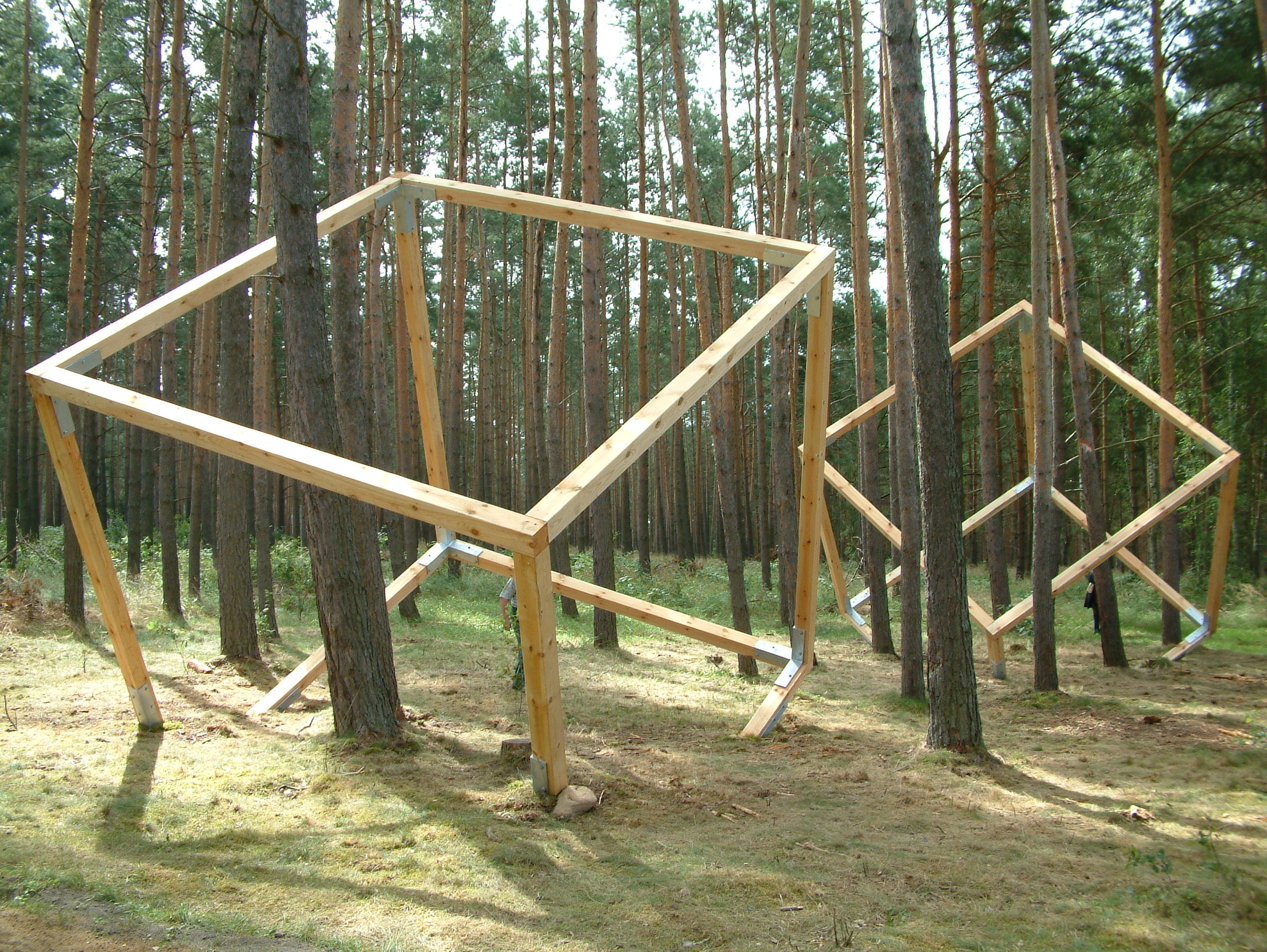
- "Under the pine trees“ by Susken Rosenthal
- Type: Sculpture walk
- Location: Upper Fläming natural park
- Nearest city: Brandenburg
- Created: 5 August 2007

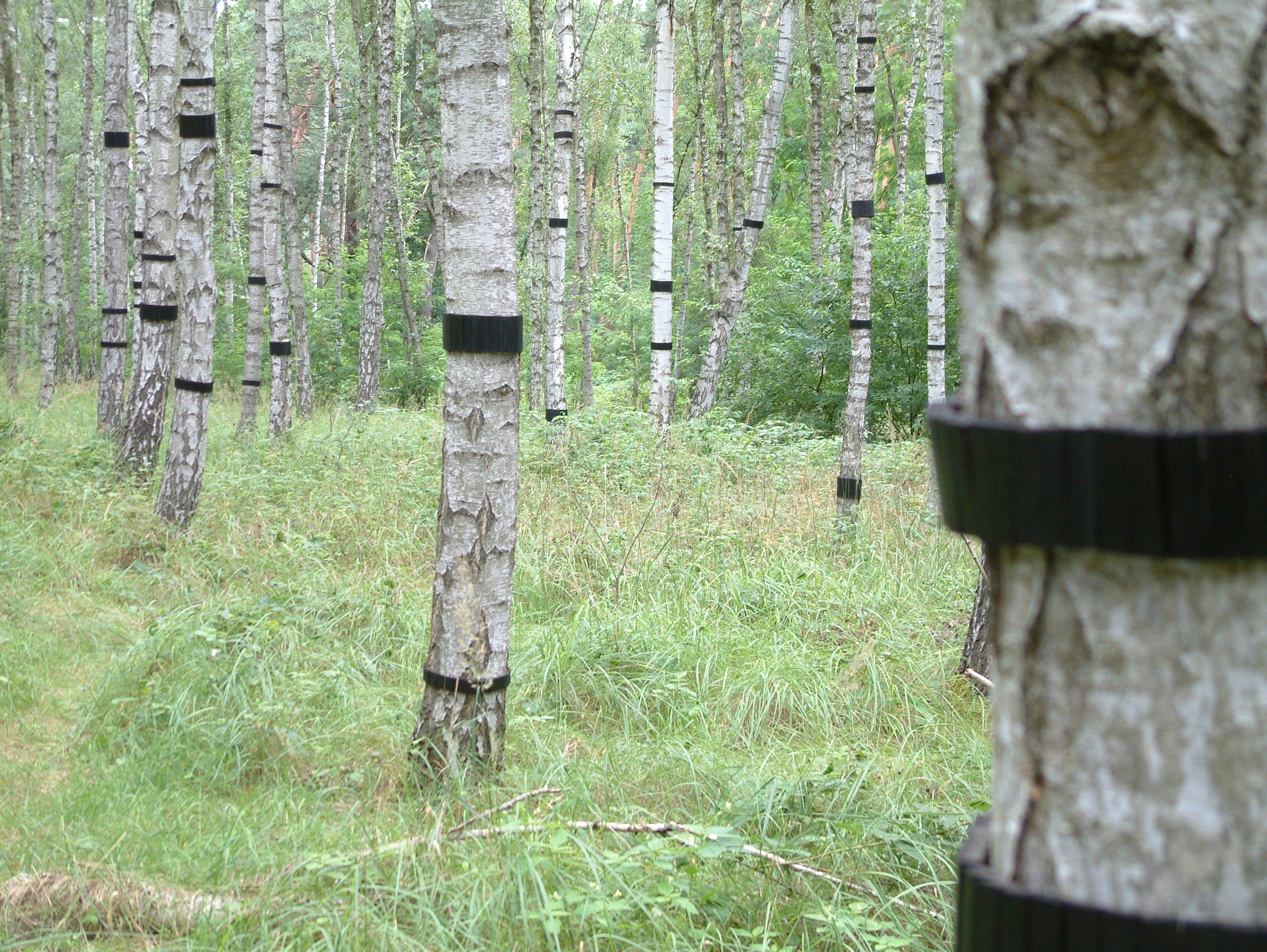
"Intermezzo" by Susanne Ruoff

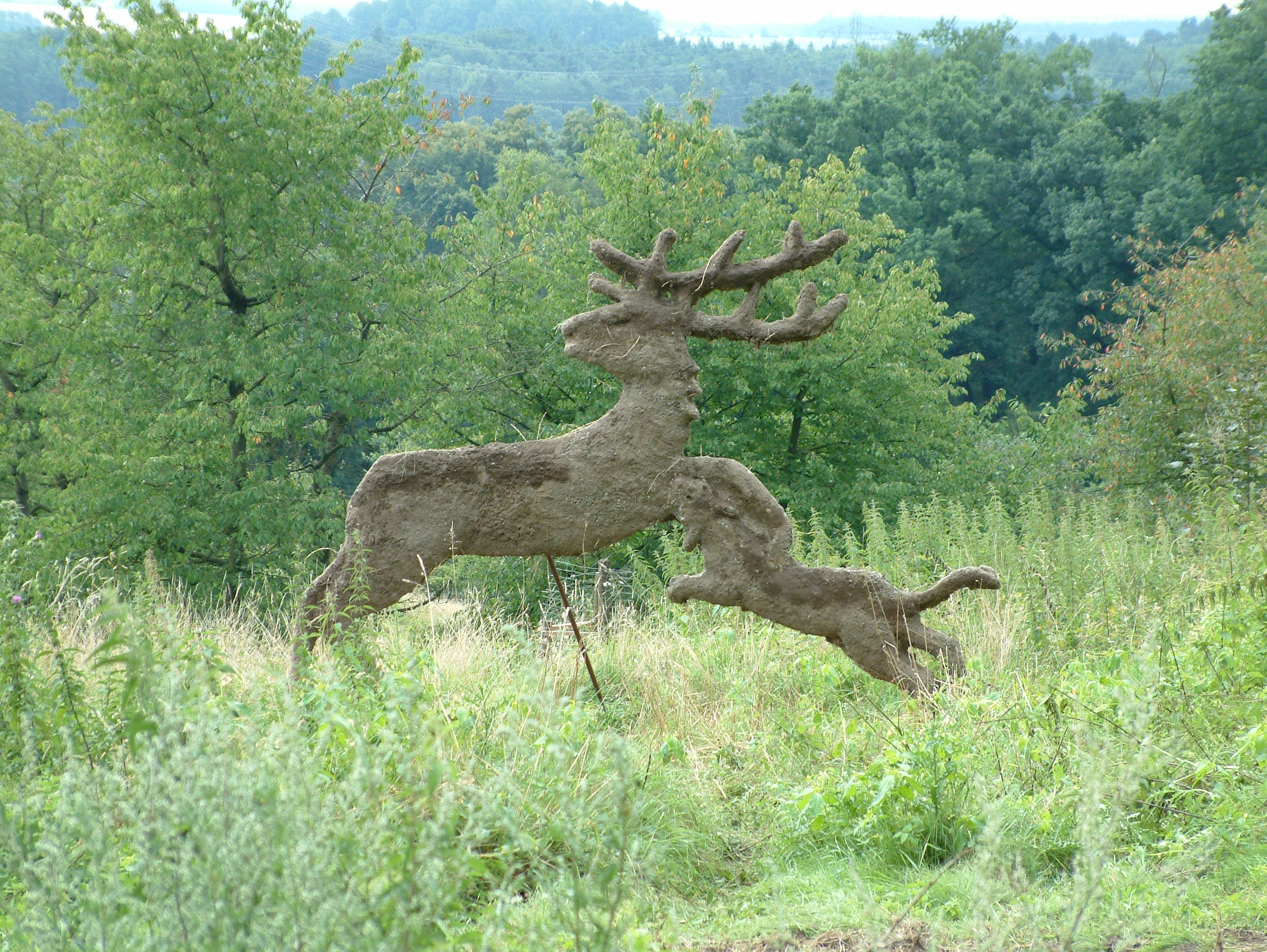
"The hunt“ by Joerg Schlinke

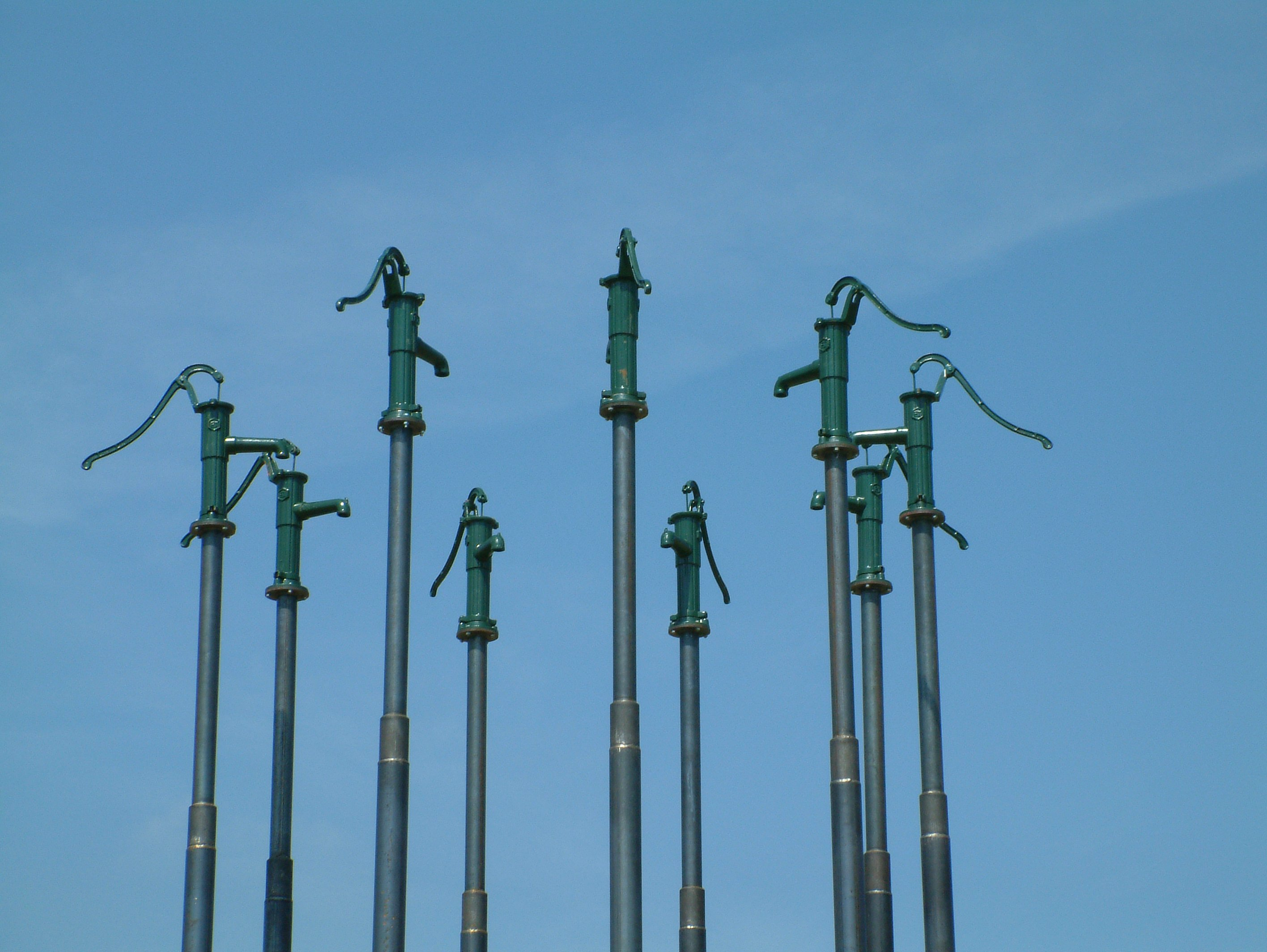
"A waterfall for Fläming" by Wolfgang Buntrock and Frank Nordiek

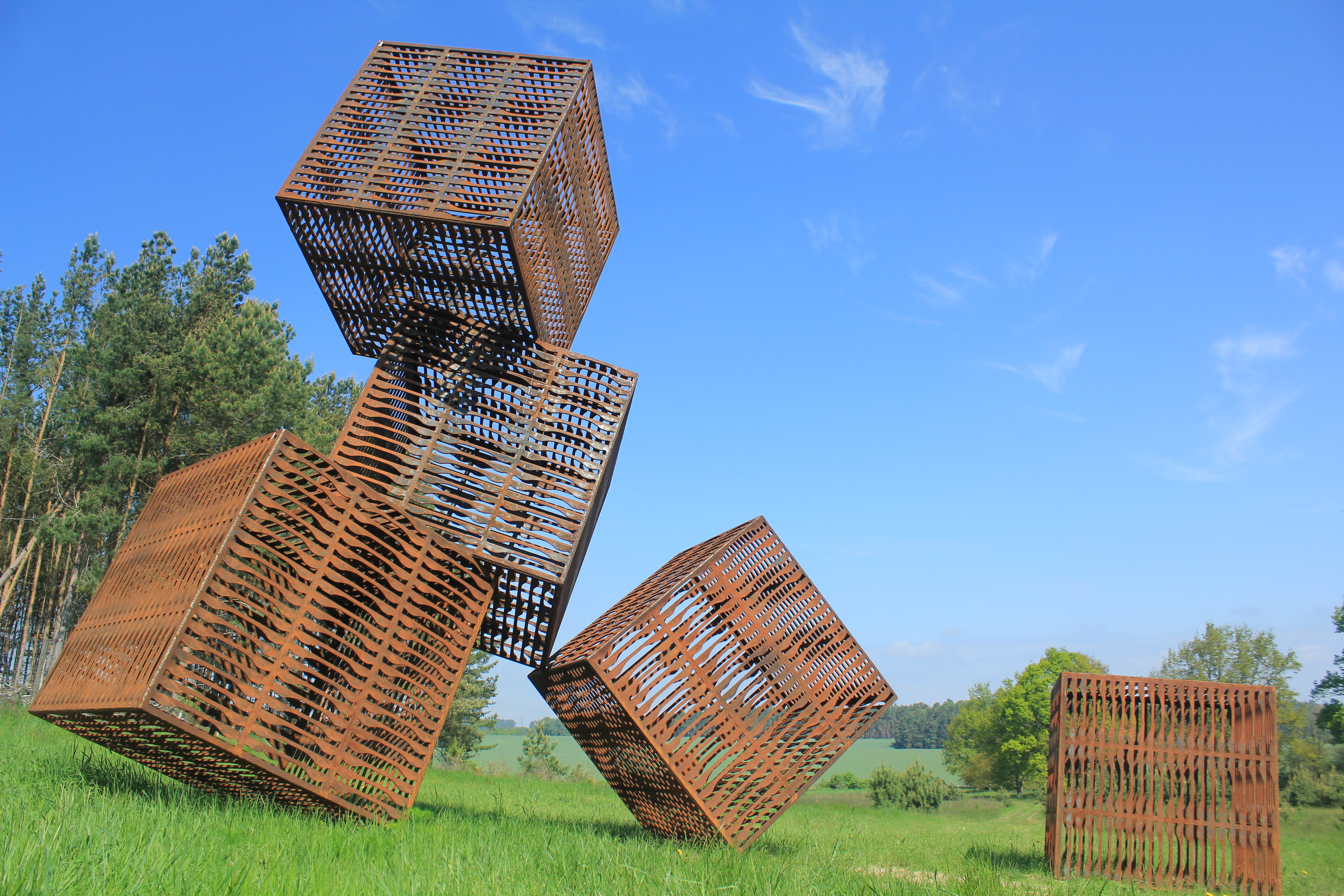
"Five cubes" by Karl Menzen

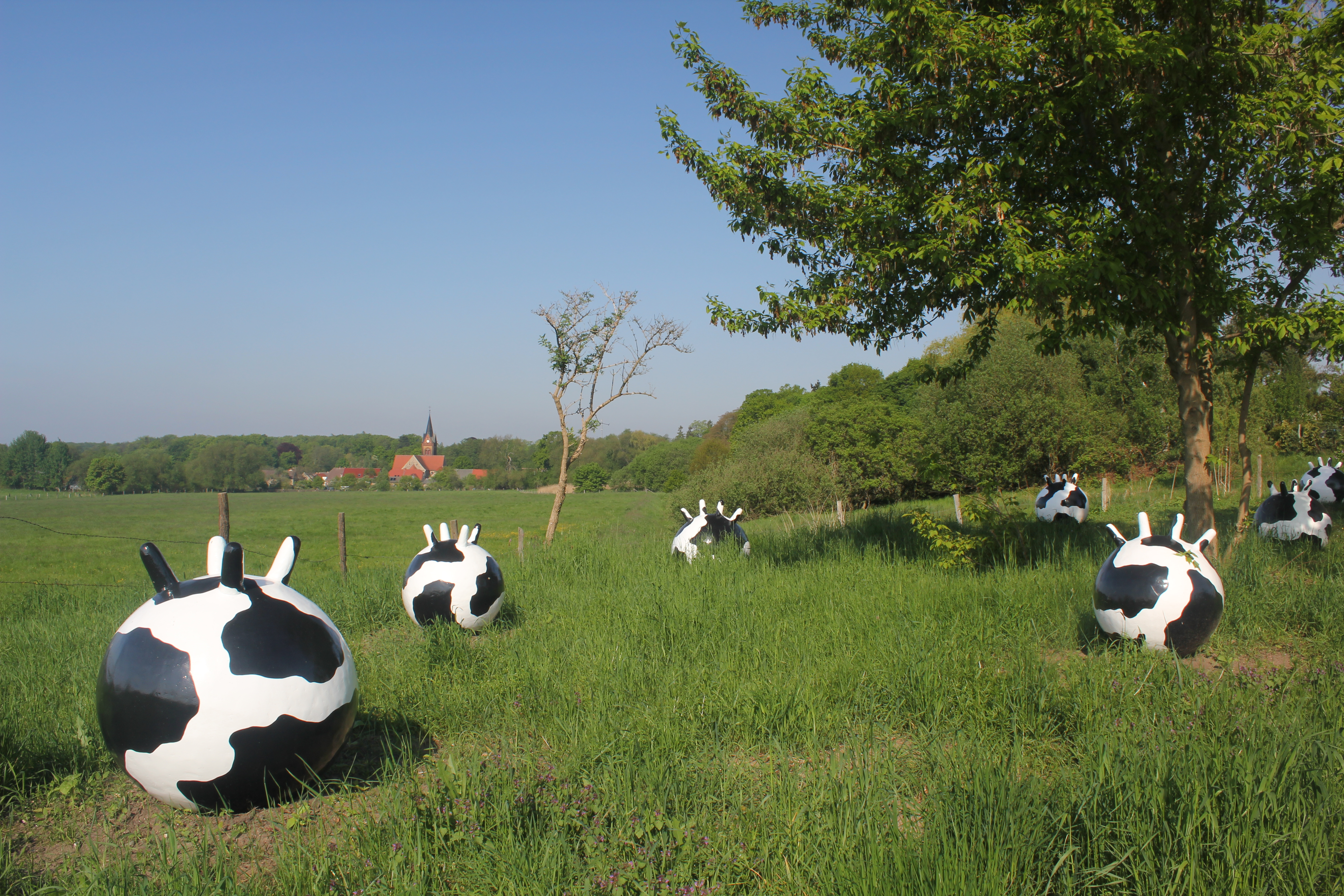
"(K)UIER(EN) - going for a walk" by Silke De Bolle

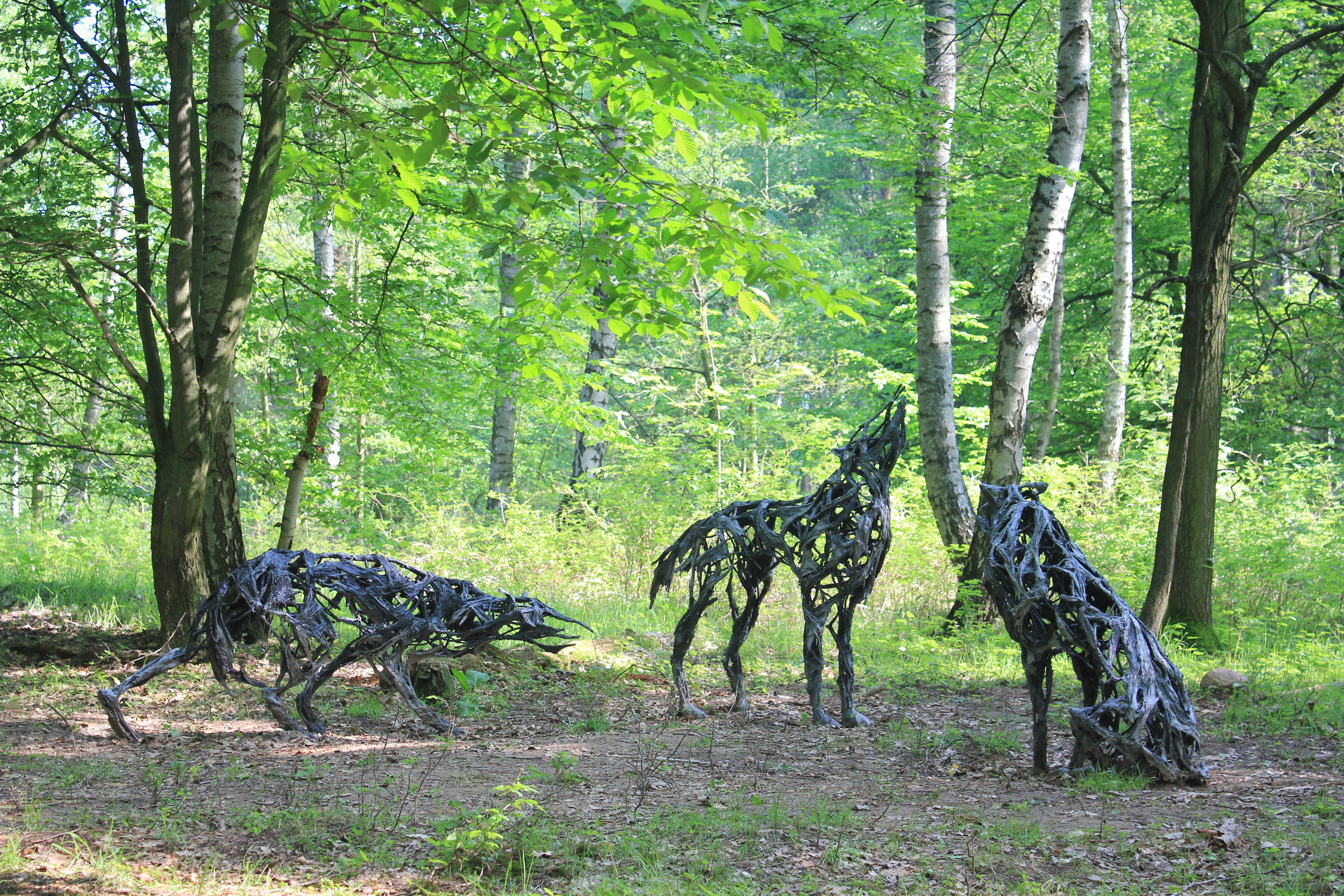
"Wolves" by Marion Burghouwt

The Kunstwanderweg Hoher Fläming (Upper Fläming sculpture walk) is a collection of sculpture walks in the Upper Fläming natural park in Brandenburg, Germany, about 100 kilometres (62 mi), or an hour's train ride south of Berlin located between the railway stations at Bad Belzig and Wiesenburg/Mark. The 17-kilometre-long (11 mi), so-called north route was opened on 5 August 2007. The 16-kilometre-long (9.9 mi) so-called south route was opened on 8 May 2010. There are plans for a variety of connecting paths. The "Naturparkverein Fläming e.V." association planned and implemented both routes. The projects were financed via the European Community LEADER programme.

== The north route ==
Ten works of art relating to the landscape have been installed along the north route. These were chosen from 114 submissions to a German federal competition by a jury chaired by Prof. Rolf Kuhn, the general manager of the Internationale Bauausstellung Fürst-Pückler-Land. An Internationale Bauausstellung (IBA) or Internationale architecture exhibition is a German political instrument for urban engineering and architecture, to show new concepts in terms of social, cultural and ecological ideas.

Position	Title	Artist
1st prize	Under the pine trees	Susken Rosenthal
1st prize	Intermezzo	Susanne Ruoff
1st prize	The hunt	Joerg Schlinke
The jury's special prize	Waterfall for Fläming	Wolfgang Buntrock and Frank Nordiek
Recognition award	Plant labyrinth	Jahna Dahms
Recognition award	Changes between points of wonder	Sebastian David
Recognition award	Unexpected encounter between two walking boots with a lot of razzmatazz	Walter Gramming and ushi f
Recognition award	Of love and the senses	Josefine Günschel and Roland Albrecht
Recognition award	Axis Mundi	Jens Kanitz
Recognition award	Glacial erratic	Hartmut Renner

== The south route ==
The competition for the south route started in January 2009. Ist subject was the Setzling of the Fläming region by the Flemish people, 850 years ago. The competition was announced both in Flanders and in Fläming. In a two-stage selection process, six works of art were chosen from Flanders and six from Fläming by a jury chaired by Prof. Rolf Kuhn.

=== Artists from Flanders ===
Position	Title	Artist
2nd	(K)UIER(EN) - going for a walk	Silke De Bolle
	Supports	Guy van Tendeloo
3rd	Wolves	Marion Burghouwt
	Line up	Johan Walraevens
	Porcelain tree	Barbara Vandecauter
	Spheres	Marie-Christine Blomme

=== Artists from Fläming ===
Position	Title	Artist
	Black stork in Fläming	Egidius Knops
	Flemish house	Birgit Cauer
	Bridge at rest	Hannes Forster
1st	Five cubes	Karl Menzen
	Picture of a garden	Jost Löber
	The columns	Ute Hoffritz

== The county of art - Upper Fläming ==
Artistic work in Upper Fläming is presented under the title of "The county of art - Upper Fläming". A project group working under the aegis of the Naturparkverein Fläming e.V. conceives artistic projects in Upper Fläming and implements them. In 2006, their first project was "Traces of art" ("Kunstspur"), a 2.5-kilometre-long (1.6 mi) walking route, presenting works of art produced by local artists. Following the implementation of the north route of the sculpture walk in 2007 and the south route in 2010, more projects are being planned.
