= Fläming Heath =

Hill range in Germany

Coordinates: 52°00′N 12°45′E

Fläming
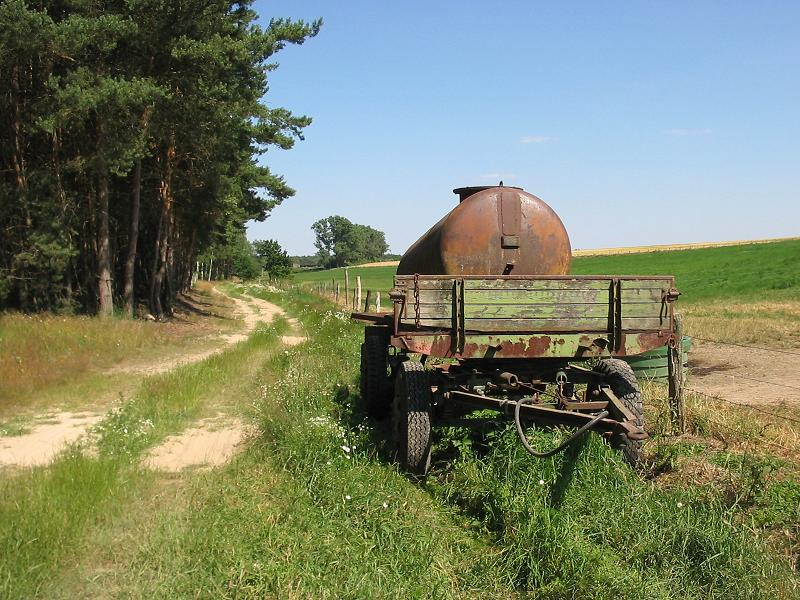
- Periglacial arroyo Steile Kieten near Belzig

Highest point
- Peak: Hagelberg
- Elevation: 659 ft (201 m)

Geography
- Country: Germany
- States: Brandenburg and Saxony-Anhalt

Geology
- Orogeny: Pleistocene
- Rock type: glacial sediment

The Fläming Heath (German pronunciation: [ˈflɛːmɪŋ]) is a region and hill chain that reaches over 100 km from the Elbe river to the Dahme River in the German states Saxony-Anhalt and Brandenburg. Its highest elevation is the Hagelberg (201 m). The name Fläming originates from the 12th century, when Flemish colonists came to settle in the region from the overcrowded cities of Flanders.

The Fläming Heath is a rural area, which benefits from its proximity to the Berlin metropolitan area. Tourism became an important economic sector. With its three nature parks (High Fläming Nature Park, Fläming Nature Park, and Nuthe-Nieplitz Nature Park), the focus is on walking, cycling and recreation in nature. Another tourist attraction is Flaeming-Skate, which is one of the longest inline-skating tracks in Europe (190 km).

The towns Ziesar, Bad Belzig, Niemegk, Treuenbrietzen, Jüterbog, Baruth/Mark, Dahme/Mark, Wittenberg, Loburg, Möckern, and Zerbst, as well as the municipalities Wiesenburg (Mark) and Rabenstein/Fläming, are situated in or at the border of the Fläming Heath.
