= Holzner =

Holzner is a surname. Notable people with the surname include:

- Claudia Holzner (born 1994), Canadian synchronized swimmer
- Felix Holzner (born 1985), German footballer
- Hanni Hölzner (1913–1988), German swimmer
- Ulrike Holzner (born 1968), German bobsledder
