= Ravenstein (surname) =

Ravenstein or von Ravenstein is a German language habitational surname. Notable people with the name include:

- Apollonia van Ravenstein (1954), Dutch retired model and actress
- Ernst Georg Ravenstein (1834–1913), German-English geographer and cartographer
- Johann von Ravenstein (1889–1962), German general (generalleutnant) in the Wehrmacht

== See also ==
- Rabenstein
