= Niemegk (Amt) =

- Amt
- Map of Potsdam-Mittelmark highlighting Niemegk
- Interactive map of Niemegk
- Location within Germany Location within Brandenburg
- Coordinates: 52°04′N 12°41′E
- Country: Germany
- State: Brandenburg
- District: Potsdam-Mittelmark
- Seat: Niemegk
- Subdivisions: 4 municipalities

Area
  - Total: 225.77 km^{2} (87.17 sq mi)

Population (2025-12-31)
  - Total: 4,597
  - Density: 20.36/km^{2} (52.74/sq mi)
- Time zone: UTC+01:00 (CET)
  - Summer (DST): UTC+02:00 (CEST)
- Website: www.amt-niemegk.de

Amt Niemegk is an Amt ("collective municipality") in the district of Potsdam-Mittelmark, in Brandenburg, Germany. Its seat is in Niemegk.

The Amt Niemegk consists of the following municipalities:

1. Mühlenfließ
2. Niemegk
3. Planetal
4. Rabenstein

== Demography ==
Development of population since 1875 within the current Boundaries (Blue Line: Population; Dotted Line: Comparison to Population development in Brandenburg state; Grey Background: Time of Nazi Germany; Red Background: Time of communist East Germany)

Recent Population Development and Projections (Population Development before Census 2011 (blue line); Recent Population Development according to the Census in Germany in 2011 (blue bordered line); Official projections for 2005-2030 (yellow line); for 2017-2030 (scarlet line); for 2020-2030 (green line)

Amt Niemegk: Population development
within the current boundaries (2020)

| Year | Pop. | ±% p.a. |
|---|---|---|
| 1875 | 6,665 | — |
| 1890 | 6,608 | −0.06% |
| 1910 | 7,077 | +0.34% |
| 1925 | 6,881 | −0.19% |
| 1939 | 7,162 | +0.29% |
| 1950 | 9,220 | +2.32% |
| 1964 | 7,333 | −1.62% |
| 1971 | 7,109 | −0.44% |
| 1981 | 6,277 | −1.24% |

| Year | Pop. | ±% p.a. |
|---|---|---|
| 1985 | 6,139 | −0.55% |
| 1990 | 5,900 | −0.79% |
| 1995 | 5,593 | −1.06% |
| 2000 | 5,489 | −0.37% |
| 2005 | 5,213 | −1.03% |
| 2010 | 4,851 | −1.43% |
| 2015 | 4,706 | −0.61% |
| 2020 | 4,617 | −0.38% |
| 2025 | 4,597 | −0.09% |
