= Fläming Nature Park =

Nature park in Saxony-Anhalt, Germany

Coordinates: 52°00′04″N 12°16′43″E

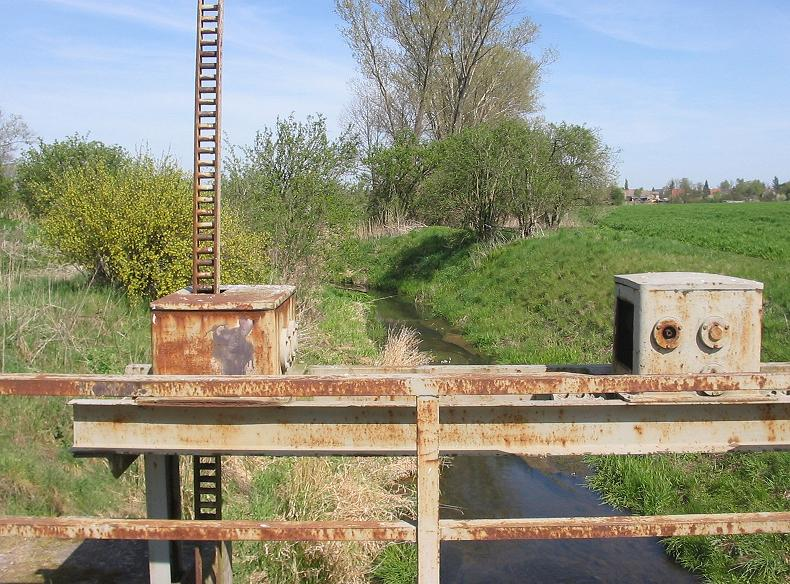
Stream Zahna nearby the town Zahna

The Fläming Nature Park (German: Naturpark Fläming) is a nature park with 824 km^{2} in Saxony-Anhalt, Germany, opened in 2005. It is one of six nature parks in the state Saxony-Anhalt.

The park borders in the north to the High Fläming Nature Park (German: „Naturpark Hoher Fläming“) in the state Brandenburg and in the south to the biosphere reserve Mittelelbe at the river Elbe. The nature of the park is determined by the low mountain range Fläming (max. ~ 200 m high) with forests, meadows, small clear streams and agricultural land. Culturally interesting are some historic towns, old villages, castles and mediaeval stone churches.

The central park office and visitor centre is situated in Jeber-Bergfrieden. The parts of the area belong to the districts Anhalt-Zerbst and Wittenberg and with a small part also to the town Coswig. The park contains 6 towns and 38 municipalities or parts of them; the towns are Coswig, Lindau, Roßlau, Zerbst, Wittenberg and Zahna.
