= Mühlenfließ =

- Municipality
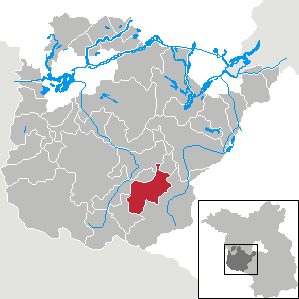
- Location of Mühlenfließ within Potsdam-Mittelmark district
- Interactive map of Mühlenfließ
- Location within Germany Location within Brandenburg
- Coordinates: 52°07′00″N 12°46′59″E
- Country: Germany
- State: Brandenburg
- District: Potsdam-Mittelmark
- Municipal assoc.: Niemegk
- Subdivisions: 4 Ortsteile

Government
  - Mayor (2024–29): Jens Hinze

Area
  - Total: 58.22 km^{2} (22.48 sq mi)
- Elevation: 60 m (200 ft)

Population (2025-12-31)
  - Total: 911
  - Density: 15.6/km^{2} (40.5/sq mi)
- Time zone: UTC+01:00 (CET)
  - Summer (DST): UTC+02:00 (CEST)
- Postal codes: 14823
- Dialling codes: 033843
- Vehicle registration: PM
- Website: www.amt-niemegk.de

Mühlenfließ is a municipality in the Potsdam-Mittelmark district, in Brandenburg, Germany.

== Demography ==
Development of population since 1875 within the current Boundaries (Blue Line: Population; Dotted Line: Comparison to Population development in Brandenburg state; Grey Background: Time of Nazi Germany; Red Background: Time of communist East Germany)

Mühlenfließ: Population development
within the current boundaries (2013)

Year	Pop.	±% p.a.
1875	1,448	—
1890	1,525	+0.35%
1910	1,458	−0.22%
1925	1,434	−0.11%
1933	1,412	−0.19%
1939	1,333	−0.95%
1946	1,846	+4.76%
1950	1,811	−0.48%
1964	1,376	−1.94%
1971	1,295	−0.86%
1981	1,138	−1.28%
1985	1,109	−0.64%
1989	1,078	−0.71%
1990	1,063	−1.39%
1991	1,054	−0.85%
1992	1,052	−0.19%
1993	1,052	+0.00%
1994	1,046	−0.57%
1995	1,024	−2.10%
1996	1,019	−0.49%

Year	Pop.	±% p.a.
1997	1,029	+0.98%
1998	1,043	+1.36%
1999	1,031	−1.15%
2000	1,024	−0.68%
2001	1,001	−2.25%
2002	999	−0.20%
2003	987	−1.20%
2004	978	−0.91%
2005	959	−1.94%
2006	980	+2.19%
2007	962	−1.84%
2008	946	−1.66%
2009	945	−0.11%
2010	950	+0.53%
2011	917	−3.47%
2012	909	−0.87%
2013	899	−1.10%
2014	904	+0.56%
2015	921	+1.88%
2016	904	−1.85%
