= Bad Belzig =

Place in Brandenburg, Germany

- Town
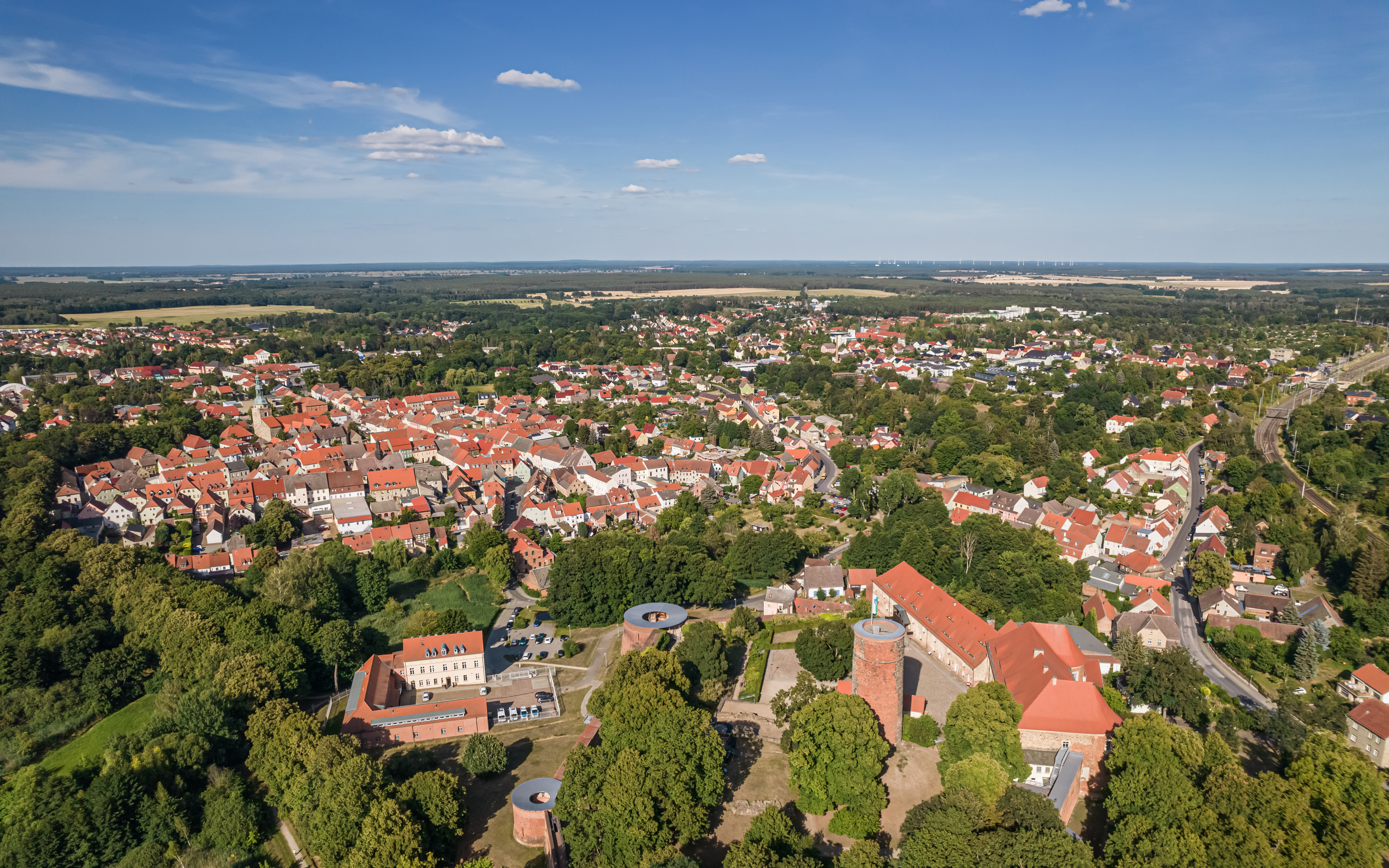
- Old Town with Eisenhardt Castle

- Coat of arms

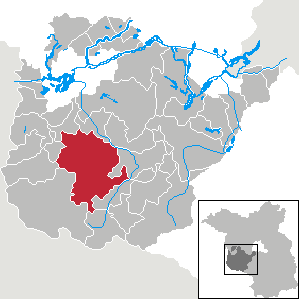
- Location of Bad Belzig within Potsdam-Mittelmark district
- Interactive map of Bad Belzig
- Location within Germany Location within Brandenburg
- Coordinates: 52°08′32″N 12°35′44″E
- Country: Germany
- State: Brandenburg
- District: Potsdam-Mittelmark
- Subdivisions: 4 Stadtteile & 14 Ortsteile

Government
  - Mayor (2023–31): Robert Pulz

Area
  - Total: 236.07 km^{2} (91.15 sq mi)
- Elevation: 88 m (289 ft)

Population (2025-12-31)
  - Total: 11,109
  - Density: 47.058/km^{2} (121.88/sq mi)
- Time zone: UTC+01:00 (CET)
  - Summer (DST): UTC+02:00 (CEST)
- Postal codes: 14806
- Dialling codes: 033841
- Vehicle registration: PM
- Website: Bad-Belzig.de

Bad Belzig (German pronunciation: [baːt ˈbɛltsɪç]), until 2010 Belzig, is a historic town in Brandenburg, Germany located about 70 km (43 mi) southwest of Berlin. It is the capital of the Potsdam-Mittelmark district.

== Geography ==
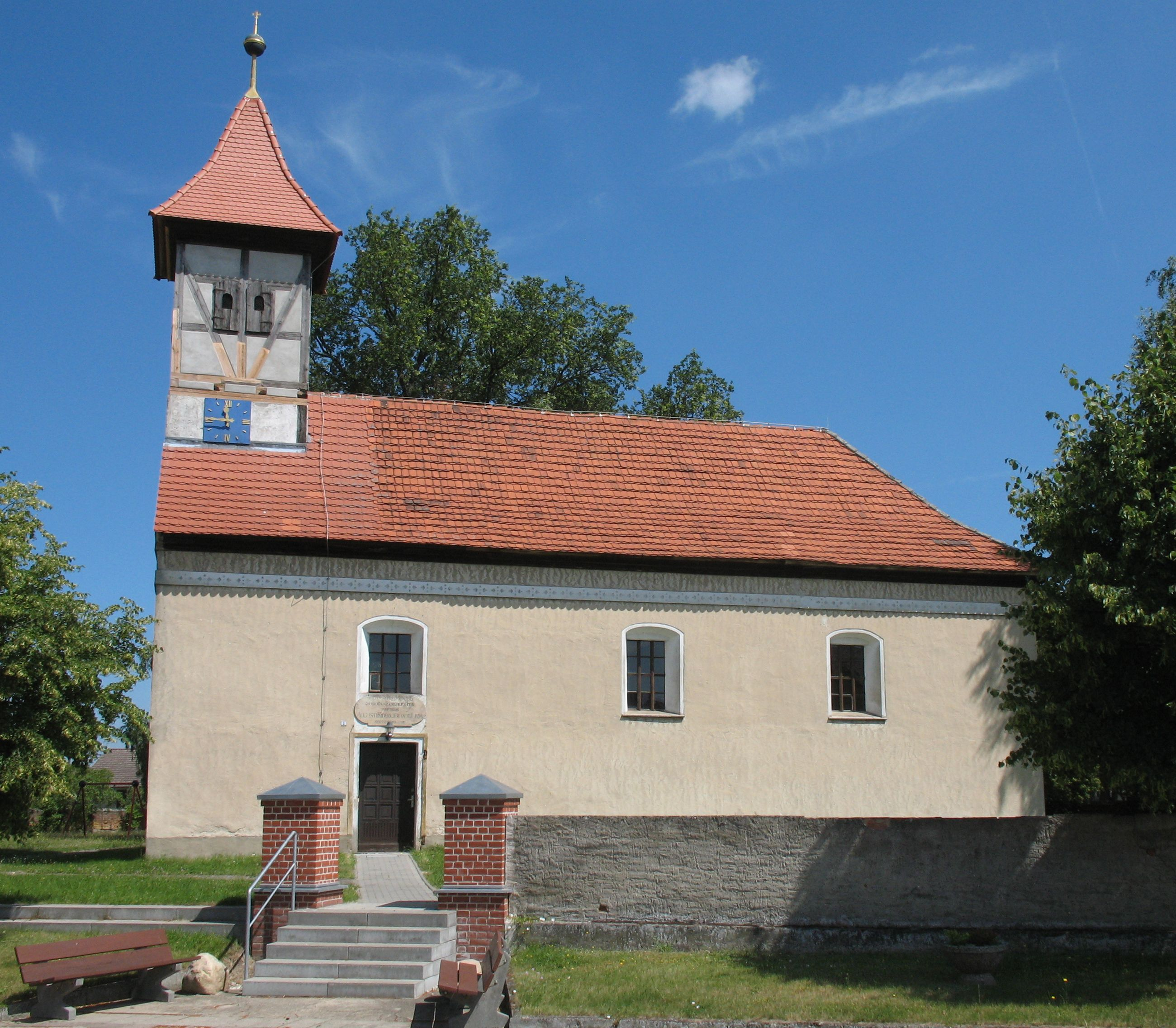
Church in Groß Briesen

Bad Belzig is located within the Fläming hill range and in the centre of the High Fläming Nature Park. The plains north of the town are home to one of the few great bustard populations in Germany.

Since 2003, when 14 surrounding villages were incorporated into Bad Belzig, some of them voluntarily, others by Brandenburg Landtag (state parliament) legislation, Bad Belzig has an area of 234.83 km^{2}. These villages became districts (Ortsteile) of Belzig:

- Bergholz
- Borne
- Dippmannsdorf
- Fredersdorf
- Groß Briesen
- Hagelberg
- Kuhlowitz
- Lübnitz
- Lüsse
- Lütte
- Neschholz
- Ragösen
- Schwanebeck
- Werbig

The forest of Verlorenwasser near Werbig encompassed the geographical centre of East Germany.

== History ==
A Slavic fort of Belizi was first mentioned in a 997 deed issued by Emperor Otto III in favour of the Archbishopric of Magdeburg. Whether this denotation refers to Bad Belzig or the neighbouring town of Beelitz has not been conclusively established. Nevertheless, both towns celebrated their 1000 years anniversary in 1997.

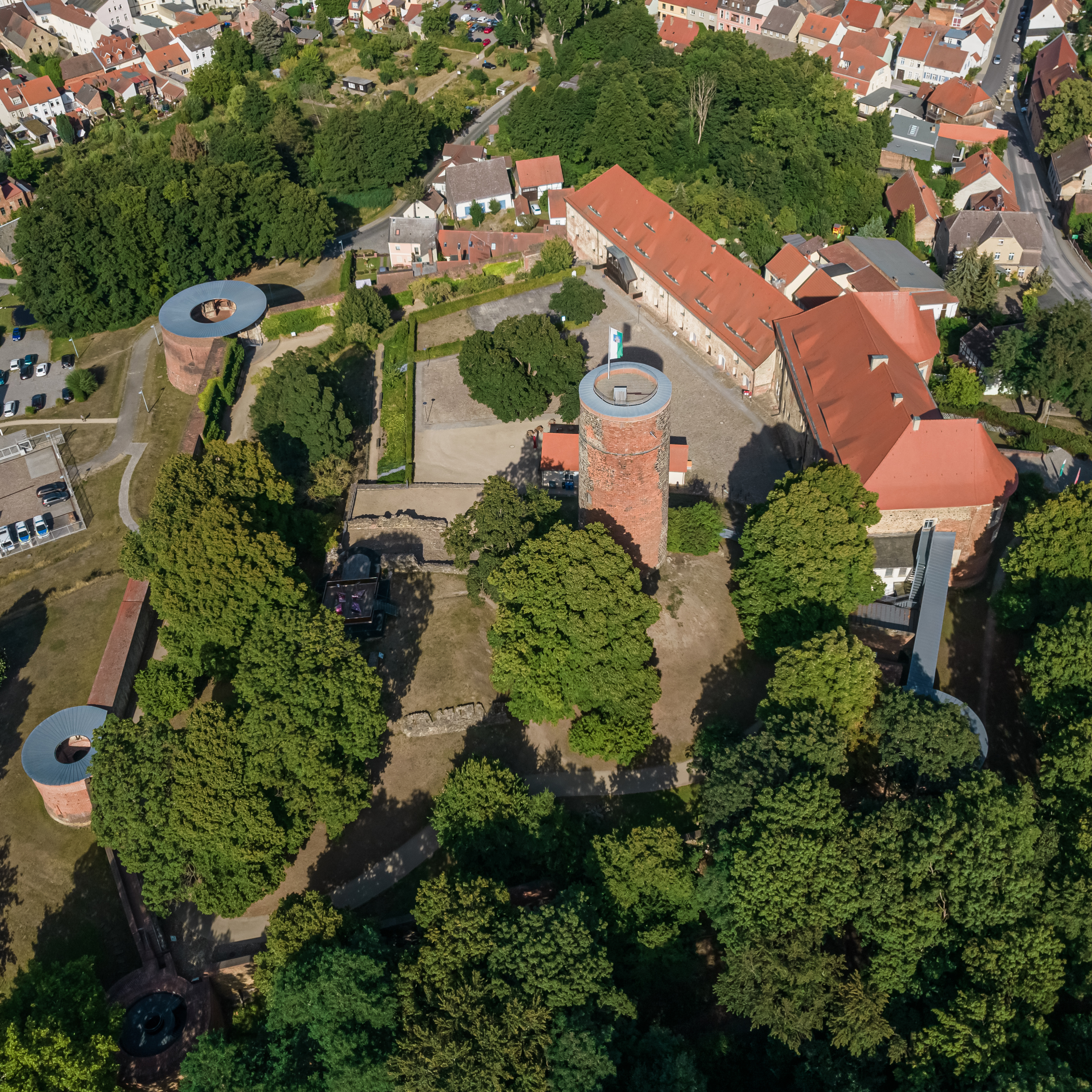
Eisenhardt Castle

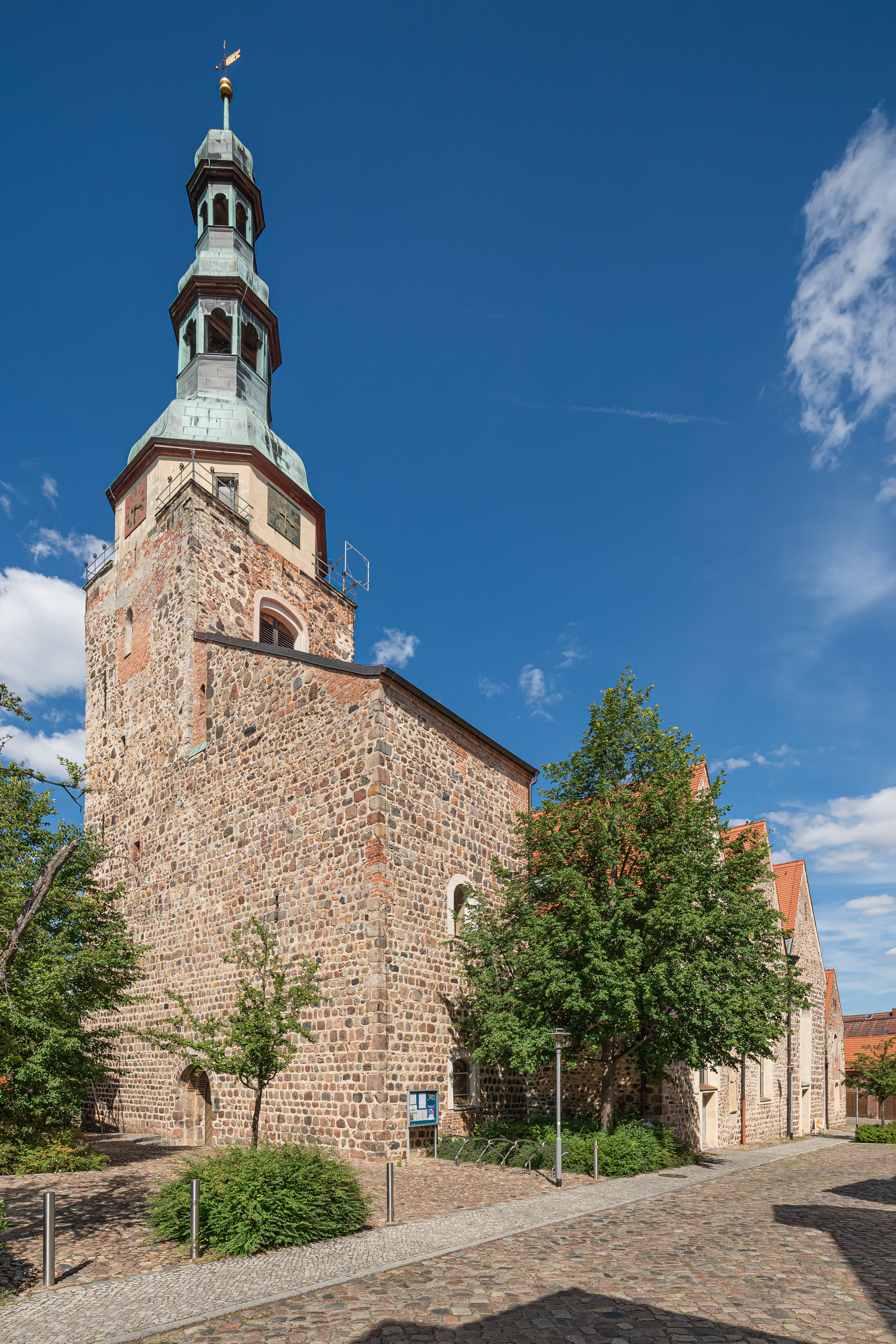
St Mary's Church

The estates however had actually already been lost in the Slavic uprising of 983 and were not conquered again until 1153 by Albert the Bear from the House of Ascania. In 1251 the castle (Burg Eisenhardt) and the adjacent settlement became part of Saxe-Wittenberg under Albert's successor Duke Albert I. However it was claimed by the archbishops of Magdeburg, whose forces devastated Belzig in 1406. The rebuilt castle was again seized by the Hussite general Prokop the Great when he invaded Saxony in 1429, after which Elector Ernest of Saxony from the House of Wettin enlarged it to a fortress. During the Thirty Years' War it was seized by the troops of the Swedish Empire in 1636, after Elector John George I had allied with Emperor Ferdinand II in the Peace of Prague.

The Romanesque St Mary's Church was built in the late 13th century. According to an inscription in the keystone of the western entrance, Martin Luther preached here on January 14, 1530. Bad Belzig was granted town privileges in 1702. During the War of the Sixth Coalition on August 27, 1813, troops of the French Empire and Saxony were attacked by Prussian and Russian forces near the village of Hagelberg. The encounter ended in a French defeat, while several Saxon units went over to the Prussians. According to the Final Act of the 1815 Congress of Vienna Bad Belzig was ceded to Prussia and became part of the Province of Brandenburg, after having belonged to the Saxon Electorate for centuries.

In 1934, ammunition works were established in Bad Belzig, including a labor camp with about 1500 forced laborers. During the years 1936–1945, Burg Eisenhardt was the site of the Reichsschule (leadership school) for the Technischen Nothilfe ('technical emergency relief'.) The Technische Nothilfe was abolished in May, 1945, but the idea was revived by Otto Lummitzsch in the form of the Technisches Hilfswerk in 1950, which exists to this day as one of the pillars of the German civil protection infrastructure. Between 1940 and 1945 a subcamp of the women's concentration camp Ravensbrück with about 750 inmates was also located nearby. Bad Belzig was also the site of a large radio transmitter station, erected in 1939. In 1952 the town became the capital of the Belzig district and in 1993 of the newly created district of Potsdam-Mittelmark. In 1995 Bad Belzig was awarded the official title of a climatic health resort. Effective March 2010, the town's name was changed to "Bad Belzig".

=== Demography ===
Development of population since 1875 within the current Boundaries: Blue line: Population. Dotted line: Comparison to population development in Brandenburg state. Grey background: Time of Nazi Germany. Red rackground: Time of communist East Germany

Recent population development and projections: Population development before Census 2011 (blue line); recent population development according to the Census in Germany in 2011 (blue bordered line); official projections for 2005-2030 (yellow line); for 2017-2030 (scarlet line); for 2020-2030 (green line)

Bad Belzig: Population development
within the current boundaries (2020)

Year	Pop.	±% p.a.
1875	8,847	—
1890	8,665	−0.14%
1910	9,162	+0.28%
1925	9,362	+0.14%
1939	10,636	+0.92%
1950	14,139	+2.62%
1964	12,329	−0.97%

Year	Pop.	±% p.a.
1971	12,145	−0.21%
1981	11,873	−0.23%
1985	11,849	−0.05%
1990	11,960	+0.19%
1995	11,711	−0.42%
2000	12,263	+0.93%
2005	11,772	−0.81%

Year	Pop.	±% p.a.
2010	11,248	−0.91%
2015	11,120	−0.23%
2016	11,113	−0.06%
2017	11,126	+0.12%
2018	11,144	+0.16%
2019	11,141	−0.03%
2020	11,096	−0.40%

== Politics ==
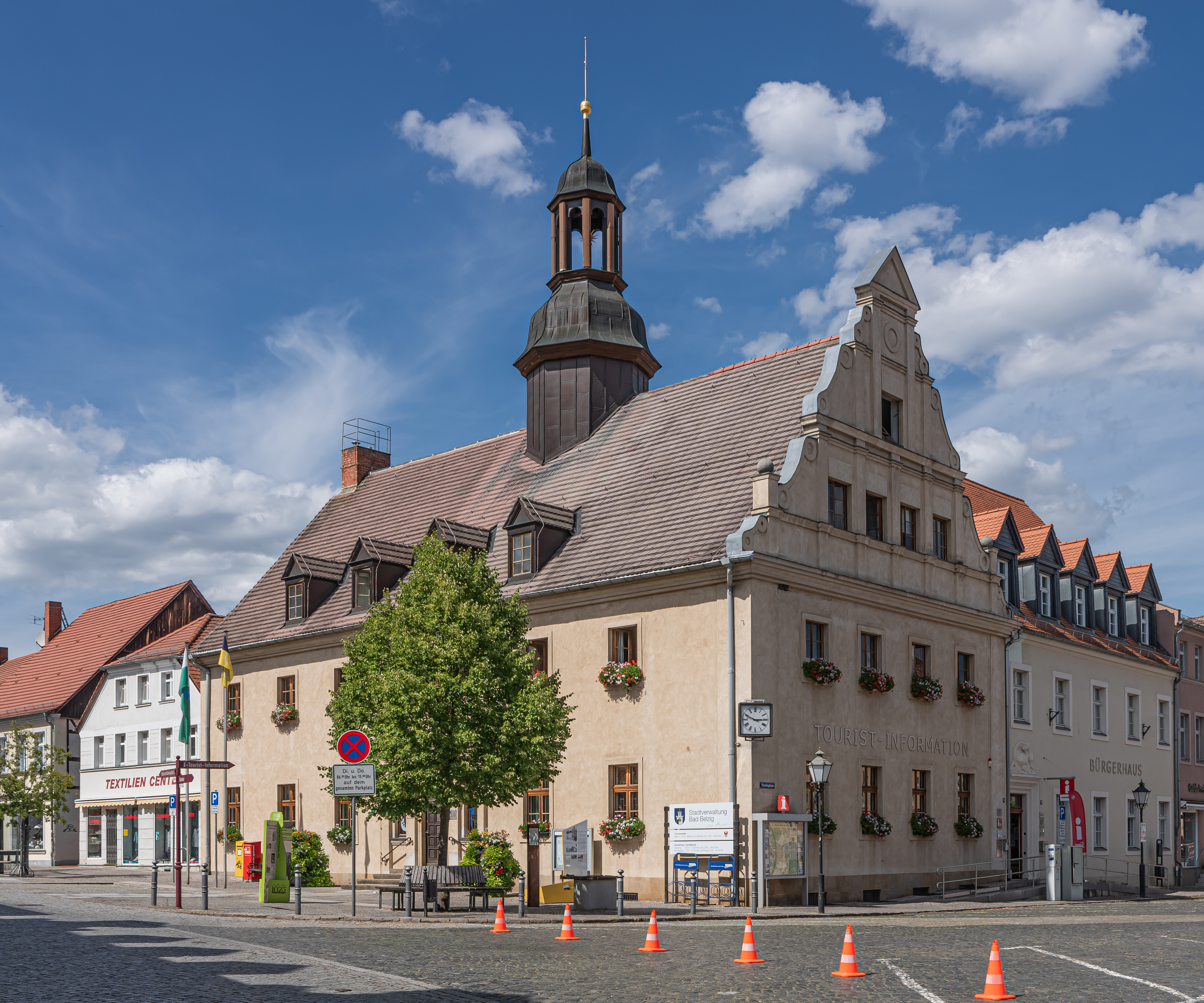
Town hall

== Mayors ==
- 1990–2008: Peter Kiep (SPD)
- 2008–2016: Hannelore Klabunde-Quast (independent)
- since 1. Dezember 2016: Roland Leisegang (independent)

Peter Kiep could work in office only till 2006. He died in 2013.

Hannelore Klabunde-Quast became in 2006 the substitute of Peter Kiep. She was elected mayor in 2008.

Roland Leisegang (a founding member of the band Keimzeit) was elected mayor in 2016 with 65,4 % of the votes.

The municipal assembly (Stadtverordnetenversammlung) has 22 members. The 2014 elections showed the following results:

- Social Democrats (SPD): 6 seats
- Left Party (Die Linke): 3 seats
- Christian Democrats (CDU): 3 seats
- "We, the villagers" group: 3 seats
- Free Voters: 2 seats
- Grüne: 2 seats
- Liberals (FDP): 1 seat
- NPD: 1 seat
- Belzig Business Association: 1 seat

The town's shield depicts the coat of arms of Saxony due to the long-time affiliation with the Saxon Electorate.

== International relations ==
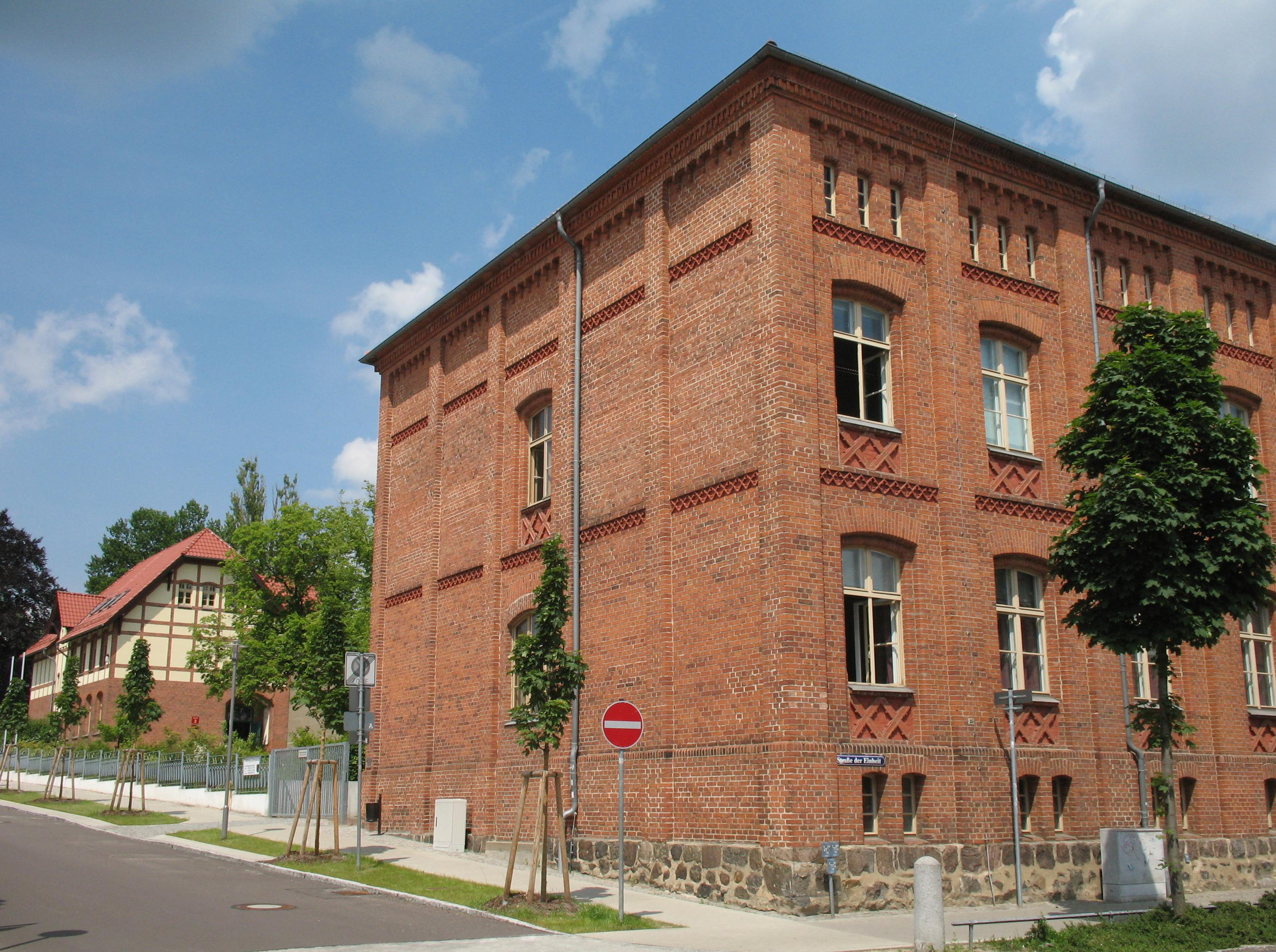
School buildings

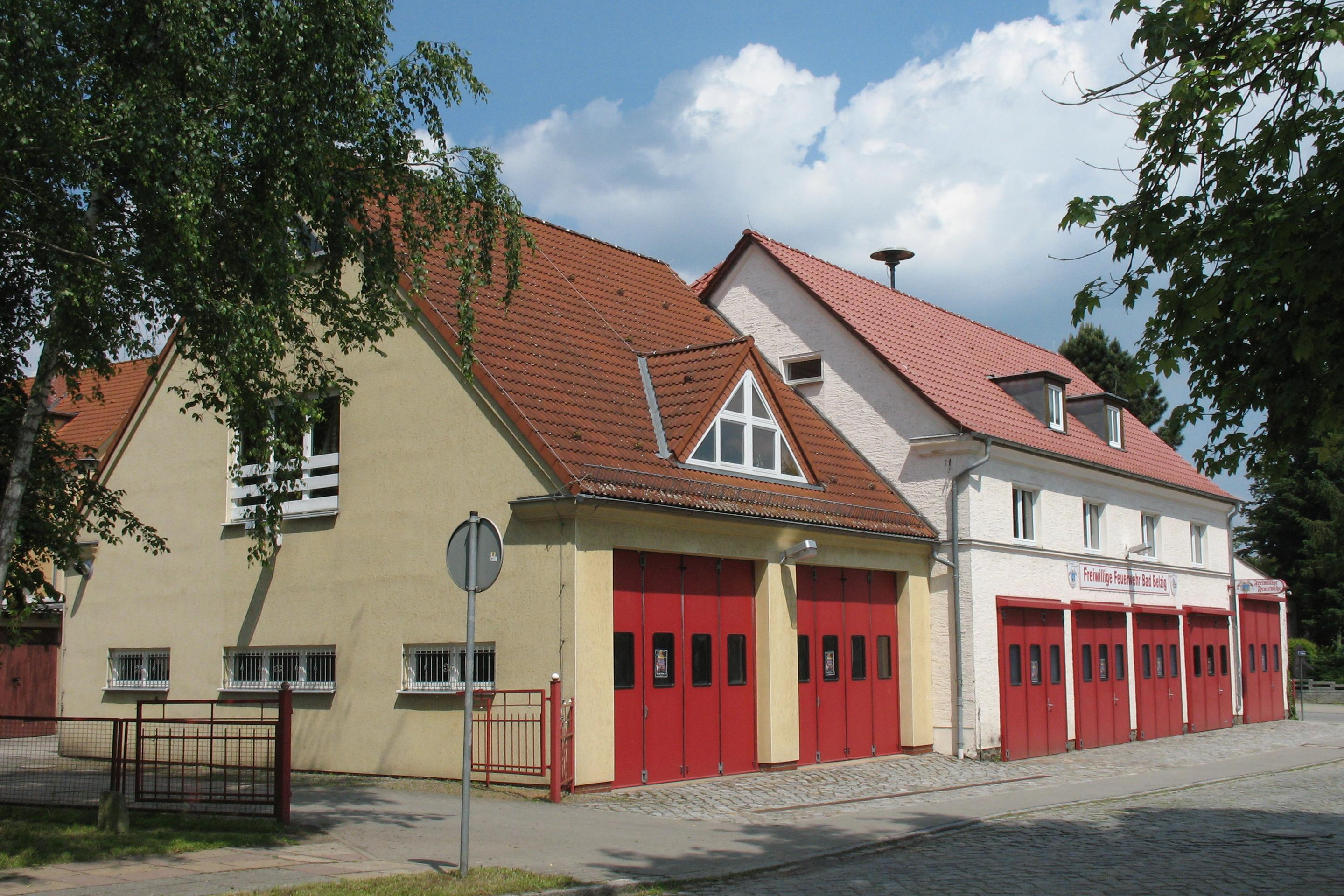
Fire station

Bad Belzig is twinned with Ritterhude, a town in the German state of Lower Saxony, and is also twinned with Workington, a town in Cumbria, England.

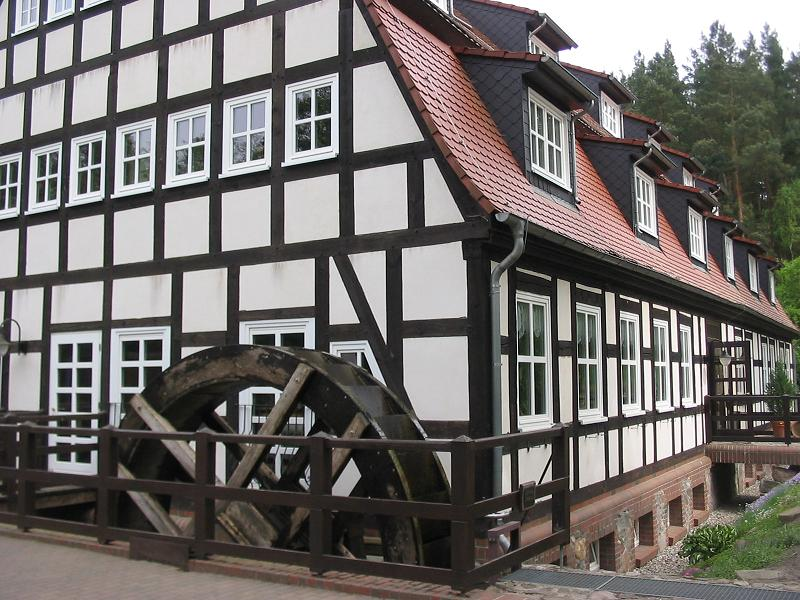
Watermill Springbachmühle, reconstructed

Bad Belzig exchanges students with Even Yehuda, Israel. Yet, there is not official agreement between the cities.

== Places of interest ==
Main attractions are medieval Eisenhardt castle and the thermal bath SteinTherme. There is also a picturesque historic town centre with the town hall and the market place in the middle.

Places of interest in the incorporated villages include Glien Manor (Klein Glien) in Hagelberg and the windmill in Borne.

There is also a set of sculpture walks starting from Bad Belzig, heading towards Wiesenburg.

== Economy ==
The district administration is the major employer in Bad Belzig.

Bad Belzig is the main town in the rural Higher Fläming area, with schools, shops, supermarkets, a hospital and a cinema all used by the inhabitants of surrounding towns and villages.

There is a successful rehabilitation clinic (sanatorium) in Bad Belzig.

In 1989, Bad Belzig launched an ambitious programme to become a spa town (achieving recognition in 2009) and promote tourism.

== Sons and daughters of the town ==
- Carl Gottlieb Reißiger (1798–1859), composer and Kapellmeister in Dresden
- Matthias Rudolph (born 1982), football coach and player
- Felix Holzner (born 1985), football player
- Fabian Wiede (born 1994), handball player
