= Felix Holzner =

German footballer

Personal information
- Date of birth: 4 June 1985 (age 41)
- Place of birth: Belzig, East Germany
- Height: 1.73 m (5 ft 8 in)
- Position: Midfielder

Youth career
- 1991–2005: FC Carl Zeiss Jena

Senior career*
Years	Team	Apps	(Gls)
2004–2011	FC Carl Zeiss Jena II	28	(1)
2005–2011	FC Carl Zeiss Jena	65	(1)
- * Club domestic league appearances and goals

Felix Holzner (born 4 June 1985 in Belzig, Bezirk Potsdam) is a German former football midfielder who played for FC Carl Zeiss Jena.
