= Wiesenburg =

- Municipality
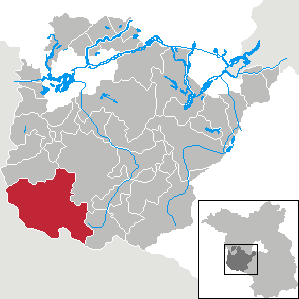
- Location of Wiesenburg within Potsdam-Mittelmark district
- Interactive map of Wiesenburg
- Location within Germany Location within Brandenburg
- Coordinates: 52°07′N 12°27′E
- Country: Germany
- State: Brandenburg
- District: Potsdam-Mittelmark

Government
  - Mayor (2022–30): Marco Beckendorf (Left)

Area
  - Total: 218.20 km^{2} (84.25 sq mi)
- Elevation: 167 m (548 ft)

Population (2025-12-31)
  - Total: 4,233
  - Density: 19.40/km^{2} (50.24/sq mi)
- Time zone: UTC+01:00 (CET)
  - Summer (DST): UTC+02:00 (CEST)
- Postal codes: 14827
- Dialling codes: 033849
- Vehicle registration: PM
- Website: www.wiesenburgmark.de

Wiesenburg (official name: Wiesenburg/Mark) is a municipality in the Potsdam-Mittelmark district, in Brandenburg, Germany. It is situated 10 km west of Bad Belzig, and 34 km southwest of Brandenburg. It is located in the High Fläming Nature Park.

== Geography ==
Since 2000, when 14 surrounding villages voluntarily merged to form the free municipality Wiesenburg/Mark, it has had an area of 218.19 km^{2}.

These villages became districts (Ortsteile) of Wiesenburg/Mark:

- Benken
- Grubo
- Jeserig/Fläming
- Jeserigerhütten
- Kelpzig
- Lehnsdorf
- Medewitz
- Mützdorf
- Neuehütten
- Reetz
- Reetzerhütten
- Reppinichen
- Schlamau
- Wiesenburg

== Demography ==
Development of population since 1875 within the current Boundaries (Blue Line: Population; Dotted Line: Comparison to Population development in Brandenburg state; Grey Background: Time of Nazi Germany; Red Background: Time of communist East Germany)

Recent Population Development and Projections (Population Development before Census 2011 (blue line); Recent Population Development according to the Census in Germany in 2011 (blue bordered line); Official projections for 2005-2030 (yellow line); for 2017-2030 (scarlet line); for 2020-2030 (green line)

Wiesenburg/Mark: Population development
within the current boundaries (2020)

| Year | Pop. | ±% p.a. |
|---|---|---|
| 1875 | 5,868 | — |
| 1890 | 6,026 | +0.18% |
| 1910 | 6,084 | +0.05% |
| 1925 | 5,915 | −0.19% |
| 1939 | 5,845 | −0.08% |
| 1950 | 8,519 | +3.48% |
| 1964 | 7,146 | −1.25% |

| Year | Pop. | ±% p.a. |
|---|---|---|
| 1971 | 6,691 | −0.94% |
| 1981 | 6,190 | −0.78% |
| 1985 | 6,071 | −0.48% |
| 1990 | 5,685 | −1.31% |
| 1995 | 5,594 | −0.32% |
| 2000 | 5,435 | −0.58% |
| 2005 | 5,181 | −0.95% |

| Year | Pop. | ±% p.a. |
|---|---|---|
| 2010 | 4,708 | −1.90% |
| 2015 | 4,420 | −1.25% |
| 2016 | 4,302 | −2.67% |
| 2017 | 4,271 | −0.72% |
| 2018 | 4,295 | +0.56% |
| 2019 | 4,247 | −1.12% |
| 2020 | 4,242 | −0.12% |

== Climate ==
Climate data for Wiesenburg (1991–2020 normals)
| Month | Jan | Feb | Mar | Apr | May | Jun | Jul | Aug | Sep | Oct | Nov | Dec | Year |
|---|---|---|---|---|---|---|---|---|---|---|---|---|---|
| Mean daily maximum °C (°F) | 2.5 (36.5) | 4.0 (39.2) | 7.9 (46.2) | 14.2 (57.6) | 18.3 (64.9) | 21.8 (71.2) | 24.3 (75.7) | 23.6 (74.5) | 18.8 (65.8) | 12.9 (55.2) | 7.1 (44.8) | 3.5 (38.3) | 13.6 (56.5) |
| Daily mean °C (°F) | 0.2 (32.4) | 1.2 (34.2) | 4.0 (39.2) | 9.0 (48.2) | 13.4 (56.1) | 16.6 (61.9) | 19.0 (66.2) | 18.3 (64.9) | 14.3 (57.7) | 9.1 (48.4) | 4.7 (40.5) | 1.3 (34.3) | 9.4 (48.9) |
| Mean daily minimum °C (°F) | −2.2 (28.0) | −1.8 (28.8) | 0.6 (33.1) | 4.2 (39.6) | 8.0 (46.4) | 11.4 (52.5) | 13.8 (56.8) | 13.3 (55.9) | 9.9 (49.8) | 5.7 (42.3) | 2.0 (35.6) | −0.9 (30.4) | 5.5 (41.9) |
| Average precipitation mm (inches) | 52.9 (2.08) | 35.1 (1.38) | 37.3 (1.47) | 27.1 (1.07) | 57.8 (2.28) | 62.2 (2.45) | 87.3 (3.44) | 66.8 (2.63) | 56.3 (2.22) | 49.5 (1.95) | 45.5 (1.79) | 45.2 (1.78) | 621.5 (24.47) |
| Average precipitation days (≥ 1.0 mm) | 17.9 | 14.5 | 15.1 | 11.2 | 13.5 | 13.2 | 14.9 | 13.9 | 11.8 | 15.0 | 15.5 | 18.2 | 174.1 |
| Average relative humidity (%) | 88.6 | 83.9 | 78.5 | 71.0 | 69.6 | 70.2 | 69.2 | 71.2 | 77.4 | 84.9 | 90.6 | 90.3 | 78.8 |
| Mean monthly sunshine hours | 52.2 | 75.0 | 123.5 | 189.1 | 213.3 | 220.8 | 225.0 | 215.8 | 162.9 | 112.9 | 57.7 | 44.7 | 1,746.3 |
Source: World Meteorological Organisation

== Politics ==
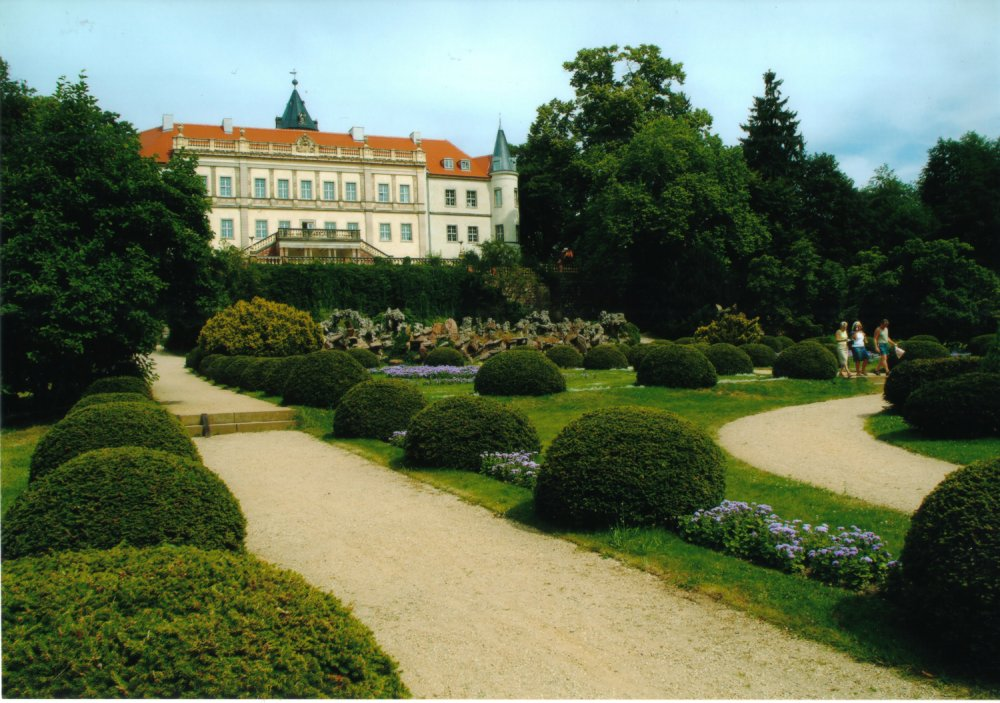
Wiesenburg Castle

The mayor of Wiesenburg/Mark is Marco Beckendorf of the Left Party (Die Linke). He was elected by the municipal council in 2014.

The municipal council currently has 16 members, of whom four belong to the Social Democrats (SPD), two each to the Left Party (Die Linke) and the Christian Democrats (CDU), and one each to The Greens and theFree Democrats (FDP). The remaining six councillors represent small local groups.

== Places of interest ==
The main attractions are the Wiesenburg Castle, a medieval castle that has been partially transformed into a neo-renaissance palace, and its park. Wiesenburg Castle is open to the public on selected days and for the Annual Christmas Market. "Event Calendar and Contact Information". 2019-08-17.

There is also a set of sculpture walks starting from Wiesenburg and heading towards Bad Belzig.
