= Keimzeit =

German rock band

- Origin: Lütte, near Potsdam, Germany (East)
- Genres: Rock, Ska
- Years active: 1979–present
- Members: Norbert Leisegang (vocals, guitar); Harmut Leisegang (bass); Roland Leisegang (drums); Ralf Benschu (saxophone); Rudi Feuerbach (guitar); Andreas „Spatz“ Sperling (keyboard)
- Past members: Matthias Opitz (1989–1993); Ulrich Sende (1984–2003); Tom Hahnemann (1986–1987); Marion Leisegang (until 1985)
- Website: www.keimzeit.de

Keimzeit is a German musical band formed in 1979 in Lütte (Belzig) near Potsdam, GDR (German Democratic Republic). Originally called Jogger, they changed their name to Keimzeit in 1982.

== History ==
The originally family-based band, led by Norbert Leisegang, at first performed live at festivals and parties in the region around Potsdam. They gained popularity across East Germany, and after the fall of the Berlin Wall they got the chance to tour the whole of Germany, achieving success in West Germany as well. In 1990 they released their first CD, Irrenhaus, and in 1993 they had their biggest hit with Kling Klang. Keimzeit still releases material and goes on tour almost every year, especially in Germany and Austria.

Due to their origins in East Germany, the band is often put in the category known as Ostrock, meaning "East-rock".

== Band members ==
=== Current members ===
- Norbert Leisegang - vocals, guitar
- Harmut Leisegang - bass
- Lin Dittmann - drums
- Andreas "Spatz" Sperling - keyboard (since 1993)
- Martin Weigel - guitar, vocals
- Sebastian Piskorz - trumpet

=== Original members ===
- Norbert Leisegang - vocals, guitar
- Harmut Leisegang - bass
- Roland Leisegang - drums (until 2013)
- Marion Leisegang - vocals (until 1985)

=== Other former members ===
- Matthias Opitz - keyboard (1989–1993)
- Ulrich Sende - guitar (1984–2003)
- Tom Hahnemann - saxophone (1986–1987)
- Rudi Feuerbach - guitar (2003-2011)
- Ralf Benschu - saxophone (1990-2009)

== Discography ==
- Irrenhaus (1990)
- Kapitel 11 (1991)
- Bunte Scherben (1993)
- Primeln & Elefanten (1995)
- Nachtvorstellung (1996)
- Im elektromagnetischen Feld (1998)
- Smart und gelassen warten (2000)
- 1000 Leute wie ich (2002)
- Privates Kino (2005)
- Mensch Meier - Live 2006 (2006)
- Stabile Währung Liebe (2009)
- Land in Sicht – Werkschau (2 CD) (2010)
- Kolumbus (2012)
- Midtsommer, Keimzeit Akustik Quintett (2013)
- Zusammen, Keimzeit & Deutsches Filmorchester Babelsberg (2014)
- Auf einem Esel ins All (2015)
- Land in Sicht (2 CD) (2016)
- Albertine, Keimzeit Akustik Quintett (2017)
- Irrenhaus (Re-edition) (2018)
- Das Schloss (2019)
