= Planetal =

- Municipality
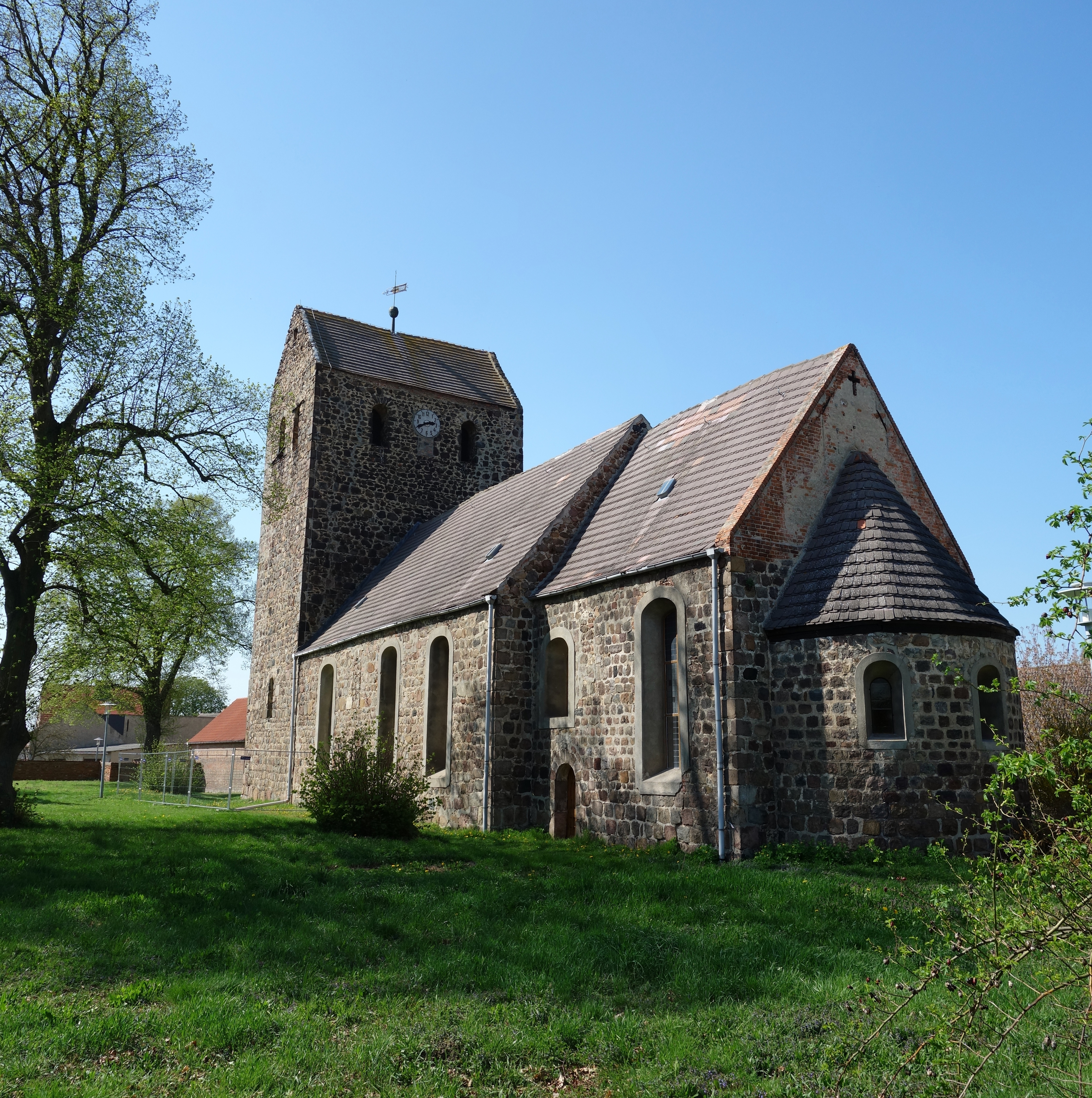
- Church of the former Teutonic Order in the Dahnsdorf quarter

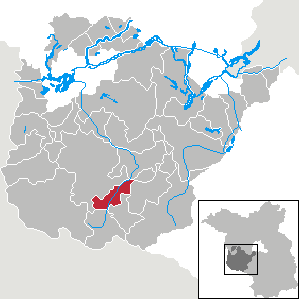
- Location of Planetal within Potsdam-Mittelmark district
- Interactive map of Planetal
- Location within Germany Location within Brandenburg
- Coordinates: 52°07′00″N 12°40′59″E
- Country: Germany
- State: Brandenburg
- District: Potsdam-Mittelmark
- Municipal assoc.: Niemegk
- Subdivisions: 4 Ortsteile (including Ziezow, Komturmühle, Neue Mühle)

Government
  - Mayor (2024–29): Karin Commichau

Area
  - Total: 42.52 km^{2} (16.42 sq mi)
- Elevation: 70 m (230 ft)

Population (2025-12-31)
  - Total: 863
  - Density: 20.3/km^{2} (52.6/sq mi)
- Time zone: UTC+01:00 (CET)
  - Summer (DST): UTC+02:00 (CEST)
- Postal codes: 14806
- Dialling codes: 033841, 033843
- Vehicle registration: PM
- Website: www.amt-niemegk.de

Planetal is a municipality in the Potsdam-Mittelmark district, southwestern Brandenburg, Germany, and is part of the collective municipality (Amt) of Niemegk.

== Geography ==
Planalet lies between the towns of Niemegk and Bad Belzig, perched on the northern edge of the Hoher Fläming region and adjacent to the Belzig landscape meadows. The municipality takes its name from the river Plane, which flows through the area. Administratively, Planetal comprises four main villages—Dahnsdorf, Kranepuhl, Mörz, and Locktow—with additional settlements including Ziezow, Komturmühle, and Neue Mühle.

== History ==
From 1815 until 1947, the areas that now make up Planetal were part of the Prussian Province of Brandenburg, within the Zauch-Belzig district. With administrative reforms in 1952, they became part of the Bezirk Potsdam in the German Democratic Republic (East Germany). Following reunification in 1990, Planetal was reintegrated into Brandenburg and since 1993 has belonged to the Potsdam-Mittelmark district. The current municipality was established on 1 July 2002 through the voluntary merger of Dahnsdorf, Kranepuhl, Mörz, and Locktow.

== Demography ==
Detailed annual population data for Planetal itself is not currently published. However, demographic trends can be inferred from development patterns of the collective municipality. The larger Amt Niemegk, including Planetal, has experienced a steady population decline from approximately 6,665 inhabitants in 1875 to around 4,617 in 2020.

== Infrastructure and Services ==
Planalet benefits from its membership within the Amt Niemegk, which provides central administrative services, infrastructure, and community amenities. Recent improvements, such as road widening projects—like the renovation of the Kreisstraße connecting Mörz and Dahnsdorf—have enhanced local connectivity.

== Economy and Land Use ==
The local economy is primarily rural, with agriculture, forestry, and small local enterprises forming its backbone. The surrounding forests and farmland, typical of Fläming Heath, support mixed farming, timber production, and related economic activities.

== Culture and Landmarks ==
The most notable cultural landmark in Planetal is the Church of the former Teutonic Order in Dahnsdorf, a historical building reflecting the region’s medieval roots. The overall architecture and settlement patterns in the municipality echo the rural character of Brandenburg’s smaller communities.
