= High Fläming Nature Park =

Nature park in Brandenburg, Germany

- Location within Germany
- Location: Brandenburg, Germany
- Nearest city: Belzig
- Coordinates: 52°08′0″N 12°36′0″E
- Area: 827 km^{2} (319 sq mi)
- Established: November 28, 1997
- Governing body: Naturparkverwaltung Hoher Fläming

High Fläming Nature Park (German: Naturpark Hoher Fläming) is an 827 km^{2} nature park in Potsdam-Mittelmark district in the German state Brandenburg. It is the third largest of 11 nature parks in the state of Brandenburg. In 1997, it was declared a nature park by the State Minister for the Environment.

There is a visitor center in Rabenstein/Fläming offering information, an interesting exhibition, a bike rental and a shop with regional products.

== Geography ==
The park is located about 80 km southwest of Berlin and Potsdam and covers the higher parts of the Fläming hill chain. The highest elevation is the Hagelberg (200,24 m). In the southwest, the region borders the Fläming Nature Park in the state of Saxony-Anhalt.

Bad Belzig is the largest and most important town in the region, which is home to around 27.000 inhabitants overall. Other towns include Wiesenburg/Mark, Görzke, Niemegk and Brück. The population density is 30 inhabitants per km^{2}.

About half of the area is forests, the other half is agricultural land. There are few lakes, but some clear creeks and small rivers that provide a habitat for several protected species.

The nature park has very good traffic infrastructure. It can be reached by car using the A2 (Berlin-Hannover) (exits at Ziesar (76), Wollin (77), Brandenburg (78)) or A9 motorways (Berlin - Leipzig) (exits at Brück, Niemegk und Klein Marzehns). The region is also served by a good railroad connection from Berlin, Potsdam and Dessau.

== Nature ==
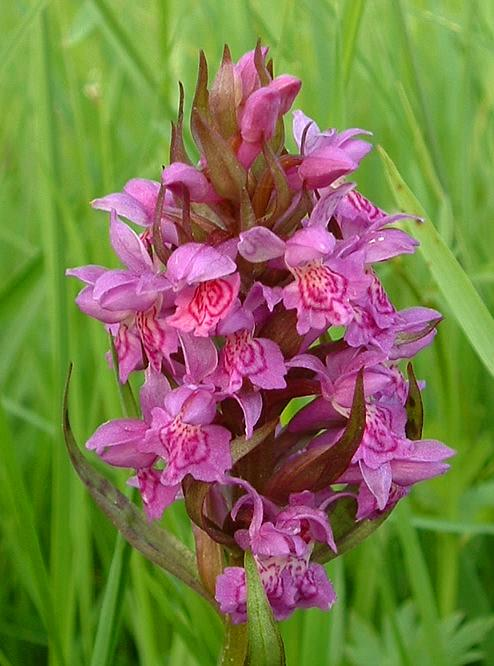
Western march orchid

=== Landscape ===
The nature park is divided into two sections: In the south, the hilly and wooded landscape of the High Fläming and in the north a flat lowland, called "Belziger Landschaftswiesen" (Belzig landscape meadows). The more than 140,000-year-old heights are moraines.

The nature park area is about half wooded, and the other half is agricultural land. It is characterized by a constant change of forest and field. In some places, you will see the original beech forest. Open lakes and other water - apart from a few ponds - there are hardly any. However, there are many brooks that are among the cleanest in Brandenburg and are very valuable for nature protection.

With the so-called "Rummeln", a form of dry valleys, the High Fläming has a unique botanical and geological feature.

=== Animals and plants ===
The Fläming is rich in wildlife (fallow deer, red deer, raccoon dog and the mouflon). Among the most noteworthy species in the nature park are the black stork, the common noctule, a microbat, and the middle spotted woodpecker, the mascot of the nature parks. In the creeks the brown trout, the white-throated dipper, the brook lamprey and the European crayfish can be found. The great bustard and the western marsh orchid are native to the lowlands.

=== Protected areas ===
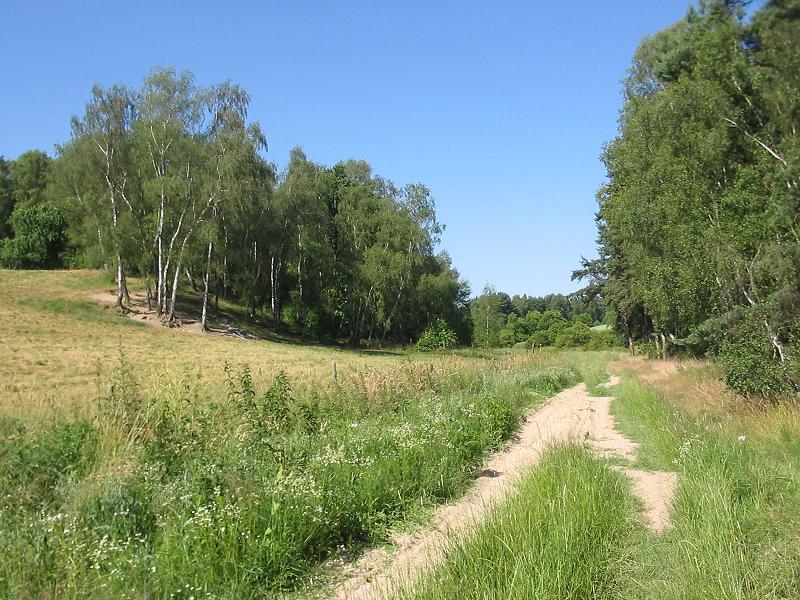
Rummel close to Preußnitz

Virtually the entire natural park area is a landscape protection area. The regulation on the landscape conservation area "Hoher Fläming und Belziger Landschaftswiesen" of 17 November 1997 became effective on 3 December 1997.

Moreover, there are nine nature reserves in the nature park . Some of the valuable streams in the Fläming are protected (Verlorenwasserbach, Bullenberger Bach, Planetal). There is also protected forest and moorland (Rabenstein, Spring, Werbiger Heide). Some nature reserves have been set up by the GDR. The nature protection areas (with the date of entry into force) in the nature park are those:

- Bullenberger Bach / Briesener Bach (24 May 2003)
- Klein Marzehns (1 May 1961)
- Flämingbuchen (30 March 1961)
- Planetal (19 October 1967)
- Rabenstein (20 June 1978)
- Spring (17 March 1986)
- Verlorenwasserbach, Oberlauf (26 May 2005)
- Werbiger Heide (19 November 1999)
- Belziger Landschaftswiesen (24 May 2003)

== Culture ==
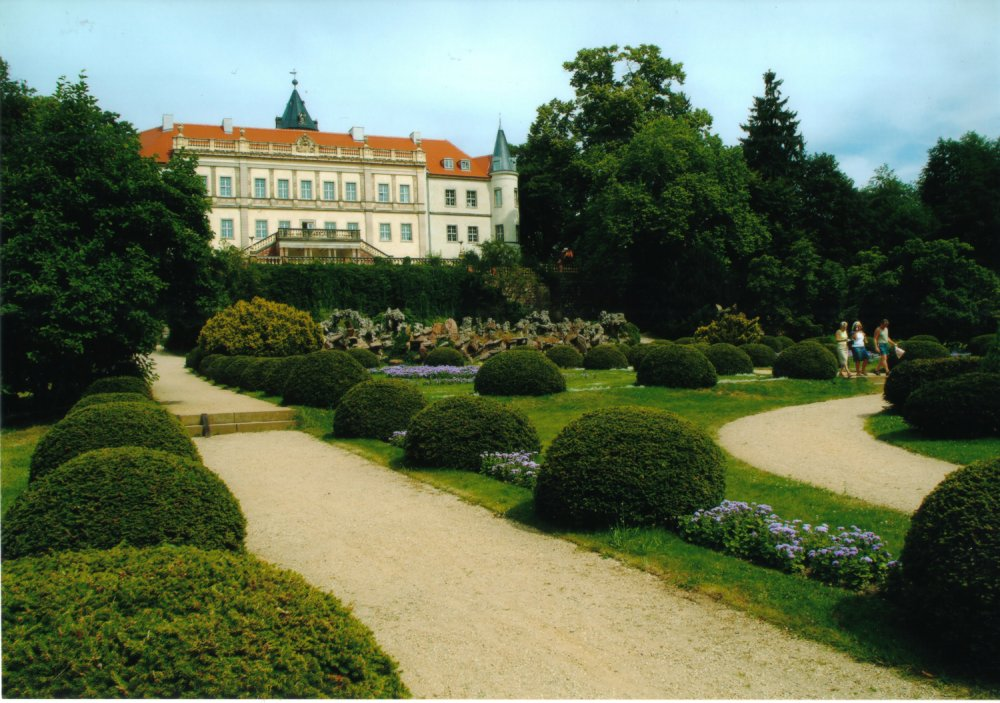
Wiesenburg Castle

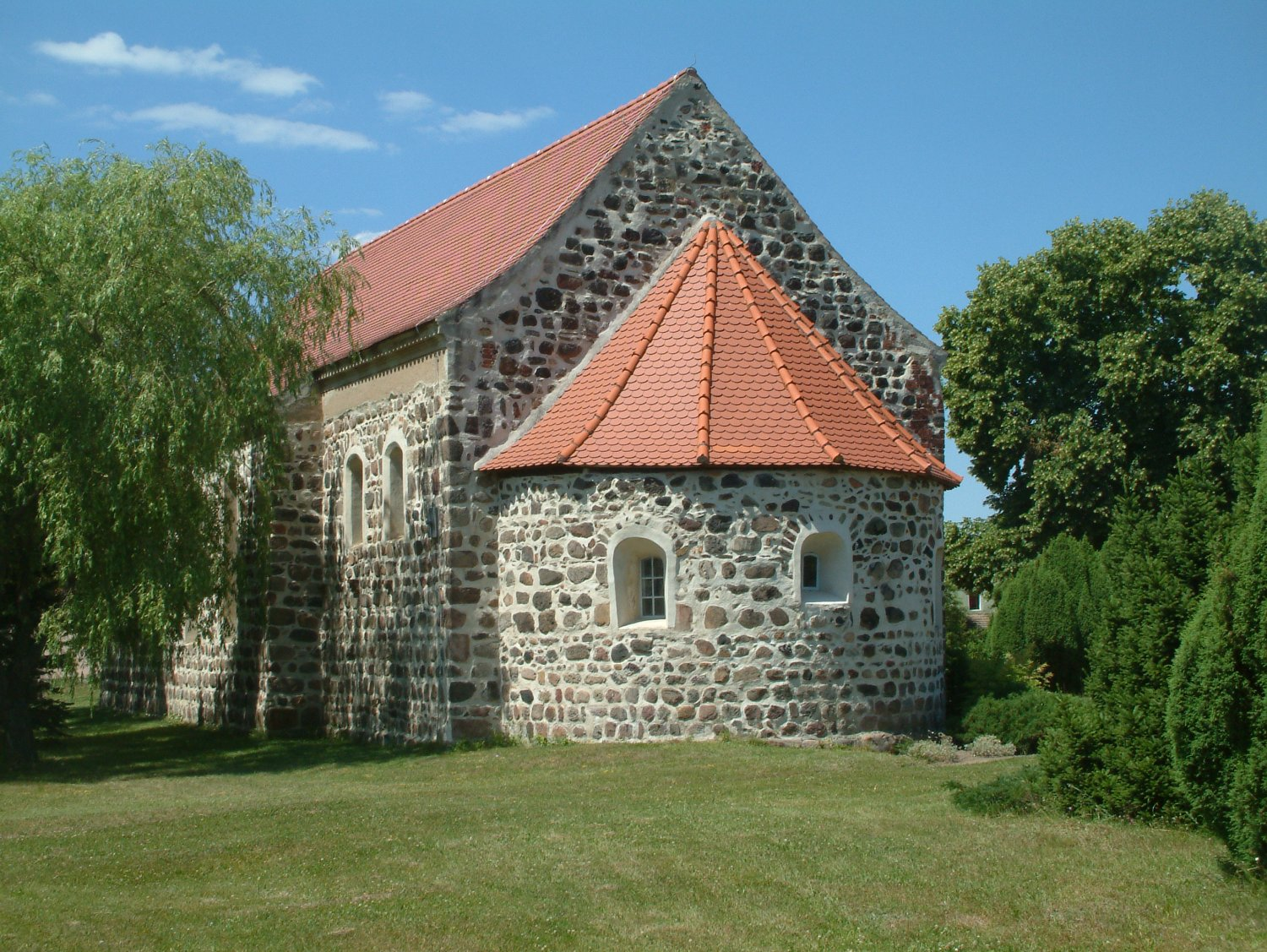
Stone church in Jeserig/Fläming

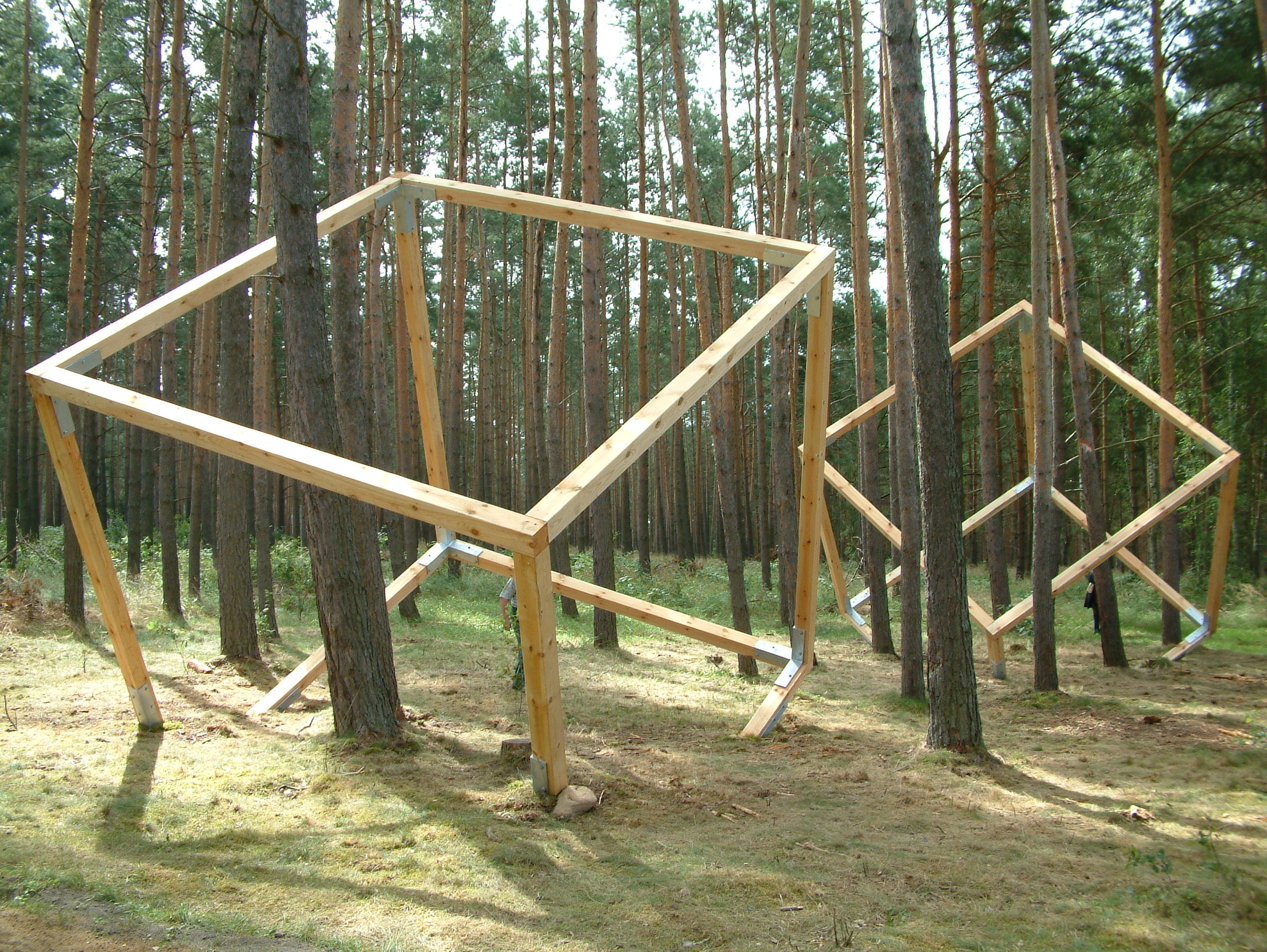
Art Trail: "Unter Kiefern" by Susken Rosenthal

=== Castles and palaces ===
Of particular interest are the four medieval castles in Fläming: Eisenhardt Castle in Belzig, Rabenstein Castle, Ziesar Castle and Wiesenburg Palace. In its present form Wiesenburg Palace is a neo-Renaissance building, but it was originally built as a medieval castle of which some elements are still preserved.

Presently there is a museum and a hotel in Eisenhardt Castle in Belzig.

Wiesenburg Palace is privately owned and is used for residential purposes. The castle tower can be visited and houses the tourist information of the community. The Palace has a park that is designed as a landscape park. The 123-hectare park is considered the most important park between Potsdam and the Dessau-Wörlitz Gardens. In 2004, there was a sculpture exhibit in the park.

Ziesar Castle houses a museum on the history of Christianity the Mark Brandenburg.

There is a hostel and a restaurant in Rabenstein Castle.

=== Historic town centres ===
The historic town centres of Belzig and Ziesar and are worth visiting. Both cities are members of the Association of Cities with Historic City Centres in Brandenburg". Niemegk also has a historic city centre with a Renaissance town hall.

=== Stone churches ===
Typical for the Fläming are medieval churches, made of stones that were gathered in the region.

=== kunst land hoher fläming - land art ===
Under the brand "kunst land hoher fläming" artists and others involved organize artistic activities in the countryside. It started in 2004 with the Sculpture Park at Wiesenburg Castle Park. In 2006, an "art trail" was realized, a 2.5 km long track with works of art designed by local artists. In the summer of 2007, a 17-km-long art track that connects the train stations of Belzig and Wiesenburg was opened. Ten works of art can be seen along the trail. The ten artists whose works have been realized, had prevailed in a nationwide art competition.

=== Theatre and concerts ===
Theater performances are regularly given in the summer in Wiesenburg Castle Park and in the courtyard of Ziesar Castle. In Belzig, the birthplace of the composer Carl Gottlieb Reissiger, his works are occasionally performed.

== Visitor Center "Old Distillery" ==
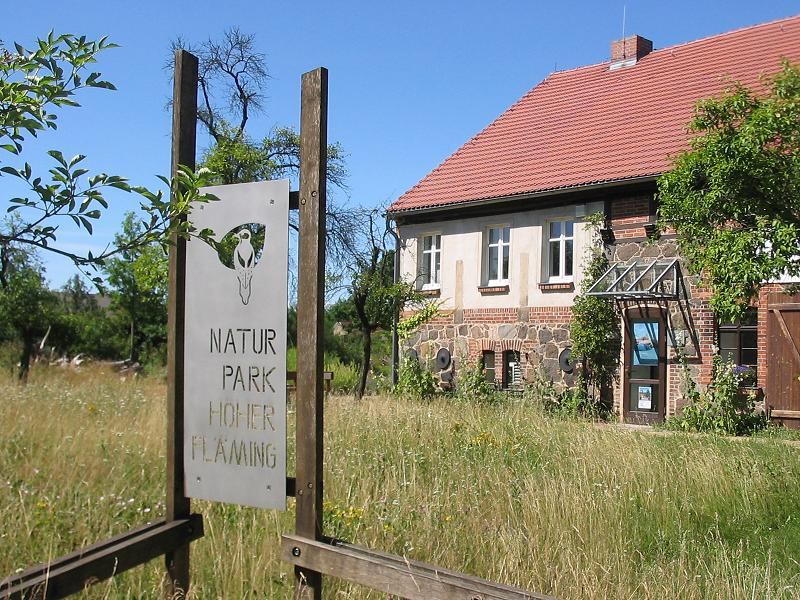
The visitor center

The visitor center of the nature park is located in the village Raben in the municipality Rabenstein/Fläming. The building now used as visitor center is called "Old Distillery" because in the 18th century it was a liquor distillery. It was constructed around 1700 as a commercial building for Rabenstein Castle. From 1863 it was used as a pumping station to secure the water supply of the castle. Remnants of the horse-driven gear and water boilers can still be seen today. After a period of decline from 1945, in 1996 the historic building was finally restored by Potsdam-Mittelmark County in order to become the visitor center of the new nature park. In May 1997, the visitor center was opened to the public. The visitor information is run by the Nature Park Association Fläming.

An exhibition on the upper floor of the visitor center informs about all aspects of the nature park. In addition, there is tourist information which offers maps and leaflets with route recommendations and literature. In the basement vaults of the Garden House there is a shop selling local products, like pottery, honey, beeswax candles, jams and jellies and fruit schnapps. There is also a bike rental. The visitor center is open daily from 9:00 to 17:00.

In the visitor center, the nature park administration and the Nature Park Association Fläming have their offices.

== Statistical data ==
- Total area: 827 km ^{2} (100%)
- Nature reserves: 48.8 km ^{2} (5.9%)
- Protected Areas: 754 km ^{2} (91.2%)
- Population: about 27,000
- Population density: about 30 pe / km ^{2}
- Agricultural area: 403 km ^{2} (49%)
- Forest: 404 km ^{2} (49%)
- Water: 0.3 km ^{2} (0.1%)
