= Rabenstein =

- Municipality
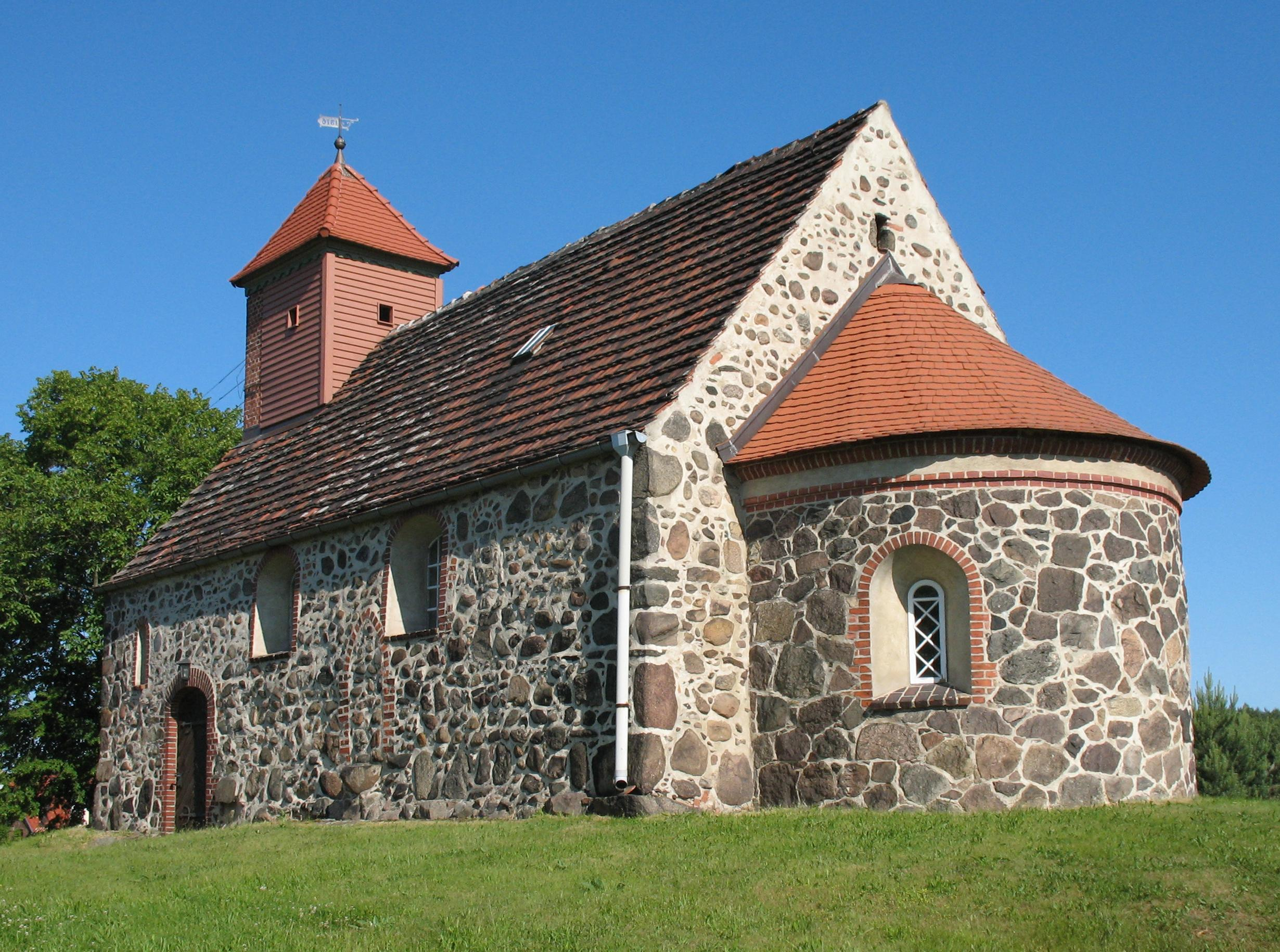
- Church in Klein Marzehns

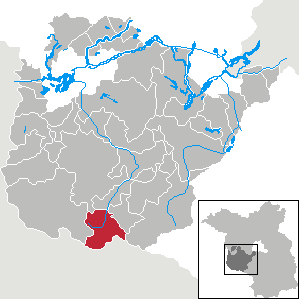
- Location of Rabenstein within Potsdam-Mittelmark district
- Interactive map of Rabenstein
- Location within Germany Location within Brandenburg
- Coordinates: 52°2′N 12°35′E
- Country: Germany
- State: Brandenburg
- District: Potsdam-Mittelmark
- Municipal assoc.: Niemegk

Government
  - Mayor (2024–29): Siegfried Frenzel

Area
  - Total: 78.89 km^{2} (30.46 sq mi)
- Elevation: 100 m (330 ft)

Population (2025-12-31)
  - Total: 804
  - Density: 10.2/km^{2} (26.4/sq mi)
- Time zone: UTC+01:00 (CET)
  - Summer (DST): UTC+02:00 (CEST)
- Postal codes: 14823
- Dialling codes: 033843, 033848
- Vehicle registration: PM
- Website: www.amt-niemegk.de

Rabenstein (officially: Rabenstein/Fläming) is a municipality in the Potsdam-Mittelmark district, in Brandenburg, Germany.

== Demography ==
Development of population since 1875 within the current Boundaries (Blue Line: Population; Dotted Line: Comparison to Population development in Brandenburg state; Grey Background: Time of Nazi Germany; Red Background: Time of communist East Germany)

Rabenstein/Fläming: Population development
within the current boundaries (2013)

| Year | Pop. | ±% p.a. |
|---|---|---|
| 1875 | 1,424 | — |
| 1890 | 1,360 | −0.31% |
| 1910 | 1,555 | +0.67% |
| 1925 | 1,425 | −0.58% |
| 1933 | 1,402 | −0.20% |
| 1939 | 1,306 | −1.18% |
| 1946 | 2,263 | +8.17% |
| 1950 | 1,987 | −3.20% |
| 1964 | 1,466 | −2.15% |
| 1971 | 1,399 | −0.67% |
| 1981 | 1,244 | −1.17% |
| 1985 | 1,211 | −0.67% |
| 1989 | 1,211 | +0.00% |
| 1990 | 1,190 | −1.73% |
| 1991 | 1,144 | −3.87% |
| 1992 | 1,119 | −2.19% |
| 1993 | 1,124 | +0.45% |
| 1994 | 1,099 | −2.22% |
| 1995 | 1,080 | −1.73% |
| 1996 | 1,067 | −1.20% |

| Year | Pop. | ±% p.a. |
|---|---|---|
| 1997 | 1,046 | −1.97% |
| 1998 | 1,024 | −2.10% |
| 1999 | 1,006 | −1.76% |
| 2000 | 991 | −1.49% |
| 2001 | 990 | −0.10% |
| 2002 | 996 | +0.61% |
| 2003 | 966 | −3.01% |
| 2004 | 953 | −1.35% |
| 2005 | 933 | −2.10% |
| 2006 | 902 | −3.32% |
| 2007 | 913 | +1.22% |
| 2008 | 885 | −3.07% |
| 2009 | 870 | −1.69% |
| 2010 | 856 | −1.61% |
| 2011 | 860 | +0.47% |
| 2012 | 855 | −0.58% |
| 2013 | 838 | −1.99% |
| 2014 | 842 | +0.48% |
| 2015 | 820 | −2.61% |
| 2016 | 802 | −2.20% |
