= Tree-top walk Beelitz-Heilstätten =

Canopy walkway in Germany

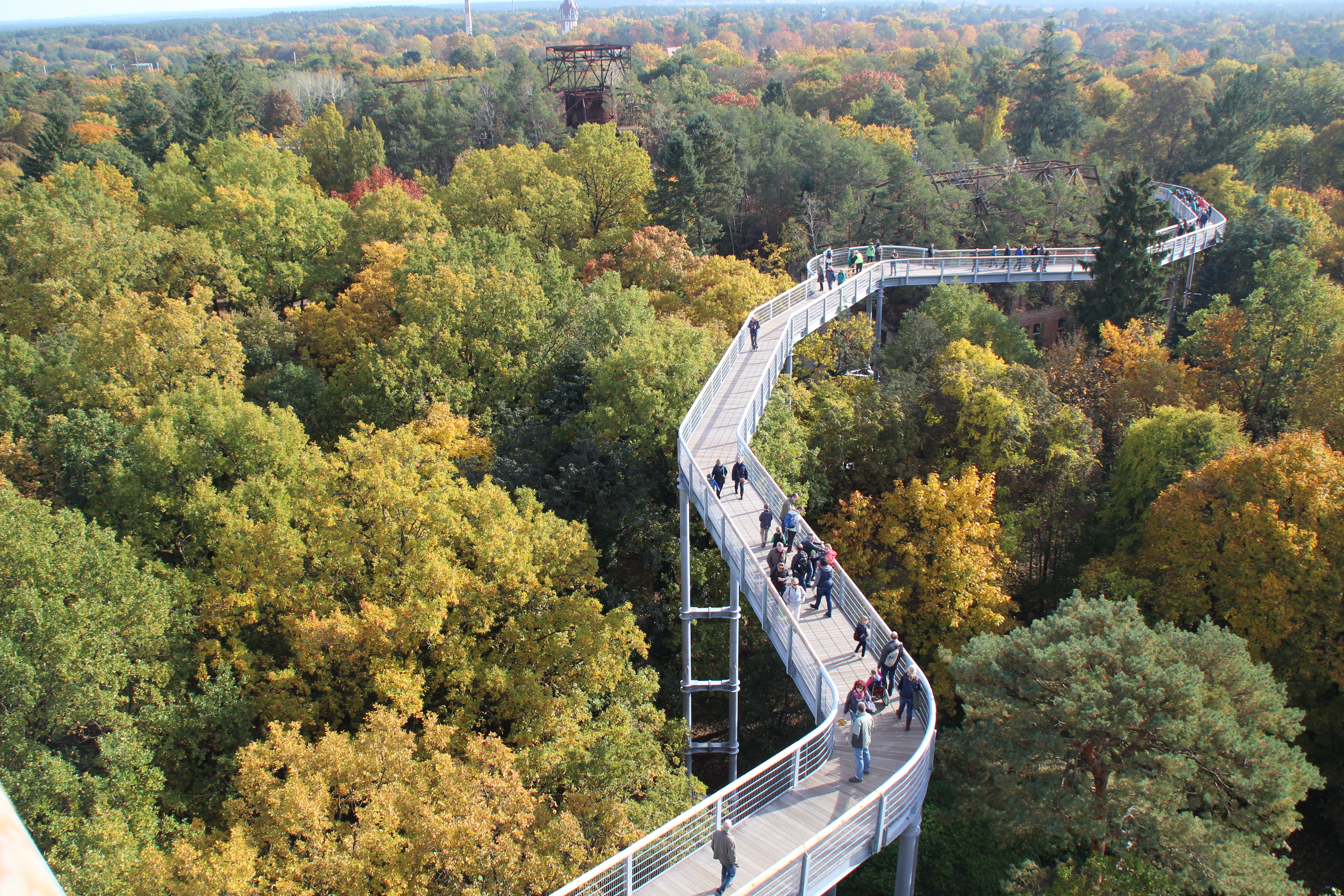
Tree-top walk Beelitz-Heilstätten

The Tree-top walk Beelitz-Heilstätten was opened in 2015 as the first tree-top walk in the state of Brandenburg in Germany on the grounds of the former women's lung sanatorium in Beelitz-Heilstätten, a district of the town of Beelitz in the Potsdam-Mittelmark district. The Tree-top Walk Experience Area includes not only the actual tree-top walk but also a viewing tower and a bistro, and is operated by HPG Projektentwicklungs GmbH under the name "Baum & Zeit" (Tree & Time).

== Layout ==
=== The Walk ===
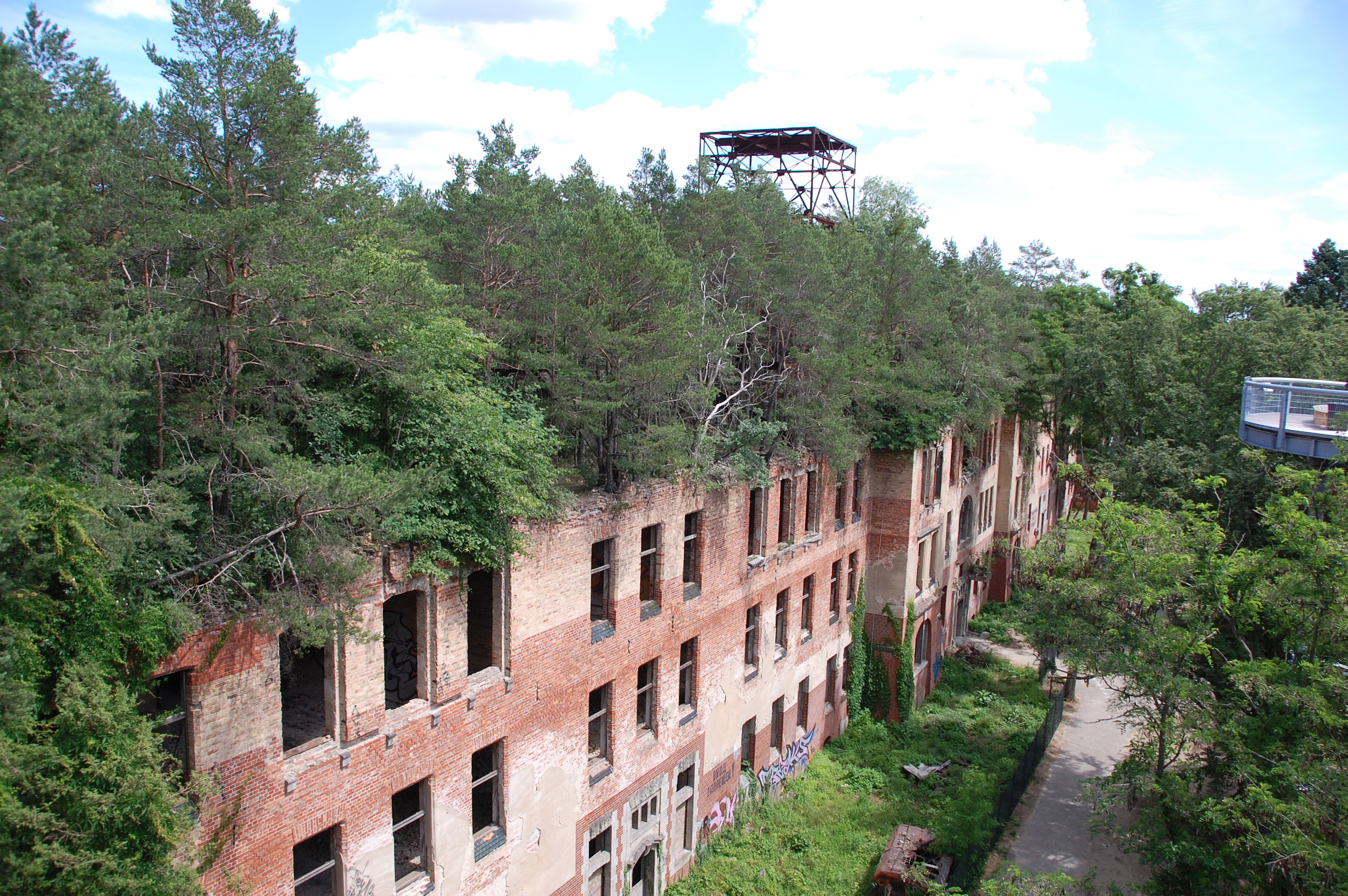
View from the walk onto the “Alpenhaus”

The nearly 800 meter long tree-top walk Beelitz-Heilstätten runs between its two entrances as a 2.2 meter wide wooden walkway on a slightly curved steel structure at a height above ground between approximately 17 and 23 meters. The western access is provided at the viewing tower that is there, either accessible via an elevator or via stairs. The walk crosses the ruin of Pavilion B IV of the women's lung sanatorium, known as the “Alpenhaus”, which was destroyed by fire in 1945. Here, relics of the old furnishings, remnants of the former roof structure, and the trees that have been growing on the building's roof for over 60 years are almost within reach. Information panels along the walk explain the history of the various buildings of the sanatorium and the diversity of plants in the forest park. Shortly before the end of the tree-top walk, there is another access near the northeast corner of the Alpenhaus, but only via stairs.

At about halfway along the tree-top walk, there is an emergency staircase south of the Alpenhaus as a possible escape route.

=== Viewing Tower ===
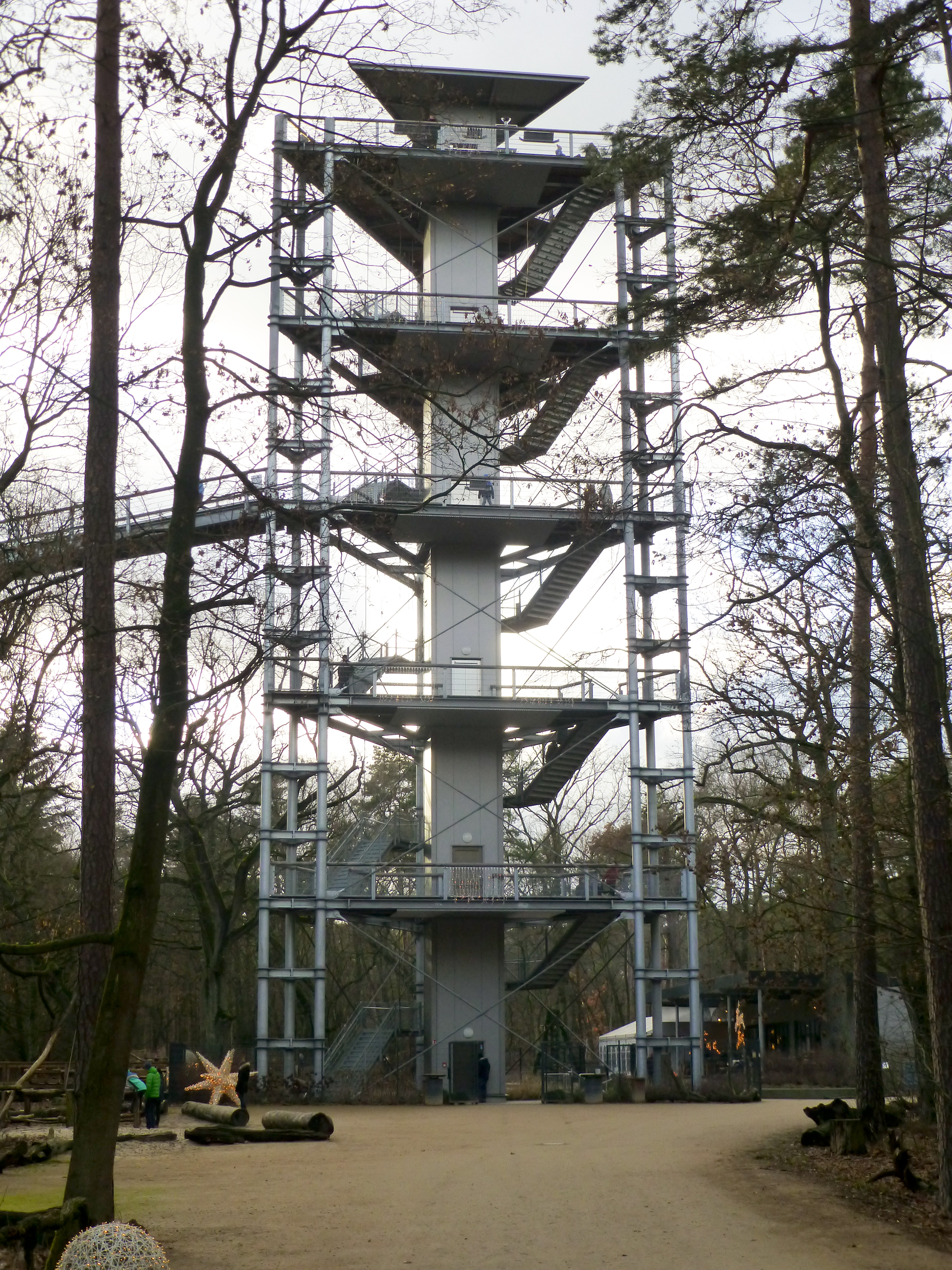
Viewing tower of the tree-top walk Beelitz-Heilstätten

In the northwest part of the area, there is a prominent landmark, a 40.5 meter high viewing tower constructed in steel with a triangular base, whose five levels can be reached either by an elevator or via a staircase built around the elevator shaft. Access to the tree-top walk is from the third level of the tower, which is at a height of 21.6 meters. The top fifth level, at 36 meters, serves as a viewing platform. On this level, there are information panels about the surrounding buildings as well as a telescope. From here, there is an excellent view of the extensive grounds of the sanatorium and, with good visibility, as far as the Fläming region to the south and Berlin to the north.

The viewing tower is located at an elevation of 67.4m above sea level, was opened on 11 September 2015 after a construction period of three months, and stands on a 280 m^{2} foundation, for which about 700 tons of concrete were used. The total weight of the tower is 170 tons, and its construction costs amounted to one million euros. There are a total of 200 steps to climb to the upper viewing platform via the stairs.

== Additional Information ==
In addition to independently exploring the area, which requires an entrance fee, various guided tours are offered, including visits to noteworthy buildings and the forest park. From May to September, another tourist highlight is accessible: a barefoot park adjacent to the experience area.

In 2017, the tree-top walk received the Tourism Award of the State of Brandenburg.
