= Riebener See =

Lake in Brandenburg, Germany

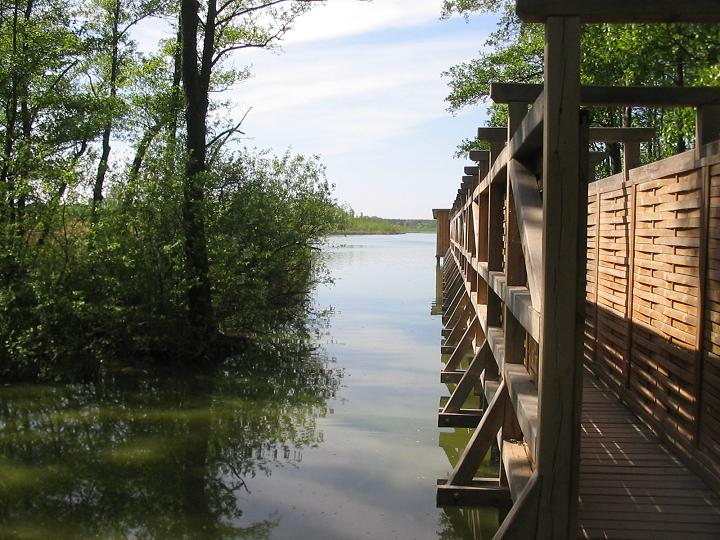

- Location within Brandenburg
- Location: Brandenburg
- Coordinates: 52°11′31″N 13°3′6″E
- Primary inflows: none
- Primary outflows: Vohskutengraben
- Basin countries: Germany
- Max. length: ca. 1,000 m (3,300 ft)
- Max. width: 600 m (2,000 ft)
- Surface area: 38 ha (94 acres)
- Average depth: ca. 1 m (3 ft 3 in)
- Surface elevation: 34 m (112 ft)

Riebener See is a lake in Brandenburg, Germany. At an elevation of 34 m, its surface area is 38 ha. It is located in Rieben, an Ortsteil of the town of Beelitz.
