= Beelitz-Heilstätten station =

Railway station in Germany

Beelitz-Heilstätten
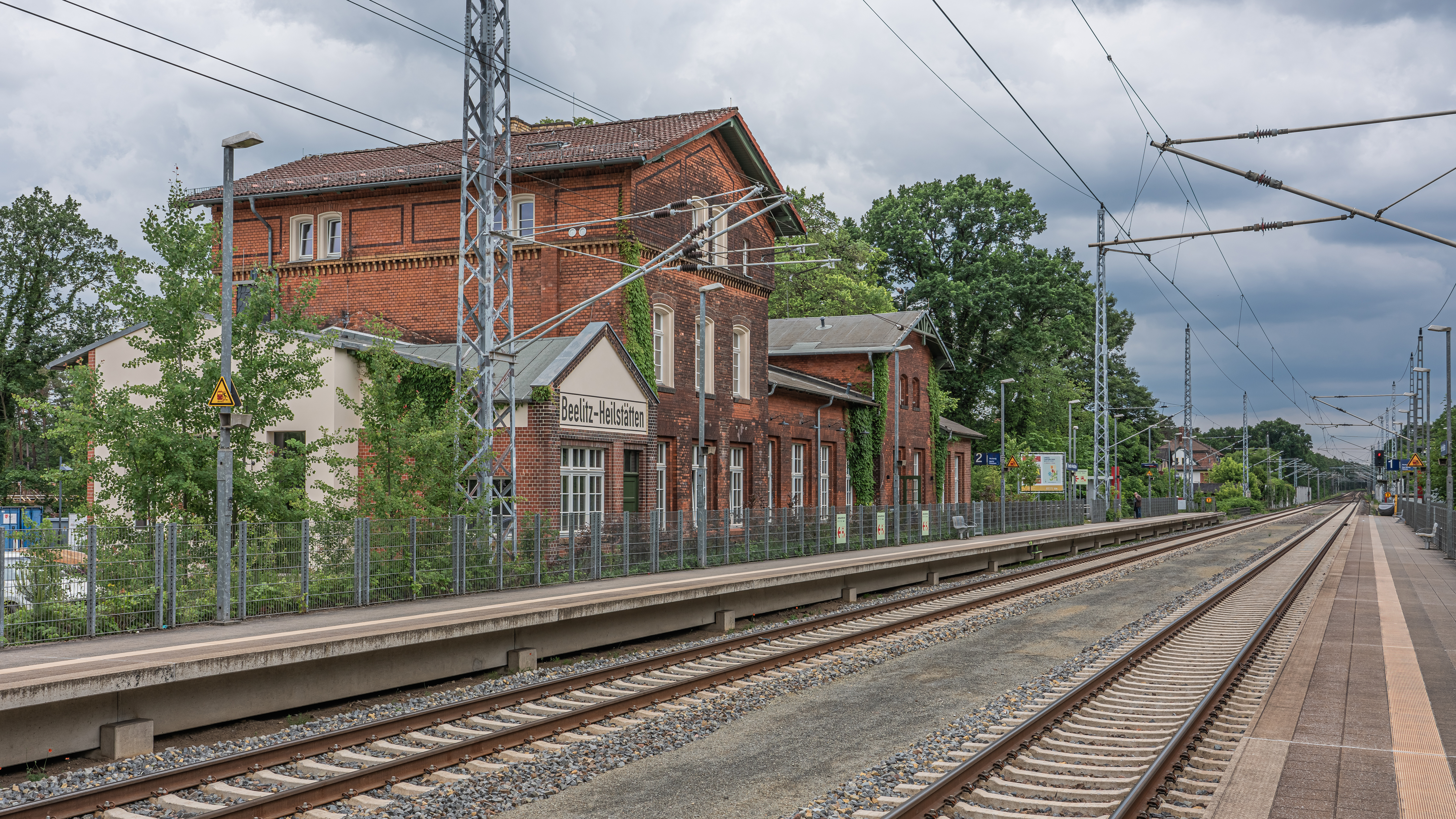
- In 2022

General information
- Location: Straße am Bahnhof 1; 14547 Beelitz; Brandenburg; Germany
- Coordinates: 52.2623°N 12.9259°E
- Owner: DB Netz
- Operator: DB Station&Service
- Line: Berlin-Blankenheim railway
- Train operators: DB Regio Nordost

Other information
- Station code: 452
- DS100 code: BBEL
- IBNR: 8013467
- Category: 6
- Fare zone: : 6149
- Website: www.bahnhof.de

Services
| Preceding station | DB Regio Nordost | Following station |
|---|---|---|
| Borkheide towards Dessau Hbf | RE 7 | Seddin towards Senftenberg |
Location
- Location within Brandenburg

Beelitz-Heilstätten station is a railway station in the district of Beelitz-Heilstätten which belongs to the town of Beelitz located in the district of Potsdam-Mittelmark, Brandenburg, Germany.

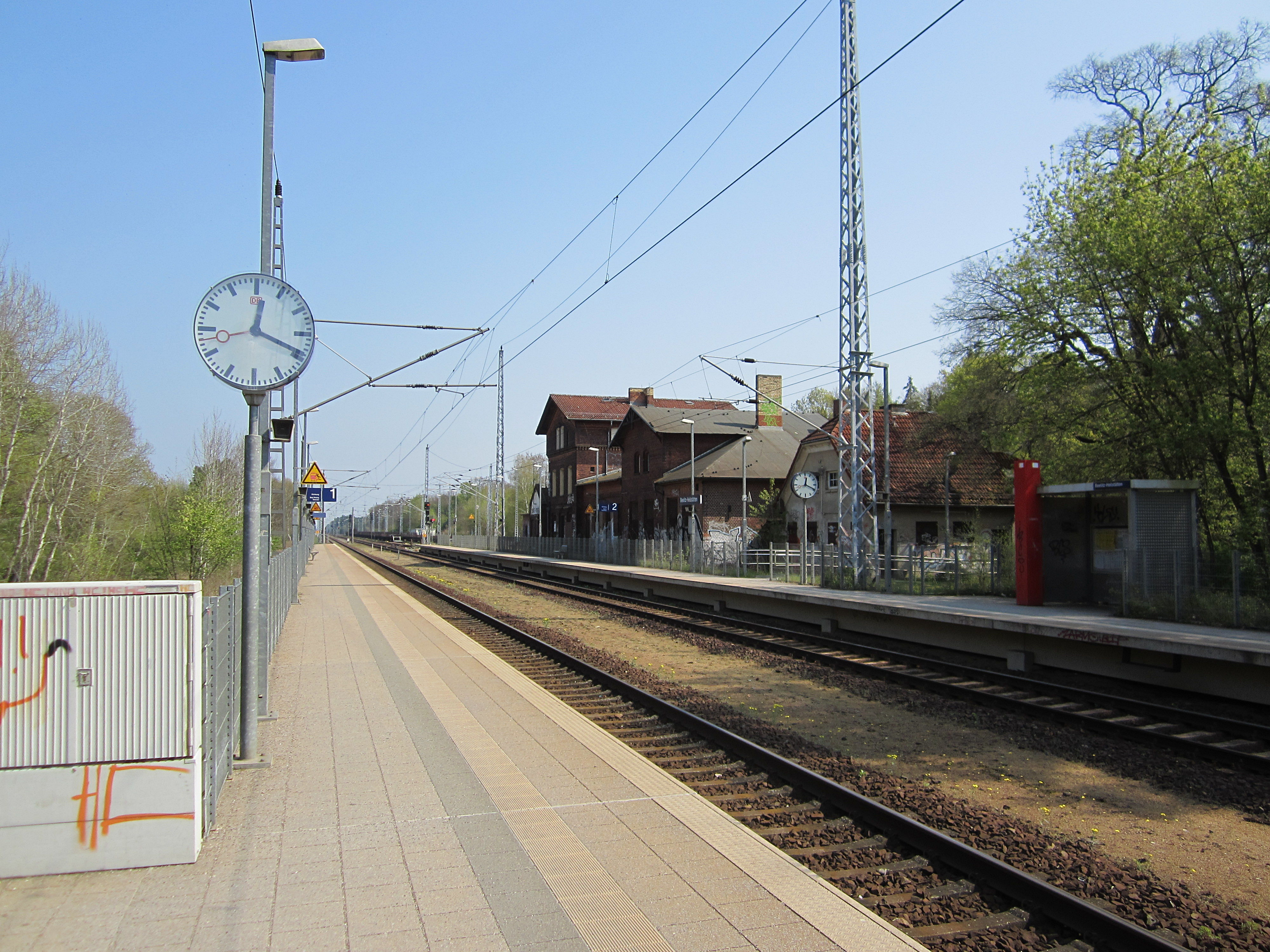
In 2014

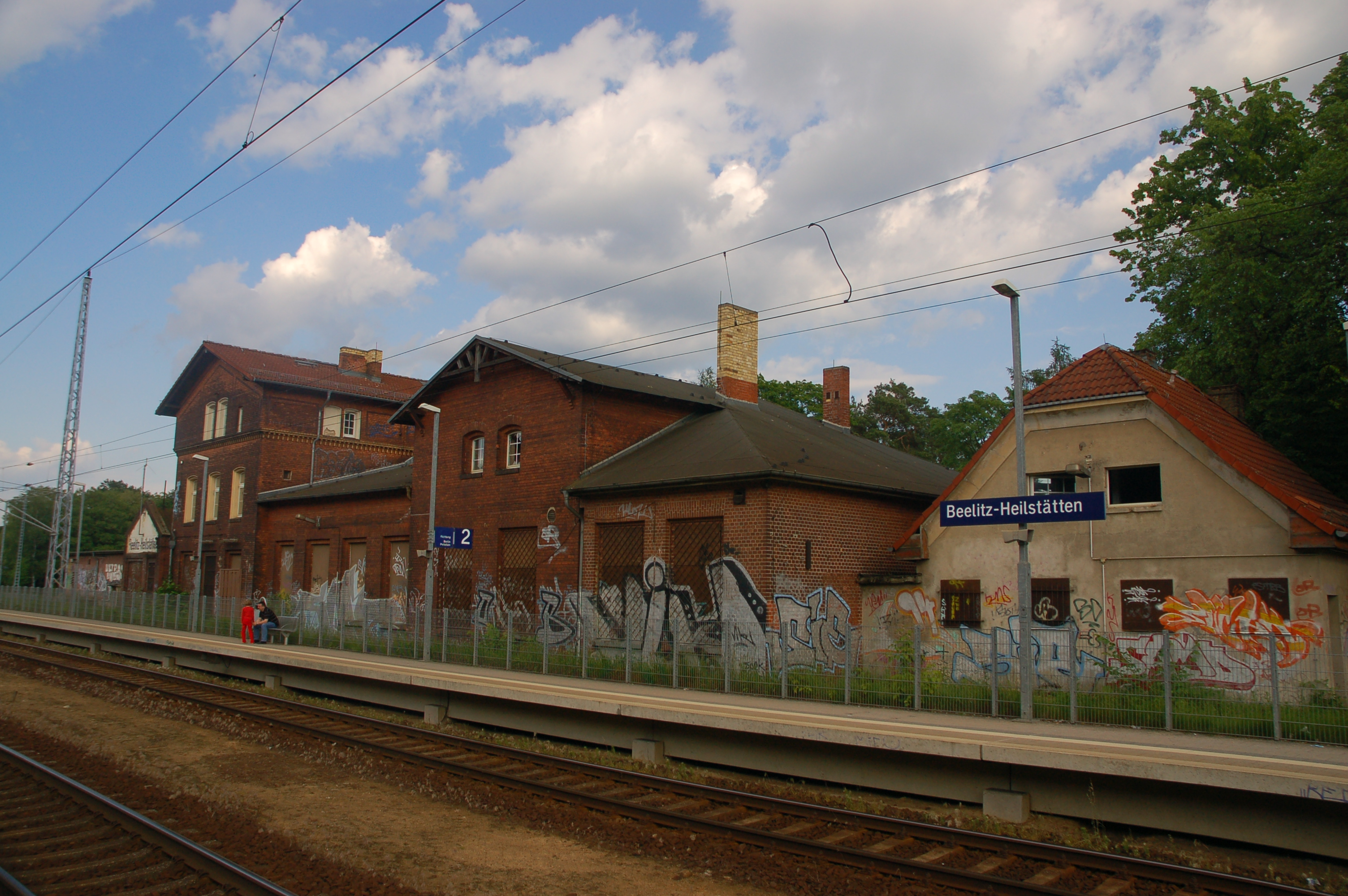
In June 2009
