= Seddin station =

Railway station in Seddiner See, Germany

Seddin
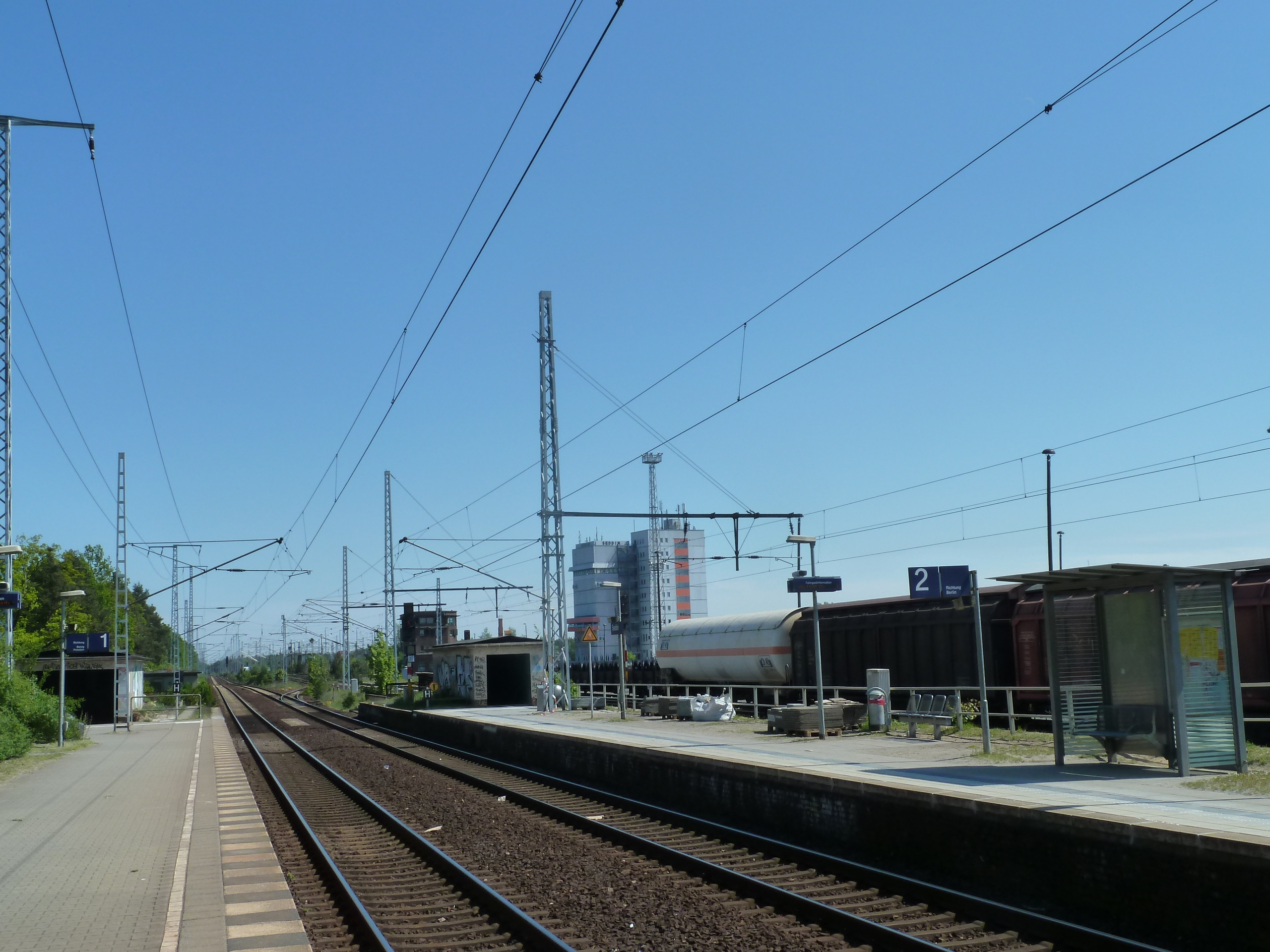
- 2011

General information
- Location: Kunersdorfer Straße 1; 14554 Seddin; Brandenburg; Germany
- Coordinates: 52.2915°N 12.9845°E
- Owner: DB Netz
- Operator: DB Station&Service
- Line: Berlin-Blankenheim railway
- Train operators: DB Regio Nordost

Other information
- Station code: 5775
- DS100 code: BSE
- IBNR: 8013492
- Category: 5
- Fare zone: VBB: Berlin C and Potsdam C/5950
- Website: www.bahnhof.de

History
- Opened: 2 February 1914; 112 years ago

Services
Preceding station	DB Regio Nordost	Following station
Beelitz-Heilstätten towards Dessau Hbf	RE 7	Michendorf towards Senftenberg
Location
- Location within Brandenburg Location within Germany Location within Europe

Seddin station is a railway station in Neuseddin, district of the municipality Seddiner See located in the district of Potsdam-Mittelmark, Brandenburg, Germany. It is one of the most important classification yards of DB Netz in the eastern part of Germany and belongs to the nine large train formation facilities of DB Cargo in Germany.

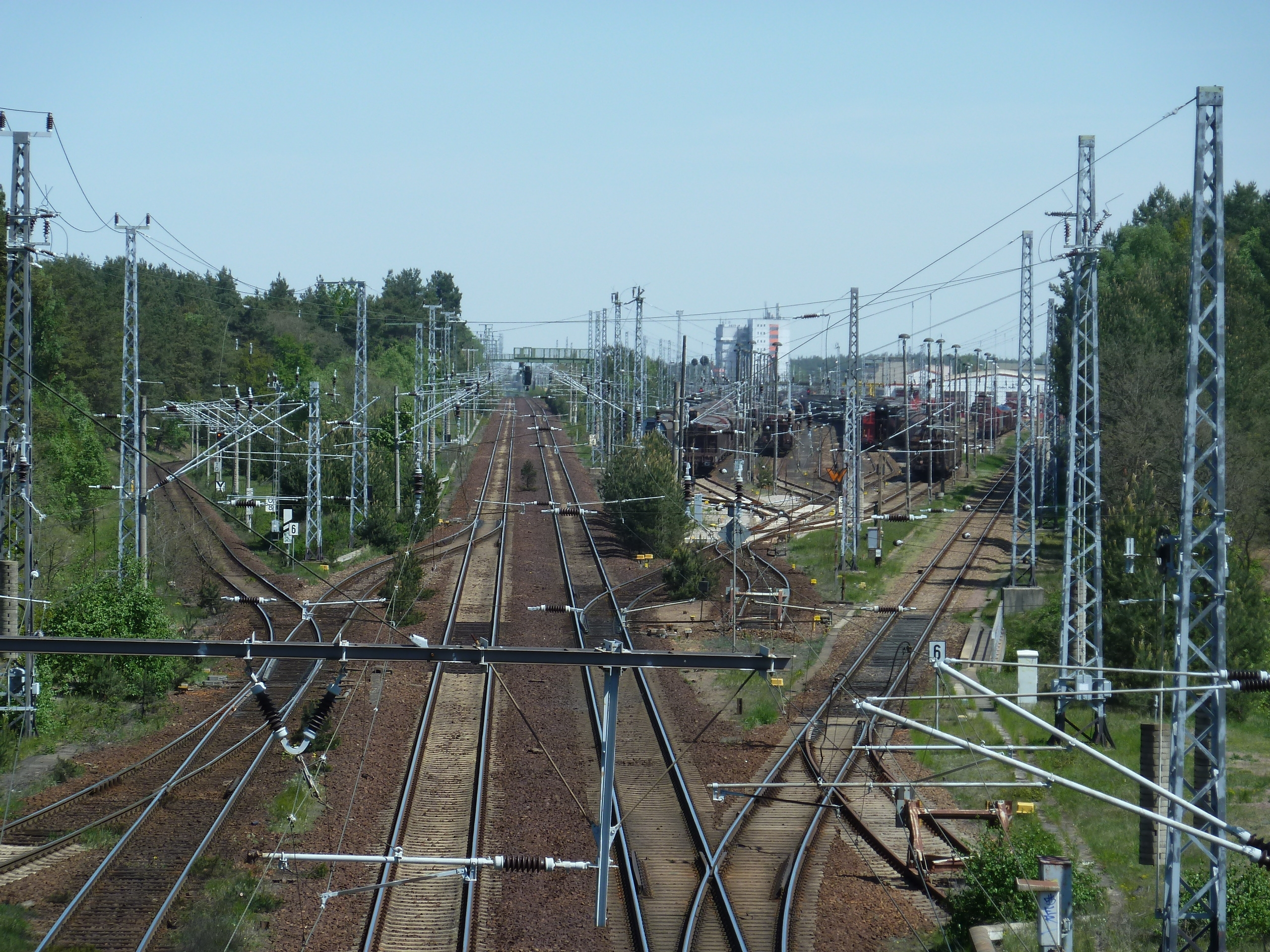
View from the southwest (2011).

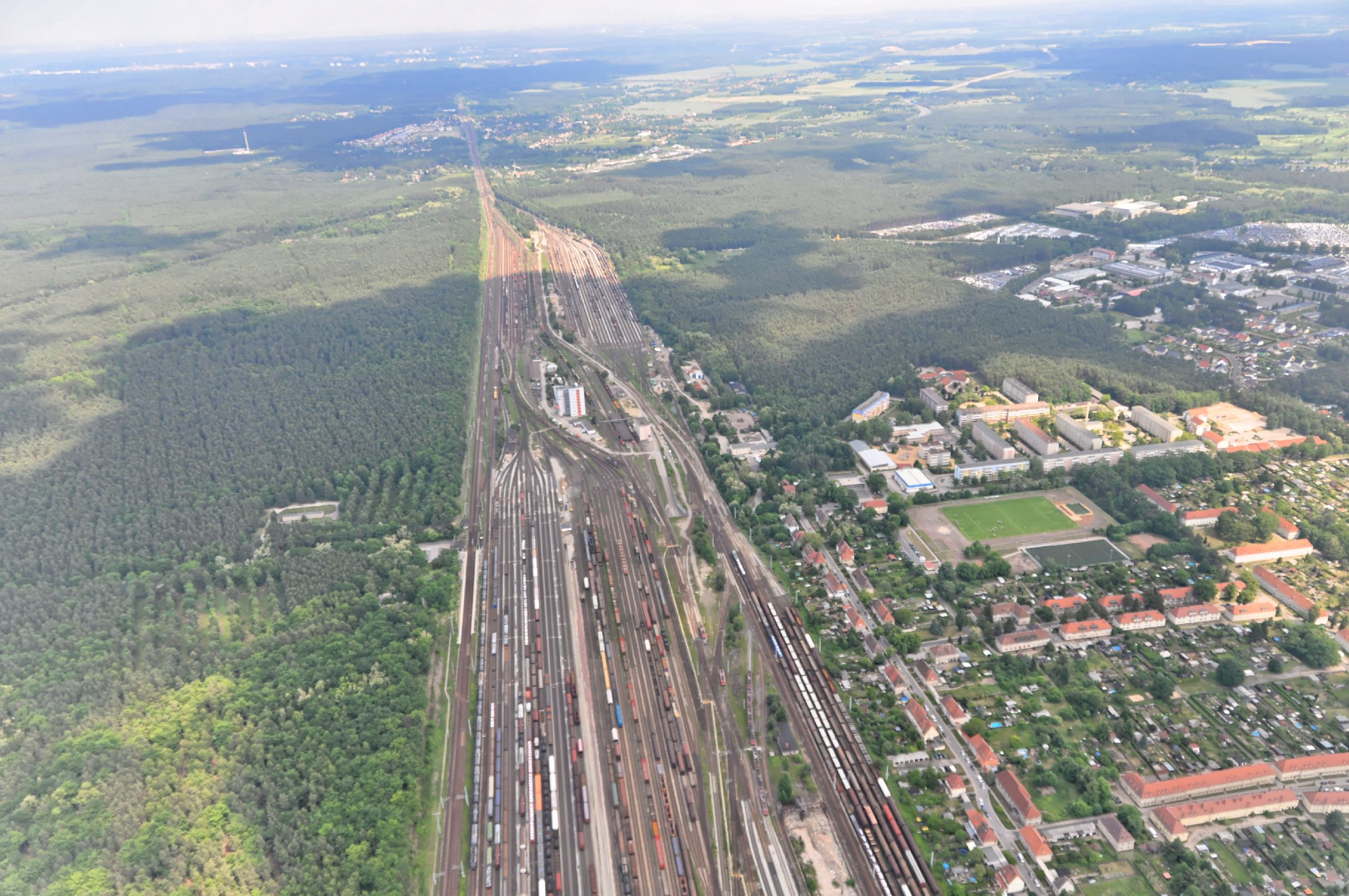
Seddin station out of the air seen (June 2013).
