= Beelitz =

- Town
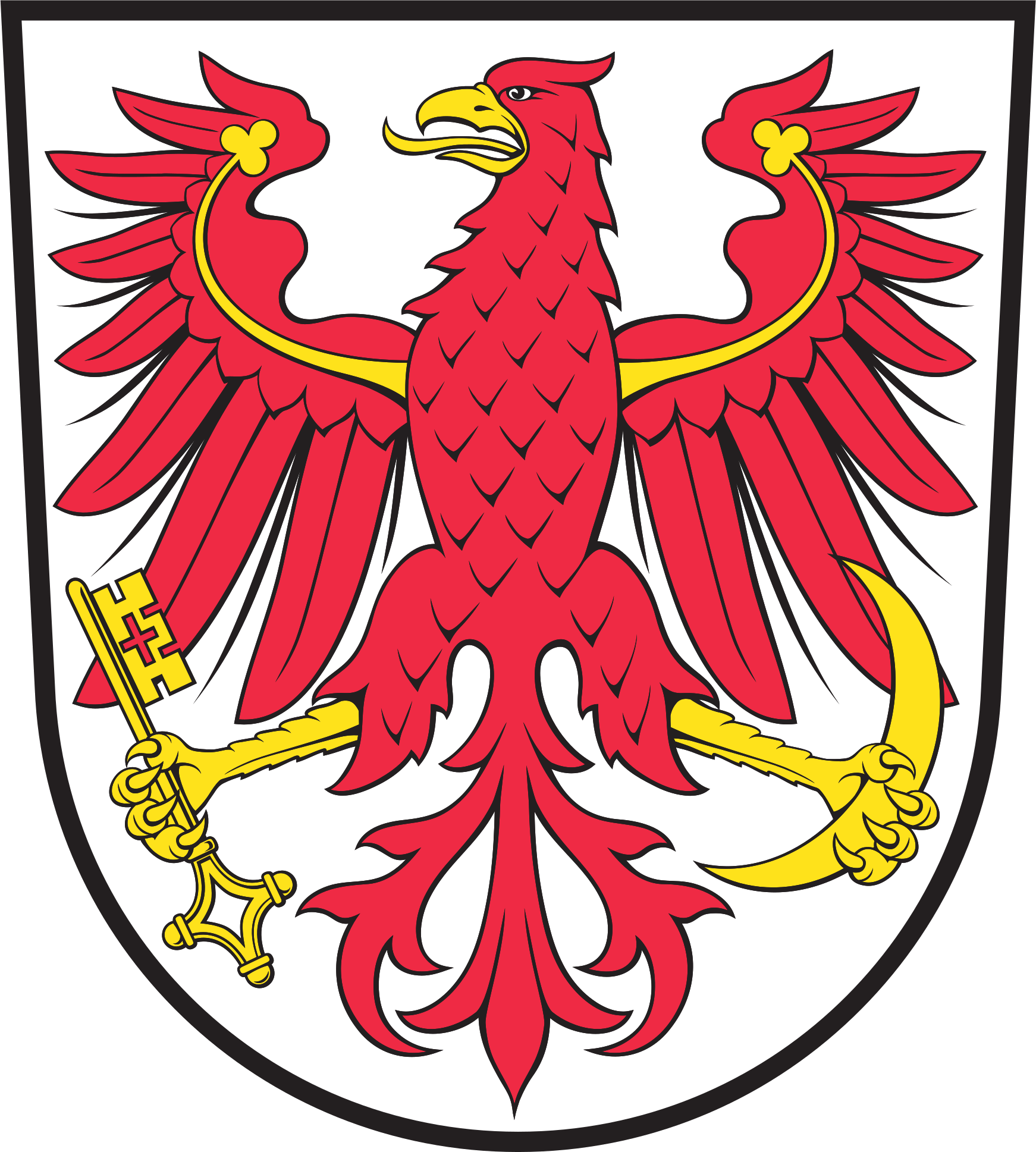
- Coat of arms

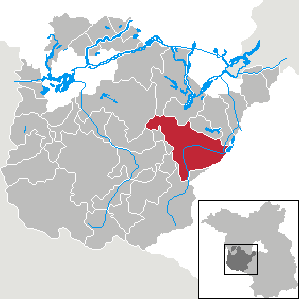
- Location of Beelitz within Potsdam-Mittelmark district
- Interactive map of Beelitz
- Location within Germany Location within Brandenburg
- Coordinates: 52°14′16″N 12°58′07″E
- Country: Germany
- State: Brandenburg
- District: Potsdam-Mittelmark
- Subdivisions: 12 Ortsteile

Government
  - Mayor (2018–26): Bernhard Knuth

Area
  - Total: 181.3 km^{2} (70.0 sq mi)
- Elevation: 40 m (130 ft)

Population (2025-12-31)
  - Total: 14,102
  - Density: 77.78/km^{2} (201.5/sq mi)
- Time zone: UTC+01:00 (CET)
  - Summer (DST): UTC+02:00 (CEST)
- Postal codes: 14547
- Dialling codes: 033204
- Vehicle registration: PM
- Website: www.beelitz.de

Beelitz (German pronunciation: [ˈbeːlɪts]) is a historic town in Potsdam-Mittelmark district, in Brandenburg, Germany. It is chiefly known for its cultivation of white asparagus (Beelitzer Spargel).

== Geography ==
Beelitz is situated about 18 km (11 mi) south of Potsdam, on the rim of the Zauche glacial sandur plain. The town is surrounded by extended pine woods of the Nuthe-Nieplitz Nature Park.

Located on an old trade route from Berlin to Leipzig, today the Bundesstraße 2, it also has access to the Bundesautobahn 9 at the Beelitz-Heilstätten and Beelitz junctions. Train service to Potsdam and Berlin via the Berlin-Blankenheim railway line is available at Beelitz Stadt and Beelitz-Heilstätten stations.

== History ==
A 997 deed by Emperor Otto III mentions a settlement with the Slavic name Belizi, though this denotation may also refer to the nearby town of Belzig.

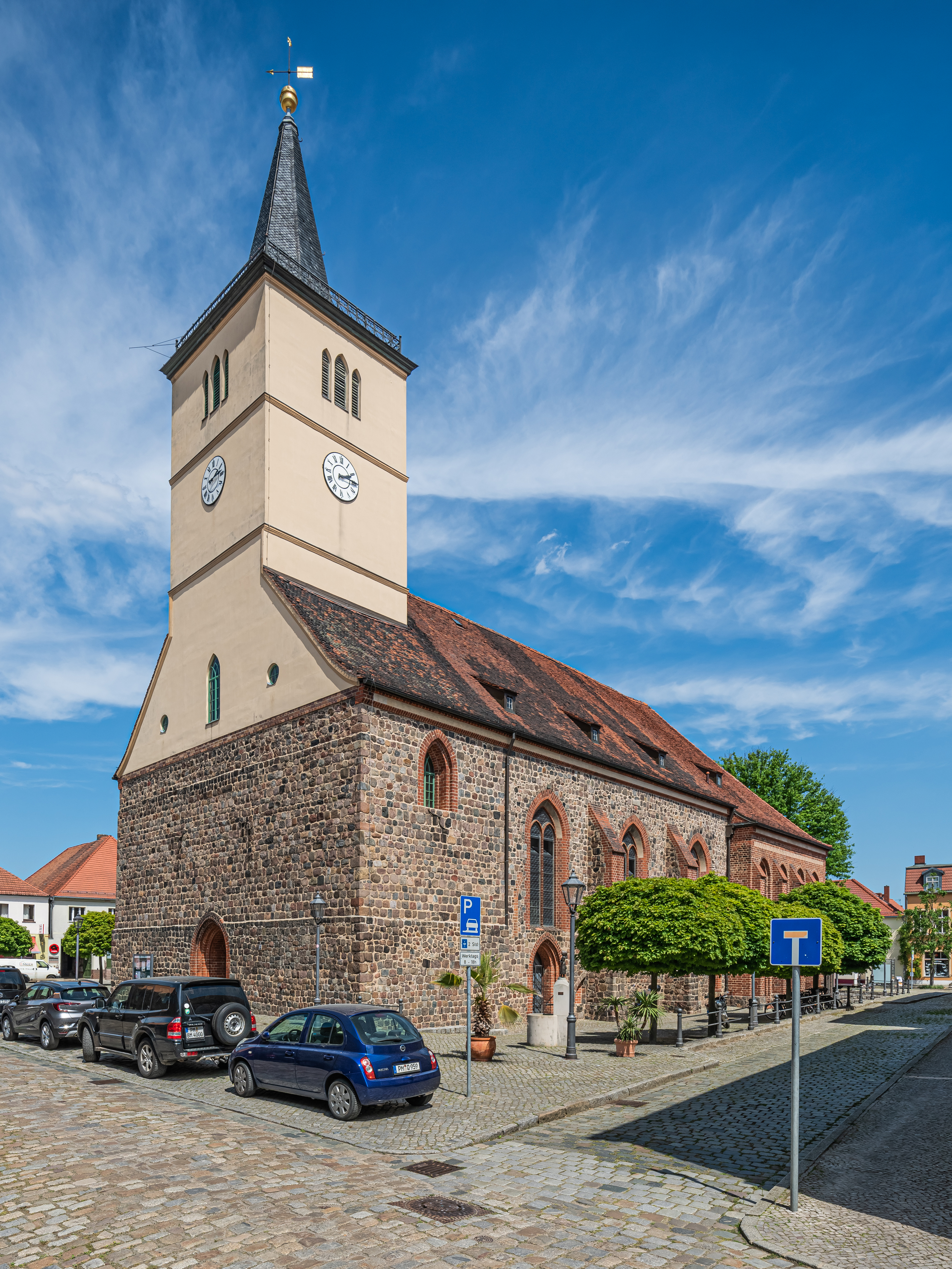
Saints Mary and Nicholas

The Saint Mary and Saint Nicholas parish church was first mentioned in a 1247 report of a Jewish host desecration, and bleeding host miracle, that made Beelitz a medieval pilgrimage site. Since 1370 the host was kept in a small chapel adjacent to the church. The reason for the former name of the Judenberg (renamed Friedensberg after 1945) before the Mühlentor is not confirmed, though tradition indicates it was the site of the burning of Jews.

Map of Beelitz (c. 1770)

When in 1731 King Frederick William I of Prussia billeted a hussar regiment, Beelitz became a garrison town and today is home to a Bundeswehr command. The cultivation of asparagus was first documented in 1861.

The village of Kanin, a subdivision of Beelitz since 2001, had been an exclave of the Electorate of Saxony until 1815 and therefore a notorious smuggling area as well as a destination for deserters from the Prussian army. Its fieldstone church was erected about 1138 and today is the oldest preserved one within the Brandenburg state.

In 1928, the Telefunken company erected a radio station in the subdivision of Schönefeld for the wireless communication with North America. Together with the Nauen Transmitter Station, it was incorporated by the Reichspost in 1932. After World War II, the station was used by the Deutsche Post of the GDR until it finally went out of service in 1991.

=== Demography ===
Development of the population since 1875 within the current boundaries (Blue Line: Population; Dotted Line: Comparison to Population development in Brandenburg state; Grey Background: Time of Nazi Germany; Red Background: Time of communist East Germany)

Recent Population Development and Projections (Population Development before Census 2011 (blue line); Recent Population Development according to the Census in Germany in 2011 (blue bordered line); Official projections for 2005-2030 (yellow line); for 2017-2030 (scarlet line); for 2020-2030 (green line)

Beelitz: Population development
within the current boundaries (2020)

Year	Pop.	±% p.a.
1875	6,427	—
1890	6,865	+0.44%
1910	8,900	+1.31%
1925	9,126	+0.17%
1939	10,167	+0.77%
1950	11,788	+1.35%
1964	9,918	−1.23%

Year	Pop.	±% p.a.
1971	9,764	−0.22%
1981	8,901	−0.92%
1985	9,593	+1.89%
1990	9,826	+0.48%
1995	10,350	+1.04%
2000	12,219	+3.38%
2005	12,318	+0.16%

Year	Pop.	±% p.a.
2010	11,900	−0.69%
2015	12,121	+0.37%
2016	12,166	+0.37%
2017	12,175	+0.07%
2018	12,448	+2.24%
2019	12,652	+1.64%
2020	12,818	+1.31%

== Beelitz-Heilstätten ==
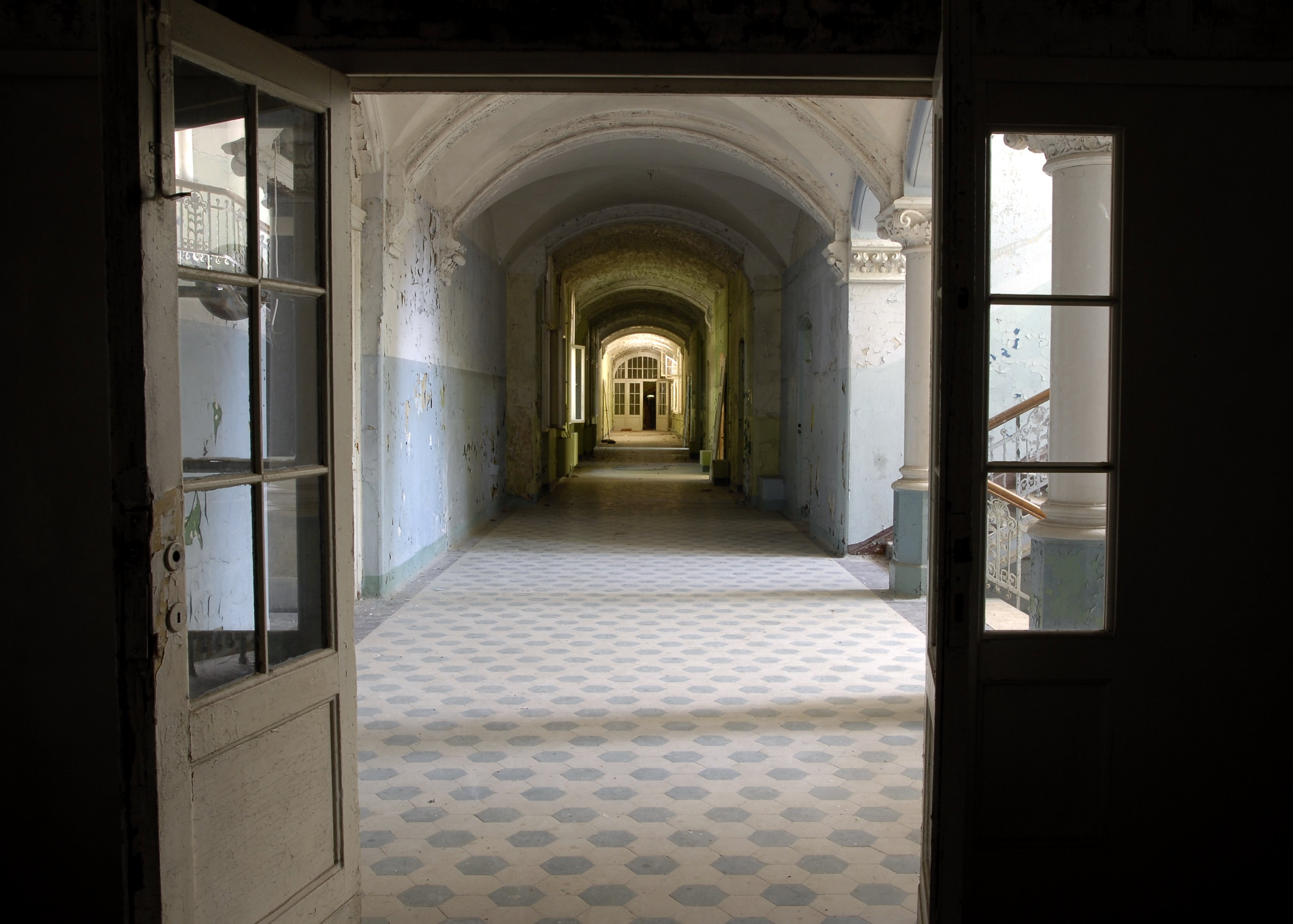
Beelitz-Heilstätten: hallway, 2005 condition

Beelitz-Heilstätten, a district of the town, is home to a large hospital complex of about 60 buildings including a cogeneration plant erected in 1898 according to the plans of architect Heino Schmieden. Originally designed as a sanatorium by the Berlin workers' health insurance corporation, the complex from the beginning of World War I on was a military hospital of the Imperial German Army. During October and November 1916, Adolf Hitler recuperated at Beelitz-Heilstätten after being wounded in the leg at the Battle of the Somme.

During World War II there was a new military hospital complex built by architect Egon Eiermann. It is now used as a Parkinsons clinic.

In 1945, Beelitz-Heilstätten was occupied by Red Army forces, and the complex remained a Soviet military hospital until 1994, well after the German reunification. In December 1990, Erich Honecker was admitted to Beelitz-Heilstätten after being forced to resign as the head of the East German government.

Following the Soviet withdrawal, several attempts were made to privatise the complex, but they were not entirely successful. Some sections of the hospital remain in operation as a neurological rehabilitation centre and a centre for research and care for victims of Parkinson's disease. The remainder of the complex, including the surgery, the psychiatric ward, and a rifle range, was abandoned in 1994. In the mid-2010s large parts of the buildings were restored which was followed by the population being quadrupled.

== In popular culture ==
The hospital complex has made Beelitz-Heilstätten a destination for curious visitors and a film set for films like The Pianist in 2002, the Rammstein music video "Mein Herz brennt", the films Valkyrie in 2008, Men & Chicken in 2015, A Cure for Wellness in 2016, and the Netflix series 1899 in 2022.

Beelitz-Heilstätten is a popular location for urban exploration, providing a photographic subject for artistic photography.

Former sanatorium for consumptives

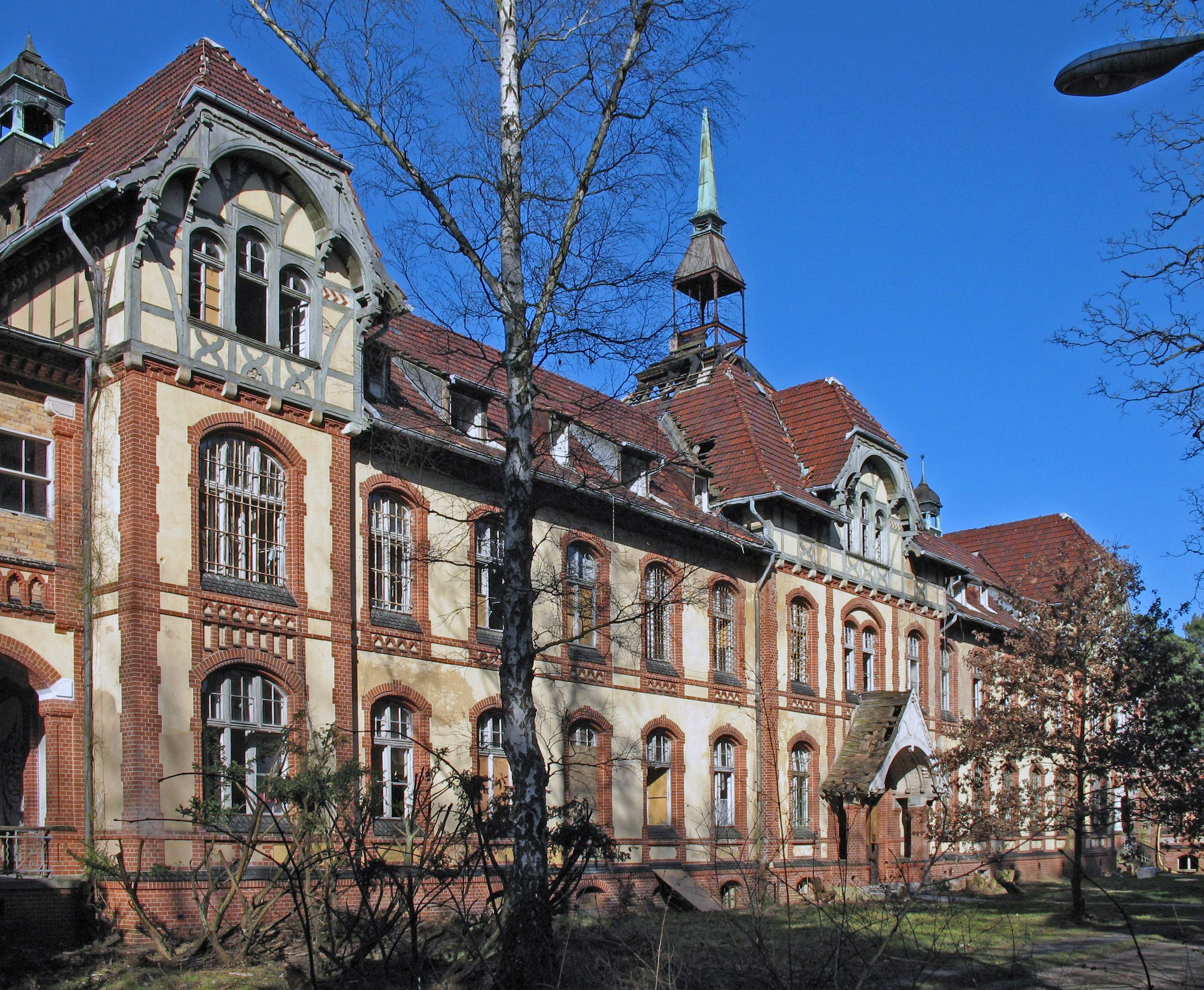
Pavilion B II

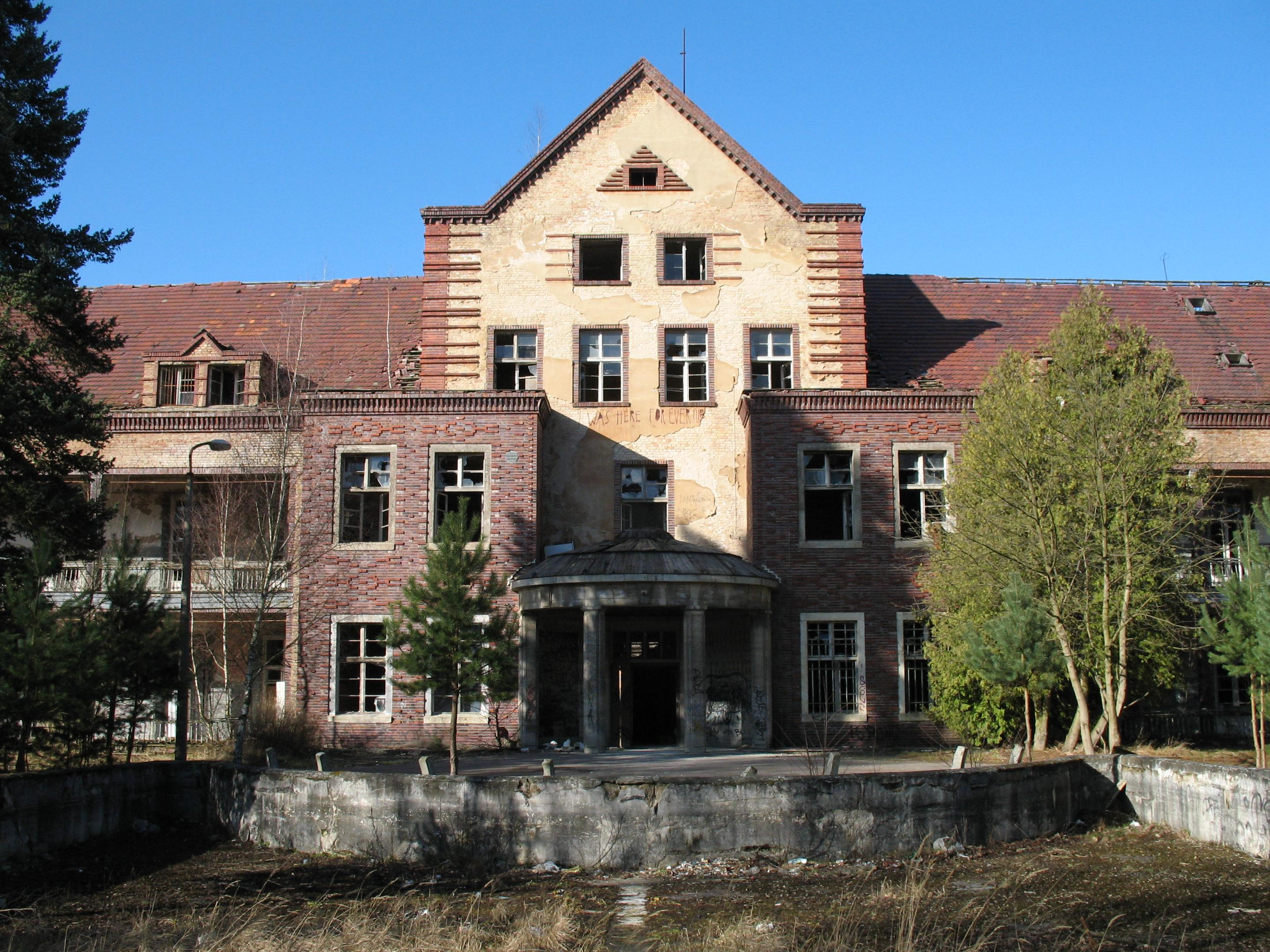
Surgery Pavilion

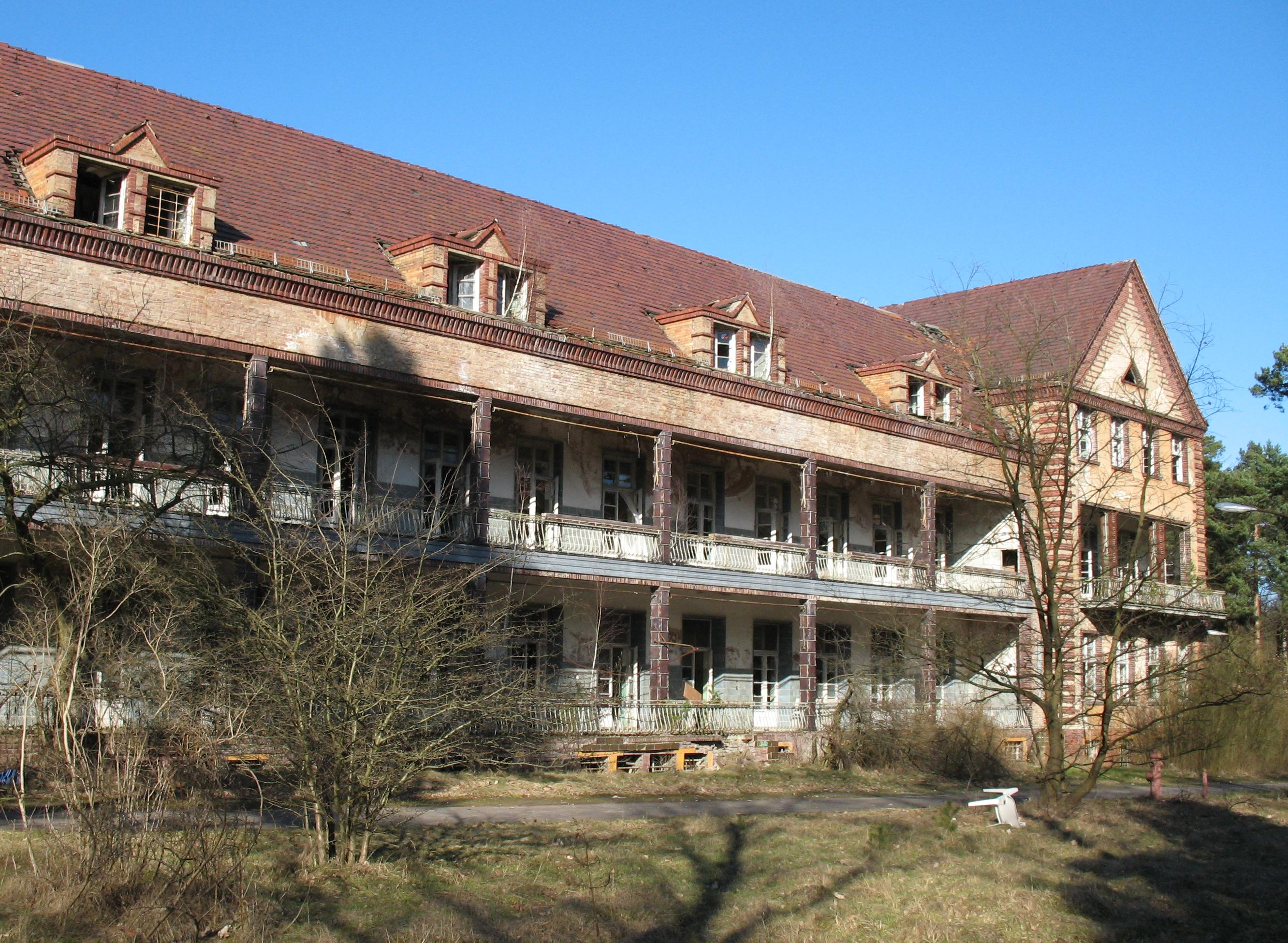
Surgery Pavilion

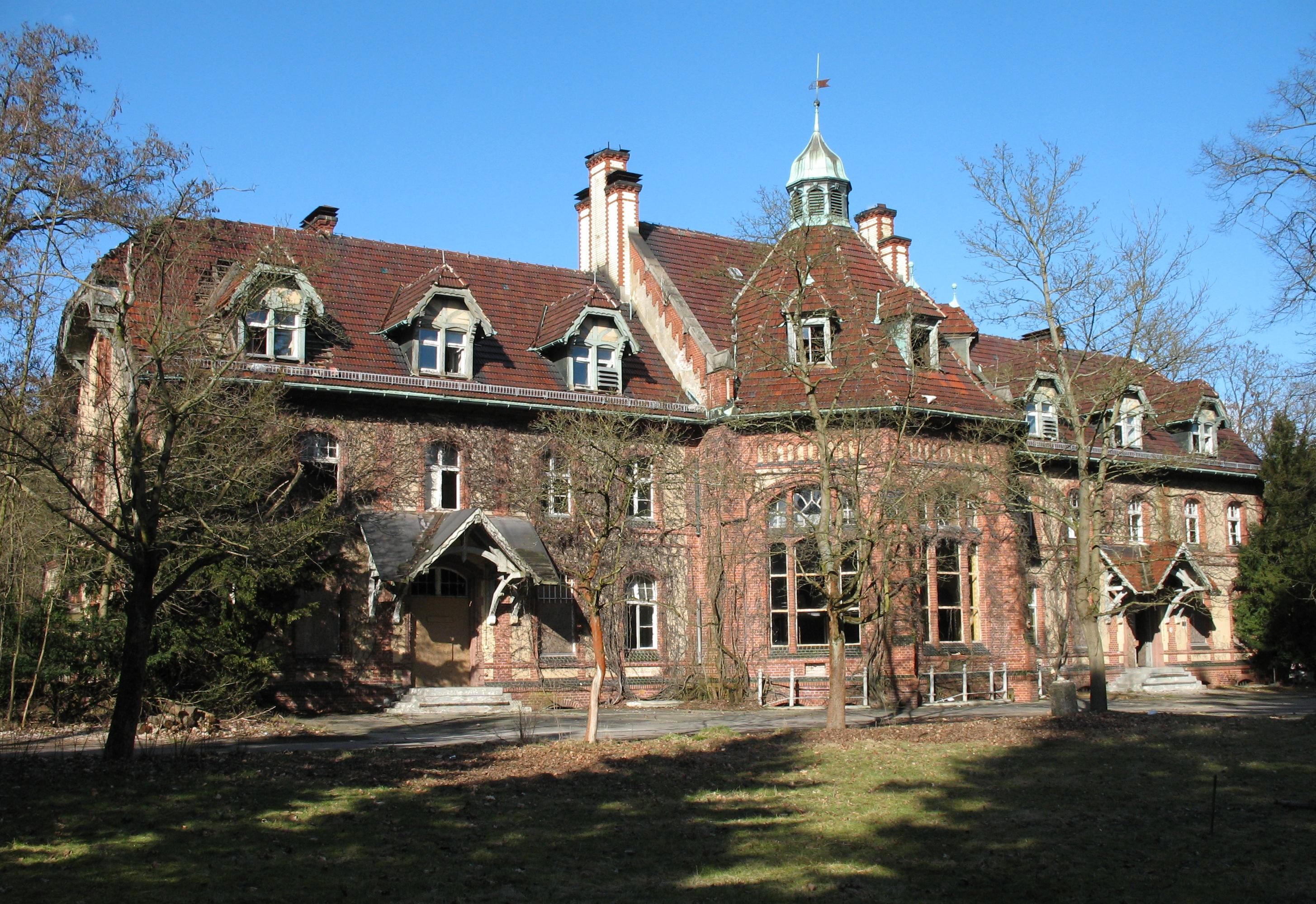
Kitchen

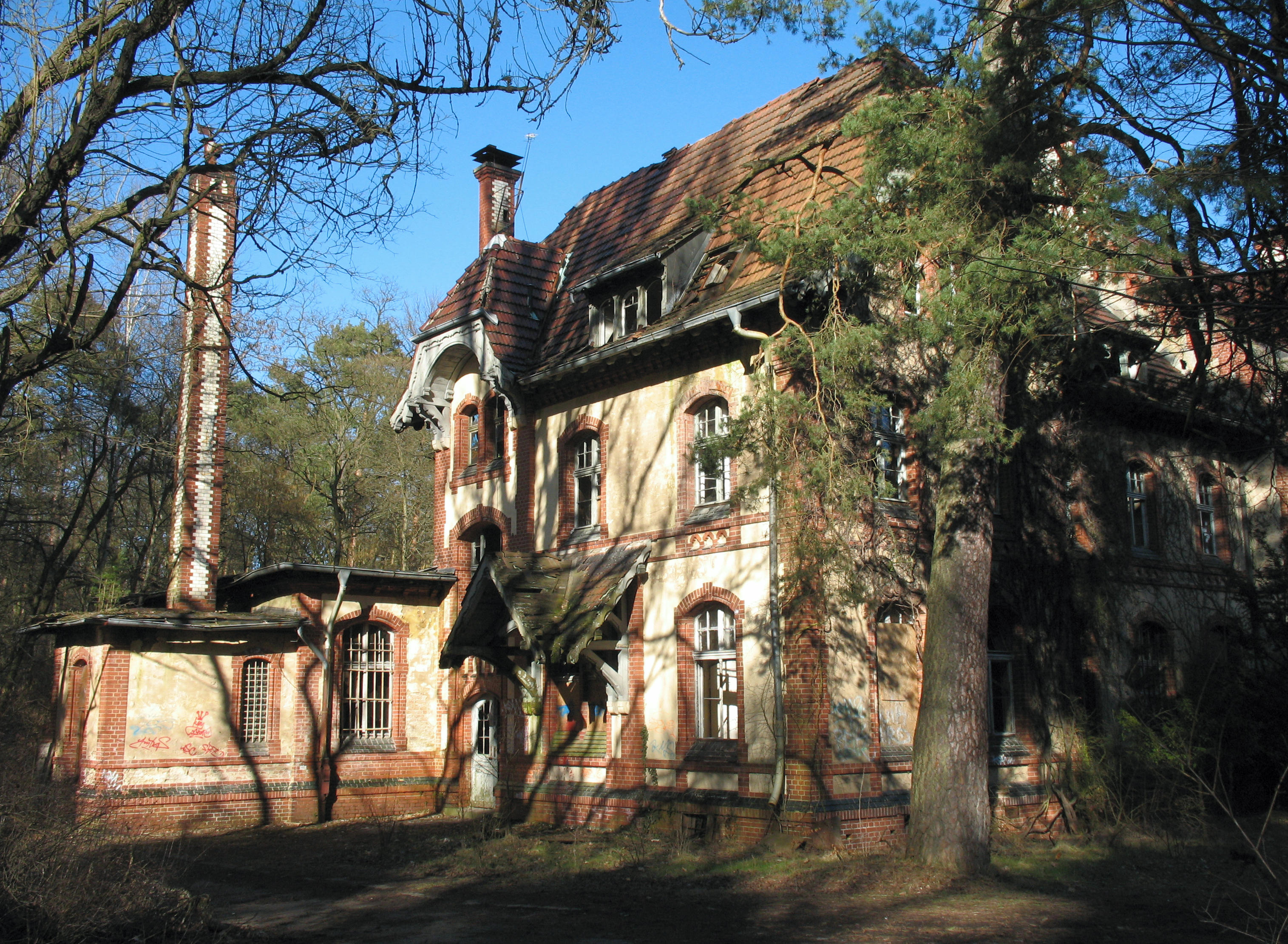
Washhouse

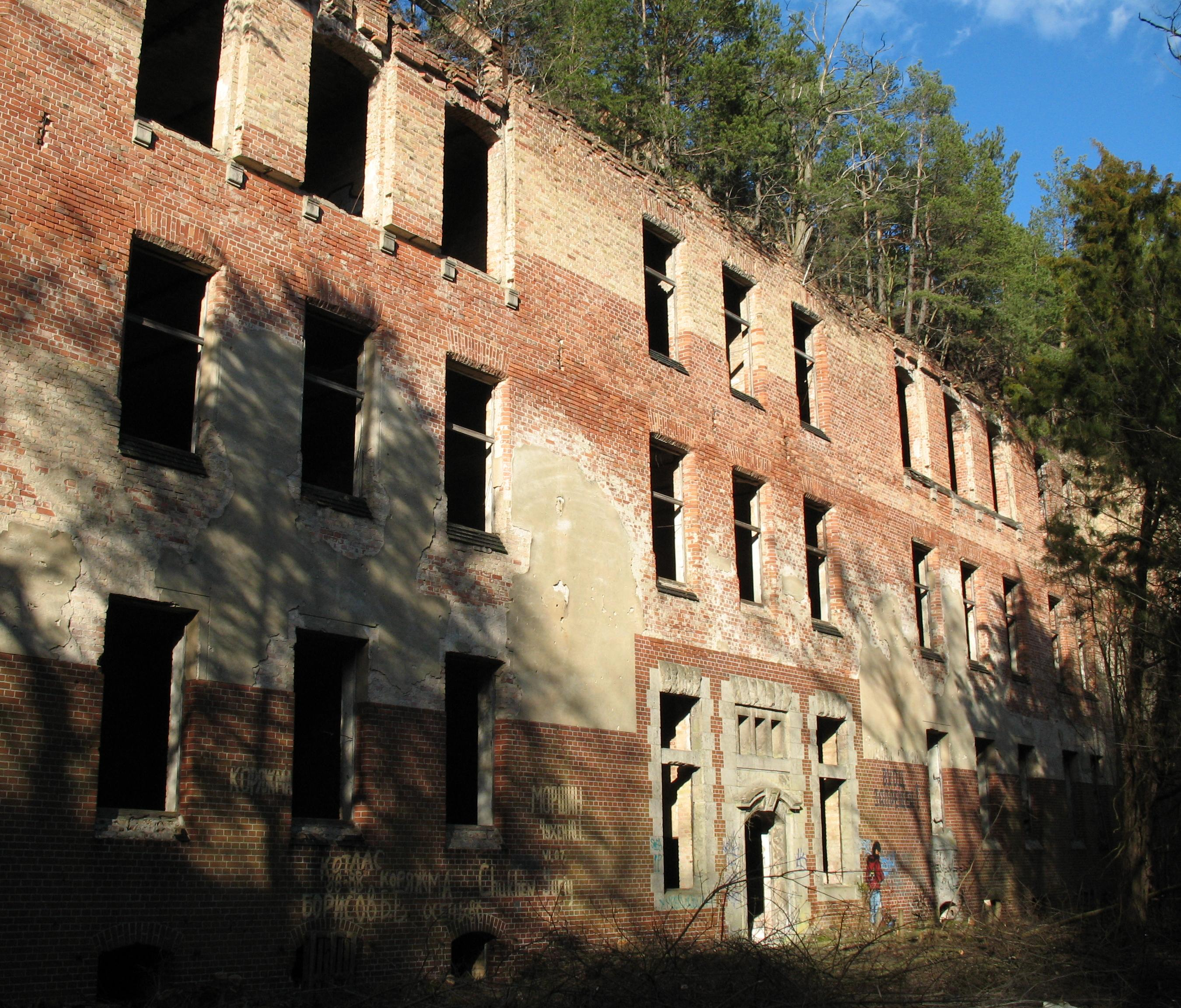
Pavilion B IV

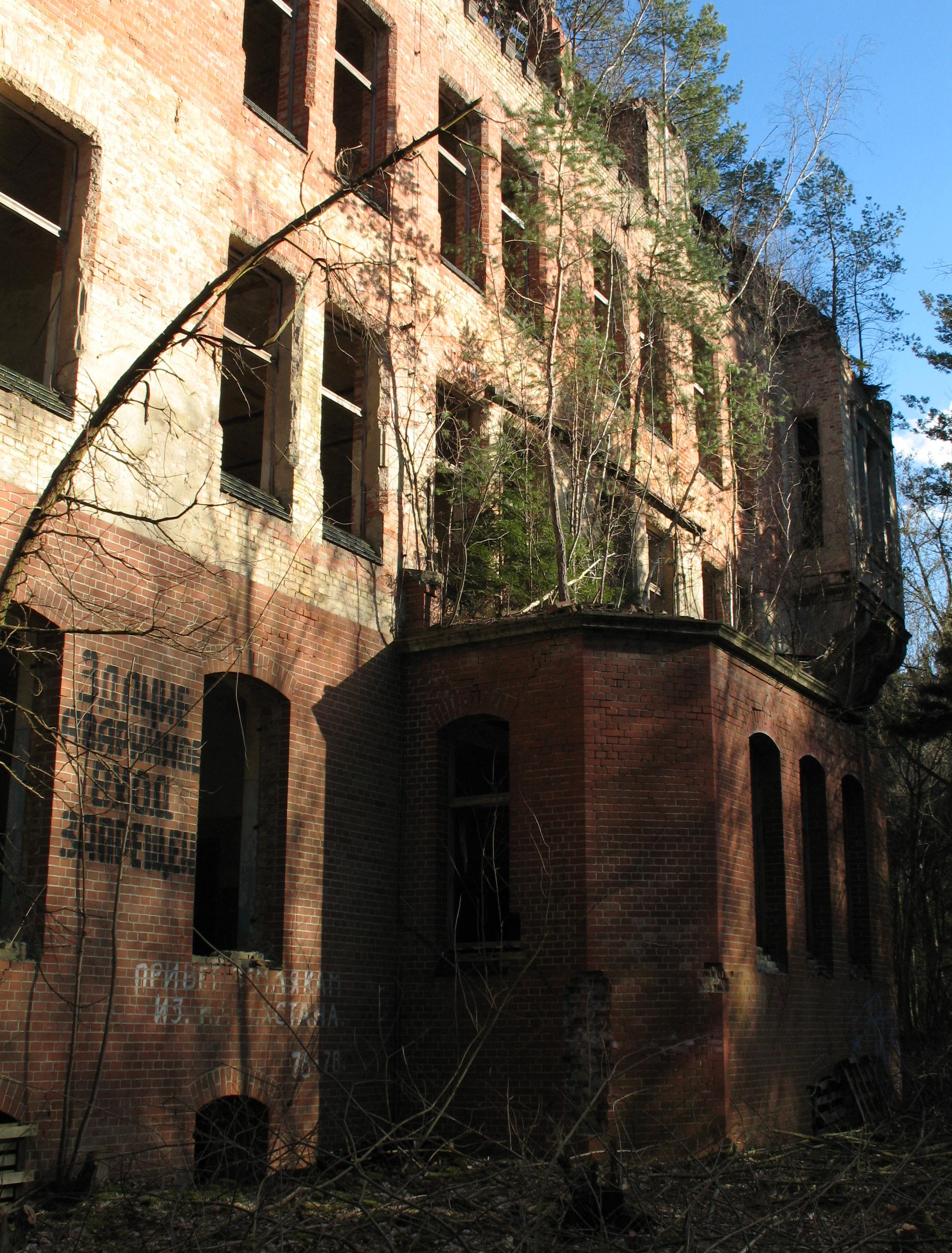
Pavilion B IV

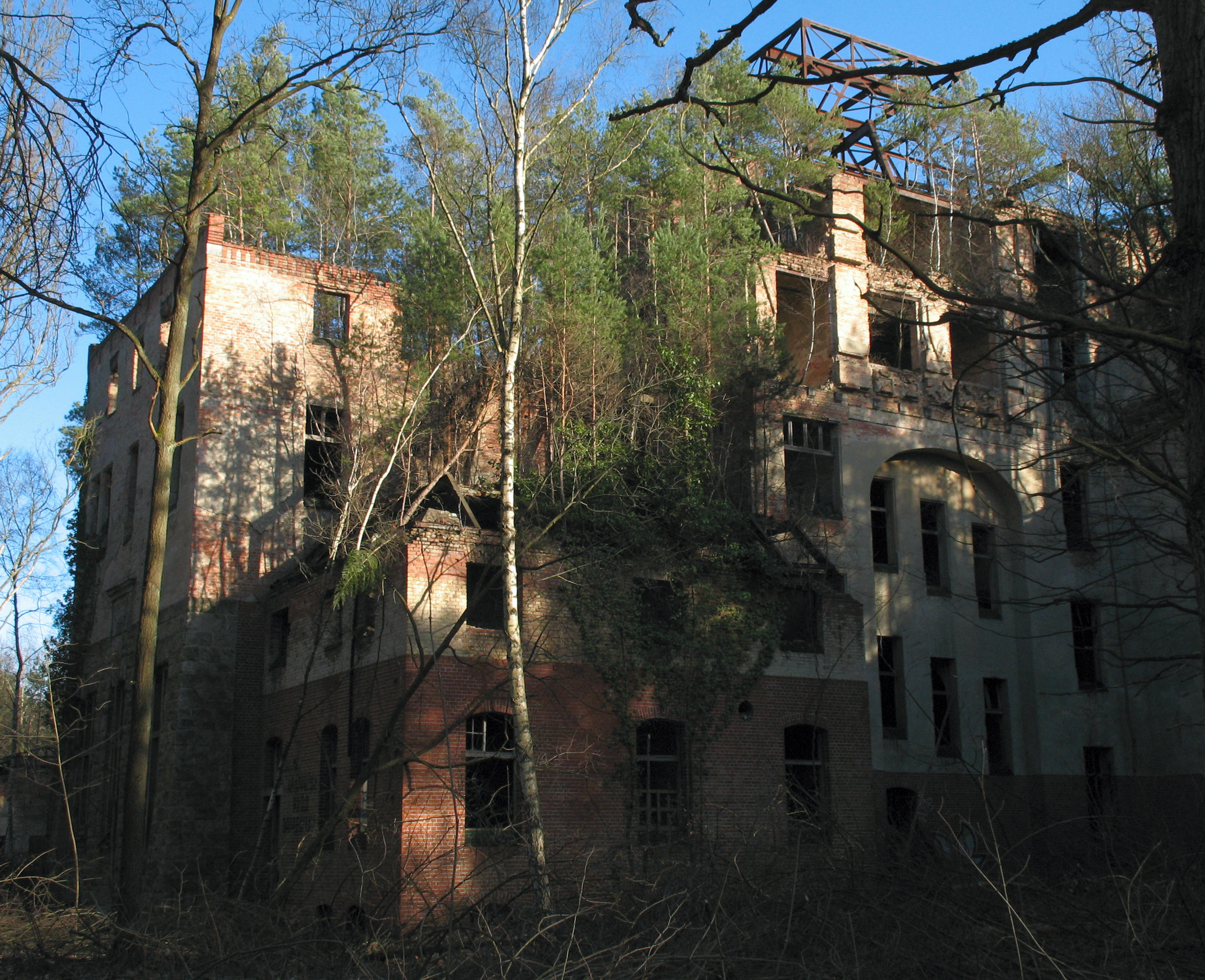
Pavilion B IV

== International relations ==
Beelitz is twinned with:

- Ratingen, North Rhine-Westphalia since 1990
- Alfter, North Rhine-Westphalia

== Personalities ==
=== Sons and daughters of the city ===
- Götz Dieter Plage (1936–1993), nature film–maker
- Falko Steinke (born 1985), volleyball player

=== People connected to the city ===
- Sally Bein (1881 – after June 1, 1942), teacher, head of the Jewish home for children with special needs
- Wolfgang Schmidt (born 1966), serial killer, also known as "Rosa Riese"

== See also ==
- Riebener See
