= Barnim II (electoral district) =

State electoral district of Germany

14: Barnim II
- Electoral district for the Landtag of Brandenburg
- Barnim II in 2024
- District: Barnim
- Electorate: 52,862 (2024)
- Major settlements: Bernau bei Berlin

Current electoral district
- Created: 1994
- Party: AfD
- Member: John Steffen

Barnim II is an electoral constituency (German: Wahlkreis) represented in the Landtag of Brandenburg. It elects one member via first-past-the-post voting. Under the constituency numbering system, it is designated as constituency 14. It is located in the Barnim district.

== Geography ==
The constituency includes the town of Bernau bei Berlin, as well as the municipality of Panketal.

There were 52,862 eligible voters in 2024.

== Members ==
Election	Member	Party	%
2004	Dagmar Enkelmann	PDS	39.3
2009	Ralf Christoffers	Left	34.7
2014	Britta Stark	SPD	27.4
2019	Péter Vida	BVB/FW	24.0
2024	Steffen John	AfD	26.3

== Election results ==
=== 2024 election ===
State election (2024): Barnim I
Notes:	Blue background denotes the winner of the electorate vote. Pink background denotes a candidate elected from their party list. Yellow background denotes an electorate win by a list member, or other incumbent. A ✓ or ✗ denotes status of any incumbent, win or lose respectively.						
Party	Candidate	Votes	%	±%	Party votes	%	±%
AfD	Steffen John	10,289	26.3	▲9.4	9,658	24.6	▲5.2
SPD	Martina Maxi Schmidt	9,437	24.1	▲2.4	11,218	28.6	▲7.3
BSW					5,810	14.8	
BVB/FW	✗ Péter Vida	9,357	23.9	Steady	3,461	8.8	▼6.7
CDU	Grosche	4,865	12.4	▲2.1	4,083	10.4	▼1.0
Left	Holz	2,997	7.7	▼7.6	1,584	4.0	▼10.5
Greens	Brecht-Hadraschek	1,359	3.5	▼4.5	1,629	4.1	▼6.9
Tierschutzpartei					822	2.1	▼0.4
Plus					494	1.3	▼0.3
FDP	Donat	337	0.9	▼1.1	278	0.7	▼1.9
Independent	Link	254	0.6				
dieBasis	Brendel	193	0.5				
Values					92	0.2	
DLW					83	0.2	
Third Way					37	0.1	
DKP					30	0.1	
Informal votes		473			282		
Total valid votes		39,088			39,279		
Turnout		39,561	74.8	▲13.4			
AfD gain from BVB/FW	Majority	852	2.2				

=== 2019 election ===
State election (2019): Barnim II
Notes:	Blue background denotes the winner of the electorate vote. Pink background denotes a candidate elected from their party list. Yellow background denotes an electorate win by a list member, or other incumbent. A ✓ or ✗ denotes status of any incumbent, win or lose respectively.						
Party	Candidate	Votes	%	±%	Party votes	%	±%
BVB/FW	Péter Vida	7,318	24.0	▲14.2	4,736	15.5	▲8.1
SPD	✗ Britta Stark	6,653	21.8	▼5.6	6,496	21.3	▼5.9
AfD	Hans Link	5,185	17.0	▲8.6	5,937	19.4	▲8.4
Left	Ralf Christoffers	4,663	15.3	▼12.1	4,444	14.5	▼11.0
CDU	Daniel Sauer	3,164	10.4	▼7.9	3,482	11.4	▼6.4
Greens	Danilo Zoschnik	2,424	7.9	▲2.0	3,367	11.0	▲4.6
FDP	Renate Prauß	612	2.0	▲1.2	787	2.6	▲1.6
Tierschutzpartei					750	2.5	
Die PARTEI	Mario Schlauß	536	1.8				
Pirates					325	1.1	▼0.5
ÖDP					143	0.5	
V-Partei3					78	0.3	
Informal votes		302			312		
Total valid votes		30,555			30,545		
Turnout		30,857	61.4	▲11.1			
BVB/FW gain from SPD	Majority	665	2.2				

=== 2014 election ===
State election (2014): Barnim II
Notes:	Blue background denotes the winner of the electorate vote. Pink background denotes a candidate elected from their party list. Yellow background denotes an electorate win by a list member, or other incumbent. A ✓ or ✗ denotes status of any incumbent, win or lose respectively.						
Party	Candidate	Votes	%	±%	Party votes	%	±%
SPD	Britta Stark	6,512	27.5	▼0.5	6,453	27.2	▼0.7
Left	✗ Ralf Christoffers	6,504	27.4	▼7.3	6,054	25.5	▼8.4
CDU	Uwe Bartsch	4,353	18.3	▼0.9	4,226	17.8	▲0.6
BVB/FW	Péter Vida	2,338	9.8	▲5.6	1,749	7.4	▲4.5
AfD	Joachim Schaaf	1,994	8.4		2,603	11.0	
Greens	Stefan Stahlbaum	1,407	5.9	▼0.5	1,508	6.4	▼0.3
NPD	Aileen Rokohl	462	1.9	▼0.8	424	1.8	▼0.6
Pirates					371	1.6	
FDP	Harro Semmler	195	0.8	▼4.1	241	1.0	▼5.2
DKP					67	0.3	Steady
REP					35	0.1	▼0.2
Informal votes		423			457		
Total valid votes		23,765			23,731		
Turnout		24,188	50.3	▼18.5			
SPD gain from Left	Majority	8	0.0				

=== 2009 election ===
State election (2009): Barnim II
Notes:	Blue background denotes the winner of the electorate vote. Pink background denotes a candidate elected from their party list. Yellow background denotes an electorate win by a list member, or other incumbent. A ✓ or ✗ denotes status of any incumbent, win or lose respectively.						
Party	Candidate	Votes	%	±%	Party votes	%	±%
Left	Ralf Christoffers	10,904	34.7	▼4.6	10,691	33.9	▼0.8
SPD	Britta Stark	8,745	27.9	▲3.5	8,814	27.9	▼0.5
CDU	Sabine Friehe	6,028	19.2	▲1.7	5,442	17.2	▲0.8
Greens	Stefan Stahlbaum	2,015	6.4	▲2.8	2,114	6.7	▲2.4
FDP	Peter Pick	1,535	4.9	▲3.0	1,971	6.2	▲3.9
BVB/FW	Peter Vida	1,313	4.2		900	2.9	
NPD	Pierre Dornbrach	860	2.7		758	2.4	
DVU					273	0.9	▼3.8
50Plus					206	0.7	▲0.2
RRP					166	0.5	
REP					86	0.3	
DKP					84	0.3	Steady
Die-Volksinitiative					65	0.2	
Informal votes		847			677		
Total valid votes		31,400			31,570		
Turnout		32,247	68.8	▲11.2			
Left hold	Majority	2,159	6.8	▼8.1			

=== 2004 election ===
State election (2004): Barnim II
Notes:	Blue background denotes the winner of the electorate vote. Pink background denotes a candidate elected from their party list. Yellow background denotes an electorate win by a list member, or other incumbent. A ✓ or ✗ denotes status of any incumbent, win or lose respectively.						
Party	Candidate	Votes	%	±%	Party votes	%	±%
PDS	Dagmar Enkelmann	9,635	39.31		8,531	34.70	
SPD	Britta Stark	5,985	24.42		6,973	28.36	
CDU	Uwe Bartsch	4,290	17.50		4,039	16.43	
DVU					1,149	4.67	
BRB	Dirk Weßlau	2,445	9.98		795	3.23	
Greens	Heinz-Joachim Bona	886	3.61		1,056	4.30	
FDP	Gerburg Pietschmann	475	1.94		575	2.34	
Familie					531	2.16	
Schill	Peter Mauritz	430	1.75		102	0.41	
AfW (Free Voters)	Rol Zimmermann	363	1.48		102	0.41	
Gray Panthers					357	1.45	
50Plus					123	0.50	
AUB-Brandenburg					87	0.35	
DKP					85	0.35	
Yes Brandenburg					80	0.33	
Informal votes		639			563		
Total valid votes		24,509			24,585		
Turnout		25,148	57.56				
PDS win new seat	Majority	3,650	14.89				

== See also ==
- Politics of Brandenburg
- Landtag of Brandenburg
