= Oberhavel II =

State electoral district of Germany

8: Oberhavel II
- Electoral district for the Landtag of Brandenburg
- Oberhavel II in 2024
- District: Oberhavel
- Electorate: 51,556 (2024)
- Major settlements: Hohen Neuendorf

Current electoral district
- Created: 1994
- Party: SPD
- Member: Benjamin Grimm

Oberhavel II is an electoral constituency (German: Wahlkreis) represented in the Landtag of Brandenburg. It elects one member via first-past-the-post voting. Under the constituency numbering system, it is designated as constituency 8. It is located in the Oberhavel district.

== Geography ==
The constituency includes the town of Hohen Neuendorf, as well as the communities of Mühlenbecker Land, Birkenwerder, and Glienicke/Nordbahn.

There were 51,556 eligible voters in 2024.

== Members ==
| Election | Member | Party | % |
|---|---|---|---|
| 2004 | Alwin Ziel | SPD | 31.7 |
| 2009 | Alwin Ziel | SPD | 29.4 |
| 2014 | Inka Gossmann-Reetz | SPD | 30.1 |
| 2019 | Inka Gossmann-Reetz | SPD | 24.1 |
| 2024 | Benjamin Grimm | SPD | 37.0 |

== Election results ==
=== 2024 election ===
State election (2024): Oberhavel II
| Notes: | Blue background denotes the winner of the electorate vote. Pink background denotes a candidate elected from their party list. Yellow background denotes an electorate win by a list member, or other incumbent. A ✓ or ✗ denotes status of any incumbent, win or lose respectively. | | | | | | |
| Party | Candidate | Votes | % | ±% | Party votes | % | ±% |
|---|---|---|---|---|---|---|---|
| SPD | Benjamin Grimm | 14,824 | 37.0 | ▲12.9 | 13,853 | 34.4 | ▲9.6 |
| AfD | Yvonne Prause | 9,321 | 23.2 | ▲5.5 | 8,497 | 21.2 | ▲3.7 |
| CDU | Hübner | 8,843 | 22.0 | ▲1.2 | 7,073 | 17.5 | ▼0.9 |
| BSW | | | | | 4,326 | 10.7 | |
| Greens | von Gizycki | 2,151 | 5.4 | ▼12.3 | 2,607 | 6.5 | ▼11.4 |
| Tierschutzpartei | | | | | 944 | 2.3 | ▼1.2 |
| BVB/FW | Lindenberg | 1,789 | 4.5 | ▲0.1 | 673 | 1.7 | ▼1.8 |
| Left | Usée | 1,433 | 3.6 | ▼4.6 | 918 | 2.3 | ▼5.9 |
| Plus | Bennühr | 994 | 2.5 | ▲1.3 | 583 | 1.4 | Steady |
| FDP | Tiedemann | 755 | 1.9 | ▼2.1 | 551 | 1.4 | ▼3.3 |
| Values | | | | | 140 | 0.3 | |
| DLW | | | | | 96 | 0.2 | |
| Third Way | | | | | 29 | 0.1 | |
| DKP | | | | | 21 | 0.1 | |
| Informal votes | | 454 | | | 253 | | |
| Total valid votes | | 40,110 | | | 40,311 | | |
| Turnout | | 40,564 | 78.7 | ▲9.1 | | | |
| SPD hold | Majority | 5,503 | 13.8 | ▲7.5 | | | |

=== 2019 election ===
State election (2019): Oberhavel II
| Notes: | Blue background denotes the winner of the electorate vote. Pink background denotes a candidate elected from their party list. Yellow background denotes an electorate win by a list member, or other incumbent. A ✓ or ✗ denotes status of any incumbent, win or lose respectively. | | | | | | |
| Party | Candidate | Votes | % | ±% | Party votes | % | ±% |
|---|---|---|---|---|---|---|---|
| SPD | ✓ Inka Gossmann-Reetz | 8,402 | 24.1 | ▼6.0 | 8,649 | 24.8 | ▼4.8 |
| CDU | Roger Pautz | 7,282 | 20.9 | ▼7.9 | 6,447 | 18.5 | ▼7.4 |
| AfD | Dr. Daniela Oeynhausen | 6,178 | 17.7 | ▲7.1 | 6,076 | 17.4 | ▲5.5 |
| Greens | Julia Schmidt | 6,160 | 17.7 | ▲8.3 | 6,232 | 17.8 | ▲7.3 |
| Left | Vadim Reimer | 2,834 | 8.1 | ▼8.0 | 2,856 | 8.2 | ▼7.0 |
| Tierschutzpartei | | | | | 1,250 | 3.6 | |
| BVB/FW | Werner Lindenberg | 1,538 | 4.4 | ▲1.5 | 1,221 | 3.5 | ▲1.9 |
| FDP | Jörg Rathmer | 1,395 | 4.0 | ▲2.0 | 1,619 | 4.6 | ▲2.6 |
| Die PARTEI | Jessica Schulz | 692 | 2.0 | | | | |
| Pirates | Thomas Bennühr | 404 | 1.2 | | 305 | 0.9 | ▼0.8 |
| ÖDP | | | | | 194 | 0.6 | |
| V-Partei3 | | | | | 75 | 0.2 | |
| Informal votes | | 363 | | | 324 | | |
| Total valid votes | | 34,885 | | | 34,924 | | |
| Turnout | | 35,248 | 69.5 | ▲15.9 | | | |
| SPD hold | Majority | 1,120 | 3.2 | ▲1.9 | | | |

=== 2014 election ===
State election (2014): Oberhavel II
| Notes: | Blue background denotes the winner of the electorate vote. Pink background denotes a candidate elected from their party list. Yellow background denotes an electorate win by a list member, or other incumbent. A ✓ or ✗ denotes status of any incumbent, win or lose respectively. | | | | | | |
| Party | Candidate | Votes | % | ±% | Party votes | % | ±% |
|---|---|---|---|---|---|---|---|
| SPD | Inka Gossmann-Reetz | 7,737 | 30.1 | ▲1.4 | 7,616 | 29.6 | ▼0.8 |
| CDU | Michael Heider | 7,393 | 28.8 | ▲0.3 | 6,670 | 25.9 | ▲2.3 |
| Left | Lukas Lüdtke | 4,129 | 16.1 | ▼5.8 | 3,925 | 15.2 | ▼5.0 |
| AfD | Daniel Friese | 2,724 | 10.6 | | 3,076 | 11.9 | |
| Greens | Karsten Wundermann | 2,417 | 9.4 | ▲0.2 | 2,715 | 10.5 | ▲0.3 |
| BVB/FW | Werner Lindenberg | 749 | 2.9 | ▲0.7 | 416 | 1.6 | ▲0.1 |
| FDP | Florian Wöhrle | 526 | 2.0 | ▼5.3 | 514 | 2.0 | ▼7.9 |
| Pirates | | | | | 427 | 1.7 | |
| NPD | | | | | 311 | 1.2 | ▼0.7 |
| DKP | | | | | 46 | 0.2 | ▲0.1 |
| REP | | | | | 36 | 0.1 | ▼0.2 |
| Informal votes | | 317 | | | 240 | | |
| Total valid votes | | 25,675 | | | 25,752 | | |
| Turnout | | 25,992 | 53.6 | ▼24.1 | | | |
| SPD hold | Majority | 344 | 1.3 | ▲1.1 | | | |

=== 2009 election ===
State election (2009): Oberhavel II
| Notes: | Blue background denotes the winner of the electorate vote. Pink background denotes a candidate elected from their party list. Yellow background denotes an electorate win by a list member, or other incumbent. A ✓ or ✗ denotes status of any incumbent, win or lose respectively. | | | | | | |
| Party | Candidate | Votes | % | ±% | Party votes | % | ±% |
|---|---|---|---|---|---|---|---|
| SPD | ✓ Alwin Ziel | 11,868 | 29.4 | ▼2.3 | 12,632 | 31.1 | ▼0.6 |
| CDU | Astrid Gersich | 11,276 | 28.0 | ▲3.3 | 9,435 | 23.3 | ▲0.4 |
| Left | Peter Ligner | 8,886 | 22.0 | ▼3.3 | 8,245 | 20.3 | ▼1.6 |
| Greens | Christian Goetjes | 3,484 | 8.6 | ▲0.5 | 3,861 | 9.5 | ▲2.1 |
| FDP | Helmuth Reitmayer | 2,889 | 7.2 | ▲2.1 | 3,992 | 9.7 | ▲5.5 |
| NPD | Reimar Leibner | 1,029 | 2.6 | | 875 | 2.2 | |
| BVB/FW | Werner Lindenberg | 901 | 2.2 | | 638 | 1.6 | |
| DVU | | | | | 300 | 0.7 | ▼4.2 |
| 50Plus | | | | | 223 | 0.5 | ▼0.8 |
| RRP | | | | | 154 | 0.4 | |
| REP | | | | | 124 | 0.3 | |
| Die-Volksinitiative | | | | | 108 | 0.3 | |
| DKP | | | | | 47 | 0.1 | Steady |
| Informal votes | | 1,070 | | | 839 | | |
| Total valid votes | | 40,333 | | | 40,564 | | |
| Turnout | | 41,403 | 75.2 | ▲15.1 | | | |
| SPD hold | Majority | 592 | 1.4 | ▼5.6 | | | |

=== 2004 election ===
State election (2004): Oberhavel II
| Notes: | Blue background denotes the winner of the electorate vote. Pink background denotes a candidate elected from their party list. Yellow background denotes an electorate win by a list member, or other incumbent. A ✓ or ✗ denotes status of any incumbent, win or lose respectively. | | | | | | |
| Party | Candidate | Votes | % | ±% | Party votes | % | ±% |
|---|---|---|---|---|---|---|---|
| SPD | Alwin Ziel | 9,188 | 31.68 | | 9,274 | 31.72 | |
| PDS | Peter Ligner | 7,342 | 25.32 | | 6,404 | 21.90 | |
| CDU | Milutin Stefanov | 7,158 | 24.68 | | 6,708 | 22.94 | |
| Greens | Thomas von Gizycki | 2,363 | 8.15 | | 2,169 | 7.42 | |
| DVU | | | | | 1,442 | 4.93 | |
| FDP | Hans Günther Oberlack | 1,471 | 5.07 | | 1,242 | 4.25 | |
| Familie | | | | | 648 | 2.22 | |
| Gray Panthers | | | | | 408 | 1.40 | |
| 50Plus | | | | | 394 | 1.35 | |
| AfW (Free Voters) | Knut Pawlak | 787 | 2.71 | | 149 | 0.51 | |
| Schill | Frank Röchert | 692 | 2.39 | | 138 | 0.47 | |
| AUB-Brandenburg | | | | | 92 | 0.31 | |
| BRB | | | | | 79 | 0.27 | |
| Yes Brandenburg | | | | | 65 | 0.22 | |
| DKP | | | | | 27 | 0.09 | |
| Informal votes | | 797 | | | 559 | | |
| Total valid votes | | 29,001 | | | 29,239 | | |
| Turnout | | 29,798 | 60.12 | | | | |
| SPD win new seat | Majority | 1,846 | 6.36 | | | | |

== See also ==
- Politics of Brandenburg
- Landtag of Brandenburg
