= Potsdam I =

State electoral district of Germany

21: Potsdam I
- Electoral district for the Landtag of Brandenburg
- Potsdam I in 2024
- District: Potsdam
- Electorate: 53,688 (2024)
- Major settlements: Potsdam (partial)

Current electoral district
- Created: 1994
- Party: SPD
- Member: Manja Schüle

Potsdam I is an electoral constituency (German: Wahlkreis) represented in the Landtag of Brandenburg. It elects one member via first-past-the-post voting. Under the constituency numbering system, it is designated as constituency 21. It is located in within the city of Potsdam.

== Geography ==
The constituency includes the districts of Babelsberg, Klein-Glienicke, Nördliche Innenstadt, Nördliche Vorstädte, and Westliche Vorstädte

There were 53,688 eligible voters in 2024.

== Members ==
Election	Member	Party	%
2004	Klara Geywitz	SPD	33.6
2009	Klara Geywitz	SPD	31.6
2014	Klara Geywitz	SPD	28.0
2019	Marie Schäffer	Grüne	27.0
2024	Manja Schüle	SPD	34.4

== Election results ==
=== 2024 election ===
State election (2024): Potsdam I
Notes:	Blue background denotes the winner of the electorate vote. Pink background denotes a candidate elected from their party list. Yellow background denotes an electorate win by a list member, or other incumbent. A ✓ or ✗ denotes status of any incumbent, win or lose respectively.						
Party	Candidate	Votes	%	±%	Party votes	%	±%
SPD	Dr. Manja Schüle	15,281	34.4	▲7.7	16,689	37.4	▲12.4
Greens	✗ Marie Schäffer	11,799	26.6	▼0.5	7,599	17.0	▼12.1
AfD	Krause	5,171	11.6	▲2.6	4,756	10.7	▲1.3
CDU	Mutschischk	5,099	11.5	▼1.4	4,888	10.9	▼0.7
BSW					4,443	10.0	
Left	Vandre	3,633	8.2	▼7.1	3,292	7.4	▼6.1
Plus					924	2.1	▲0.1
BVB/FW	Dr. Reichert	1,344	3.0	▲0.5	519	1.2	▼0.7
APT	Ripp	1,263	2.8		754	1.7	▼0.4
FDP	Prof. Dr. Böhm	848	1.9	▼1.9	590	1/3	▼3.7
Values					78	0.2	
DLW					64	0.1	
DKP					39	0.1	
Third Way					14	0.0	
Informal votes		369			159		
Total valid votes		44,438			44,648		
Turnout		44,807	83.5	▲7.6			
SPD gain from Greens	Majority	3,482	7.8				

=== 2019 election ===
State election (2019): Potsdam I
Notes:	Blue background denotes the winner of the electorate vote. Pink background denotes a candidate elected from their party list. Yellow background denotes an electorate win by a list member, or other incumbent. A ✓ or ✗ denotes status of any incumbent, win or lose respectively.						
Party	Candidate	Votes	%	±%	Party votes	%	±%
Greens	Marie Schäffer	10,956	27.0	▲11.3	11,821	29.1	▲9.9
SPD	✗ Klara Geywitz	10,813	26.7	▼1.3	10,147	25.0	▼1.8
Left	Isabelle Vandre	6,178	15.2	▼6.9	5,471	13.5	▼7.3
CDU	Clemens Viehrig	5,210	12.9	▼5.4	4,709	11.6	▼6.4
AfD	Helmar Wobeto	3,654	9.0	▲1.8	3,807	9.4	▲1.9
FDP	Axel Graf Bülow	1,553	3.8	▲2.2	2,020	5.0	▲3.0
Die PARTEI	Luisa Preschel	1,123	2.8	▲0.2			
Tierschutzpartei					860	2.1	
BVB/FW	Andreas Menzel	1,032	2.5	▲0.8	750	1.8	▲0.5
ÖDP					461	1.1	
Pirates					320	0.8	▼2.6
V-Partei3					210	0.5	
Informal votes		292			235		
Total valid votes		40,519			40,576		
Turnout		40,811	75.9	▲14.2			
Greens gain from SPD	Majority	143	0.3				

=== 2014 election ===
State election (2014): Potsdam I
Notes:	Blue background denotes the winner of the electorate vote. Pink background denotes a candidate elected from their party list. Yellow background denotes an electorate win by a list member, or other incumbent. A ✓ or ✗ denotes status of any incumbent, win or lose respectively.						
Party	Candidate	Votes	%	±%	Party votes	%	±%
SPD	✓ Klara Geywitz	8,762	28.0	▼3.6	8,395	26.8	▼7.8
Left	Anita Tack	6,928	22.1	▼5.6	6,523	20.8	▼3.3
CDU	Dr. Wieland Niekisch	5,723	18.3	▲2.6	5,641	18.0	▲3.6
Greens	Marie Luise von Halem	4,904	15.7	▲0.7	5,997	19.2	▲3.1
AfD	Dr. Alexander Gauland	2,243	7.2		1,065	3.4	
Pirates	Torben Reichert	862	2.8		1,065	3.4	
Die PARTEI	Bettina Franke	820	2.6				
BVB/FW	Wolfgang Cornelius	525	1.7	Steady	397	1.3	▲0.3
FDP	Axel Graf Bülow	516	1.6	▼6.7	614	2.0	▼5.3
NPD					113	0.4	▼0.3
DKP					162	0.5	▲0.2
REP					29	0.1	Steady
Informal votes		330			320		
Total valid votes		31,283			31,293		
Turnout		31,613	61.7	▼15.5			
SPD hold	Majority	1,834	5.9	▲2.0			

=== 2009 election ===
State election (2009): Potsdam I
Notes:	Blue background denotes the winner of the electorate vote. Pink background denotes a candidate elected from their party list. Yellow background denotes an electorate win by a list member, or other incumbent. A ✓ or ✗ denotes status of any incumbent, win or lose respectively.						
Party	Candidate	Votes	%	±%	Party votes	%	±%
SPD	✓ Klara Geywitz	14,749	31.6	▼2.0	16,255	34.5	▼3.5
Left	Anita Tack	12,893	27.6	▼4.1	11,326	24.1	▼1.1
CDU	Wieland Niekisch	7,675	16.5	▼2.0	7,083	15.0	▼0.6
Greens	Maria Luise von Halem	6,559	14.1	▲1.8	7,134	15.2	▲5.0
FDP	Linda Teuteberg	3,992	8.6	▲4.7	3,520	7.5	▲4.7
BVB/FW	Marco Schade	776	1.7		483	1.0	
NPD					336	0.7	
DVU					244	0.5	▼1.8
RRP					239	0.5	
50Plus					157	0.3	▼0.1
DKP					144	0.3	Steady
Die-Volksinitiative					82	0.2	
REP					67	0.1	
Informal votes		1,257			831		
Total valid votes		46,644			47,070		
Turnout		47,901	76.8	▲9.9			
SPD hold	Majority	1,856	4.0	▼2.1			

=== 2004 election ===
State election (2004): Potsdam I
Notes:	Blue background denotes the winner of the electorate vote. Pink background denotes a candidate elected from their party list. Yellow background denotes an electorate win by a list member, or other incumbent. A ✓ or ✗ denotes status of any incumbent, win or lose respectively.						
Party	Candidate	Votes	%	±%	Party votes	%	±%
SPD	Klara Geywitz	12,330	33.60		14,054	37.98	
PDS	Anita Tack	11,649	31.74		9,329	25.21	
CDU	Wieland Niekisch	6,799	18.53		9,329	25.21	
Greens	Wolfgang Wieland	4,507	12.28		3,783	10.22	
FDP	Heinz Lanfermann	1,416	3.86		1,024	2.77	
Familie					1,231	3.33	
DVU					847	2.29	
Gray Panthers					313	0.85	
AUB-Brandenburg					185	0.50	
50Plus					163	0.44	
DKP					118	0.32	
BRB					61	0.16	
Yes Brandenburg					59	0.16	
AfW (Free Voters)					54	0.15	
Schill					24	0.06	
Informal votes		901			596		
Total valid votes		36,701			37,006		
Turnout		37,602	66.92				
SPD win new seat	Majority	681	1.96				

== See also ==
- Politics of Brandenburg
- Landtag of Brandenburg
