= Teltow-Fläming III =

State electoral district of Germany

25: Teltow-Fläming III
- Electoral district for the Landtag of Brandenburg
- Teltow-Fläming III in 2024
- District: Teltow-Fläming
- Electorate: 52,066 (2024)
- Major settlements: Baruth/Mark and Zossen

Current electoral district
- Created: 1994
- Party: SPD
- Member: Ines Seiler

Teltow-Fläming III is an electoral constituency (German: Wahlkreis) represented in the Landtag of Brandenburg. It elects one member via first-past-the-post voting. Under the constituency numbering system, it is designated as constituency 25. It is located in within the district of Teltow-Fläming.

== Geography ==
The constituency includes the towns of Baruth/Mark and Zossen, as well as the communities of Blankenfelde-Mahlow and Rangsdorf.

There were 52,066 eligible voters in 2024.

== Members ==
Election	Member	Party	%
2004	Christophe Schulze	SPD	32.7
2009	Christophe Schulze	SPD	26.9
2014	Christoph Schulze	BVB/FW	27.0
2019	Ortwin Baier	SPD	24.8
2024	Ines Seiler	SPD	32.5

== Election results ==
=== 2024 election ===
State election (2024): Teltow-Fläming III
Notes:	Blue background denotes the winner of the electorate vote. Pink background denotes a candidate elected from their party list. Yellow background denotes an electorate win by a list member, or other incumbent. A ✓ or ✗ denotes status of any incumbent, win or lose respectively.						
Party	Candidate	Votes	%	±%	Party votes	%	±%
SPD	Ines Seiler	12,202	32.5	▲0.8	11,649	30.9	▲6.4
AfD	Daniel Freiherr von Lützow	11,146	29.7	▲7.4	10,208	27.1	▲4.8
CDU	Kaehlert	7,250	19.3	▲2.9	5,499	14.6	▼1.3
BSW					4,580	12.2	
BVB/FW	✗ Stefke	3,334	8.9	Steady	1,405	3.7	▼2.7
APT					1,003	2.7	▼0.6
Left	Kosin	1,679	4.5	▼6.5	834	2.2	▼6.3
Greens	Heydick	1,274	3.4	▼8.7	1,461	3.9	▼8.5
FDP	Korsch	622	1.7	▼2.9	421	1.1	▼4.0
Plus					314	0.8	▼0.6
DLW					144	0.4	
Values					121	0.3	
Third Way					38	0.1	
DKP					15	0.0	
Informal votes		462			277		
Total valid votes		37,507			37,692		
Turnout		37,969	72.9	▲9.3			
SPD hold	Majority	1,056	2.8	▲0.3			

=== 2019 election ===
State election (2019): Teltow-Fläming III
Notes:	Blue background denotes the winner of the electorate vote. Pink background denotes a candidate elected from their party list. Yellow background denotes an electorate win by a list member, or other incumbent. A ✓ or ✗ denotes status of any incumbent, win or lose respectively.						
Party	Candidate	Votes	%	±%	Party votes	%	±%
SPD	Ortwin Baier	7,829	24.8	▲6.2	7,745	24.5	▲0.7
AfD	Daniel Freiherr von Lützow	7,033	22.3	▲10.5	7,068	22.3	▲8.4
CDU	Robert Dieter Trebus	5,192	16.4	▼1.5	5,023	15.9	▼4.1
Greens	Philipp Maaßen	3,810	12.1	▲7.3	3,909	12.3	▲5.7
Left	Carsten Preuß	3,475	11.0	▼3.0	2,707	8.5	▼6.1
BVB/FW	Matthias Stefke	2,805	8.9	▼18.1	2,042	6.4	▼8.5
FDP	Corina Jäger	1,437	4.6	▲0.7	1,612	5.1	▲3.5
Tierschutzpartei					1,028	3.2	
Pirates					260	0.8	▼1.5
ÖDP					205	0.6	
V-Partei3					67	0.2	
Informal votes		636			551		
Total valid votes		31,581			31,666		
Turnout		32,217	63.6	▲15.2			
SPD gain from BVB/FW	Majority	796	2.5				

=== 2014 election ===
State election (2014): Teltow-Fläming III
Notes:	Blue background denotes the winner of the electorate vote. Pink background denotes a candidate elected from their party list. Yellow background denotes an electorate win by a list member, or other incumbent. A ✓ or ✗ denotes status of any incumbent, win or lose respectively.						
Party	Candidate	Votes	%	±%	Party votes	%	±%
BVB/FW	✓ Christoph Schulze	6,281	27.0	▲24.2	3,455	14.9	▲12.0
SPD	Dietlind Juliane Biesterfeld	4,330	18.6	▼8.3	5,539	23.8	▼5.9
CDU	Dr. Karin Petersohn	4,167	17.9	▼5.4	4,664	20.0	▼1.4
Left	Carsten Preuß	3,253	14.0	▼9.2	3,397	14.6	▼8.5
AfD	Daniel Freiherr von Lützow	2,752	11.8		3,240	13.9	
Greens	Dr. Gerhard Kalinka	1,122	4.8	▼1.9	1,544	6.6	▼0.9
NPD					426	1.8	▼0.9
FDP	Klaus Rocher	907	3.9	▼3.9	380	1.6	▼8.0
Pirates	Oliver Mücke	430	1.9		526	2.3	
REP					53	0.2	▼0.1
DKP					41	0.2	▲0.1
Informal votes		375			352		
Total valid votes		23,242			23,265		
Turnout		23,617	48.4	▼22.3			
BVB/FW gain from SPD	Majority	1,951	8.4				

=== 2009 election ===
State election (2009): Teltow-Fläming III
Notes:	Blue background denotes the winner of the electorate vote. Pink background denotes a candidate elected from their party list. Yellow background denotes an electorate win by a list member, or other incumbent. A ✓ or ✗ denotes status of any incumbent, win or lose respectively.						
Party	Candidate	Votes	%	±%	Party votes	%	±%
SPD	✓ Christoph Schulze	8,719	26.9	▼5.8	9,661	29.7	▲0.3
CDU	Ralf von Bank	7,571	23.3	▲0.3	6,972	21.4	▲1.2
Left	Hartmut Rex	7,526	23.2	▼3.3	7,504	23.1	▲0.2
FDP	Mattes Woeller	2,537	7.8	▲2.5	3,139	9.6	▲5.3
Greens	Gerhard Kalinka	2,189	6.7	▲0.5	2,440	7.5	▲2.1
Independent	Andreas Noack	2,101	6.5				
NPD	André Herbon	919	2.8		888	2.7	
BVB/FW	Hartmut Klucke	893	2.8		937	2.9	
DVU					260	0.8	▼4.9
RRP					215	0.7	
Die-Volksinitiative					197	0.6	
50Plus					193	0.6	▼0.1
REP					92	0.3	
DKP					40	0.1	▼0.1
Informal votes		1,005			922		
Total valid votes		32,455			32,538		
Turnout		33,460	70.7	▲12.4			
SPD hold	Majority	1,148	3.6	▼2.6			

=== 2004 election ===
State election (2004): Teltow-Fläming III
Notes:	Blue background denotes the winner of the electorate vote. Pink background denotes a candidate elected from their party list. Yellow background denotes an electorate win by a list member, or other incumbent. A ✓ or ✗ denotes status of any incumbent, win or lose respectively.						
Party	Candidate	Votes	%	±%	Party votes	%	±%
SPD	Christoph Schulze	8,046	32.70		7,305	29.36	
PDS	Hartmut Rex	6,528	26.53		5,692	22.88	
CDU	Peter Wagner	5,659	23.00		5,016	20.16	
DVU					1,412	5.67	
AUB-Brandenburg					1,337	5.37	
Greens	Gerhard Kalinka	1,517	6.16		1,335	5.37	
FDP	Heike Haak	1,310	5.32		1,074	4.32	
Familie					762	3.06	
Gray Panthers					274	1.10	
AfW (Free Voters)	Marco Kehling	1,027	4.17		213	0.86	
50Plus					164	0.66	
Schill	Katja Speiß	520	2.11		104	0.42	
BRB					93	0.37	
Yes Brandenburg					57	0.23	
DKP					44	0.18	
Informal votes		823			548		
Total valid votes		24,607			24,882		
Turnout		25,430	58.27				
SPD win new seat	Majority	1,518	6.17				

== See also ==
- Politics of Brandenburg
- Landtag of Brandenburg
