= Potsdam-Mittelmark IV =

State electoral district of Germany

20: Potsdam-Mittelmark IV
- Electoral district for the Landtag of Brandenburg
- Potsdam-Mittelmark IV in 2024
- District: Potsdam-Mittelmark
- Electorate: 58,235 (2024)
- Major settlements: Teltow

Current electoral district
- Created: 1994
- Party: SPD
- Member: Sebastian Rüter

Potsdam-Mittelmark IV is an electoral constituency (German: Wahlkreis) represented in the Landtag of Brandenburg. It elects one member via first-past-the-post voting. Under the constituency numbering system, it is designated as constituency 20. It is located in the district of Potsdam-Mittelmark.

== Geography ==
The constituency includes the town of Teltow, as well as the communities of Kleinmachnow, Nuthetal, and Stahnsdorf.

There were 58,235 eligible voters in 2024.

== Members ==
| Election | Member | Party | % |
|---|---|---|---|
| 2004 | Jens Klocksin | SPD | 31.3 |
| 2009 | Sören Kosanke | SPD | 30.9 |
| 2014 | Sören Kosanke | SPD | 26.9 |
| 2019 | Sebastian Rüter | SPD | 26.8 |
| 2024 | Sebastian Rüter | SPD | 40.4 |

== Election results ==
=== 2024 election ===
State election (2024): Potsdam-Mittelmark IV
| Notes: | Blue background denotes the winner of the electorate vote. Pink background denotes a candidate elected from their party list. Yellow background denotes an electorate win by a list member, or other incumbent. A ✓ or ✗ denotes status of any incumbent, win or lose respectively. | | | | | | |
| Party | Candidate | Votes | % | ±% | Party votes | % | ±% |
|---|---|---|---|---|---|---|---|
| SPD | ✓ Sebastian Rüter | 18,295 | 40.0 | ▲13.2 | 17,168 | 37.4 | ▲10.8 |
| CDU | Mirna Richel | 8,881 | 19.4 | ▲2.1 | 8,036 | 17.5 | ▲1.0 |
| AfD | Dr. Zeschmann | 8,390 | 18.3 | ▲5.4 | 7,601 | 16.5 | ▲3.0 |
| Greens | Hahn | 3,637 | 8.0 | ▼12.6 | 4,377 | 9.5 | ▼11.2 |
| BSW | | | | | 4,207 | 9.2 | |
| BVB/FW | Albers | 2,743 | 6.0 | ▼0.6 | 916 | 2.0 | ▼2.3 |
| Left | Janct | 1,580 | 3.5 | ▼4.5 | 1,161 | 2.5 | ▼4.5 |
| FDP | Goetz | 1,332 | 2.9 | ▼5.0 | 900 | 2.0 | ▼5.6 |
| Tierschutzpartei | | | | | 856 | 1.9 | ▼0.3 |
| Plus | Borrmann | 879 | 1.9 | | 497 | 1.1 | ▼0.3 |
| Values | | | | | 110 | 0.2 | |
| DLW | | | | | 83 | 0.2 | |
| DKP | | | | | 15 | 0.0 | |
| Third Way | | | | | 13 | 0.0 | |
| Informal votes | | 467 | | | 264 | | |
| Total valid votes | | 45,737 | | | 45,940 | | |
| Turnout | | 46,204 | 79.3 | ▲8.2 | | | |
| SPD hold | Majority | 9,414 | 20.6 | | | | |

=== 2019 election ===
State election (2019): Potsdam-Mittelmark IV
| Notes: | Blue background denotes the winner of the electorate vote. Pink background denotes a candidate elected from their party list. Yellow background denotes an electorate win by a list member, or other incumbent. A ✓ or ✗ denotes status of any incumbent, win or lose respectively. | | | | | | |
| Party | Candidate | Votes | % | ±% | Party votes | % | ±% |
|---|---|---|---|---|---|---|---|
| SPD | Sebastian Rüter | 10,728 | 26.8 | ▼0.5 | 10,659 | 26.6 | ▼0.3 |
| Greens | Alexandra Pichl | 8,224 | 20.5 | ▲8.2 | 8,335 | 20.8 | ▲7.0 |
| CDU | Dietrich Rudorff | 6,950 | 17.3 | ▼9.9 | 6,605 | 16.5 | ▼9.1 |
| AfD | Hans-Stefan Edler | 5,191 | 12.9 | ▲3.0 | 5,448 | 13.6 | ▲2.5 |
| Left | Marlen Block | 3,179 | 7.9 | ▼4.9 | 2,820 | 7.0 | ▼5.8 |
| FDP | Hans-Peter Goetz | 3,165 | 7.9 | ▲4.3 | 3,047 | 7.6 | ▲4.8 |
| BVB/FW | Andreas Wolf | 2,651 | 6.6 | ▲1.5 | 1,735 | 4.3 | ▲0.5 |
| Tierschutzpartei | | | | | 850 | 2.1 | |
| Pirates | | | | | 297 | 0.7 | ▼1.2 |
| ÖDP | | | | | 253 | 0.6 | |
| V-Partei3 | | | | | 78 | 0.2 | |
| Informal votes | | 322 | | | 283 | | |
| Total valid votes | | 40,088 | | | 40,127 | | |
| Turnout | | 40,410 | 71.2 | ▲12.6 | | | |
| SPD hold | Majority | 2,504 | 6.3 | ▲6.2 | | | |

=== 2014 election ===
State election (2014): Potsdam-Mittelmark IV
| Notes: | Blue background denotes the winner of the electorate vote. Pink background denotes a candidate elected from their party list. Yellow background denotes an electorate win by a list member, or other incumbent. A ✓ or ✗ denotes status of any incumbent, win or lose respectively. | | | | | | |
| Party | Candidate | Votes | % | ±% | Party votes | % | ±% |
|---|---|---|---|---|---|---|---|
| SPD | ✓ Sören Kosanke | 8,604 | 27.3 | ▼3.6 | 8,490 | 26.9 | ▼8.0 |
| CDU | Daniel Mühlner | 8,581 | 27.2 | ▲2.7 | 8,085 | 25.6 | ▲3.7 |
| Left | Konstantin Gräfe | 4,027 | 12.8 | ▼9.6 | 4,052 | 12.8 | ▼5.4 |
| Greens | Thomas Michel | 3,889 | 12.3 | ▲1.4 | 4,353 | 13.8 | ▲3.0 |
| AfD | Klaus Morian | 3,111 | 9.9 | | 3,489 | 11.1 | |
| BVB/FW | Antje Aurich-Haider | 1,604 | 5.1 | ▲3.5 | 1,210 | 3.8 | ▲2.8 |
| FDP | Hans-Peter Goetz | 1,140 | 3.6 | ▼6.1 | 879 | 2.8 | ▼7.1 |
| Pirates | Jeannette Paech | 556 | 1.8 | | 601 | 1.9 | |
| NPD | | | | | 321 | 1.0 | ▼0.2 |
| REP | | | | | 51 | 0.2 | ▲0.1 |
| DKP | | | | | 43 | 0.1 | Steady |
| Informal votes | | 412 | | | 350 | | |
| Total valid votes | | 31,512 | | | 31,574 | | |
| Turnout | | 31,924 | 58.6 | ▼19.9 | | | |
| SPD hold | Majority | 23 | 0.1 | ▼6.3 | | | |

=== 2009 election ===
State election (2009): Potsdam-Mittelmark IV
| Notes: | Blue background denotes the winner of the electorate vote. Pink background denotes a candidate elected from their party list. Yellow background denotes an electorate win by a list member, or other incumbent. A ✓ or ✗ denotes status of any incumbent, win or lose respectively. | | | | | | |
| Party | Candidate | Votes | % | ±% | Party votes | % | ±% |
|---|---|---|---|---|---|---|---|
| SPD | Sören Kosanke | 11,876 | 30.9 | ▼0.4 | 13,546 | 34.9 | Steady |
| CDU | Gerhard Enser | 9,445 | 24.5 | ▼5.3 | 8,478 | 21.9 | ▼2.5 |
| Left | Klaus-Jürgen Warnick | 8,629 | 22.4 | ▼0.3 | 7,050 | 18.2 | ▼0.9 |
| Greens | Thomas Michel | 4,183 | 10.9 | ▲2.5 | 4,207 | 10.8 | ▲2.3 |
| FDP | Hans-Peter Goetz | 3,750 | 9.7 | ▲4.8 | 3,831 | 9.9 | ▲5.2 |
| NPD | | | | | 461 | 1.2 | |
| BVB/FW | Thomas Gerald Müller | 601 | 1.6 | | 385 | 1.0 | |
| DVU | | | | | 223 | 0.6 | ▼2.4 |
| RRP | | | | | 180 | 0.5 | |
| Die-Volksinitiative | | | | | 178 | 0.5 | |
| 50Plus | | | | | 142 | 0.4 | ▼0.4 |
| REP | | | | | 57 | 0.1 | |
| DKP | | | | | 46 | 0.1 | Steady |
| Informal votes | | 969 | | | 669 | | |
| Total valid votes | | 38,484 | | | 38,784 | | |
| Turnout | | 39,453 | 78.5 | ▲11.6 | | | |
| SPD hold | Majority | 2,431 | 6.4 | ▲4.9 | | | |

=== 2004 election ===
State election (2004): Potsdam-Mittelmark IV
| Notes: | Blue background denotes the winner of the electorate vote. Pink background denotes a candidate elected from their party list. Yellow background denotes an electorate win by a list member, or other incumbent. A ✓ or ✗ denotes status of any incumbent, win or lose respectively. | | | | | | |
| Party | Candidate | Votes | % | ±% | Party votes | % | ±% |
|---|---|---|---|---|---|---|---|
| SPD | Jens Klocksin | 9,443 | 31.29 | | 10,579 | 34.93 | |
| CDU | Jörg Schönbohm | 8,978 | 29.75 | | 7,376 | 24.36 | |
| PDS | Klaus-Jürgen Warnick | 6,853 | 22.71 | | 5,773 | 19.06 | |
| Greens | Cornelia Behm | 2,536 | 8.40 | | 2,565 | 8.47 | |
| FDP | Hans-Peter Goetz | 1,488 | 4.93 | | 1,431 | 4.73 | |
| DVU | | | | | 910 | 3.00 | |
| Familie | | | | | 747 | 2.47 | |
| Gray Panthers | | | | | 283 | 0.93 | |
| 50Plus | | | | | 247 | 0.82 | |
| AfW (Free Voters) | Willy Ullmann | 877 | 2.91 | | 138 | 0.46 | |
| BRB | | | | | 74 | 0.24 | |
| AUB-Brandenburg | | | | | 63 | 0.21 | |
| Yes Brandenburg | | | | | 49 | 0.16 | |
| DKP | | | | | 33 | 0.11 | |
| Schill | | | | | 17 | 0.06 | |
| Informal votes | | 517 | | | 407 | | |
| Total valid votes | | 30,175 | | | 30,285 | | |
| Turnout | | 30,692 | 66.89 | | | | |
| SPD win new seat | Majority | 465 | 1.54 | | | | |

== See also ==
- Politics of Brandenburg
- Landtag of Brandenburg
