= Cottbus I =

State electoral district of Germany

43: Cottbus I
- Electoral district for the Landtag of Brandenburg
- Cottbus I in 2024
- District: Cottbus
- Electorate: 39,327 (2024)
- Major settlements: Cottbus (partial)

Current electoral district
- Created: 1994
- Party: AfD
- Member: Jean-Pascal Hohm

Cottbus I is an electoral constituency (German: Wahlkreis) represented in the Landtag of Brandenburg. It elects one member via first-past-the-post voting. Under the constituency numbering system, it is designated as constituency 43. It is located in within the city of Cottbus.

== Geography ==
The constituency includes the districts of Branitz, Dissenchen, Döbbrick, Merzdorf, Mitte, Sandow, Saspow, Schmellwitz, Sielow, Skadow, and Willmersdorf within the city of Cottbus.

There were 39,327 eligible voters in 2024.

== Members ==
Election	Member	Party	%
2004	Martina Münch	SPD	31.3
2009	Martina Münch	SPD	31.6
2014	Michael Schierack	CDU	37.6
2019	Marianne Spring-Räumschüssel	AfD	25.9
2024	Jean-Pascal Hohm	AfD	34.6

== Election results ==
=== 2024 election ===
State election (2024): Cottbus I
Notes:	Blue background denotes the winner of the electorate vote. Pink background denotes a candidate elected from their party list. Yellow background denotes an electorate win by a list member, or other incumbent. A ✓ or ✗ denotes status of any incumbent, win or lose respectively.						
Party	Candidate	Votes	%	±%	Party votes	%	±%
AfD	Jean-Pascal Hohm	9,653	34.6	▲8.7	8,921	31.8	▲4.9
SPD	Gunnar Kurth	9,362	33.6	▲11.6	9,075	32.3	▲8.3
BSW					3,851	13.7	
CDU	Michael Schierack	4,509	16.2	▼4.9	2,858	10.2	▼5.6
Left	Christopher Neumann	1,121	4.0	▼8.1	756	2.7	▼8.1
Tierschutzpartei					457	1.6	▼0.8
BVB/FW	Torsten Kaps	1,118	4.0	▼2.2	442	1.6	▼2.5
Demokraten BB	Peter-Alexander Mai	800	2.9				
Plus	Martin Franke	417	1.5		275	1.0	▼0.5
Greens	Doris Tuchan	413	1.5	▼5.9	910	3.2	▼5.3
FDP	Oliver Grund	369	1.3	▼3.6	201	0.7	▼5.0
Values					143	0.5	
DLW					76	0.3	
Third Way					47	0.2	
DKP	Fabian Große	138	0.5	Steady	41	0.1	
Informal votes		338			185		
Total valid votes		27,900			28,053		
Turnout		28,238	71.8	▲9.8			
AfD hold	Majority	291	1.0	▼3.0			

=== 2019 election ===
State election (2019): Cottbus I
Notes:	Blue background denotes the winner of the electorate vote. Pink background denotes a candidate elected from their party list. Yellow background denotes an electorate win by a list member, or other incumbent. A ✓ or ✗ denotes status of any incumbent, win or lose respectively.						
Party	Candidate	Votes	%	±%	Party votes	%	±%
AfD	Marianne Spring-Räumschüssel	6,481	25.9		6,753	26.9	▲16.2
SPD	Martina Münch	5,499	21.9	▼7.2	6,029	24.0	▼6.7
CDU	✗ Michael Schierack	5,275	21.1	▼16.5	3,955	15.7	▼13.7
Left	Matthias Loehr	3,040	12.1	▼7.4	2,723	10.8	▼6.6
Greens	Heide Schinowsky	1,850	7.4	▲3.3	2,156	8.6	▲3.8
BVB/FW	Heiko Selka	1,545	6.2	▲1.7	1,012	4.0	▲2.4
FDP	Bastian Garnitz	1,227	4.9	▲3.3	1,432	5.7	▲4.5
Tierschutzpartei					603	2.4	
Pirates					234	0.9	▼1.0
ÖDP					143	0.6	
German Communist Party	Gisela Vierrath	136	0.5				
V-Partei3					75	0.3	
Informal votes		353			291		
Total valid votes		25,053			25,115		
Turnout		25,406	62.0	▲12.4			
AfD gain from CDU	Majority	982	4.0				

=== 2014 election ===
State election (2014): Cottbus I
Notes:	Blue background denotes the winner of the electorate vote. Pink background denotes a candidate elected from their party list. Yellow background denotes an electorate win by a list member, or other incumbent. A ✓ or ✗ denotes status of any incumbent, win or lose respectively.						
Party	Candidate	Votes	%	±%	Party votes	%	±%
CDU	Michael Schierack	7,697	37.6	▲14.0	6,065	29.4	▲10.1
SPD	✗ Martina Münch	5,957	29.1	▼2.5	6,328	30.7	▼2.2
Left	Christopher Neumann	3,988	19.5	▼9.5	3,586	17.4	▼11.3
AfD					2,214	10.7	
BVB/FW	Frank Pilzecker	920	4.5	▲1.9	325	1.6	▼0.5
Greens	Heide Schinowsky	834	4.1	▼0.3	985	4.8	▼0.8
Die PARTEI	Lutz Häschel	753	3.7				
Pirates					389	1.9	
NPD					382	1.9	▼0.8
FDP	Bastian Garnitz	321	1.6	▼3.6	251	1.2	▼5.3
DKP					85	0.4	▲0.2
REP					26	0.1	▼0.1
Informal votes		661			495		
Total valid votes		20,470			20,636		
Turnout		21,131	49.6	▼13.6			
CDU gain from SPD	Majority	1,740	8.5				

=== 2009 election ===
State election (2009): Cottbus I
Notes:	Blue background denotes the winner of the electorate vote. Pink background denotes a candidate elected from their party list. Yellow background denotes an electorate win by a list member, or other incumbent. A ✓ or ✗ denotes status of any incumbent, win or lose respectively.						
Party	Candidate	Votes	%	±%	Party votes	%	±%
SPD	✓ Martina Münch	8,310	31.6	▲0.3	8,705	32.9	▼0.9
Left	Matthias Loehr	7,624	29.0	▼2.0	7,589	28.7	Steady
CDU	Michael Schierack	6,205	23.6	▲2.3	5,089	19.3	▲1.5
FDP	Jens Lipsdorf	1,358	5.2	▲0.7	1,731	6.5	▲3.3
Greens	Heide Schinowsky	1,148	4.4	▲1.1	1,484	5.6	▲2.0
NPD	Frank Maik Hübner	735	2.8		707	2.7	
BVB/FW	Torsten Kaps	675	2.6		562	2.1	
Independent	Lutz Häschel	234	0.9				
DVU					191	0.7	▼4.5
RRP					116	0.4	
50Plus					109	0.4	▼0.3
DKP					58	0.2	Steady
Die-Volksinitiative					48	0.2	
REP					44	0.2	
Informal votes		772			628		
Total valid votes		26,289			26,433		
Turnout		27,061	63.2	▲10.3			
SPD hold	Majority	686	2.6	▲2.3			

=== 2004 election ===
State election (2004): Cottbus I
Notes:	Blue background denotes the winner of the electorate vote. Pink background denotes a candidate elected from their party list. Yellow background denotes an electorate win by a list member, or other incumbent. A ✓ or ✗ denotes status of any incumbent, win or lose respectively.						
Party	Candidate	Votes	%	±%	Party votes	%	±%
SPD	Martina Münch	7,233	31.29		7,848	33.78	
PDS	Matthias Loehr	7,162	30.98		6,674	28.72	
CDU	Wolfgang Bialas	4,935	21.35		4,131	17.78	
DVU					1,208	5.20	
AUB-Brandenburg	Torsten Kaps	1,171	5.07		612	2.63	
FDP	Martin Neumann	1,038	4.49		741	3.19	
Greens	Vivien Speck	761	3.29		841	3.62	
Familie					441	1.90	
AfW (Free Voters)	Marianne Spring	552	2.39		263	1.13	
50Plus					162	0.70	
Gray Panthers					145	0.62	
Schill	Josef Lenden	266	1.15		45	0.19	
Yes Brandenburg					45	0.19	
DKP					41	0.18	
BRB					38	0.16	
Informal votes		408			291		
Total valid votes		23,118			23,235		
Turnout		23,526	52.93				
SPD win new seat	Majority	71	0.31				

== See also ==
- Politics of Brandenburg
- Landtag of Brandenburg
