= Spree-Neiße I =

State electoral district of Germany

41: Spree-Neiße I
- Electoral district for the Landtag of Brandenburg
- Spree-Neiße I in 2024
- District: Spree-Neiße
- Electorate: 39,211 (2024)
- Major settlements: Forst and Guben

Current electoral district
- Created: 1994
- Party: AfD
- Member: Steffen Kutbitzki

Spree-Neiße I is an electoral constituency (German: Wahlkreis) represented in the Landtag of Brandenburg. It elects one member via first-past-the-post voting. Under the constituency numbering system, it is designated as constituency 41. It is located in within the district of Spree-Neiße.

== Geography ==
The constituency includes the towns of Forst and Guben, as well as the municipality of Schenkendöbern, and the district of Peitz.

There were 39,211 eligible voters in 2024.

== Members ==
Election	Member	Party	%
2004	Christian Otto	PDS	34.6
2009	Dietmar Woidke	SPD	34.7
2014	Dietmar Woidke	SPD	49.5
2019	Dietmar Woidke	SPD	36.2
2024	Steffen Kubizki	AfD	41.5

== Election results ==
=== 2024 election ===
State election (2024): Spree-Neiße I
Notes:	Blue background denotes the winner of the electorate vote. Pink background denotes a candidate elected from their party list. Yellow background denotes an electorate win by a list member, or other incumbent. A ✓ or ✗ denotes status of any incumbent, win or lose respectively.						
Party	Candidate	Votes	%	±%	Party votes	%	±%
AfD	Steffen Kubizki	11,563	41.5	▲9.1	10,944	39.2	▲5.3
SPD	✗ Dr. Dietmar Woidke	11,556	41.5	▲5.3	8,117	29.1	▲1.0
BSW					3,877		
CDU	Seng	2,310	8.3	▼1.9	2,583	9.3	▼3.2
BVB/FW	Bubner	1,092	3.9	▼1.0	516	1.8	▼2.3
Left	Ritter	688	2.5	▼4.6	614	2.2	▼6.2
FDP	Staudacher	236	0.8	▼3.6	208	0.7	▼4.2
Die PARTEI	Hanschke	223	0.8				
Tierschutzpartei					400	1.4	▼0.8
Greens	Schinowsky	165	0.6	▼3.4	350	1.3	▼3.5
DLW					106	0.4	
Values					84	0.3	
Plus					83	0.3	▼0.6
Third Way					31	0.1	
DKP					11	0.0	
Informal votes		397			306		
Total valid votes		27,833			27,924		
Turnout		28,230	72.0	▲9.9			
AfD gain from SPD	Majority	7	0.0				

=== 2019 election ===
State election (2019): Spree-Neiße I
Notes:	Blue background denotes the winner of the electorate vote. Pink background denotes a candidate elected from their party list. Yellow background denotes an electorate win by a list member, or other incumbent. A ✓ or ✗ denotes status of any incumbent, win or lose respectively.						
Party	Candidate	Votes	%	±%	Party votes	%	±%
SPD	✓ Dr. Dietmar Woidke	9,268	36.2	▼13.3	7,161	28.0	▼8.0
AfD	Steffen Kubitzki	8,290	32.4	▲20.0	8,665	33.9	▲18.5
CDU	Rüdiger Krause	2,618	10.2	▼8.6	3,194	12.5	▼8.1
Left	Anke Schwarzenberg	1,802	7.0	▼4.7	2,154	8.4	▼7.5
BVB/FW	Olaf Bubner	1,256	4.9	▲3.6	1,055	4.1	▲3.0
FDP	Jeff Staudacher	1,129	4.4		1,255	4.9	▲3.4
Greens	Robert Richter	1,029	4.0	▲0.7	1,221	4.8	▲0.1
Tierschutzpartei					570	2.2	
Pirates	Thomas Friedrich	191	0.7		142	0.6	▼0.4
ÖDP					91	0.4	
V-Partei3					45	0.2	
Informal votes		351			381		
Total valid votes		25,583			25,553		
Turnout		25,934	62.1	▲12.8			
SPD hold	Majority	978	3.8	▼26.9			

=== 2014 election ===
State election (2014): Spree-Neiße I
Notes:	Blue background denotes the winner of the electorate vote. Pink background denotes a candidate elected from their party list. Yellow background denotes an electorate win by a list member, or other incumbent. A ✓ or ✗ denotes status of any incumbent, win or lose respectively.						
Party	Candidate	Votes	%	±%	Party votes	%	±%
SPD	✓ Dr. Dietmar Woidke	10,772	49.5	▲14.8	7,840	36.0	▲4.2
CDU	Monika Schulz-Höpfner	4,094	18.8	▼0.4	4,472	20.6	▲1.3
AfD	Carsten Heintze	2,699	12.4		3,342	15.4	
Left	Anke Schwarzenberg	2,542	11.7	▼19.1	3,456	15.9	▼13.2
Greens	Wolfgang Renner	715	3.3	▼0.7	1,012	4.7	▼0.4
NPD	Jan Seefloth	669	3.1	▼0.4	754	3.5	▲0.1
FDP					328	1.5	▼5.9
BVB/FW	Sebastian Schulze	277	1.3	▼0.1	242	1.1	▼0.1
Pirates					218	1.0	
DKP					50	0.2	▲0.1
REP					42	0.2	▼0.1
Informal votes		369			381		
Total valid votes		21,768			21,756		
Turnout		22,137	49.3	▼15.3			
SPD hold	Majority	6,678	30.7	▲26.8			

=== 2009 election ===
State election (2009): Spree-Neiße I
Notes:	Blue background denotes the winner of the electorate vote. Pink background denotes a candidate elected from their party list. Yellow background denotes an electorate win by a list member, or other incumbent. A ✓ or ✗ denotes status of any incumbent, win or lose respectively.						
Party	Candidate	Votes	%	±%	Party votes	%	±%
SPD	Dietmar Woidke	10,550	34.7	▲11.7	9,667	31.8	▲1.2
Left	Kerstin Nedoma	9,372	30.8	▼3.8	8,854	29.1	▲0.6
CDU	Monika Schulz-Höpfner	5,826	19.2	▼2.6	5,877	19.3	▼0.5
FDP	Thomas Hirsch	1,958	6.4	▼2.6	2,244	7.4	▲3.7
Greens	Wolfgang Renner	1,226	4.0	▲0.8	1,539	5.1	▲3.2
NPD	Marco Neuling	1,068	3.5		1,023	3.4	
BVB/FW	Silvia Schwarz	416	1.4		376	1.2	
DVU					339	1.1	▼6.1
RRP					167	0.5	
50Plus					147	0.5	▼0.4
REP					92	0.3	
Die-Volksinitiative					62	0.2	
DKP					35	0.1	▼0.1
Informal votes		956			950		
Total valid votes		30,416			30,422		
Turnout		31,372	64.6	▲10.6			
SPD gain from PDS	Majority	1,178	3.9				

=== 2004 election ===
State election (2004): Spree-Neiße I
Notes:	Blue background denotes the winner of the electorate vote. Pink background denotes a candidate elected from their party list. Yellow background denotes an electorate win by a list member, or other incumbent. A ✓ or ✗ denotes status of any incumbent, win or lose respectively.						
Party	Candidate	Votes	%	±%	Party votes	%	±%
PDS	Christian Otto	9,290	34.62		7,724	28.54	
SPD	Guido Odendahl	6,178	23.02		8,285	30.61	
CDU	Monika Schulz	5,852	21.80		5,349	19.76	
DVU					1,951	7.21	
FDP	Klaus-Dieter Hübner	2,415	9.00		990	3.66	
Familie					704	2.60	
AfW (Free Voters)	Herbert Gehmert	1,679	6.26		392	1.45	
Greens	Franziska Keller	847	3.16		519	1.92	
Gray Panthers					300	1.11	
50Plus					255	0.94	
AUB-Brandenburg					243	0.90	
Schill	Hans Wußmann	577	2.15		108	0.40	
Yes Brandenburg					103	0.38	
BRB					100	0.37	
DKP					43	0.16	
Informal votes		965			737		
Total valid votes		26,838			27,066		
Turnout		27,803	54.03				
PDS win new seat	Majority	3,112	11.60				

== See also ==
- Politics of Brandenburg
- Landtag of Brandenburg
