= Ingo Senftleben =

German politician

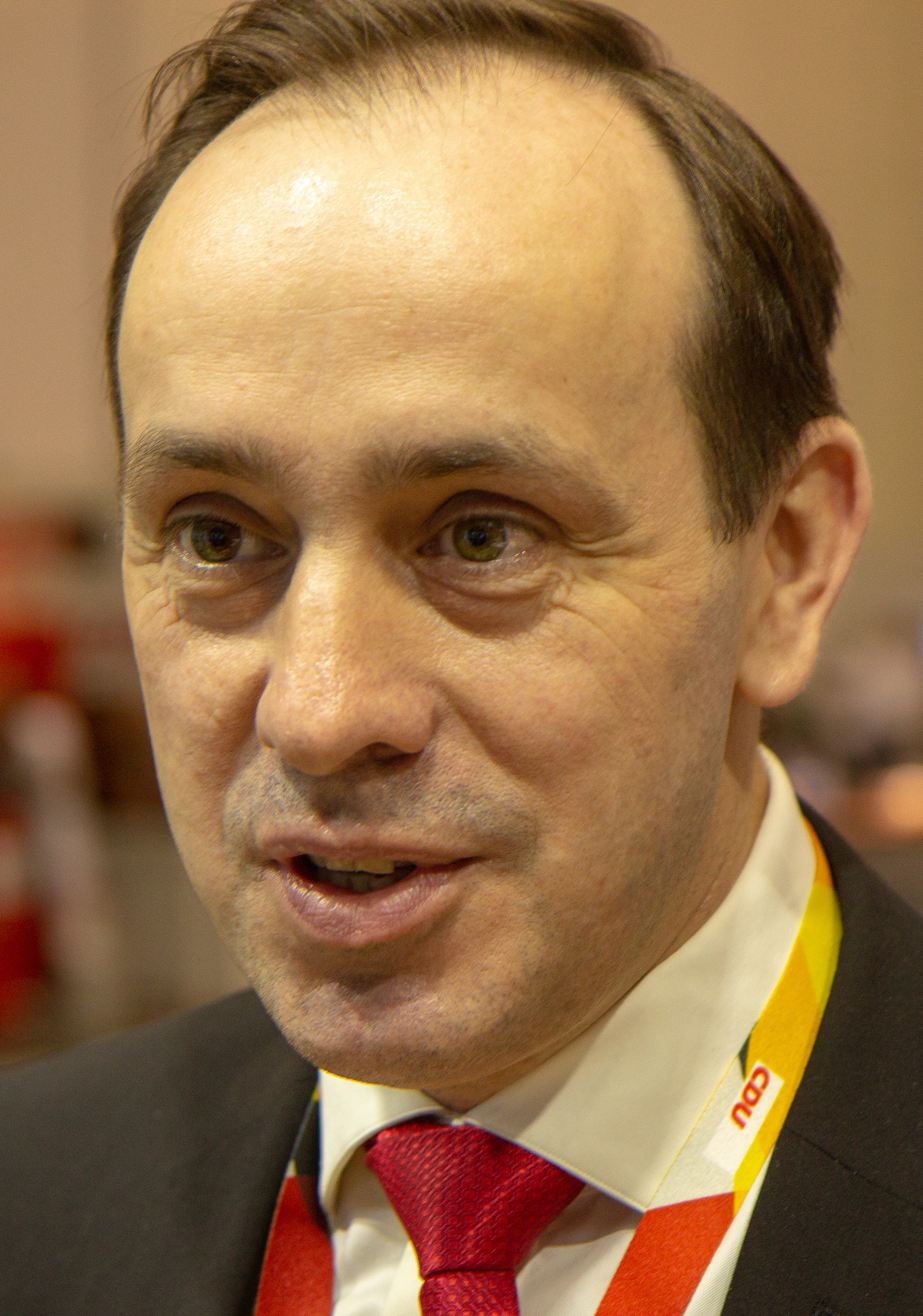

Leader of the Christian Democratic Union in Brandenburg
- In office 25 April 2015 – 10 September 2019
- Preceded by: Michael Schierack

Leader of the CDU Parliamentary Group in the Landtag of Brandenburg
- In office 18 November 2014 – 10 September 2019
- Preceded by: Michael Schierack

Personal details
- Born: 10 August 1974 (age 52) Großenhain, Bezirk Dresden, East Germany
- Party: Christian Democratic Union
- Website: www.ingo-senftleben.de

Ingo Senftleben (born 10 August 1974 in Großenhain) is a German politician of the Christian Democratic Union (CDU).

== Early life and career ==
A trained bricklayer, Senftleben worked at Strabag from 1995 until 1999.

== Political career ==
Senftleben has been a member of the Landtag of Brandenburg since the 1999 state elections. From 2004 until 2009, he chaired the parliament's Committee on Education, Youth and Sports.

On 18 November 2014, Senftleben became leader of the CDU parliamentary group in the Landtag of Brandenburg. On 25 April 2015, he was elected as leader of the CDU of Brandenburg.

In the negotiations to form a coalition government under the leadership of Chancellor Angela Merkel following the 2017 federal elections, Senftleben was part of the working group on energy, climate protection and the environment, led by Armin Laschet, Georg Nüßlein and Barbara Hendricks.

After the poorly outcome of his party in the 2019 Brandenburg state election Senftleben abdicated on 10 September 2019 as party and parliamentary group leader.

== Other activities ==
- Rundfunk Berlin-Brandenburg (RBB), Member of the Broadcasting Council

== Political positions ==
In 2018, Senftleben became the first leading the CDU politician to declare his openness to going into coalition with the nationalist Alternative for Germany (AfD) party.

== Personal life ==
Senftleben is married and has three children.
