= Péter Vida =

German politician (born 1983)

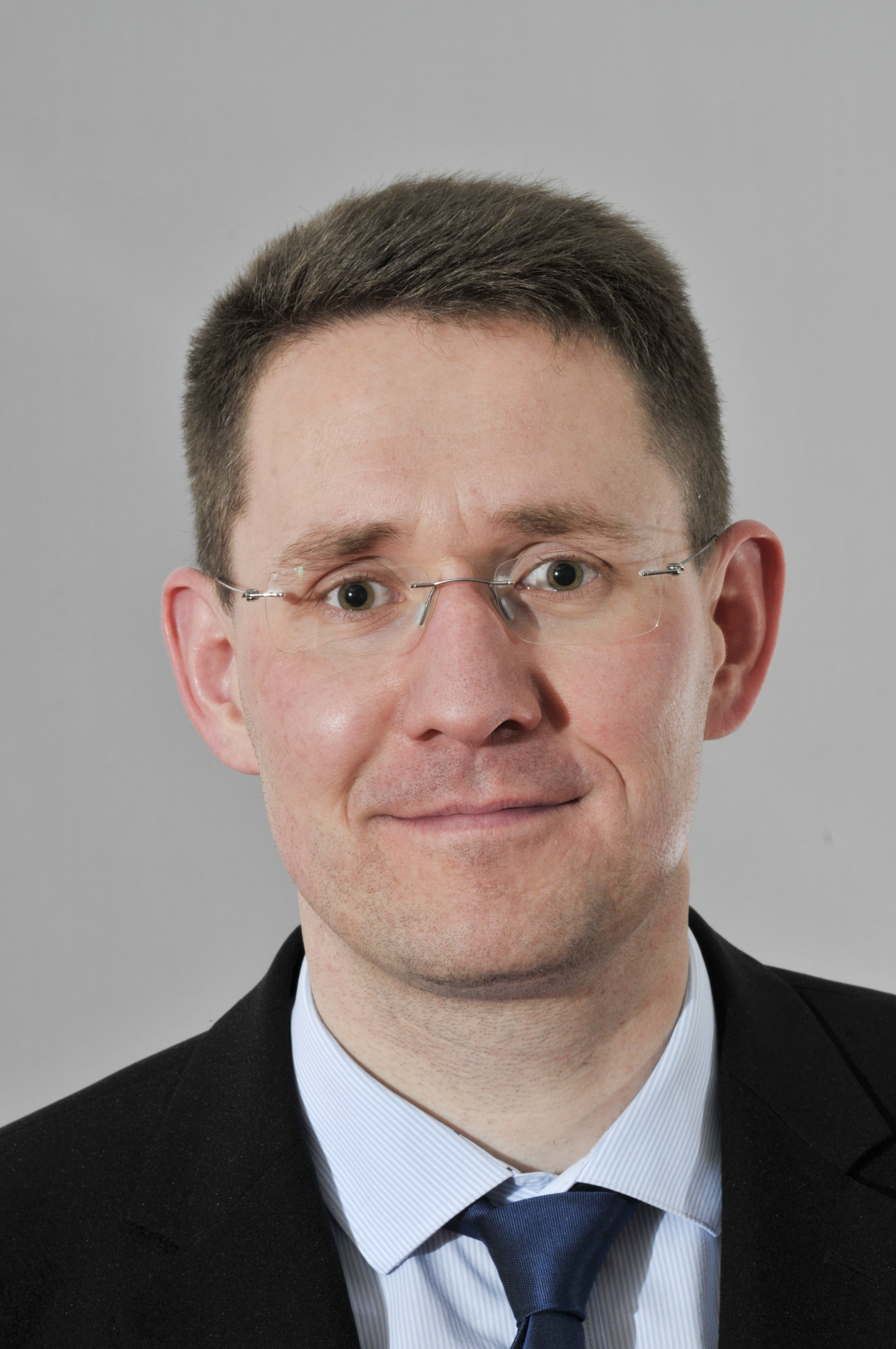
- Vida in 2016

Chairman of BVB/Freie Wähler
- Incumbent
- Assumed office 21 September 2011

Chairman of Bernau City Council
- Incumbent
- Assumed office July 2024

Member of Bernau City Council
- Incumbent
- Assumed office 2003

Member of the Landtag of Brandenburg
- In office October 2014 – September 2024

Personal details
- Born: December 18, 1983 (age 42) Schwedt/Oder, East Germany
- Party: BVB/Freie Wähler
- Other political affiliations: CDU (before 2004)

Péter Vida (born 18 December 1983) is a German politician (BVB/Freie Wähler). He was a member of the Landtag of Brandenburg from October 2014 to September 2024 and chairman of the Bernau City Council since July 2024.

== Life ==
After being born in Schwedt/Oder, Vida moved with his family to Nagykanizsa in Hungary at the age of four. Since 1994 he has lived in Bernau bei Berlin, where he graduated from the Paulus Praetorius Gymnasium. He studied law at the Free University of Berlin, completed his legal traineeship at the Brandenburg Higher Regional Court and has been admitted to the bar since 2010.

== Political career ==
Vida has been a member of the Bernau City Council since the 2003 local elections as a city councillor and chairman of the "BVB/Free Voters Bernau" faction (until September 2017 "Independent Faction"). In 2004, he was expelled from the Christian Democratic Union of Germany because he had run against the CDU in this election with his own state list. In 2008 and 2014, he was elected to the Barnim district council, where he has been chairman of the Brandenburg United Citizens' Movements/Free Voters faction since then. On 21 September 2011, Vida was also elected state chairman of the political association BVB/Free Voters. Most recently, he was re-elected state chairman at the state general meeting on 25 November 2023, with 93% of the vote.

In the election of the advisory board for Migration and Integration of the Barnim district in 2011, the Alliance of Independent Migrants, initiated by Péter Vida, became the strongest list with 45.4% of the votes cast. n the constitutive meeting of the advisory board for Migration and Integration, Vida was elected chairman of the Barnim district and representative in the Migration and Integration Council of the State of Brandenburg and confirmed in this position in December 2014. Since June 2012, Vida has also been Brandenburg's representative in the Integrationsbeirat. On 14 November 2017 the Alliance of Independent Migrants list won the election of the advisory board for Migration and Integration in the Barnim district with 73% of the votes and achieved 7 out of 9 seats. n the constitutive meeting of the committee, Vida was unanimously re-elected as chairman.

Vida ran in the Brandenburg state elections in 2009 und 2014 in the Barnim II state constituency. In the 2014 election, he also ran for BVB/Free Voters in third place on the state list. Because his party colleague Christoph Schulze won a direct mandate, the voters' association entered the Landtag of Brandenburg with three representatives, including Vida, due to the basic mandate clause valid in Brandenburg. Vida has been a member of the main committee here since December 2014.

In the local elections on 26 May 2019, Vida ran as the top candidate of BVB/Free Voters in Bernau. With 21.5% or 8 seats, the list became the strongest force in the city council for the first time.

In the 2019 Brandenburg state election, Vida ran as the top candidate of BVB/Free Voters and won the direct mandate in the Barnim II state constituency. In the local elections on 9 June 2024, BVB/Free Voters was able to defend its status as the strongest faction in the Bernau city council with 22.1% of the vote or 8 seats. In the constituent meeting on 4 July 2024, Vida was unanimously elected chairman of the Bernau city council.

In the 2024 Brandenburg state election, Vida was the top candidate for his party, but BVB/Free Voters suffered an electoral wipeout losing all their seats.
