= Sebastian Rüter =

German politician (born 1976)

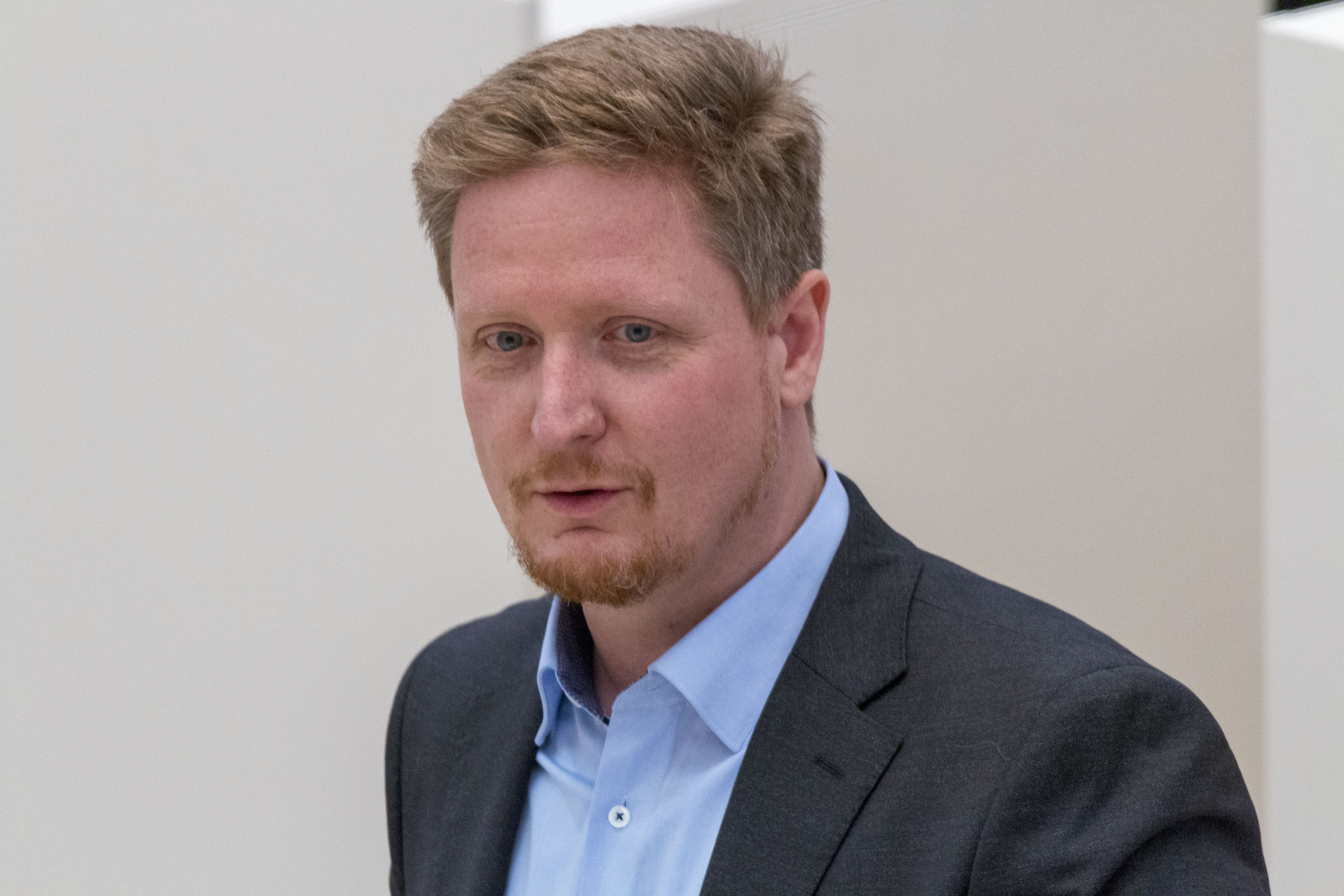
- Rüter in 2020

Member of the Landtag of Brandenburg
- Incumbent
- Assumed office 25 September 2019
- Preceded by: Sören Kosanke
- Constituency: Potsdam-Mittelmark IV

Personal details
- Born: 3 July 1976 (age 49)
- Party: Social Democratic Party (since 1992)

Sebastian Rüter (born 3 July 1976) is a German politician serving as a member of the Landtag of Brandenburg since 2019. He has served as chairman of the Social Democratic Party in Teltow since 2017.
