= Daniel Freiherr von Lützow =

German politician (born 1974)

Member of the Landtag of Brandenburg
- Incumbent
- Assumed office 25 September 2019

Personal details
- Born: 1974 (age 51–52) Zossen
- Party: Alternative for Germany (since 2013)

Daniel Freiherr von Lützow (born 1974 in Zossen) is a German politician serving as a member of the Landtag of Brandenburg since 2019. He has served as chairman of the Alternative for Germany in Teltow-Fläming since 2019.
