= Martina Maxi Schmidt =

German politician (born 1988)

Member of the Landtag of Brandenburg
- Incumbent
- Assumed office 17 October 2024

Personal details
- Born: 1988 (age 37–38) Brandenburg an der Havel
- Party: Social Democratic Party

Martina Maxi Schmidt (born 1988 in Brandenburg an der Havel) is a German politician serving as a member of the Landtag of Brandenburg since 2024. She has served as chairwoman of the Social Democratic Party in Bernau bei Berlin since 2022.
