= Benjamin Grimm (politician) =

German politician (born 1984)

Minister of Justice and Digitalization of Brandenburg
- Incumbent
- Assumed office 11 December 2024
- Minister-President: Dietmar Woidke
- Preceded by: Susanne Hoffmann

Personal details
- Born: 26 November 1984 (age 41)
- Party: Social Democratic Party (since 2005)

Benjamin Grimm (born 26 November 1984) is a German politician serving as minister of justice and digitalization of Brandenburg since 2024. He has been a member of the Landtag of Brandenburg since 2024.
