= Michael Schierack =

German politician (born 1966)

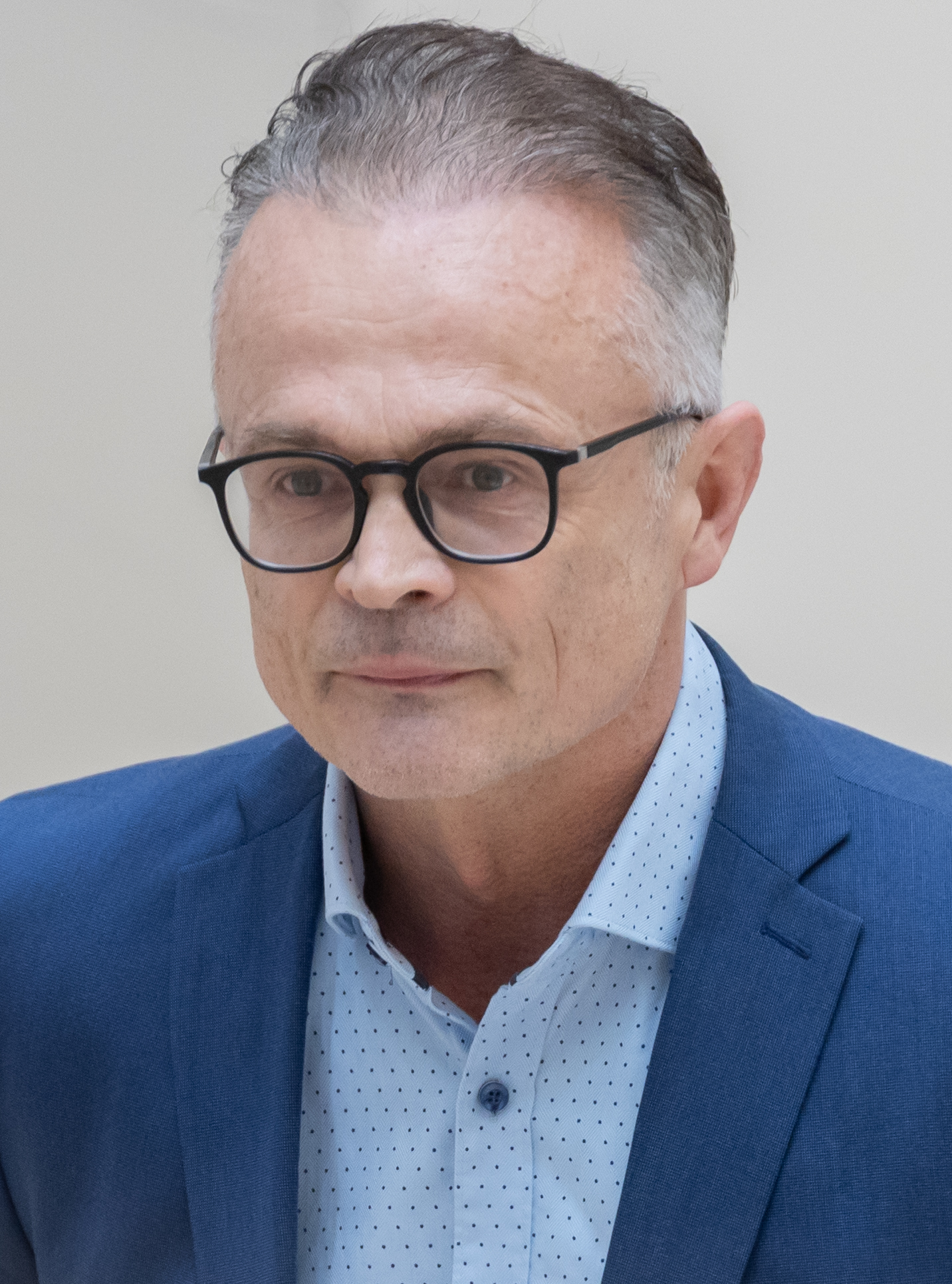
- Schierack in 2025

Member of the Landtag of Brandenburg
- Incumbent
- Assumed office 21 October 2009
- Constituency: Cottbus I (2014–2019)

Personal details
- Born: 12 November 1966 (age 59) Forst (Lausitz)
- Party: Christian Democratic Union (since 2000)

Michael Peter Schierack (born 12 November 1966 in Forst (Lausitz)) is a German politician serving as a member of the Landtag of Brandenburg since 2009. From 2012 to 2015, he served as chairman of the Christian Democratic Union in Brandenburg.
