= Red–red coalition =

Coalition government formation

In politics, a red–red coalition is a coalition government composed of social-democratic parties allying themselves with more radical democratic socialist or socialist parties, a coalition that spans the centre-left to the left or far left.

A specific example of a red–red coalition comes from the politics of Germany, formed from the Social Democratic Party of Germany (SPD) and The Left party or its predecessor, the Party of Democratic Socialism (PDS). Red–red coalitions form state-level governments in Brandenburg, and historically have governed Berlin (2001–2011), Mecklenburg-Vorpommern (1998–2006) and (as a SPD minority government tolerated by the PDS) Saxony-Anhalt (1994–2002).

== See also ==
- German governing coalitions
- Red–green alliance
- Red–red–green coalition
- Red–purple coalition
