= 2019 Brandenburg state election =

State election in Brandenburg, Germany

← 2014	1 September 2019	2024 →

All 88 seats of the Landtag of Brandenburg 45 seats needed for a majority
- Turnout: 1,265,106 (61.3%) ▲13.4 pp
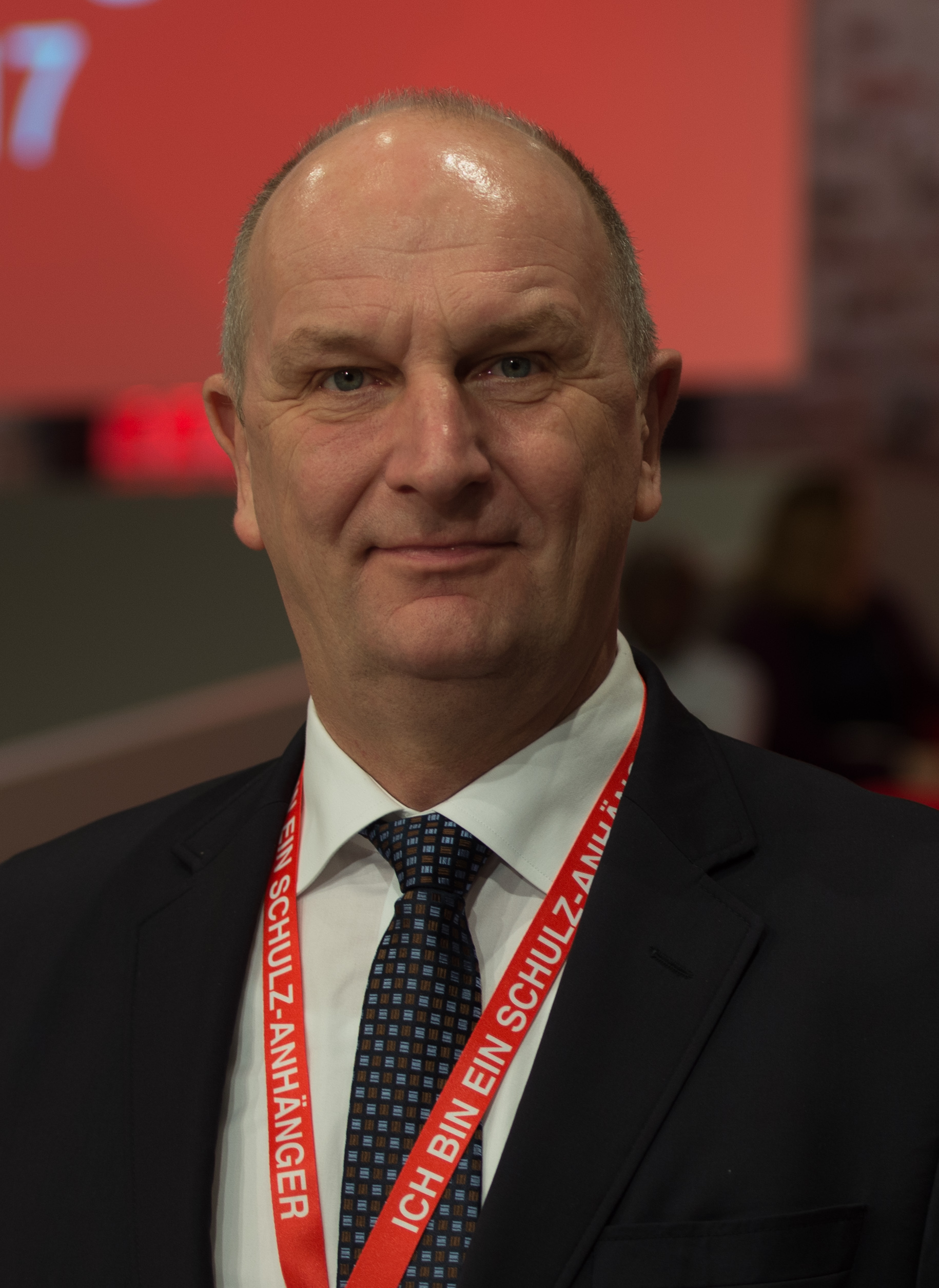

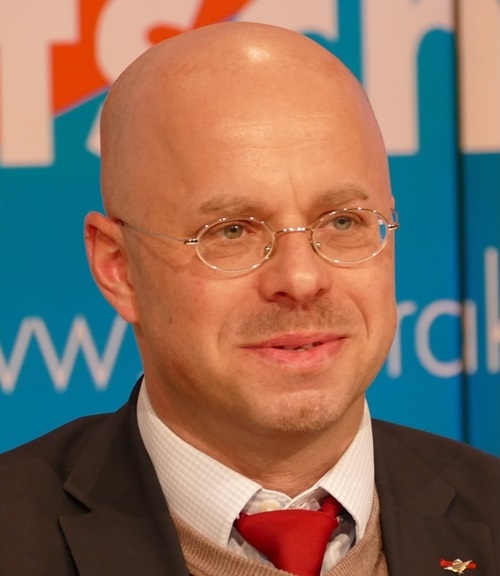

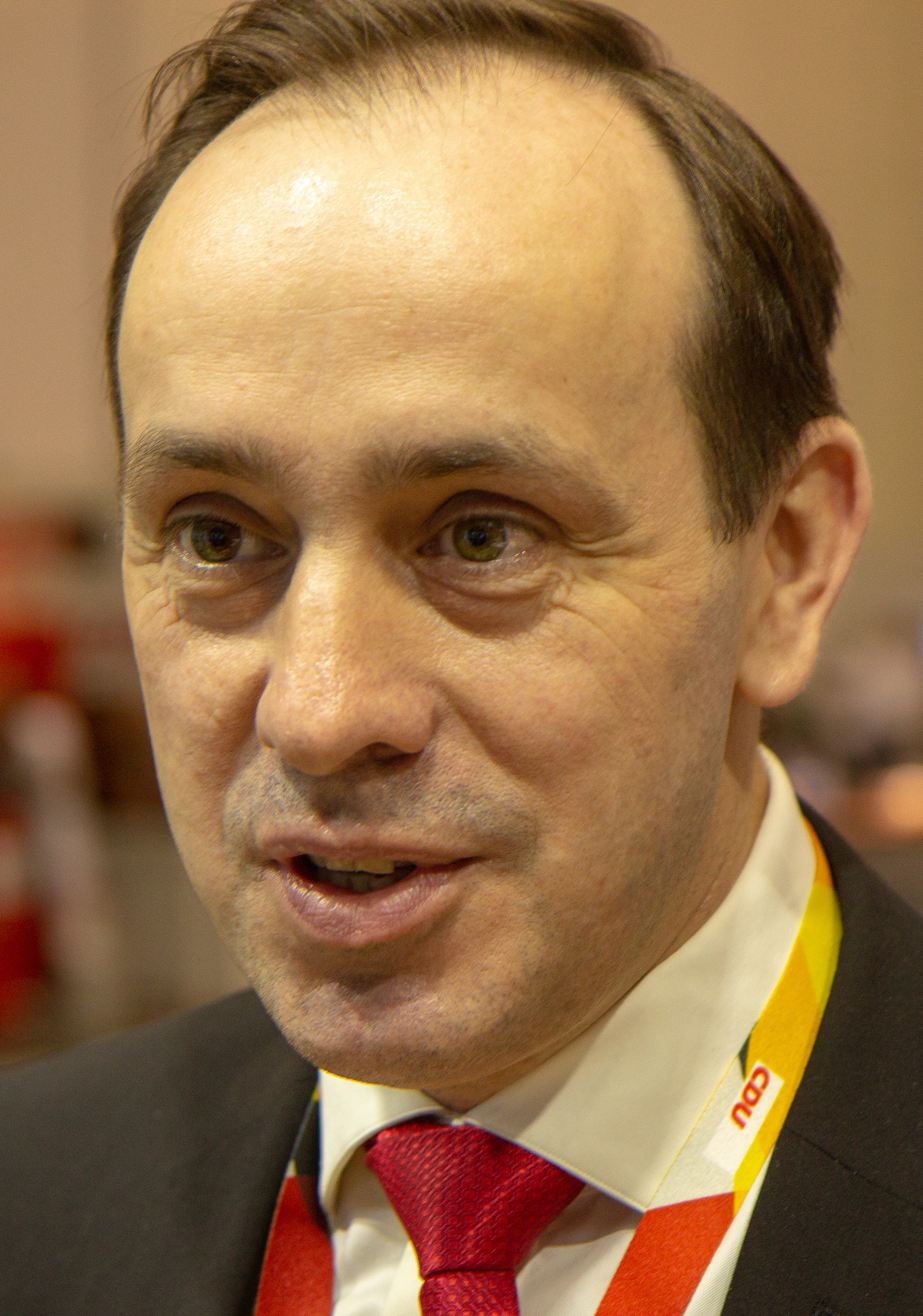

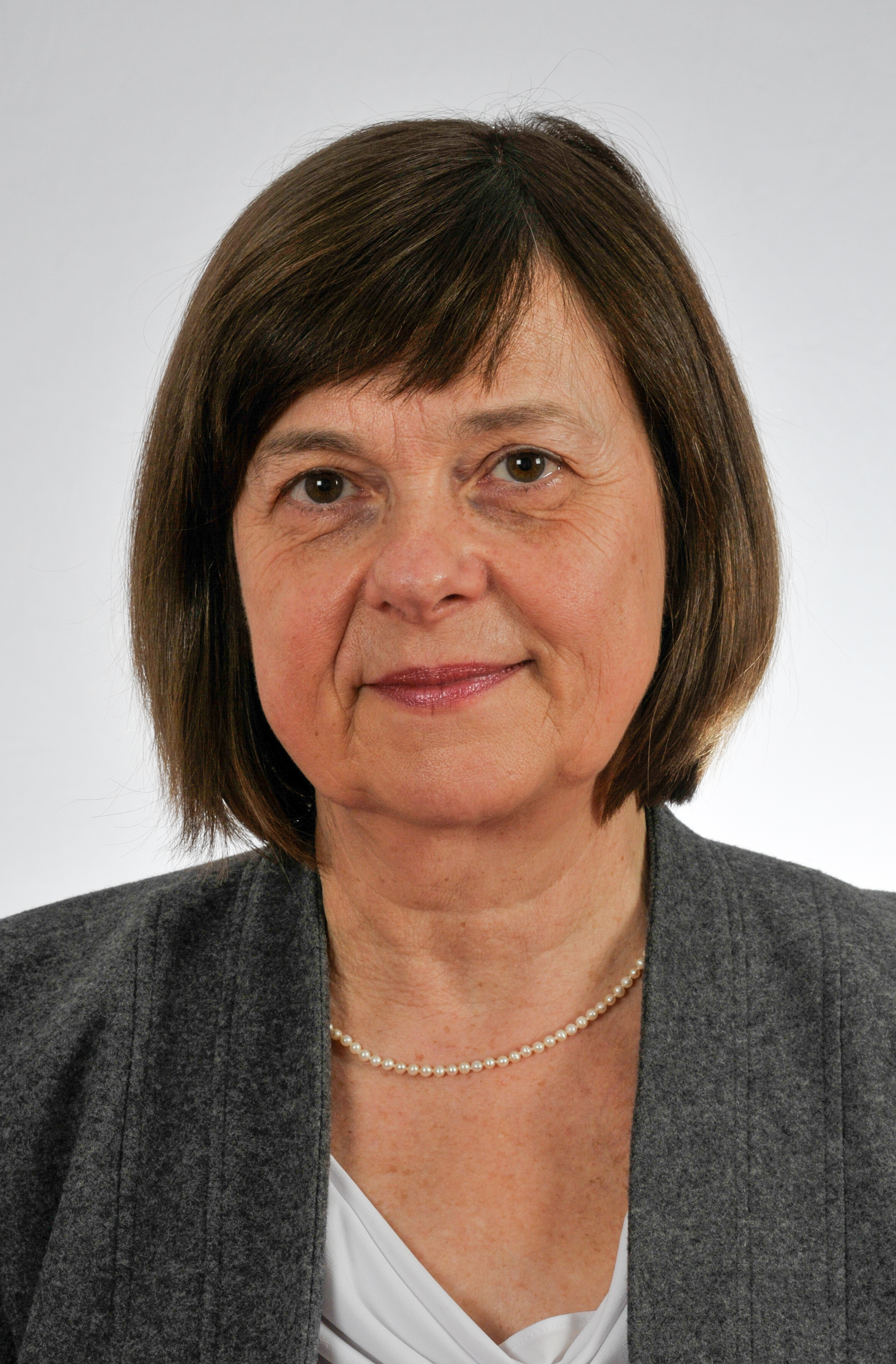

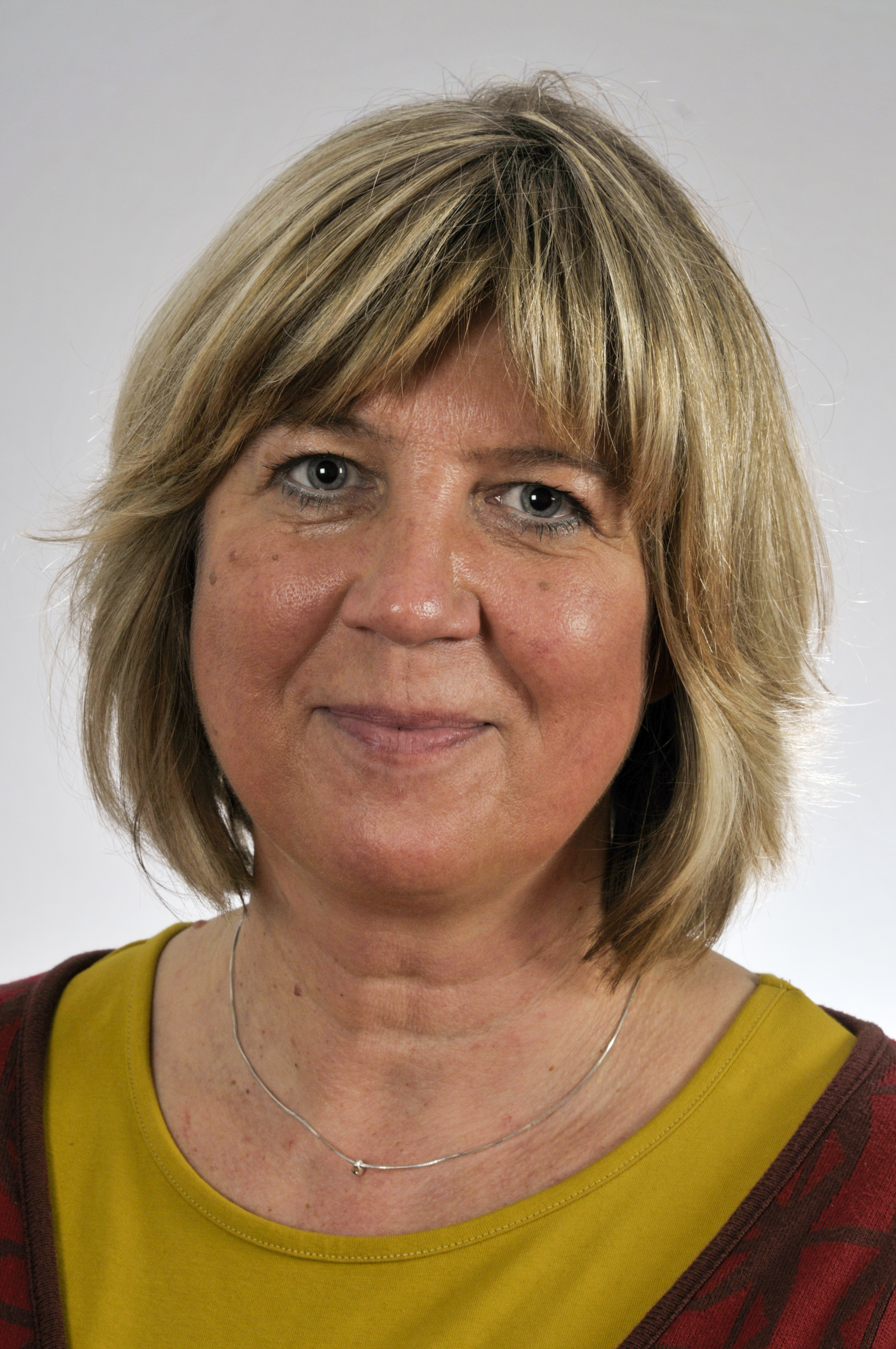

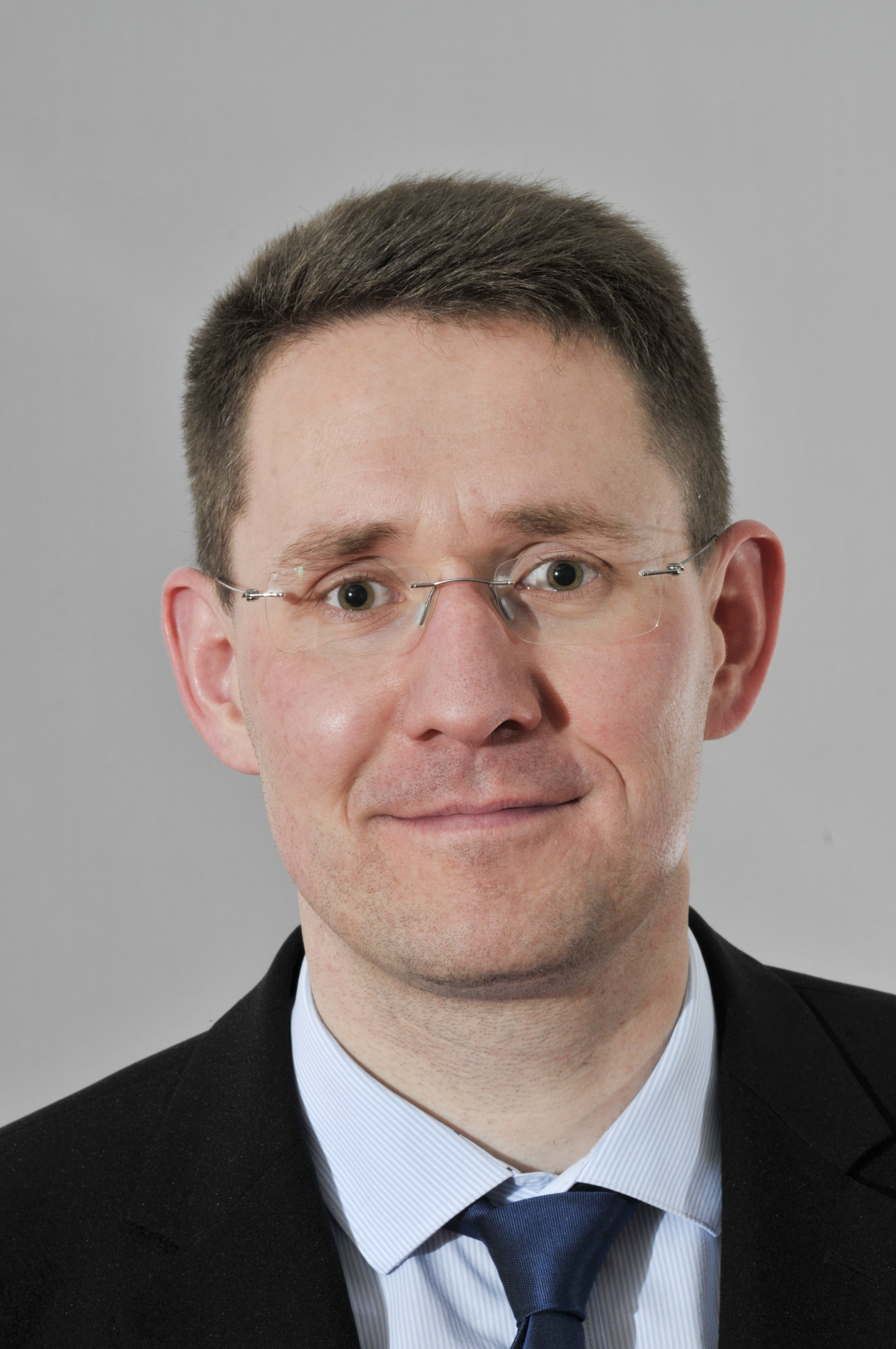
	First party	Second party	Third party
Leader	Dietmar Woidke	Andreas Kalbitz	Ingo Senftleben
Party	SPD	AfD	CDU
Leader's seat	Spree-Neiße I	State-wide party list	Oberspreewald-Lausitz I
Last election	30 seats, 31.9%	11 seats, 12.2%	21 seats, 23.0%
Seats won	25	23	15
Seat change	▼5	▲12	▼6
Popular vote	331,238	297,484	196,988
Percentage	26.2%	23.5%	15.6%
Swing	▼5.7 pp	▲11.3 pp	▼7.4 pp
	Fourth party	Fifth party	Sixth party
Leader	Ursula Nonnemacher	Kathrin Dannenberg	Péter Vida
Party	Greens	Left	BVB/FW
Leader's seat	State-wide party list	State-wide party list	Barnim II
Last election	6 seats, 6.2%	17 seats, 18.6%	3 seats, 2.7%
Seats won	10	10	5
Seat change	▲4	▼7	▲2
Popular vote	136,364	135,558	63,851
Percentage	10.8%	10.7%	5.0%
Swing	▲4.6 pp	▼7.9 pp	▲2.3 pp
- Winning candidates in the single-member constituencies, with list seats shown in the top right.
Government before election
Second Woidke cabinet
SPD–Left
Government after election
Third Woidke cabinet
SPD–CDU–Green

The 2019 Brandenburg state election was held on 1 September 2019 to elect the members of the 7th Landtag of Brandenburg. It took place on the same day as the 2019 Saxony state election. The outgoing government was a coalition of the Social Democratic Party (SPD) and The Left, led by Minister-President Dietmar Woidke.

The SPD, Left, and opposition Christian Democratic Union (CDU) suffered substantial losses. The SPD remained the largest party with 26% of votes, followed by the Alternative for Germany (AfD), which doubled its result to 23.5% and moved into second place. The CDU fell to third with 16%. The Greens improved to 11%, though they underperformed compared to prior opinion polling. The Left also recorded a result below expectations, falling from third to fifth place with 11%. The Brandenburg Free Voters (BVB/FW) narrowly passed the 5% electoral threshold and won five seats, up from three (as they received a "direct mandate", they would have goten their seats even with lower than 5%).

The incumbent government lost its majority. All parties ruled out cooperation with the AfD, and two possible coalitions were considered: a "Kenya coalition" of the SPD, CDU, and Greens which would hold 50 seats, and a "red-red-green" coalition of the SPD, Greens, and Left, which would hold 45 (a one-seat majority). On 16 November, both the SPD and CDU voted in favour of a Kenya coalition, followed by the Greens on 18 November. Woidke was re-elected Minister-President by the Landtag on 20 November.

== Background ==
Since German reunification, the SPD has been the strongest party in Brandenburg on a state level, and has held the office of Minister-President continuously.

The SPD and Left formed a coalition government after the 2009 state election, which was renewed after the 2014 state election. In the 2019 European Parliament election in Germany, AfD was the strongest party in Brandenburg on 19.9%, ahead of the CDU (18.0%) and SPD (17.2%).

== Electoral system ==
In principle, the Landtag consists of 88 members. 44 are elected by plurality vote in single-member constituencies (direct mandates), and the remainder are filled by party-list proportional representation. The seats are distributed according to the largest remainder method (Hare-Niemeyer method). Only parties whose share of second votes exceeds the 5% electoral threshold or which have won a direct mandate (the "basic mandate clause") are allocated seats. Overhang and leveling seats can expand the Landtag to a maximum size of 110 seats. This is detailed in the Brandenburg State Electoral Act.

According to the state constitution and the state election law, the election date must be a Sunday or a public holiday, at the earliest 57 months and at the latest 60 months after the beginning of the election period. In 2019, the date was set for 1 September 2019.

The minimum voting age is 16 years.

== Parties ==
The table below lists parties represented in the 6th Landtag of Brandenburg.

Name		Ideology	Leader(s)	2014 result	
Name		Ideology	Leader(s)	Votes (%)	Seats
SPD	Social Democratic Party of Germany; Sozialdemokratische Partei Deutschlands	Social democracy	Dietmar Woidke	31.9%	30 / 88
CDU	Christian Democratic Union of Germany; Christlich Demokratische Union Deutschlands	Christian democracy	Ingo Senftleben	23.0%	20 / 88
Linke	The Left; Die Linke	Democratic socialism	Kathrin Dannenberg	18.6%	17 / 88
AfD	Alternative for Germany; Alternative für Deutschland	German nationalism Right-wing populism	Andreas Kalbitz	12.2%	11 / 88
Grüne	Alliance 90/The Greens; Bündnis 90/Die Grünen	Green politics	Ursula Nonnemacher	6.2%	6 / 88
BVB/FW	Brandenburg United Civic Movements/Free Voters; Brandenburger Vereinigten Bürgerbewegungen/Freie Wähler	Regionalism	Péter Vida	2.7%	3 / 88

== Opinion polls ==

Polling firm	Fieldwork date	Sample size	SPD	CDU	Linke	AfD	Grüne	FDP	BVB/FW	Others	Lead
2019 state election	1 Sep 2019	–	26.2	15.6	10.7	23.5	10.8	4.1	5.0	4.1	2.7
Forschungsgruppe Wahlen	26–29 Aug 2019	1,653	22	16.5	14	21	14.5	5	4	3	1
Civey	31 Jul–28 Aug 2019	2,460	20.3	17.9	15.5	20.3	14.8	4.9	–	6.3	Tie
INSA	19–26 Aug 2019	1,019	21	17	15	21	14	5	5	2	Tie
Forschungsgruppe Wahlen	19–22 Aug 2019	1,112	21	18	14	20	14	5	4	4	1
Infratest dimap	19–21 Aug 2019	1,002	22	18	15	22	12	5	4	2	Tie
Civey	16 Jul–13 Aug 2019	2,981	18.2	17.1	14.7	21.0	17.2	5.5	–	6.3	3.2
Forsa	25 Jul–5 Aug 2019	1,009	17	18	14	21	16	5	4	5	3
Civey	19 Jun–17 Jul 2019	2,895	17.2	16.3	16.9	21.3	15.1	5.2	–	8.0	4.1
INSA	24 Jun–1 Jul 2019	1,001	19	18	16	19	16	6	3	3	Tie
Civey	15 May–12 Jun 2019	3,007	21.4	16.3	19.5	19.6	12.0	4.3	–	6.9	1.8
Infratest dimap	3–6 Jun 2019	1,000	18	17	14	21	17	5	4	4	3
INSA	13–28 May 2019	1,011	19	20	18	20	12	5	3	3	Tie
2019 European election	26 May 2019	–	17.2	18.0	12.3	19.9	12.3	4.4	2.2 (Note: Free Voters.)	13.7	1.9
Civey	19 Mar–16 Apr 2019	1,380	23.0	19.9	16.8	20.9	9.2	4.4	–	5.8	2.1
Infratest dimap	2–6 Apr 2019	1,000	22	20	16	19	12	5	–	6	2
Civey	End Jan–22 Feb 2019	5,955	21.8	22.1	20.0	18.8	7.0	4.4	–	5.9	0.3
INSA	28 Jan–4 Feb 2019	1,006	21	21	17	19	10	5	4	3	Tie
Forsa	17–20 Dec 2018	1,005	20	19	17	20	12	5	–	7	Tie
pmg	19 Nov–6 Dec 2018	1,006	23	21	18	21	10	3	–	4	2
Infratest dimap	12–17 Sep 2018	1,000	23	21	17	23	7	5	–	4	Tie
INSA	10–17 Aug 2018	1,048	23	18	18	21	8	5	4	3	2
Infratest dimap	11–16 Apr 2018	1,000	23	23	17	22	7	4	–	4	Tie
Infratest dimap	7–11 Nov 2017	1,005	23	22	17	20	6	7	–	5	1
Forsa	7–9 Nov 2017	1,002	25	22	18	18	6	5	–	6	3
2017 federal election	24 Sep 2017	–	17.6	26.7	17.2	20.2	5.0	7.1	1.2	5.1	6.5
Infratest dimap	15–19 Jun 2017	1,000	28	25	18	15	6	3	–	5	3
Forsa	9–13 Jan 2017	1,003	30	21	15	18	7	4	–	5	9
Infratest dimap	24–28 Nov 2016	1,000	30	25	17	16	6	–	–	6	5
Forsa	20–26 Sep 2016	1,001	30	17	17	20	6	4	–	6	10
Infratest dimap	19–23 May 2016	1,002	29	23	17	20	6	–	–	5	6
Forsa	14–17 Mar 2016	1,003	31	19	16	19	7	3	–	5	12
Forsa	9–17 Dec 2015	1,002	36	21	18	11	6	–	–	8	15
Infratest dimap	12–16 Nov 2015	1,000	33	23	19	13	6	–	–	6	10
Forsa	Sep 2015	1,002	35	24	20	7	7	–	–	7	11
Infratest dimap	5–8 Feb 2015	1,000	34	25	19	10	5	–	–	7	9
Forsa	Dec 2014	1,001	34	22	19	8	8	–	–	9	12
2014 state election	14 Sep 2014	–	31.9	23.0	18.6	12.2	6.2	1.5	2.7	5.5	8.9

== Results ==
By early afternoon, significantly more people had voted than at the same time in the 2014 election. According to the state election director, 31.3% of voters cast their ballots by 2:00 PM. At the time in 2014, the figure was only 22.4%.

Party	Votes	%	+/-	Seats	+/-	Seats %
Social Democratic Party (SPD)	331,238	26.2	▼5.7	25	▼5	28.4
Alternative for Germany (AfD)	297,484	23.5	▲11.3	23	▲12	26.1
Christian Democratic Union (CDU)	196,988	15.6	▼7.4	15	▼6	17.0
Alliance 90/The Greens (Grüne)	136,364	10.8	▲4.6	10	▲4	11.4
The Left (Linke)	135,558	10.7	▼7.9	10	▼7	11.4
Brandenburg United Civic Movements/Free Voters (BVB/FW)	63,851	5.05	▲2.3	5	▲2	5.7
Free Democratic Party (FDP)	51,660	4.1	▲2.6	0	±0	0
Human Environment Animal Protection Party	32,959	2.6	▲2.6	0	±0	0
Pirate Party Germany (Piraten)	8,712	0.7	▼0.8	0	±0	0
Others	10,292	0.8		0	±0	0
Total	1,265,106	100.0		88	±0	
Voter turnout		61.3	▲13.4			

Popular Vote
SPD	26.18%
AfD	23.51%
CDU	15.57%
B'90/GRÜNE	10.78%
DIE LINKE	10.72%
BVB/FW	5.05%
FDP	4.08%
TIER	2.61%
Other	1.50%

Landtag seats
SPD	28.41%
AfD	26.14%
CDU	17.05%
B'90/GRÜNE	11.36%
DIE LINKE	11.36%
BVB/FW	5.68%

SPD vote

AfD vote

CDU vote

Green vote

Linke vote

FW vote

FDP vote

== Government formation ==
The governing SPD and Die Linke both suffered losses, bringing an end to their coalition. Incumbent Minister-President Woidke (SPD) invited all parties except AfD to coalition negotiations as his party remained the largest bloc. The CDU expressed interest in joining a so-called "Kenya coalition" with SPD and Greens, which would have 50 seats, and reiterated their refusal to govern with AfD. Woidke confirmed he called CDU leader Senftleben on election day to begin discussions, but expressed reservations about the party's poor performance under pressure from the right. He also did not rule out the possibility of a red-red-green coalition with Die Linke and Greens, which would have a bare majority of 45 seats. Greens leader Nonnemacher expressed willingness to participate in either coalition, but made it clear her party would bring its own policy goals to the table and refuse to merely prop up the existing red-red coalition.

On November 16, both the CDU and SPD voted in favor of a "Kenya coalition." The Greens approved the coalition on the 18th; Woidke was duly voted in for his second term as Minister-President two days later by a count of 47 to 37 with 3 abstentions. The coalition commanded 50 seats.
