= 2014 Brandenburg state election =

State election in Brandenburg, Germany

- 14 September 2014

All 88 seats of the Landtag of Brandenburg 45 seats needed for a majority
- Turnout: 987,299 (47.9%) ▼19.1%
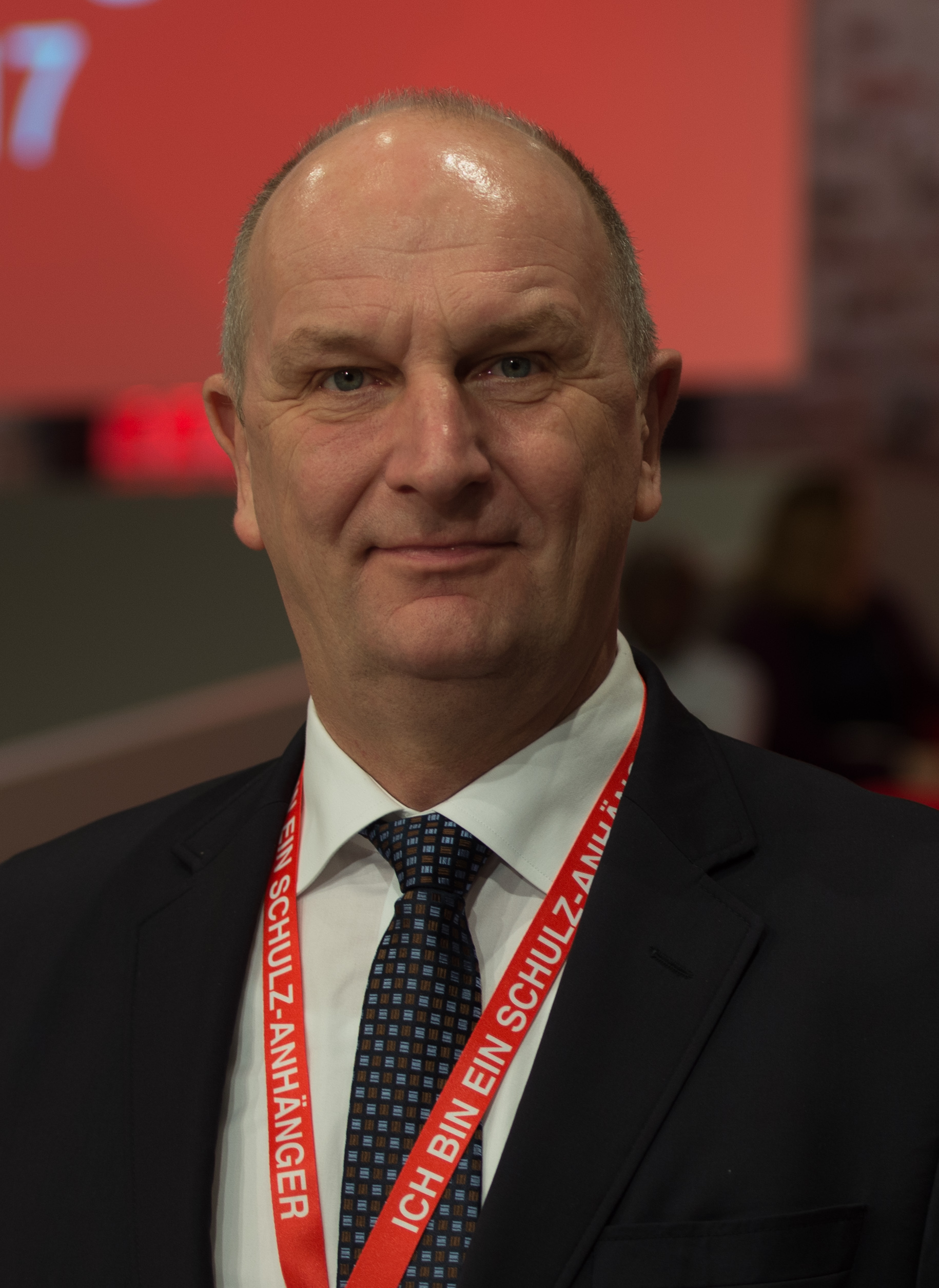

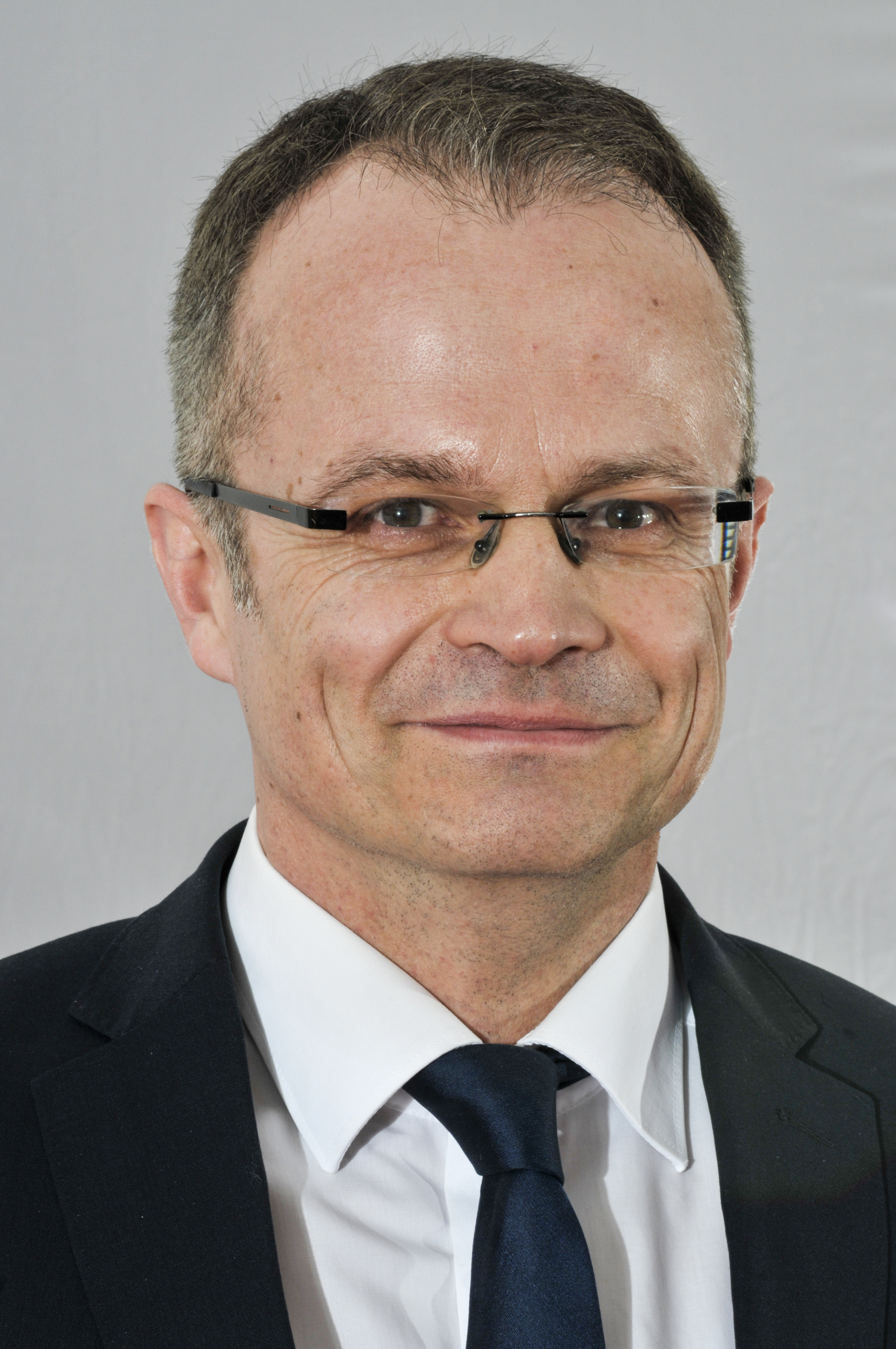

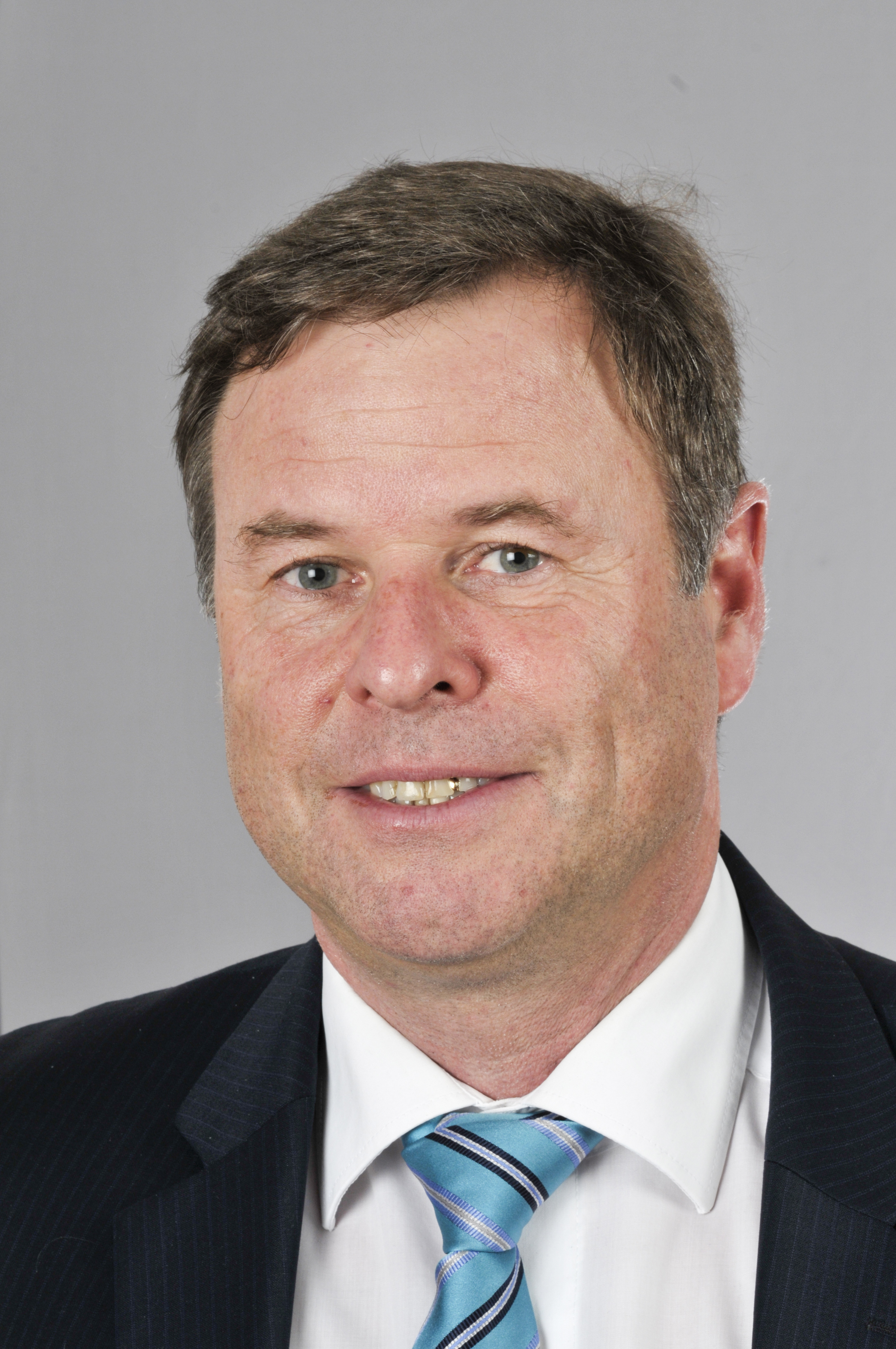

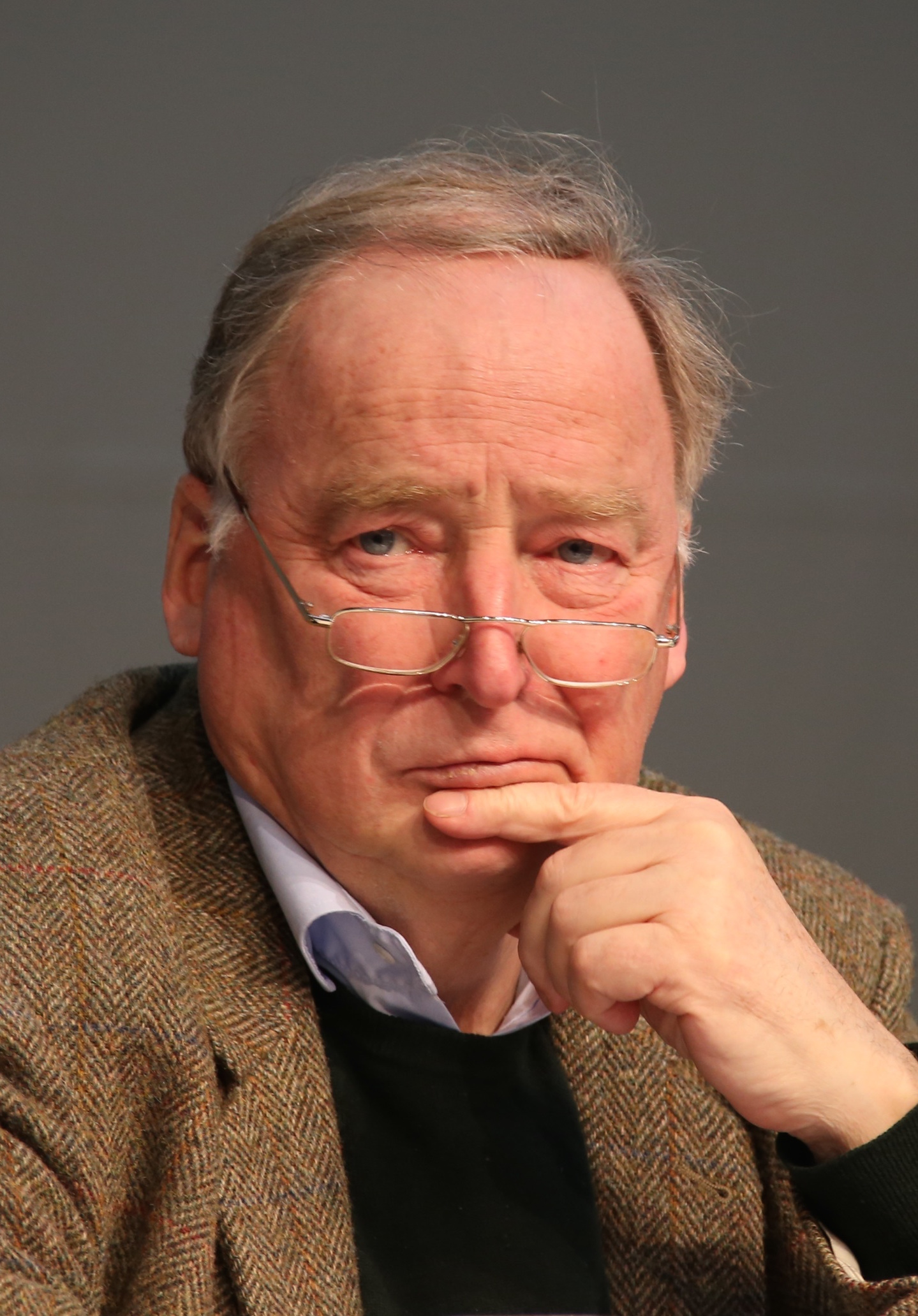

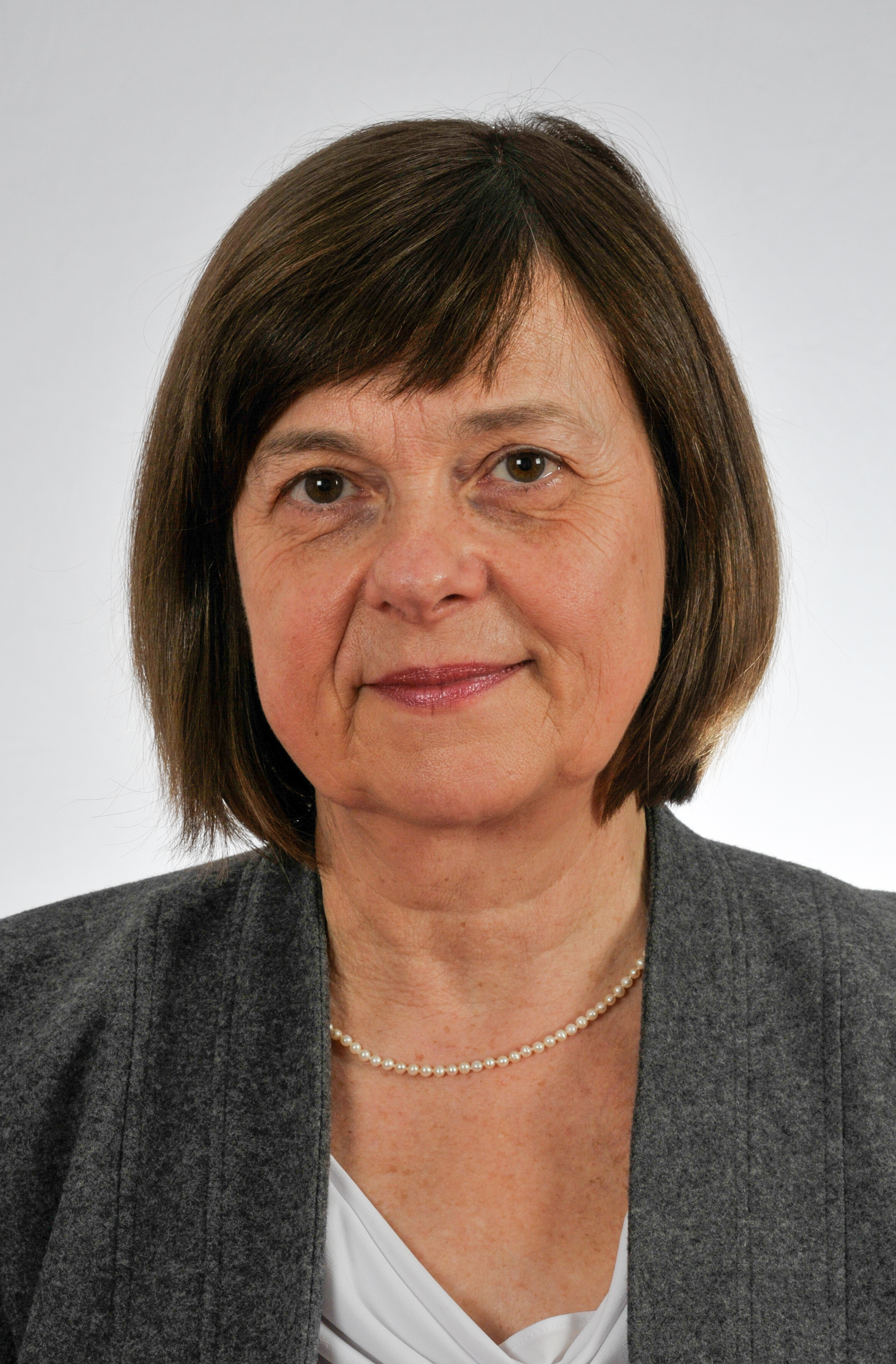
	First party	Second party	Third party
Leader	Dietmar Woidke	Michael Schierack	Christian Görke
Party	SPD	CDU	Left
Leader's seat	Spree-Neiße I	Cottbus I	Ostprignitz-Ruppin III/Havelland II
Last election	31 seats, 33.0%	19 seats, 19.8%	26 seats, 27.2%
Seats won	30	21	17
Seat change	▼1	▲2	▼9
Popular vote	315,177	226,844	183,172
Percentage	31.9%	23.0%	18.6%
Swing	▼1.1%	▲3.2%	▼8.6%
	Fourth party	Fifth party	Sixth party
			BVB/FW
Leader	Alexander Gauland	Ursula Nonnemacher	Christoph Schulze
Party	AfD	Greens	BVB/FW
Leader's seat	State-wide party list	State-wide party list	Teltow-Fläming III
Last election	Did not exist	5 seats, 5.7%	0 seats, 1.7%
Seats won	11	6	3
Seat change	▲11	▲1	▲3
Popular vote	119,989	60,762	26,332
Percentage	12.2%	6.2%	2.7%
Swing	New party	▲0.5%	▲1.0%
- Results for the single-member constituencies
Government before election
Woidke I (Note: Replaced Platzeck III cabinet in August 2013.)
SPD–The Left
Elected Government
Woidke II
SPD–The Left

The 2014 Brandenburg state election was held on 14 September 2014 to elect the members of the 6th Landtag of Brandenburg. The incumbent coalition government of the Social Democratic Party (SPD) and The Left led by Minister-President Dietmar Woidke retained its majority and continued in office.

== Parties ==
The table below lists parties represented in the 5th Landtag of Brandenburg.

Name		Ideology	Leader(s)	2009 result	
Name		Ideology	Leader(s)	Votes (%)	Seats
SPD	Social Democratic Party of Germany; Sozialdemokratische Partei Deutschlands	Social democracy	Dietmar Woidke	33.0%	31 / 88
Linke	The Left; Die Linke	Democratic socialism	Christian Görke	27.2%	26 / 88
CDU	Christian Democratic Union of Germany; Christlich Demokratische Union Deutschlands	Christian democracy	Michael Schierack	19.8%	19 / 88
FDP	Free Democratic Party; Freie Demokratische Partei	Classical liberalism	Andreas Büttner	7.2%	7 / 88
Grüne	Alliance 90/The Greens; Bündnis 90/Die Grünen	Green politics	Ursula Nonnemacher	5.7%	5 / 88

== Opinion polling ==
Polling firm	Fieldwork date	Sample size	SPD	Linke	CDU	FDP	Grüne	AfD	Others	Lead
2014 state election	14 Sep 2014	–	31.9	18.6	23.0	1.5	6.2	12.2	6.6	8.9
Forschungsgruppe Wahlen	10–11 Sep 2014	1,062	32.5	20	24	–	5.5	9.5	8.5	8.5
Infratest dimap	2–4 Sep 2014	1,003	31	22	24	2	6	9	6	7
Forschungsgruppe Wahlen	1–3 Sep 2014	1,012	33	21	25	–	6	8	7	8
Infratest dimap	22–26 Aug 2014	1,001	33	21	27	2	5	6	6	6
Forsa	11–18 Aug 2014	1,002	34	22	23	3	6	6	6	11
INSA	23 Jul–1 Aug 2014	500	34	22	25	3	5	5	6	9
Infratest dimap	30 May–2 Jun 2014	1,001	30	23	28	2	6	6	5	2
Emnid	24 Feb–5 Mar 2014	1,002	32	25	24	3	6	5	?	7
Forsa	11–19 Dec 2013	1,001	34	25	23	4	5	4	5	9
Infratest dimap	28 Nov–2 Dec 2013	1,000	32	22	30	2	6	3	5	2
Infratest dimap	23–26 Aug 2013	1,002	33	20	30	3	6	3	5	3
GMS	12–16 Aug 2013	1,006	35	20	27	3	10	–	5	8
Infratest dimap	24–27 May 2013	1,001	35	21	27	2	9	–	6	8
Emnid	21 Jan–1 Feb 2013	1,000	36	22	23	3	8	–	8	13
Forsa	17–19 Dec 2012	758	36	24	22	3	7	–	8	14
Infratest dimap	17–19 Sep 2012	1,000	39	22	23	2	7	–	7	16
GMS	21–23 Aug 2012	1,006	35.1	20.0	24.5	3.0	7.6	–	9.9	10.6
Infratest dimap	16–20 Mar 2012	1,000	37	22	21	3	7	–	10	15
Infratest Politikforschung	13–26 Feb 2012	1,001	38	21	23	2	7	–	4	15
Emnid	16–25 Jan 2012	1,002	34	21	24	2	8	–	11	10
Infratest dimap	6–11 Dec 2011	1,004	35	20	25	3	8	–	9	10
Infratest dimap	18–22 Aug 2011	1,003	35	22	22	3	11	–	7	13
Infratest Politikforschung	28 Feb–6 Mar 2011	1,000	35	24	24	8	8	–	6	11
Infratest dimap	16–20 Sep 2010	1,000	31	26	21	4	12	–	6	5
Infratest Politikforschung	15–24 Mar 2010	1,000	34	28	21	5	8	–	4	6
Infratest dimap	4–8 Feb 2010	1,002	31	27	22	6	8	–	6	4
Infratest dimap	1–2 Dec 2009	1,000	31	23	25	7	7	–	7	6
2009 state election	27 Sep 2009	–	33.0	27.2	19.8	7.2	5.6	–	7.1	5.8

== Election result ==
The Brandenburg United Civic Movements/Free Voters entered the Landtag despite falling short of the 5% electoral threshold because of the "basic mandate clause" in electoral law, which exempts parties that win at least one direct mandate from the threshold. The BVB/FW leader Christoph Schulze won Teltow-Fläming III, situated south of Berlin, with 27% of first votes. His success was attributed to discontent with the new Berlin Brandenburg Airport in this area, which lies in the designated approach corridor. Schulze's advocacy of a ban on night flights had been the reason for his defection from the ruling SPD (which he had represented in parliament since 1990) to the BVB/FW.

Summary of the 14 September 2014 election results for the Landtag of Brandenburg
Party	Votes	%	+/-	Seats	+/-	Seats %
Social Democratic Party (SPD)	313,177	31.9	▼1.1	30	▼1	34.1
Christian Democratic Union (CDU)	226,844	23.0	▲3.2	21	▲2	23.9
The Left (Linke)	183,172	18.6	▼8.6	17	▼9	19.3
Alternative for Germany (AfD)	119,989	12.2	New	11	New	12.5
Alliance 90/The Greens (Grüne)	60,762	6.2	▲0.5	6	▲1	6.8
Brandenburg United Civic Movements/Free Voters (BVB/FW)	26,332	2.7	▲1.0	3	▲3	3.4
National Democratic Party (NPD)	21,619	2.2	▼1.5	0	±0	0
Pirate Party Germany (Piraten)	14,593	1.5	▲1.5	0	±0	0
Free Democratic Party (FDP)	14,389	1.5	▼5.7	0	▼7	0
Others	4,422	0.4		0	±0	0
Total	987,299	100.0		88	±0	
Voter turnout		47.9	▼19.1			

Popular Vote
SPD	31.92%
CDU	22.98%
DIE LINKE	18.55%
AfD	12.15%
B'90/GRÜNE	6.15%
BVB/FW	2.67%
NPD	2.19%
PIRATEN	1.48%
FDP	1.46%
Other	0.45%

Landtag seats
SPD	34.09%
CDU	23.86%
DIE LINKE	19.32%
AfD	12.50%
B'90/GRÜNE	6.82%
BVB/FW	3.41%

SPD vote

CDU vote

Linke vote

AfD vote

Green vote

FW vote

NPD vote
