= Brandenburg United Civic Movements/Free Voters =

Brandenburg United Civic Movements/Free Voters Brandenburger Vereinigte Bürgerbewegungen/Freie Wähler
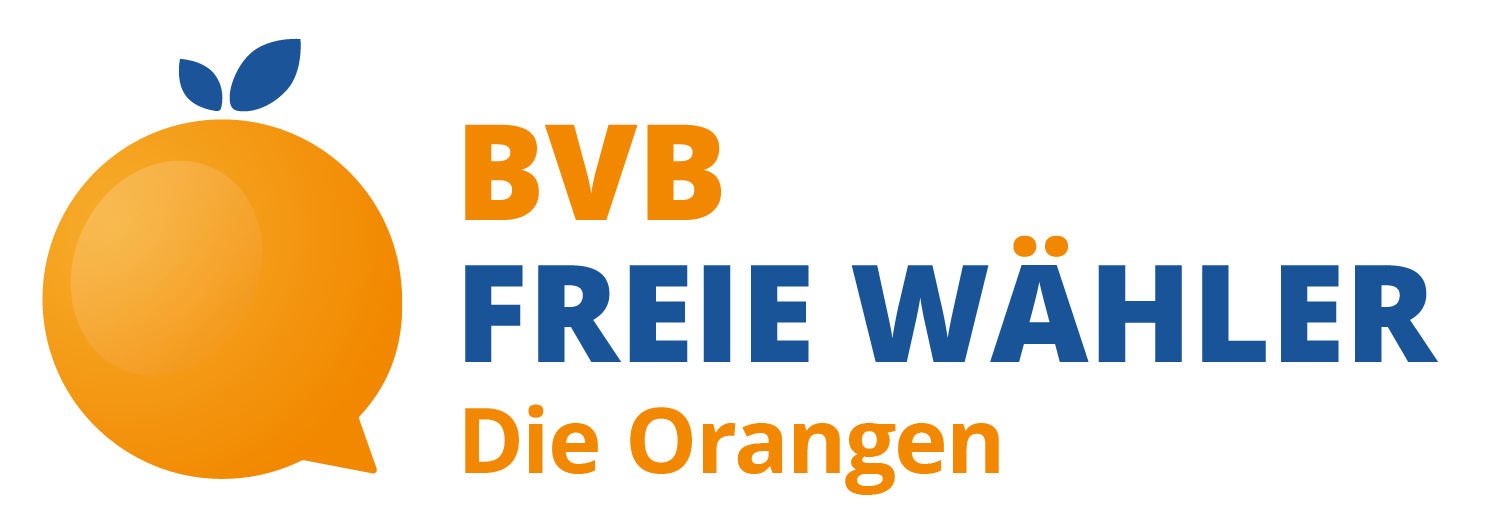
- Regional Chairman: Péter Vida
- Deputy Chairpersons: Ilona Nicklisch; Bernd Albers; Heika Selka
- Founded: 2008
- Headquarters: Jahnstraße 52; 16321 Bernau bei Berlin, Brandenburg
- Ideology: Regionalism
- Colours: Orange and blue
- Landtag of Brandenburg: 0 / 88

Website
- www.bvb-fw.de

The Brandenburg United Civic Movements/Free Voters (BVB/Free Voters; German: Brandenburger Vereinigte Bürgerbewegungen/Freie Wähler, BVB/FW), also known as Die Orangen (German for The Oranges) since 2023, is a political party in Brandenburg in eastern Germany. The party was co-founded in 2008 by Péter Vida, who serves as chairman. It cooperates with the federal Free Voters association, but is not a member. The party describes itself as "a statewide association of independent municipal voter groups and citizens' initiatives in the state of Brandenburg".

The BVB/FW is active on a local and state level. Its first major success came in the 2014 Brandenburg state election, where it won 2.7% of votes cast and three seats due to the victory of Christoph Schulze, a former SPD member of the Landtag, in his constituency of Teltow-Fläming III. In the 2019 Brandenburg state election, the BVB/FW won 5.05% of the state vote and five seats. Chairman Péter Vida also won the constituency of Barnim II.

== Election results ==
=== Landtag of Brandenburg ===
Year	Votes	%	Seats	+/–
2009	23,296	1.7 (#7)	0 / 88	
2014	26,332	2.7 (#6)	3 / 88	▲3
2019	63,851	5.0 (#6)	5 / 88	▲2
2024	38,596	2.6 (#7)	0 / 88	▼5
