= Plus Brandenburg =

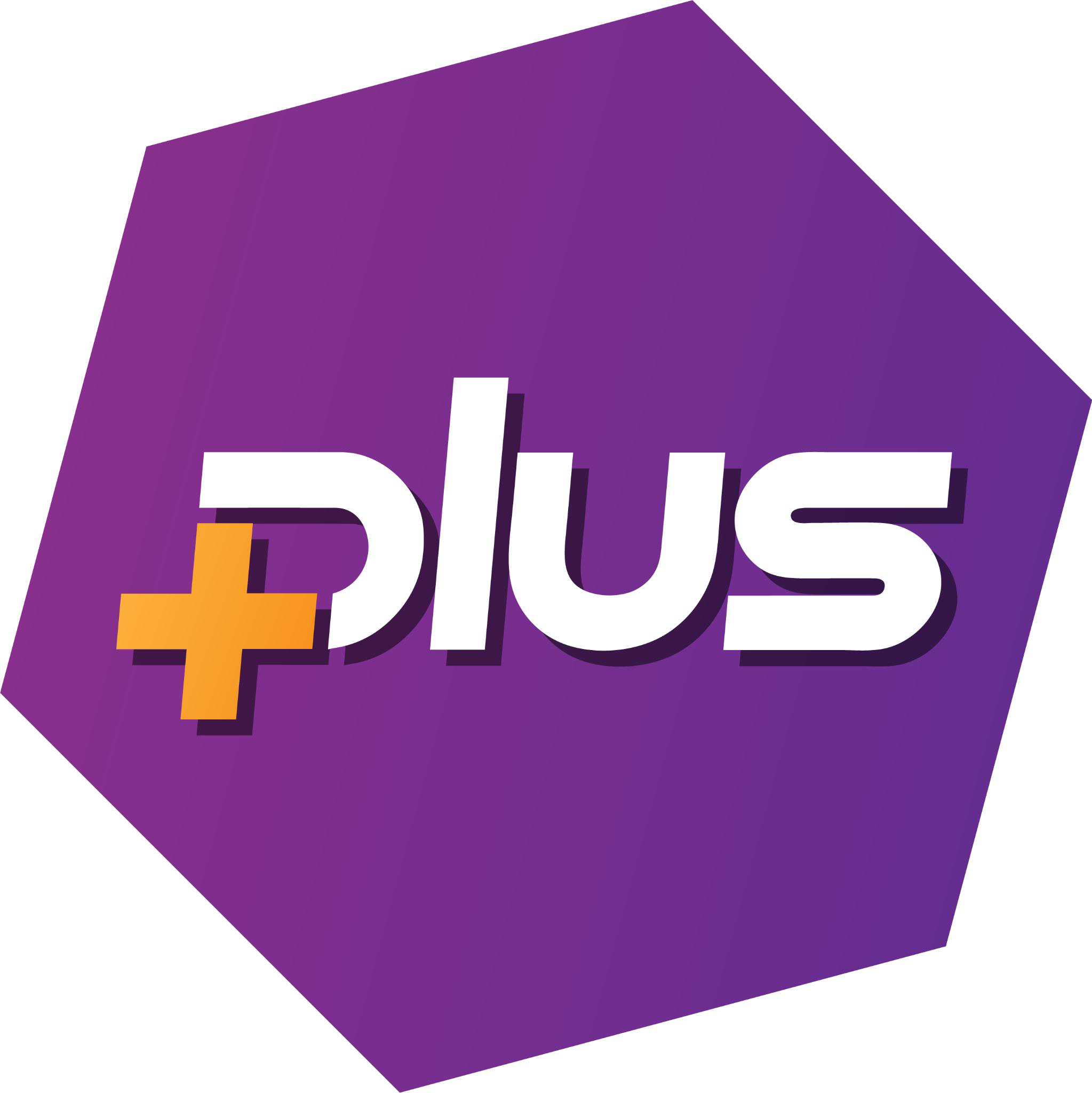
- Abbreviation: Plus
- List lead candidates: Thomas Bennühr (Pirates); Martin Franke (ÖDP); Thomas Löb (Volt)
- Founded: 14 November 2023
- Registered: 9 August 2024
- Headquarters: Berliner Str. 109b 16515 Oranienburg
- Ideology: Social liberalism Pro-Europeanism; Factions: Pirate politics Christian left European Federalism; Pan-Europeanism
- Alliance members: Pirate Party; Ecological Democratic Party; Volt Germany
- Colours: Purple; Orange
- Slogan: "Your Plus for Brandenburg!" (German: "Dein Plus für Brandenburg!")
- Landtag of Brandenburg: 0 / 88

Website
- plusbrandenburg.de

Plus Brandenburg is a German electoral alliance (list association) of the Pirate Party, Ecological Democratic Party and Volt Germany parties. Plus Brandenburg ran for the first time in the 2024 Brandenburg state election, but received less than one percent of the vote.

== History ==
In November 2023, the Pirate Party, Ecological Democratic Party and Volt Germany announced that they would run in the Brandenburg state election as part of the Plus Brandenburg electoral alliance. For this purpose, the parties formed a list association, which is currently only possible in the state of Brandenburg, in accordance with Section 22 of the Brandenburg State Election Law. On 9 August 2024, the list association was approved by the State Election Committee to participate in the state election after it had submitted the required number of supporting signatures. The list association ran in the state elections with a state list consisting of 17 candidates and with direct candidates in a total of twelve of the 44 Brandenburg constituencies.

According to the final results, the list alliance received 13,584 second votes (0.9%), less than the sum of second votes for the Pirate Party (0.7%) and the ÖDP (0.6%) combined in 2019.
