= 2024 Brandenburg state election =

German state election

- 22 September 2024

All 88 seats of the Landtag of Brandenburg 45 seats needed for a majority
- Turnout: 1,513,638 (72.9%) ▲11.6 pp
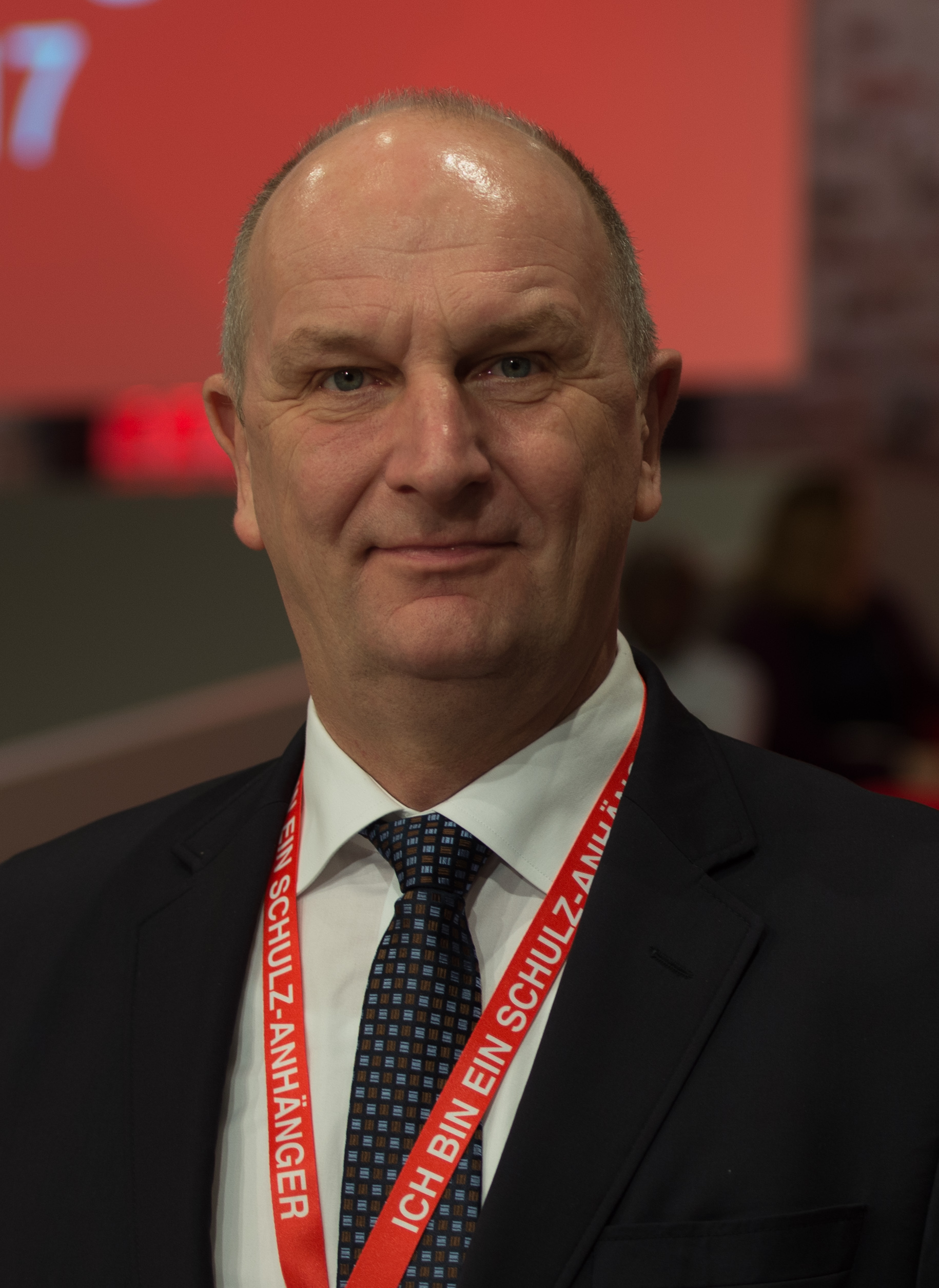

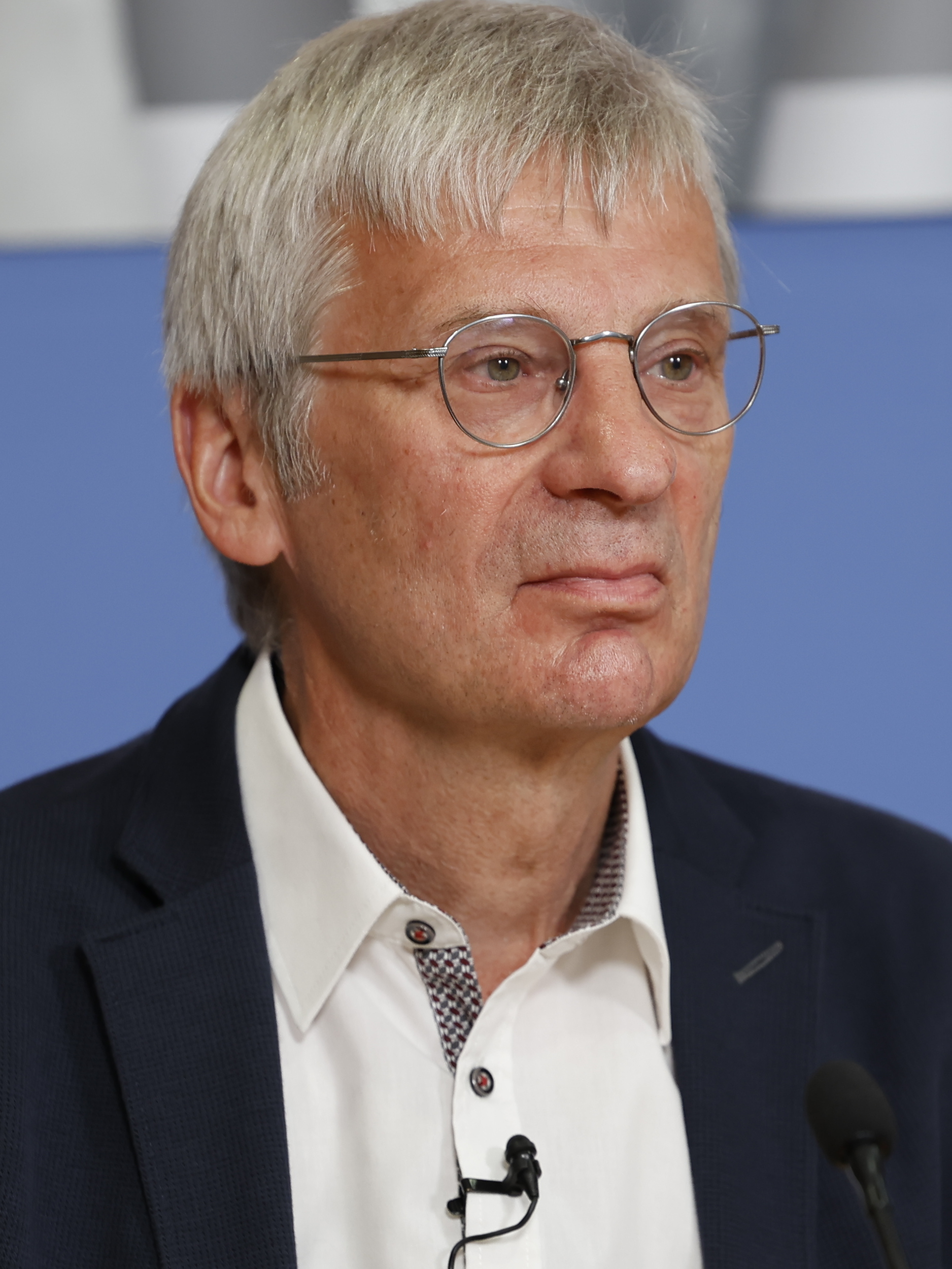

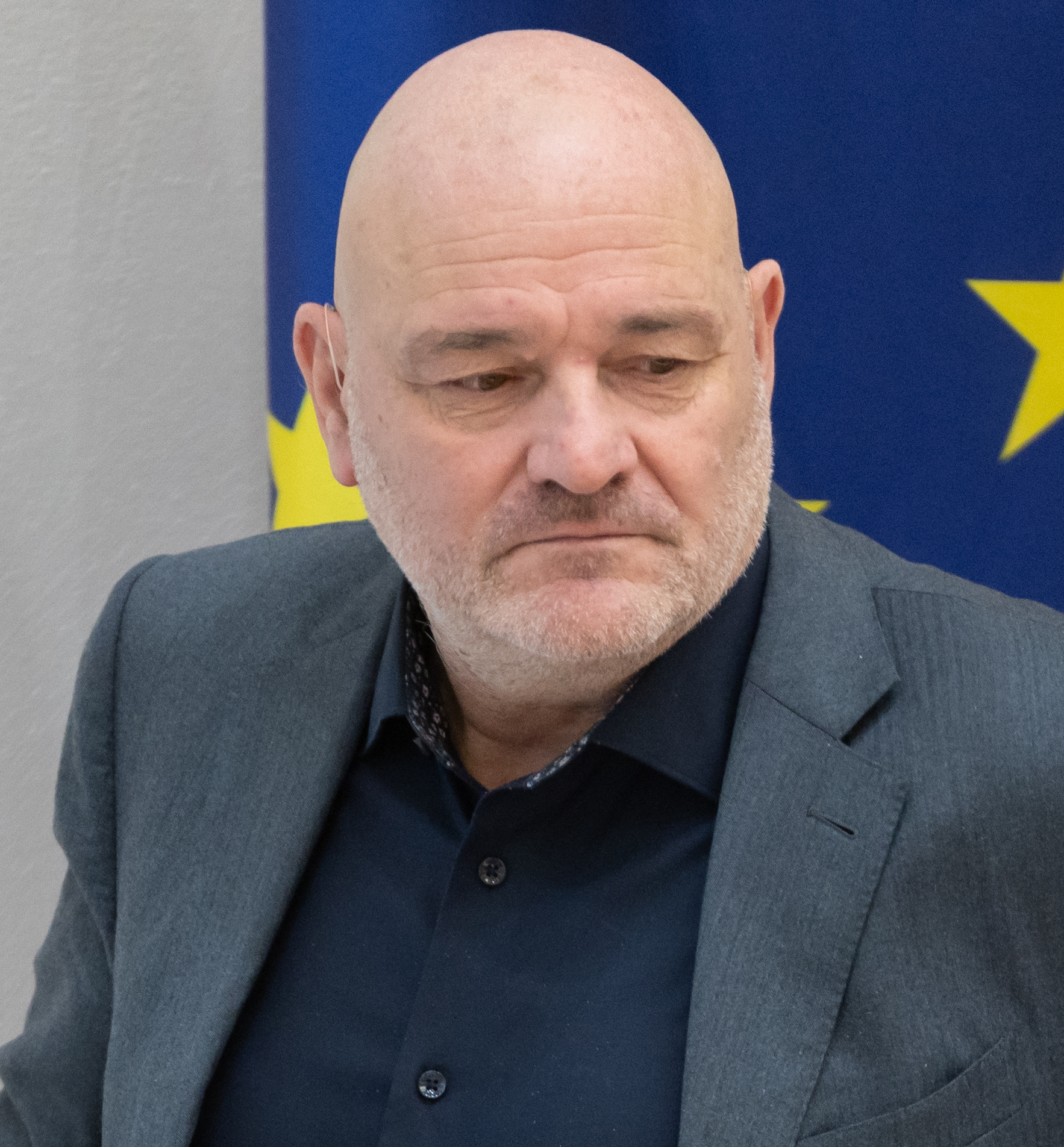

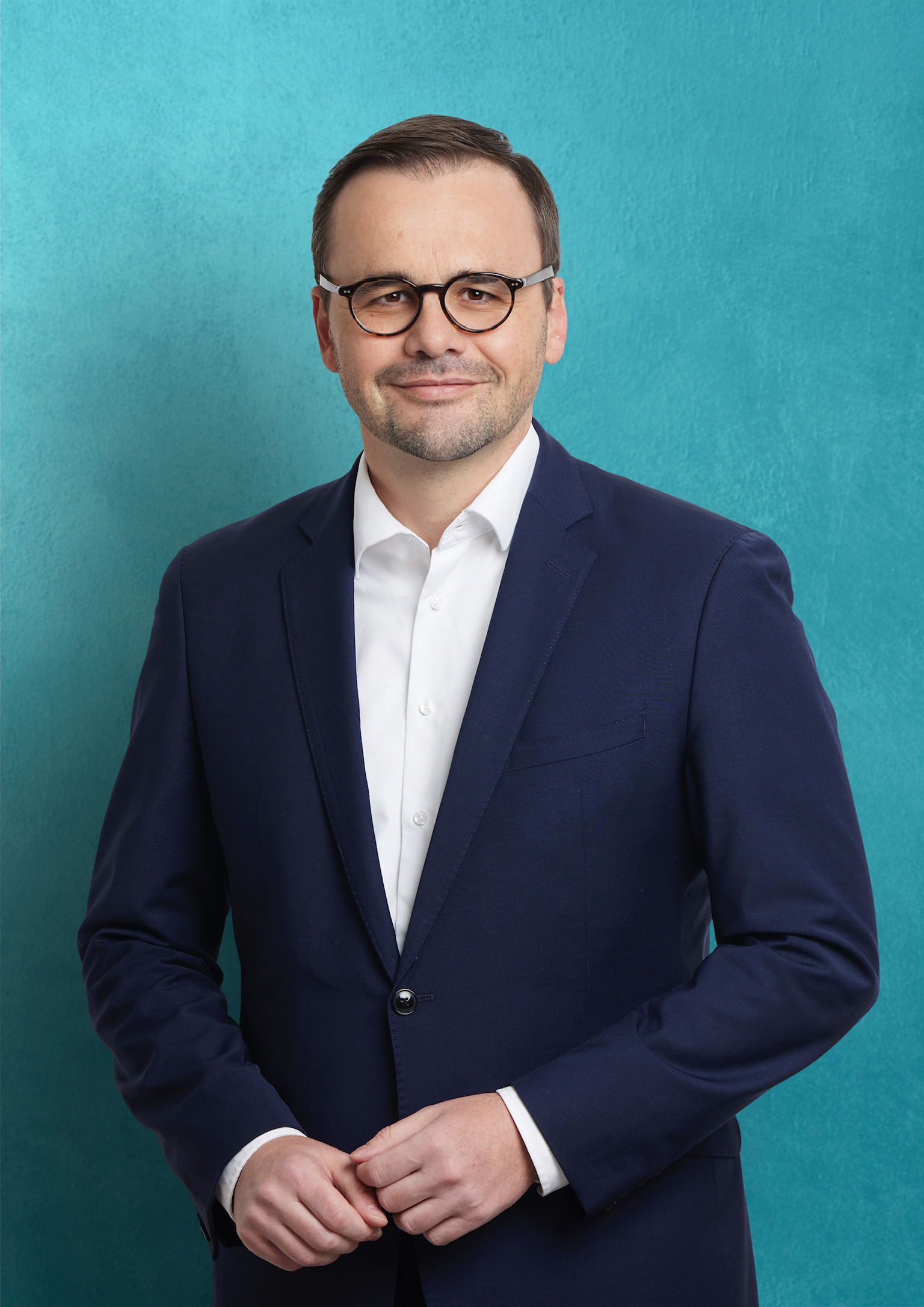
	First party	Second party
Leader	Dietmar Woidke	Hans-Christoph Berndt
Party	SPD	AfD
Last election	25 seats, 26.2%	23 seats, 23.5%
Seats won	32	30
Seat change	▲7	▲7
Popular vote	463,678	438,811
Percentage	30.9%	29.2%
Swing	▲4.7 pp	▲5.7 pp
	Third party	Fourth party
Leader	Robert Crumbach	Jan Redmann
Party	BSW	CDU
Last election	Did not exist	15 seats, 15.6%
Seats won	14	12
Seat change	▲14	▼3
Popular vote	202,343	181,632
Percentage	13.5%	12.1%
Swing	New party	▼3.5 pp
- Winning candidates in the single-member constituencies.
Government before election
Third Woidke cabinet
SPD–CDU–Green
Government after election
Fourth Woidke cabinet
SPD–BSW

The election to the state parliament Landtag of Brandenburg was held on 22 September 2024. The outgoing Third Woidke cabinet was a black-red-green "flag of Kenya" coalition consisting of the Social Democratic Party (SPD), the Christian Democratic Union (CDU) and The Greens, led by Minister-President Dietmar Woidke of the SPD. Despite losses of his partners, he could form a Fourth Woidke cabinet supported by the new Sahra Wagenknecht Alliance (BSW).

Brandenburg was the third state election within former East Germany in September 2024, three weeks after the state elections in Thuringia and in Saxony in which the Alternative for Germany (AfD) had performed well, coming in a close second in Saxony and taking a clear lead in Thuringia under Björn Höcke.

As the AfD is subject to a Firewall policy against the far-right in Germany, and was leading in the Brandenburg polls by 10%, the election became a two-horse race, either for AfD or against AfD, with several parties even losing representation at all. Despite polling showing them consistently trailing in second place, the SPD, which has governed Brandenburg since its 1990 re-establishment, received support from others and remained the largest party with a five percentage point swing in its favour. The AfD received a swing of six points and won just over 29% of the vote, but was denied to be strongest party.

Recently split off from Die Linke, thus with known candidates and with effective structures in the state, the Sahra Wagenknecht Alliance (BSW) debuted at 13.5%, followed by the CDU which declined to 12%. The outgoing government narrowly lost its majority as the Greens collapsed and fell short of the 5% electoral threshold, losing all their seats. Following the BSW walkout, The Left also suffered major losses and fell out of the Landtag, as did the Brandenburg Free Voters. The FDP, which had won 9.3% of the vote in the 2021 German federal election in Brandenburg and was part of a three party coalition that ruled Germany until November 2024, fell to 0.8% of the vote, their worst result in any state election ever, eclipsing the 0.9% of the vote in Saxony two weeks prior, and foreshadowing its collapse on national level.

== Background ==
The 2019 Brandenburg state election had resulted in the formation of the third Woidke cabinet, a "Kenya" coalition of the SPD, CDU, and Greens. The SPD remained the strongest party with small losses, just ahead of the AfD, which became the second largest party on a large swing. The CDU and The Left each recorded significant losses. The Greens achieved their best result to date with almost 11%. BVB/Free Voters improved to 5.0%. The FDP remained below the electoral threshold with 4.1% and did not win seats.

The SPD has governed Brandenburg continuously since the first post-reunification election in 1990. In the 2021 German federal election, the party won all 10 federal constituencies across the state.

The Brandenburg election was the third in a string of elections in Eastern Germany in September 2024, each of which saw a strong performance for the far-right AfD. In Thuringia the party became the largest in a state parliament for the first time; it also recorded its best result to date in Saxony. The parties involved in the federal Scholz government also suffered losses in each. The performance of Woidke's SPD in Brandenburg was considered a key test of Chancellor Olaf Scholz's leadership. The Brandenburg SPD campaigned on Woidke's personal popularity; Woidke pledged to resign if the SPD did not remain the largest party, encouraging tactical voting to deny AfD first place. He also received an unusual endorsement from the Minister-President of Saxony, Michael Kretschmer of CDU, who stated "the strongest party needs to be a democratic party".

== Parties and lists ==
Party	2019 result	Con. candidates	List candidates	Lead candidate
Social Democratic Party (SPD)	26.2%	44	87	Dietmar Woidke
Alternative for Germany (AfD)	23.5%	43	35	Hans-Christoph Berndt
Christian Democratic Union (CDU)	15.6%	44	45	Jan Redmann
Alliance 90/The Greens (GRÜNE)	10.8%	44	30	Antje Töpfer
The Left (LINKE)	10.7%	43	35	Sebastian Walter
Brandenburg Civic Movement/Free Voters (BVB/FW)	5.0%	44	39	Péter Vida
Free Democratic Party (FDP)	4.1%	44	17	Zyon Braun
Human Environment Animal Protection (Tierschutz)	2.6%	4	13	Christiane Müller-Schmolt
Plus Brandenburg (PLUS)	1.3%	12	17	Thomas Bennühr
BSW Brandenburg (BSW)	–	–	30	Robert Crumbach
Third Way (III. Weg)	–	5	7	Matthias Fischer
German Communist Party (DKP)	–	4	4	Fabian Große
German Rural Economy (DLW)	–	6	10	Benjamin Meise
Values Union (WU)	–	–	13	Anna-Sophia Werz
Other	–	11	–	

== Opinion polls ==
=== Graphical summary ===
Local regression of polls conducted before the 2024 Brandenburg state election

=== Party polling ===
Polling firm	Fieldwork date	Sample size	SPD	AfD	CDU	Grüne	Linke	BVB/FW	FDP	BSW	Others	Lead
2024 state election	22 Sep 2024	–	30.9	29.2	12.1	4.1	3.0	2.6	0.8	13.5	4.1	1.7
Wahlkreisprognose	17–21 Sep 2024	940	28	27	13.5	4	3.5	4.5	0.5	12.5	6.5	1
Forschungsgruppe Wahlen	18–19 Sep 2024	1,118	27	28	14	4.5	4	3.5	–	13	6	1
Wahlkreisprognose	11–18 Sep 2024	982	26.5	28.5	15	4	3.5	4.5	1	12	5	2
INSA	9–16 Sep 2024	1,000	25	28	16	4	3	4	2	14	4	3
Forschungsgruppe Wahlen	10–12 Sep 2024	1,060	26	29	15	5	3	3	–	14	5	3
Infratest dimap	9–11 Sep 2024	1,513	26	27	16	4.5	4	4.5	–	13	5	1
Wahlkreisprognose	28 Aug – 5 Sep 2024	1,420	20.5	30	15	5.5	3.5	4.5	1	14.5	5.5	9.5
Infratest dimap	3–4 Sep 2024	1,207	23	27	18	5	4	3	–	15	5	4
INSA	29 Jul–6 Aug 2024	1,000	20	24	19	5	5	4	2	17	4	4
INSA	8–15 Jul 2024	1,000	19	24	18	7	5	4	3	17	3	5
Infratest dimap	4–9 Jul 2024	1,153	19	23	19	7	4	3	3	16	6	4
Wahlkreisprognose	15–23 Jun 2024	1,000	16	29	16.5	5	3.5	5.5	1.5	17	6	12.5
European Parliament election	9 Jun 2024	–	13.1	27.5	18.4	6.0	4.4	–	3.2	13.8	13.6	9.1
INSA	13–21 May 2024	1,000	19	25	19	7	6	5	3	13	3	6
Infratest dimap	4–8 Apr 2024	1,161	22	26	18	8	6	3	–	10	7	4
Wahlkreisprognose	28 Mar – 7 Apr 2024	1,100	21	27	15	7	5.5	5.5	2	9.5	7.5	6
INSA	14–22 Mar 2024	1,000	19	25	19	8	7	4	3	12	3	6
INSA	8–15 Jan 2024	1,000	17	28	18	8	6	4	3	13	3 (Note: Plus Brandenburg 1%)	10
Forsa	6–10 Jan 2024	1,007	22	32	16	7	6	5	3	4	5	10
INSA	13–22 Nov 2023	1,000	20	27	18	8	6	3	3	11	4	7
Wahlkreisprognose	24 Oct–1 Nov 2023	1,017	27	32	13.5	6.5	7	6	2.5	–	5.5	5
Wahlkreisprognose	24 Oct–1 Nov 2023	1,017	21.5	22	12	4.5	5	4	2.5	21.5	7	0.5
Infratest dimap	8–11 Sep 2023	1,160	20	32	18	8	8	6	4	–	4	12
Wahlkreisprognose	10–14 Aug 2023	1,003	25	30	15	7	8	7	2	–	6	5
Wahlkreisprognose	10–14 Aug 2023	1,003	22	22	13	6.5	5.5	5	2	19.5	4.5	Tie
INSA	26 Jun–3 Jul 2023	1,000	21	28	18	9	10	5	3	–	6	7
IFM	22 May–1 Jun 2023	1,000	24	24	17	10	12	8	4	–	2	Tie
Infratest dimap	19–24 Apr 2023	1,200	22	23	23	9	7	5	5	–	6	Tie
INSA	27 Mar–4 Apr 2023	1,000	21	25	19	10	10	5	4	–	6	4
Wahlkreisprognose	7–13 Mar 2023	978	23.5	26	17	9	8	6.5	3	–	7	2.5
pmg – policy matters	28 Nov–15 Dec 2022	1,011	27	23	17	7	9	5	6	–	6	4
Wahlkreisprognose	6–18 Nov 2022	1,922	26	26	13.5	10	8	7	3.5	–	6	Tie
INSA	4–10 Oct 2022	1,000	22	25	17	11	10	5	4	–	6	3
Infratest dimap	22–26 Sep 2022	1,165	24	24	18	11	9	4	4	–	6	Tie
Wahlkreisprognose	4–11 Sep 2022	1,100	26.5	25	12	12	6	7	5	–	6.5	1.5
Wahlkreisprognose	9–17 May 2022	1,001	30	19	16	13	6	6	4.5	–	5.5	11
Infratest dimap	21–24 Apr 2022	1,182	30	19	18	10	7	4	6	–	3	11
Wahlkreisprognose	21–29 Mar 2022	1,002	29	20	15	11	6	8	5	–	6	9
Forsa	9–17 Dec 2021	1,008	28	17	14	11	11	8	6	–	5	11
Wahlkreisprognose	8–16 Dec 2021	1,040	34	19	10	9	7	8	7	–	6	15
Wahlkreisprognose	7–14 Oct 2021	980	32	19.5	9	9.5	7	9.5	7	–	6.5	12.5
2021 federal election	26 Sep 2021	–	29.5	18.1	15.3	9.0	8.5	–	9.3	–	10.3	11.4
Infratest dimap	25–30 Aug 2021	1,157	34	17	13	8	9	7	7	–	5	17
Infratest dimap	12–15 May 2021	1,183	23	18	16	16	11	4	7	–	5	5
Wahlkreisprognose	7–13 May 2021	–	22	18	14	19	9	8	5	–	5	3
Wahlkreisprognose	12–19 Mar 2021	–	24	18	14	14	10.5	9	5	–	5.5	6
Forsa	10–15 Dec 2020	1,001	23	16	20	15	12	6	4	–	4	7
Infratest dimap	12–17 Nov 2020	1,002	26	19	20	12	11	3	5	–	4	7
Wahlkreisprognose	30 Sep–7 Oct 2020	1,089	23	19	17	13.5	12.5	7.5	2	–	5.5	4
INSA	29 Sep–6 Oct 2020	1,043	21	20	17	16	13	5	4	–	4	1
Wahlkreisprognose	19–27 Aug 2020	–	26	16.5	19	11	12	7	3	–	5.5	7
Wahlkreisprognose	12–19 Jun 2020	–	28	16	22	10	10	7	3	–	4	6
Wahlkreisprognose	4–11 May 2020	–	29.5	20	23	7.5	7.5	4	4	–	4.5	6.5
Wahlkreisprognose	3–8 Apr 2020	–	28	21	20.5	8	8	6	3	–	5.5	7
Infratest dimap	31 Mar–4 Apr 2020	1,000	27	20	19	12	11	3	4	–	4	7
Forsa	20–25 Feb 2020	1,001	22	18	14	15	15	7	3	–	6	4
Infratest dimap	11–16 Nov 2019	1,000	25	22	14	12	12	5	5	–	5	1
2019 state election	1 Sep 2019	–	26.2	23.5	15.6	10.8	10.7	5.0	4.1	–	4.1	2.7

== Results ==
SPD's and AfD's swing by district

The SPD secured a victory, increasing both its popular vote percentage and the amount of seats held. Nonetheless, the two largest populist parties – the left-wing BSW and the far-right AfD – earned significant results, combining for precisely half of all the seats in the legislature. The Greens, the Left and the BVB/Free Voters faced a complete defeat, losing all of their seats. Finally, the FDP fell to less than 1% of the vote.

Overall, the outgoing coalition between the SPD, the CDU and the Greens earned 47.1% of the vote in a decline compared to their combined total of 52.6% of the vote in the 2019 election.

Party	Party-list				Constituency				Total seats	+/–
Party	Votes	%	+/–	Seats	Votes	%	+/–	Seats	Total seats	+/–
Social Democratic Party	463,678	30.89	▲4.70	13	500,923	33.57	▲7.75	19	32	▲7
Alternative for Germany	438,811	29.23	▲5.72	5	470,412	31.52	▲9.37	25	30	▲7
Sahra Wagenknecht Alliance	202,343	13.48	New	14					14	New
Christian Democratic Union	181,632	12.10	▼3.47	12	238,247	15.97	▼1.49	0	12	▼3
Alliance 90/The Greens	62,031	4.13	▼6.65	0	51,373	3.44	▼6.86	0	0	▼10
The Left	44,692	2.98	▼7.74	0	77,123	5.17	▼7.01	0	0	▼10
BVB/Free Voters	38,596	2.57	▼2.48	0	104,722	7.02	▼0.19	0	0	▼5
Animal Protection Party	30,032	2.00	▼0.60	0	3,758	0.25	▲0.25	0	0	–
Plus Brandenburg	13,577	0.90	▼0.36	0	8,900	0.60	▲0.48	0	0	–
Free Democratic Party	12,462	0.83	▼3.25	0	20,389	1.37	▼2.28	0	0	–
German Rural Economy	6,619	0.44	New	0	4,536	0.30	New	0	0	–
Values Union	3,877	0.26	New	0					0	–
Third Way	1,810	0.12	New	0	756	0.05	New	0	0	–
German Communist Party	1,028	0.07	New	0	743	0.05	▲0.01	0	0	–
Grassroots Democratic Party					394	0.03	New	0	0	–
Democrats BB					800	0.05	New	0	0	–
Die PARTEI					222	0.01	▼0.51	–	0	–
Other					8,939	0.60		–	0	–
Total	1,501,188	100.00	–	44	1,492,237	100.00	–	44	88	–
Valid votes	1,501,188	99.18			1,492,237	98.59				
Invalid/blank votes	12,450	0.82			21,401	1.41				
Total votes	1,513,638	100.00			1,513,638	100.00				
Registered voters/turnout	2,076,953	72.88	▲11.55		2,076,953	72.88				
Source: Wahlen Brandenburg

SPD vote

AfD vote

BSW vote

CDU vote

Green vote

Linke vote

BVB-FW vote

Turnout

=== Members ===
Constituency		Member	Party	Votes (%)
001	Prignitz I	Adam, Jean-René	AfD	34.5
002	Prignitz II/Ostprignitz-Ruppin II	Arndt, Torsten	AfD	36.2
003	Ostprignitz-Ruppin I	Liedtke, Ulrike	SPD	34.6
004	Ostprignitz-Ruppin III/Havelland II	Berger, Kai	AfD	35.0
005	Havelland I	Funke, Johannes	SPD	36.1
006	Havelland II	Sahi, Julia	SPD	37.1
007	Oberhavel I	Noack, Andreas	SPD	34.0
008	Oberhavel II	Grimm, Benjamin	SPD	37.0
009	Oberhavel III	Zimmermann, Tim	AfD	33.4
010	Uckermark III/Oberhavel IV	Galau, Andreas	AfD	35.8
011	Uckermark I	Teichner, Felix	AfD	39.8
012	Uckermark II	Rescher, Norbert	AfD	39.7
013	Barnim I	Kuffert, Roman	AfD	32.8
014	Barnim II	John, Steffen	AfD	26.3
015	Barnim III	Kotré, Lena	AfD	34.9
016	Brandenburg an der Havel I/Potsdam-Mittelmark I	Wernitz, Udo	SPD	32.1
017	Brandenburg an der Havel II	Kornmesser, Britta	SPD	39.2
018	Potsdam-Mittelmark II	Balzer, Melanie	SPD	38.3
019	Potsdam-Mittelmark III/Potsdam III	Adler, Uwe	SPD	39.8
020	Potsdam-Mittelmark IV	Rüter, Sebastien	SPD	40.0
021	Potsdam I	Schüle, Majna	SPD	34.4
022	Potsdam II	Keller, Daniel	SPD	42.8
023	Teltow-Fläming I	Penquitt, Marcel	SPD	36.8
024	Teltow-Fläming II	Stohn, Erik	SPD	38.8
025	Teltow-Fläming III	Seiler, Ines	SPD	32.5
026	Dahme-Spreewald I	Fischer, Tina	SPD	36.5
027	Dahme-Spreewald II/Oder-Spree I	Scheetz, Ludwig	SPD	35.7
028	Dahme-Spreewald III	Berndt, Hans-Christoph	AfD	39.3
029	Oder-Spree II	Hohloch, Dennis	AfD	40.5
030	Oder-Spree III	Muxel, Kathleen	AfD	36.9
031	Märkisch-Oderland I/Oder-Spree IV	Vogelsänger, Jörg	SPD	32.7
032	Märkisch-Oderland II	Pardeik, Erik	AfD	33.5
033	Märkisch-Oderland III	Günther, Lars	AfD	38.0
034	Märkisch-Oderland IV	Janke, Falk Gerd	AfD	38.8
035	Frankfurt (Oder)	Möller, Wilko	AfD	33.6
036	Elbe-Elster I	Drenske, Peter	AfD	36.3
037	Elbe-Elster II	Nothing, Volker	AfD	43.5
038	Oberspreewald-Lausitz I	Bessin, Birgit	AfD	44.3
039	Oberspreewald-Lausitz II/Spree-Neiße IV	Jank, Fabian	AfD	38.7
040	Oberspreewald-Lausitz III/Spree-Neiße III	Münschke, Daniel	AfD	36.8
041	Spree-Neiße I	Kubitzki, Steffen	AfD	41.5
042	Spree-Neiße II	Hanko, Michael	AfD	46.5
043	Cottbus I	Hohm, Jean-Pascal	AfD	34.6
044	Cottbus II	Katzmarek, Lars	SPD	38.0
List		Freiherr von Lützow, Daniel	AfD	
List		Kaufner, Dominik	AfD	
List		Hünich, Lars	AfD	
List		Filter, Benjamin	AfD	
List		Oeynhausen, Daniela Rita	AfD	
List		Crumbach, Robert	BSW	
List		Gruhn, Jouleen	BSW	
List		Roth, Stefan	BSW	
List		Lüders, Niels-Olaf	BSW	
List		von Ossowski, André	BSW	
List		Matzies-Köhler, Melanie	BSW	
List		Peschel, Falk	BSW	
List		Hornauf, Sven	BSW	
List		Meyer, Jenny	BSW	
List		Kutsche, Andreas	BSW	
List		Reinhard, Simon	BSW	
List		Dorst, Christian	BSW	
List		Lehmann, Gunnar	BSW	
List		Skopec, Oliver	BSW	
List		Redmann, Jan	CDU	
List		Augustin, Kirsty	CDU	
List		Hoffmann, Gordon	CDU	
List		Genilke, Rainer	CDU	
List		Bretz, Steeven	CDU	
List		Ludwig, Saskia	CDU	
List		Bommert, Frank	CDU	
List		Schierack, Michael	CDU	
List		Walter-Mundt, Nicole	CDU	
List		Eichelbaum, Danny	CDU	
List		Brüning, Julian	CDU	
List		Fährmann, Ellen	CDU	
List		Woidke, Dietmar	SPD	
List		Lange, Katrin	SPD	
List		Lüttmann, Björn	SPD	
List		Poschmann, Katja	SPD	
List		Roick, Wolfgang	SPD	
List		Hildebrandt, Elske	SPD	
List		Mittelstädt, Hanka	SPD	
List		Wolff, Annemarie	SPD	
List		Fischer, Kurt	SPD	
List		Graßmel, Nadine	SPD	
List		Steinfurth, Matthias	SPD	
List		Schmidt, Martina Maxi	SPD	
List		Schönbrunn, Sina	SPD	

=== Electorate ===
Demographic	SPD	AfD	CDU	Grüne	Linke	BVB/FW	FDP	BSW	Other
Total vote	30.9%	29.2%	12.1%	4.1%	3.0%	2.6%	0.8%	13.5%	3.8%
Sex
Men	29%	35%	12%	4%	3%	2%	1%	12%	2%
Women	33%	24%	11%	5%	3%	3%	1%	16%	4%
Age
16–24 years old	19%	31%	9%	6%	7%	2%	2%	13%	11%
25–34 years old	20%	33%	11%	6%	5%	3%	1%	14%	7%
35–44 years old	24%	34%	12%	6%	3%	4%	1%	12%	4%
45–59 years old	29%	32%	13%	4%	2%	3%	1%	13%	3%
60–69 years old	35%	28%	12%	2%	2%	2%	1%	15%	3%
70 and older	49%	17%	12%	2%	3%	2%	0%	16%	-1%
Employment status
Self-employed	24%	34%	18%	6%	1%	2%	2%	11%	2%
Employees	31%	29%	11%	5%	4%	3%	1%	12%	4%
Workers	24%	46%	7%	2%	1%	3%	1%	12%	4%
Pensioners	40%	22%	12%	1%	2%	2%	1%	18%	2%
Education
Simple education	30%	37%	14%	1%	2%	1%	0%	12%	3%
Medium education	28%	36%	10%	2%	2%	3%	1%	14%	4%
High education	34%	21%	13%	7%	4%	3%	1%	13%	4%
Source: Infratest dimap

== Aftermath ==
Immediate reaction to the results focused on the successful use of tactical voting to deny AfD first place, and the SPD closing the large gap in pre-election polling as a result. The ARD exit poll found that 75 percent of SPD voters and 59 percent of CDU voters agreed with the statement "I was not convinced by the party, but I'm voting for it to prevent a strong AfD".

The AfD won the most constituencies (Direktmandat). This was the worst result for the CDU in any state election in the east. Lead candidate Jan Redmann was critical of what he called Woidke's "AfD or me" campaign tactics, arguing that it only served to depress the vote share of the other mainstream parties and did not dissuade anyone from voting for the AfD. As well, state party leaders criticized CDU Minister-President Michael Kretschmer of Saxony's endorsement of Woidke in the run-up to the election; general secretary Gordon Hoffmann called the endorsement "uncooperative" while Redmann stated it was "completely unhelpful" and disappointed CDU campaigners. The CDU campaign was also damaged by Redmann's arrest for drunk driving in Potsdam in mid-July. He was stopped driving an electric scooter with a blood alcohol content of 1.28 per mille (0.128%), well above the 0.5 legal limit and also past the limit of 1.1 where the offense becomes a crime with a potential prison sentence instead of only a fine. Despite questions about his fitness for office, he remained their lead candidate.

This was also the worst result for the FDP in any state, federal or European election in the party's history. Its total of 12,462 party-list votes, a share of 0.8%, barely eclipsed the 12,450 invalid party-list votes. FDP federal leader Christian Lindner blamed the poor result on the "tactical situation" and the unpopularity of the federal traffic light coalition, not on lead candidate Zyon Braun or any of the campaign.

The seat distribution was in doubt for part of election night, as Brandenburg has a version of the "basic mandate clause" (Grundmandatsklausel) where all parties winning at least one constituency seat are granted full proportional representation according to their share of party-list votes. Both Green MP Marie Schäffer and BVB-FW leader Péter Vida were competitive in their respective constituencies in Potsdam and Barnim, though neither ultimately won; their parties lost all of their seats as a result. The Left failed to pass the five-percent electoral threshold and also lost its seats, marking the first time the party is not represented in a state parliament in the former East Germany.

Dietmar Woidke lost his constituency seat Spree-Neiße I, which he had represented since 2009, to the AfD candidate Steffen Kubitzki by a margin of seven votes. As all leading candidates are also first on their party's list, Woidke instead fills one of SPD's thirteen list seats.

With more than one-third of seats, AfD has a "blocking minority" (Sperrminorität) that allows it to veto certain parliamentary actions requiring a two-thirds majority, even if it is not in government. In Brandenburg, this includes the selection of constitutional court judges and approval of state constitutional amendments.

On 25 September, the joint leaders of Alliance 90/The Greens, Omid Nouripour and Ricarda Lang, announced their resignations after poor results in the three eastern state elections. After the Greens entered all of them as part of the respective governing coalitions, it was wiped out in Brandenburg and Thuringia, while it received only 5.1% of the party-list vote in Saxony to narrowly retain representation.

=== Government formation ===
The incumbent "Kenya coalition" is no longer possible. With an SPD-CDU coalition one seat short of a majority, and all parties having ruled out working with AfD, the only two mathematically possible majority coalitions are that of SPD and BSW or SPD, BSW and CDU. SPD general secretary Kevin Kühnert confirmed the day after the election that coalition talks would take place with BSW.

In a press conference at SPD headquarters in Berlin later on 23 September, Woidke announced he was inviting both BSW and CDU to begin exploratory talks. BSW leader Robert Crumbach would not commit to participating in government and suggested the SPD-CDU minority government would be workable. CDU leaders, however, ruled out any participation in government in view of their party's poor results. Hoffmann reacted skeptically to the invitation: "To be honest, I don't know what there is to discuss in these talks...we have no mandate to govern."

Exploratory talks between SPD and BSW (Red–purple coalition) began on 1 October, with a second round occurring the following week. Woidke described good progress but emphasized that "exploratory talks are exploratory talks. The decision is made at the end." The SPD state executive committee scheduled a meeting at the end of the month to potentially consider a recommendation to move forward with negotiations. On 28 October, both parties presented an exploratory paper and reached an agreement on the issue of peace, clearing the way for coalition negotiations to begin.

Woidke and Crumbach announced their parties had reached a coalition agreement on 27 November. The coalition has a narrow majority of two seats; talks were threatened when one BSW MdL, Sven Hornauf, publicly stated he would not vote for Woidke in protest of the planned stationing of Arrow 3 missiles at the Holzdorf Air Base. However, Crumbach criticized Hornauf for his statement and was able to confirm the coalition would still have the votes for Woidke without him.

=== Minister-President election ===
The Minister-President election took place on 11 December. Any nominee requires an absolute majority on the first two ballots, and a plurality on the third ballot. One AfD member was absent, placing the absolute majority at 45 of 87 votes. Unexpectedly, Woidke lost two additional votes from his own coalition and failed to win a majority on the first ballot. The second ballot then had five apparent votes from the opposition for Woidke. CDU and AfD leaders each accused the other party of providing those votes, though no claims can be proven as the election is by secret ballot.

Minister-President election Dietmar Woidke (SPD)
Ballot →	First	Second
Required majority →	45 out of 87	45 out of 87
For	43 / 87	50 / 87
Against	40 / 87	36 / 87
Abstain/invalid	4 / 87	1 / 87

== See also ==
- Politics of Brandenburg
