= Spree-Neiße II =

State electoral district of Germany

42: Spree-Neiße II
- Electoral district for the Landtag of Brandenburg
- Spree-Neiße II in 2024
- District: Spree-Neiße
- Electorate: 34,092 (2024)
- Major settlements: Spremberg and Welzow

Current electoral district
- Created: 1994
- Party: AfD
- Member: Michael Hanko

Spree-Neiße II is an electoral constituency (German: Wahlkreis) represented in the Landtag of Brandenburg. It elects one member via first-past-the-post voting. Under the constituency numbering system, it is designated as constituency 42. It is located within the district of Spree-Neiße.

== Geography ==
The constituency includes the towns of Spremberg and Welzow, as well as the municipality of Neuhausen/Spree, and the district of Döbern-Land.

There were 34,092 eligible voters in 2024.

== Members ==
Election	Member	Party	%
2004	Birgit Wöllert	PDS	32.3
2009	Birgit Wöllert	Left	31.3
2014	Raik Nowka	CDU	29.0
2019	Michael Hanko	AfD	35.9
2024	Michael Hanko	AfD	46.5

== Election results ==
=== 2024 election ===
State election (2024): Spree-Neiße II
Notes:	Blue background denotes the winner of the electorate vote. Pink background denotes a candidate elected from their party list. Yellow background denotes an electorate win by a list member, or other incumbent. A ✓ or ✗ denotes status of any incumbent, win or lose respectively.						
Party	Candidate	Votes	%	±%	Party votes	%	±%
AfD	✓ Michael Hanko	11,712	46.5	▲10.6	10.563	41.7	▲5.7
SPD	Peter Wolf	6,648	26.4	▲3.9	6,690	26.4	▲0.9
BSW					3,491	13.8	
CDU	Julian Brüning	3,498	13.9	▼6.6	2,469	9.8	▼5.6
Left	Franke	1,350	5.4	▼3.6	499	2.0	▼5.9
BVB/FW	Piosik	1,167	4.6	▲1.0	435	1.7	▼1.6
FDP	Kellner	308	1.2	▼3.0	148	0.6	▼4.1
Tierschutzpartei					412	1.6	▼0.8
Greens	Franke	282	1.1	▼2.3	303	1.2	▼2.8
Independent	Hoffmann	229	0.9				
Values					95	0.4	
Plus					94	0.4	
DLW					73	0.3	
Third Way					41	0.2	
DKP					7	0.0	
Informal votes		338			212		
Total valid votes		25,194			25,320		
Turnout		25,532	74.9	▲8.8			
AfD hold	Majority	5,064	20.1	▲6.7			

=== 2019 election ===
State election (2019): Spree-Neiße II
Notes:	Blue background denotes the winner of the electorate vote. Pink background denotes a candidate elected from their party list. Yellow background denotes an electorate win by a list member, or other incumbent. A ✓ or ✗ denotes status of any incumbent, win or lose respectively.						
Party	Candidate	Votes	%	±%	Party votes	%	±%
AfD	Michael Hanko	8,360	35.9	▲24.3	8,409	36.0	▲22.8
SPD	Jörg Rakete	5,250	22.5	▼5.9	5,959	25.5	▼12.6
CDU	✗ Raik Nowka	4,769	20.5	▼8.5	3,576	15.3	▼8.6
Left	Birgit Kaufhold	2,097	9.0	▼7.7	1,850	7.9	▼6.0
FDP	Meike Holtsch	977	4.2	▲2.9	1,092	4.7	▲3.7
BVB/FW	Wolfgang Borchert	855	3.7	▼1.0	767	3.3	▲1.5
Greens	Karin Noack	805	3.5	▼1.2	927	4.0	▲0.6
Tierschutzpartei					556	2.4	
Independent	Roy Hoffmann	203	0.9				
Pirates					113	0.5	▼0.4
ÖDP					73	0.3	
V-Partei3					42	0.2	
Informal votes		358			310		
Total valid votes		23,316			23,364		
Turnout		23,674	66.1	▲14.2			
AfD gain from CDU	Majority	3,110	13.4				

=== 2014 election ===
State election (2014): Spree-Neiße II
Notes:	Blue background denotes the winner of the electorate vote. Pink background denotes a candidate elected from their party list. Yellow background denotes an electorate win by a list member, or other incumbent. A ✓ or ✗ denotes status of any incumbent, win or lose respectively.						
Party	Candidate	Votes	%	±%	Party votes	%	±%
CDU	Raik Nowka	5,616	29.0	▲6.1	4,644	23.9	▲2.6
SPD	Jörg Rakete	5,499	28.4	▲2.5	7,392	38.1	▲6.3
Left	Andreas Paul Mekelburg	3,238	16.7	▼14.6	2,694	13.9	▼13.0
AfD	Detlef Fabian	2,246	11.6		2,572	13.2	
BVB/FW	Eberhard Brünsch	916	4.7	▲0.6	350	1.8	▼0.5
Greens	Vera Hannelore Wodtke	915	4.7	▲0.5	653	3.4	▼0.1
NPD	Karsten Schulz	665	3.4	▼1.0	686	3.5	▼0.5
FDP	Meike Holtsch	249	1.3	▼6.0	186	1.0	▼5.9
Pirates					178	0.9	
REP					37	0.2	▼0.3
DKP					33	0.2	▲0.1
Informal votes		452			371		
Total valid votes		19,344			19,425		
Turnout		19,796	51.9	▼14.9			
CDU gain from Left	Majority	117	0.6				

=== 2009 election ===
State election (2009): Spree-Neiße II
Notes:	Blue background denotes the winner of the electorate vote. Pink background denotes a candidate elected from their party list. Yellow background denotes an electorate win by a list member, or other incumbent. A ✓ or ✗ denotes status of any incumbent, win or lose respectively.						
Party	Candidate	Votes	%	±%	Party votes	%	±%
Left	✓ Birgit Wöllert	8,183	31.3	▼1.0	7,074	26.9	▲0.3
SPD	Helmut Franz	6,765	25.9	▼0.6	8,365	31.8	▲3.3
CDU	Peter Drobig	5,966	22.9	▼5.9	5,604	21.3	▼0.6
FDP	Falk Müller	1,899	7.3	▲3.4	1,805	6.9	▲4.1
NPD	Karsten Schulz	1,145	4.4		1,051	4.0	
Greens	Stefan Lechner	1,084	4.2		919	3.5	▲1.8
BVB/FW	Eberhard Brünsch	1,073	4.1		616	2.3	
DVU					363	1.4	▼8.1
50Plus					156	0.6	▼0.5
RRP					127	0.5	
REP					125	0.5	
Die-Volksinitiative					61	0.2	
DKP					25	0.1	▼0.1
Informal votes		998			802		
Total valid votes		26,095			26,291		
Turnout		27,093	66.8	▲8.0			
Left hold	Majority	1,398	5.4	▼0.4			

=== 2004 election ===
State election (2004): Spree-Neiße II
Notes:	Blue background denotes the winner of the electorate vote. Pink background denotes a candidate elected from their party list. Yellow background denotes an electorate win by a list member, or other incumbent. A ✓ or ✗ denotes status of any incumbent, win or lose respectively.						
Party	Candidate	Votes	%	±%	Party votes	%	±%
PDS	Birgit Wöllert	7,783	32.25		6,484	26.59	
CDU	Andreas Kottwitz	6,941	28.76		5,332	21.86	
SPD	Dietmar Woidke	6,392	26.49		6,963	28.55	
DVU					2,323	9.52	
AfW (Free Voters)	Wilfried Koinzer	1,278	5.30		323	1.32	
FDP	Petra Wiegel-Siebert	945	3.92		692	2.84	
Familie					690	2.83	
AUB-Brandenburg					306	1.25	
50Plus					271	1.11	
Schill	Gerd Michel	794	3.29		175	0.72	
Gray Panthers					174	0.71	
Yes Brandenburg					109	0.45	
BRB					82	0.34	
DKP					40	0.16	
Informal votes		900			644		
Total valid votes		24,133			24,389		
Turnout		25,033	58.83				
PDS win new seat	Majority	842	3.49				

== See also ==
- Politics of Brandenburg
- Landtag of Brandenburg
