= Potsdam-Mittelmark III/Potsdam III =

State electoral district of Germany

19: Potsdam-Mittelmark III/Potsdam III
- Electoral district for the Landtag of Brandenburg
- Potsdam-Mittelmark III/Potsdam III in 2024
- District: Potsdam-Mittelmark and Potsdam
- Electorate: 53,960 (2024)
- Major settlements: Potsdam (partial), and Werder

Current electoral district
- Created: 1994
- Party: SPD
- Member: Uwe Adler

Potsdam-Mittelmark III/Potsdam III is an electoral constituency (German: Wahlkreis) represented in the Landtag of Brandenburg. It elects one member via first-past-the-post voting. Under the constituency numbering system, it is designated as constituency 19. It is split between the district of Potsdam-Mittelmark and the state capital of Potsdam.

== Geography ==
The constituency includes the town of Werder and the municipality of Schwielowsee within Potsdam-Mittelmark, and the districts of Bornim, Bornstedt, Eiche, Fahrland, Golm, Groß Glienicke, Grube, Marquardt, Nedlitz, Neu Fahrland, Sacrow, Satzkorn, and Uetz-Paaren within the city of Potsdam.

There were 53,960 eligible voters in 2024.

== Members ==
| Election | Member | Party | % |
|---|---|---|---|
| 2004 | Saskia Funck | CDU | 28.1 |
| 2009 | Saskia Funck | CDU | 29.7 |
| 2014 | Saskia Funck | CDU | 31.7 |
| 2019 | Uwe Adler | SPD | 25.3 |
| 2024 | Uwe Adler | SPD | 39.8 |

== Election results ==
=== 2024 election ===
State election (2024): Potsdam-Mittelmark III / Potsdam III
| Notes: | Blue background denotes the winner of the electorate vote. Pink background denotes a candidate elected from their party list. Yellow background denotes an electorate win by a list member, or other incumbent. A ✓ or ✗ denotes status of any incumbent, win or lose respectively. | | | | | | |
| Party | Candidate | Votes | % | ±% | Party votes | % | ±% |
|---|---|---|---|---|---|---|---|
| SPD | ✓ Uwe Adler | 17,025 | 39.8 | ▲13.8 | 14,789 | 34.4 | ▲9.4 |
| AfD | Deter | 8,758 | 20.5 | ▲5.2 | 8,151 | 18.9 | ▲2.7 |
| CDU | Dr. Saskia Ludwig | 7,594 | 17.7 | ▼2.6 | 6,209 | 14.4 | ▼2.9 |
| BSW | | | | | 4,858 | 11.3 | |
| Greens | Dr. Freudl | 3,339 | 7.8 | ▼9.2 | 4,183 | 9.7 | ▼8.9 |
| Left | Schindler | 2,104 | 4.9 | ▼6.9 | 1,628 | 3.8 | ▼6.3 |
| Tierschutzpartei | | | | | 837 | 1.9 | ▼0.4 |
| BVB/FW | Mendling | 1,740 | 4.1 | ▼1.1 | 815 | 1.9 | ▼1.7 |
| Plus | Bachmann | 977 | 2.3 | | 722 | 1.7 | ▲0.1 |
| FDP | Braun | 929 | 2.2 | ▼1.5 | 560 | 1.3 | ▼3.7 |
| Independent | Müller | 352 | 0.8 | ▲0.1 | | | |
| Values | | | | | 149 | 0.3 | |
| DLW | | | | | 82 | 0.2 | |
| DKP | | | | | 25 | 0.1 | |
| Third Way | | | | | 21 | 0.0 | |
| Informal votes | | 438 | | | 227 | | |
| Total valid votes | | 42,818 | | | 42,029 | | |
| Turnout | | 43,256 | 80.2 | ▲10.2 | | | |
| SPD hold | Majority | 8,783 | 19.3 | | | | |

=== 2019 election ===
State election (2019): Potsdam-Mittelmark III/Potsdam III
| Notes: | Blue background denotes the winner of the electorate vote. Pink background denotes a candidate elected from their party list. Yellow background denotes an electorate win by a list member, or other incumbent. A ✓ or ✗ denotes status of any incumbent, win or lose respectively. | | | | | | |
| Party | Candidate | Votes | % | ±% | Party votes | % | ±% |
|---|---|---|---|---|---|---|---|
| SPD | Uwe Adler | 10,776 | 25.3 | ▼4.1 | 10,653 | 24.9 | ▼3.3 |
| CDU | ✗ Dr. Saskia Ludwig | 8,441 | 19.8 | ▼11.9 | 7,270 | 17.0 | ▼9.5 |
| Greens | Robert Funke | 7,183 | 16.8 | ▲8.0 | 7,868 | 18.4 | ▲7.2 |
| AfD | Marlon Deter | 6,489 | 15.2 | ▲6.1 | 6,937 | 16.2 | ▲5.4 |
| Left | Tina Lange | 4,940 | 11.6 | ▼5.0 | 4,323 | 10.1 | ▼7.0 |
| BVB/FW | Roland Büchner | 1,546 | 3.6 | ▲2.2 | 2,183 | 5.1 | ▲3.3 |
| FDP | Kay Martin | 1,546 | 3.6 | ▲2.2 | 2,183 | 5.1 | ▲3.3 |
| Tierschutzpartei | | | | | 990 | 2.3 | |
| ÖDP | | | | | 336 | 0.8 | |
| Independent | Edmund Müller | 292 | 0.7 | ▼0.5 | | | |
| Pirates | | | | | 290 | 0.7 | ▼1.0 |
| V-Partei3 | | | | | 134 | 0.3 | |
| Informal votes | | 411 | | | 328 | | |
| Total valid votes | | 42,651 | | | 42,734 | | |
| Turnout | | 43,062 | 70.2 | ▲13.1 | | | |
| SPD gain from CDU | Majority | 2,335 | 5.5 | | | | |

=== 2014 election ===
State election (2014): Potsdam-Mittelmark III/Potsdam III
| Notes: | Blue background denotes the winner of the electorate vote. Pink background denotes a candidate elected from their party list. Yellow background denotes an electorate win by a list member, or other incumbent. A ✓ or ✗ denotes status of any incumbent, win or lose respectively. | | | | | | |
| Party | Candidate | Votes | % | ±% | Party votes | % | ±% |
|---|---|---|---|---|---|---|---|
| CDU | ✓ Dr. Saskia Ludwig | 9,663 | 31.7 | ▲4.4 | 8,109 | 26.5 | ▲5.1 |
| SPD | Mike Schubert | 8,984 | 29.4 | ▲0.8 | 8,608 | 28.2 | ▼5.0 |
| Left | Sascha Krämer | 5,057 | 16.6 | ▼8.8 | 5,219 | 17.1 | ▼6.3 |
| AfD | Steffen Königer | 2,781 | 9.1 | | 3,310 | 10.8 | |
| Greens | Nils Naber | 2,682 | 8.8 | ▲0.8 | 3,409 | 11.2 | ▲2.5 |
| Pirates | Sascha Curth | 542 | 1.8 | | 518 | 1.7 | |
| FDP | Marion Vogdt | 436 | 1.4 | ▼5.6 | 555 | 1.8 | ▼6.7 |
| BVB/FW | | | | | 494 | 1.6 | ▲0.3 |
| Independent | Edmund Müller | 368 | 1.2 | | | | |
| NPD | | | | | 228 | 0.7 | ▼0.7 |
| DKP | | | | | 69 | 0.2 | Steady |
| REP | | | | | 28 | 0.1 | ▼0.1 |
| Informal votes | | 492 | | | 458 | | |
| Total valid votes | | 30,513 | | | 30,547 | | |
| Turnout | | 31,005 | 57.1 | ▼14.5 | | | |
| CDU hold | Majority | 679 | 2.3 | | | | |

=== 2009 election ===
State election (2009): Potsdam Mittelmark III/Potsdam III
| Notes: | Blue background denotes the winner of the electorate vote. Pink background denotes a candidate elected from their party list. Yellow background denotes an electorate win by a list member, or other incumbent. A ✓ or ✗ denotes status of any incumbent, win or lose respectively. | | | | | | |
| Party | Candidate | Votes | % | ±% | Party votes | % | ±% |
|---|---|---|---|---|---|---|---|
| CDU | ✓ Saskia Funck | 9,648 | 29.7 | ▲1.6 | 7,310 | 22.5 | ▼0.2 |
| SPD | Susanne Melior | 9,214 | 28.4 | ▲0.6 | 10,660 | 32.8 | Steady |
| Left | Andreas Bernig | 7,719 | 23.8 | ▼1.7 | 7,389 | 22.7 | ▼0.6 |
| Greens | Yvonne Plaul | 2,308 | 7.1 | ▲0.9 | 2,574 | 7.9 | ▲1.9 |
| FDP | Marion Vogdt | 2,004 | 6.2 | ▼0.1 | 2,859 | 8.8 | ▲5.0 |
| NPD | Petra Reichel | 615 | 1.0 | | 513 | 1.6 | |
| BVB/FW | Alexander Wunderling | 480 | 1.5 | | 450 | 1.4 | |
| RRP | Wolfgang Kroll | 350 | 1.1 | | 255 | 0.8 | |
| DVU | | | | | 249 | 0.8 | ▼3.8 |
| 50Plus | | | | | 124 | 0.4 | ▼0.1 |
| Independent | Dirk Stumpf | 96 | 0.3 | | | | |
| REP | | | | | 57 | 0.2 | |
| Die-Volksinitiative | | | | | 54 | 0.2 | |
| DKP | | | | | 54 | 0.2 | ▲0.1 |
| Informal votes | | 787 | | | 673 | | |
| Total valid votes | | 32,434 | | | 32,548 | | |
| Turnout | | 33,221 | 71.6 | ▲10.1 | | | |
| CDU hold | Majority | 434 | 1.3 | ▲1.0 | | | |

=== 2004 election ===
State election (2004): Potsdam-Mittelmark III/Potsdam III
| Notes: | Blue background denotes the winner of the electorate vote. Pink background denotes a candidate elected from their party list. Yellow background denotes an electorate win by a list member, or other incumbent. A ✓ or ✗ denotes status of any incumbent, win or lose respectively. | | | | | | |
| Party | Candidate | Votes | % | ±% | Party votes | % | ±% |
|---|---|---|---|---|---|---|---|
| CDU | Saskia Funck | 7,228 | 28.08 | | 5,900 | 22.74 | |
| SPD | Susanne Melior | 7,158 | 27.81 | | 8,511 | 32.81 | |
| PDS | Andreas Bernig | 6,564 | 25.50 | | 6,043 | 23.30 | |
| FDP | Heiko Hüller | 1,626 | 6.32 | | 984 | 3.79 | |
| Greens | Joachim Gessinger | 1,604 | 6.23 | | 1,544 | 5.95 | |
| DVU | | | | | 1,188 | 4.58 | |
| Familie | | | | | 895 | 3.45 | |
| AfW (Free Voters) | Wolfgang Kroll | 1,562 | 6.07 | | 299 | 1.15 | |
| Gray Panthers | | | | | 225 | 0.87 | |
| 50Plus | | | | | 132 | 0.51 | |
| BRB | | | | | 69 | 0.27 | |
| AUB-Brandenburg | | | | | 63 | 0.24 | |
| Yes Brandenburg | | | | | 50 | 0.19 | |
| DKP | | | | | 28 | 0.11 | |
| Schill | | | | | 10 | 0.04 | |
| Informal votes | | 641 | | | 442 | | |
| Total valid votes | | 25,742 | | | 25,941 | | |
| Turnout | | 26,383 | 61.47 | | | | |
| CDU win new seat | Majority | 70 | 0.27 | | | | |

== See also ==
- Politics of Brandenburg
- Landtag of Brandenburg
