= Brandenburg an der Havel II =

State electoral district of Germany

17: Brandenburg an der Havel II
- Electoral district for the Landtag of Brandenburg
- Brandenburg an der Havel II in 2024
- District: Brandenburg an der Havel
- Electorate: 48,979 (2024)
- Major settlements: Most of Brandenburg an der Havel

Current electoral district
- Created: 1994
- Party: SPD
- Member: Brita Kornmesser

Brandenburg an der Havel II is an electoral constituency (German: Wahlkreis) represented in the Landtag of Brandenburg. It elects one member via first-past-the-post voting. Under the constituency numbering system, it is designated as constituency 17. It is located in the city of Brandenburg an der Havel.

== Geography ==
The constituency includes the districts of Alstadt, Dom, Gollwitz, Hohenstücken, Kirchmöser, Neustadt, Nort, and Wust – comprising the majority of Brandenburg an der Havel.

There were 48,979 eligible voters in 2024.

== Members ==
Election	Member	Party	%
2004	Ralf Holzschuher	SPD	30.7
2009	Ralf Holzschuher	SPD	34.2
2014	Ralf Holzschuher	SPD	38.9
2019	Brita Kornmesser	SPD	25.5
2024	Brita Kornmesser	SPD	39.2

== Election results ==
=== 2024 election ===
State election (2024): Brandenburg an der Havel II
Notes:	Blue background denotes the winner of the electorate vote. Pink background denotes a candidate elected from their party list. Yellow background denotes an electorate win by a list member, or other incumbent. A ✓ or ✗ denotes status of any incumbent, win or lose respectively.						
Party	Candidate	Votes	%	±%	Party votes	%	±%
SPD	✓ Brita Kornmesser	12,398	39.2	▲13.8	10,501	33.0	▲7.5
AfD	Brösicke	9,189	29.1	▲8.5	8,197	25.7	▲4.7
BSW					4,529	14.2	
CDU	Lause	4,379	13.9	▼4.6	3,500	11.0	▼6.4
BVB/FW	Stieger	2,142	6.8	▼1.8	932	2.9	▼2.9
Left	Willnat	1,445	4.6	▼8.2	1,026	3.2	▼7.0
Tierschutzpartei					728	2.3	▼0.3
Plus	Zumbusch	853	2.7		478	1.5	▲0.2
Greens	Westphal	793	2.5	▼8.0	1,527	4.8	▼7.6
FDP	Zinke	409	1.3	▼2.3	229	0.7	▼2.8
DLW					94	0.3	
Values					55	0.2	
DKP					23	0.1	
Third Way					16	0.1	
Informal votes		546			319		
Total valid votes		31,608			31,835		
Turnout		32,154	65.6	▲12.9			
SPD hold	Majority	3,208	10.1				

=== 2019 election ===
State election (2019): Brandenburg an der Havel II
Notes:	Blue background denotes the winner of the electorate vote. Pink background denotes a candidate elected from their party list. Yellow background denotes an electorate win by a list member, or other incumbent. A ✓ or ✗ denotes status of any incumbent, win or lose respectively.						
Party	Candidate	Votes	%	±%	Party votes	%	±%
SPD	Britta Kornmesser	6,521	25.5	▼13.4	6,544	25.5	▼10.8
AfD	Axel Brösicke	5,271	20.6	▲10.7	5,419	21.1	▲10.8
CDU	Jean Schaffer	4,723	18.4	▼8.7	4,468	17.4	▼7.5
Left	Andreas Kutsche	3,270	12.8	▼3.8	2,628	10.2	▼7.2
Greens	René Blumenthal	2,696	10.5	▲4.4	3,181	12.4	▲6.3
BVB/FW	Norbert Langerwisch	2,203	8.6	▲7.2	1,493	5.8	▲5.0
FDP	Marc Puhlmann	928	3.6		902	3.5	▲2.5
Tierschutzpartei					674	2.6	
Pirates					172	0.7	▼0.9
ÖDP					169	0.7	
V-Partei3					61	0.2	
Informal votes		485			386		
Total valid votes		25,612			25,711		
Turnout		26,097	52.7	▲14.1			
SPD hold	Majority	1,250	4.9	▼6.9			

=== 2014 election ===
State election (2014): Brandenburg an der Havel II
Notes:	Blue background denotes the winner of the electorate vote. Pink background denotes a candidate elected from their party list. Yellow background denotes an electorate win by a list member, or other incumbent. A ✓ or ✗ denotes status of any incumbent, win or lose respectively.						
Party	Candidate	Votes	%	±%	Party votes	%	±%
SPD	✓ Ralf Holzchuher	7,429	38.9	▲4.7	6,959	36.3	▲0.1
CDU	Jean Schaffer	5,167	27.1	▲2.6	4,770	24.9	▲2.9
Left	René Kretzschmar	3,166	16.6	▼10.3	3,328	17.4	▼9.5
AfD	Klaus-Peter Fischer	1,891	9.9		1,973	10.3	
Greens	Yvonne Plaul	1,160	6.1	▲0.3	1,165	6.1	▲1.6
Pirates					298	1.6	
NPD					261	1.4	▼0.8
FDP					194	1.0	▼4.1
BVB/FW	Botho Deregoski	269	1.4	Steady	149	0.8	▼0.2
DKP					41	0.2	▲0.1
REP					28	0.1	Steady
Informal votes		407			323		
Total valid votes		19,082			19,166		
Turnout		19,489	38.6	▼22.2			
SPD hold	Majority	2,262	11.8	▲0.4			

=== 2009 election ===
State election (2009): Brandenburg and der Havel II
Notes:	Blue background denotes the winner of the electorate vote. Pink background denotes a candidate elected from their party list. Yellow background denotes an electorate win by a list member, or other incumbent. A ✓ or ✗ denotes status of any incumbent, win or lose respectively.						
Party	Candidate	Votes	%	±%	Party votes	%	±%
SPD	✓ Ralf Holzschuher	10,292	34.2	▲3.5	10,993	36.2	▼0.9
Left	René Kretzschmar	8,110	26.9	▼0.2	8,172	26.9	▲1.6
CDU	Walter Paaschen	7,366	24.5	▲1.2	6,681	22.0	▲2.1
Greens	Martina Marx	1,738	5.8	▲1.2	1,366	4.5	▲1.6
FDP	Andreas Heldt	1,423	4.7	▼2.6	1,539	5.1	▲2.2
NPD	Kersten Radzimanowski	767	2.5		658	2.2	
BVB/FW	Dieter Hückstädt	430	1.4		311	1.0	
DVU					272	0.9	▼4.9
RRP					182	0.6	
50Plus					123	0.4	▼0.2
REP					41	0.1	
Die-Volksinitiative					37	0.1	
DKP					34	0.1	
Informal votes		1,038			755		
Total valid votes		30,126			30,409		
Turnout		31,164	60.8	▲11.7			
SPD hold	Majority	2,182	7.3	▲3.7			

=== 2004 election ===
State election (2004): Brandenburg an der Havel II
Notes:	Blue background denotes the winner of the electorate vote. Pink background denotes a candidate elected from their party list. Yellow background denotes an electorate win by a list member, or other incumbent. A ✓ or ✗ denotes status of any incumbent, win or lose respectively.						
Party	Candidate	Votes	%	±%	Party votes	%	±%
SPD	Ralf Holzschuher	7,593	30.73		9,293	37.12	
PDS	René Kretzschmar	6,707	27.14		6,339	25.32	
CDU	Walter Paaschen	5,765	23.33		4,983	19.90	
DVU					1,445	5.77	
FDP	Jan Penkawa	1,806	7.31		726	2.90	
Greens	Erhard Gottschalk	1,142	4.62		727	2.90	
Familie					489	1.95	
Gray Panthers					270	1.08	
AUB-Brandenburg	Volker Dressler	848	3.43		247	0.99	
50Plus					150	0.60	
BRB					146	0.58	
AfW (Free Voters)	Markus Kriesel	585	2.37		93	0.37	
Yes Brandenburg	Denny Wichmann	264	1.07		60	0.24	
DKP					45	0.18	
Schill					23	0.09	
Informal votes		840			514		
Total valid votes		24,710			25,036		
Turnout		25,550	49.50				
SPD win new seat	Majority	886	3.59				

== See also ==
- Politics of Brandenburg
- Landtag of Brandenburg
