= Oder-Spree III =

State electoral district of Germany

30: Oder-Spree III
- Electoral district for the Landtag of Brandenburg
- Oder-Spree III in 2024
- District: Oder-Spree
- Electorate: 51,678 (2024)
- Major settlements: Beeskow and Fürstenwalde

Current electoral district
- Created: 1994
- Party: AfD
- Member: Kathleen Muxel

Oder-Spree III is an electoral constituency (German: Wahlkreis) represented in the Landtag of Brandenburg. It elects one member via first-past-the-post voting. Under the constituency numbering system, it is designated as constituency 30. It is located in within the district of Oder-Spree.

== Geography ==
The constituency includes the towns of Beeskow and Fürstenwalde, the communities of Grünheide and Rietz-Neuendorf, as well as the Odervorland district.

There were 51,678 eligible voters in 2024.

== Members ==
Election	Member	Party	%
2004	Stefan Sarrach	PDS	37.4
2009	Peer Jürgens	Left	30.6
2014	Elisabeth Alter	SPD	31.1
2019	Rolf-Peter Hooge	AfD	25.9
2024	Kathleen Muxel	AfD	36.9

== Election results ==
=== 2024 election ===
State election (2024): Oder-Spree III
Notes:	Blue background denotes the winner of the electorate vote. Pink background denotes a candidate elected from their party list. Yellow background denotes an electorate win by a list member, or other incumbent. A ✓ or ✗ denotes status of any incumbent, win or lose respectively.						
Party	Candidate	Votes	%	±%	Party votes	%	±%
AfD	Kathleen Muxel	13,082	36.9	▲11.0	12,145	34.0	▲6.9
SPD	Ulf Kühnel	10,129	28.6	▲5.1	9,415	26.4	▲2.5
BSW					5,267	14.8	
CDU	Rundorf	4,121	11.6	▼2.5	3,667	10.3	▼3.5
BVB/FW	Rudolph	3,604	10.2	▼0.1	1,150	3.2	▼3.8
Left	Wiedemann	1,761	5.0	▼8.9	1,038	2.9	▼8.2
DLW	Meise	1,375	3.9		552	1.5	
Greens	Scheufele	736	2.1	▼6.2	946	2.7	▼5.8
APT					837	2.3	▼0.7
FDP	Richter	652	1.8	▼2.2	217	0.6	▼3.4
Plus					298	0.8	▼0.7
Values					102	0.3	
Third Way					38	0.1	
DKP					22	0.1	
Informal votes		555			321		
Total valid votes		35,460			35,694		
Turnout		36,015	69.7	▲12.8			
AfD hold	Majority	2,953	8.3	▲5.9			

=== 2019 election ===
State election (2019): Oder-Spree III
Notes:	Blue background denotes the winner of the electorate vote. Pink background denotes a candidate elected from their party list. Yellow background denotes an electorate win by a list member, or other incumbent. A ✓ or ✗ denotes status of any incumbent, win or lose respectively.						
Party	Candidate	Votes	%	±%	Party votes	%	±%
AfD	Rolf-Peter Hooge	7,557	25.9		7,916	27.1	▲12.8
SPD	Marco Genschmar	6,843	23.5	▼7.6	6,986	23.9	▼6.5
CDU	Karin Lehmann	4,107	14.1	▼8.4	4,016	13.7	▼6.8
Left	Stephan Wende	4,044	13.9	▼9.9	3,242	11.1	▼8.2
BVB/FW	Kai Hamacher	2,994	10.3	▲4.1	2,045	7.0	▲4.6
Greens	Isabel Hiekel	2,420	8.3	▲2.3	2,458	8.4	▲3.1
FDP	Thomas Kirsch	1,187	4.1	▲2.3	1,166	4.0	▲2.4
Tierschutzpartei					885	3.0	
ÖDP					231	0.8	
Pirates					216	0.7	▼0.9
V-Partei3					58	0.2	
Informal votes		461			394		
Total valid votes		29,152			29,219		
Turnout		29,613	56.9	▲11.9			
AfD gain from SPD	Majority	714	2.4				

=== 2014 election ===
State election (2014): Oder-Spree III
Notes:	Blue background denotes the winner of the electorate vote. Pink background denotes a candidate elected from their party list. Yellow background denotes an electorate win by a list member, or other incumbent. A ✓ or ✗ denotes status of any incumbent, win or lose respectively.						
Party	Candidate	Votes	%	±%	Party votes	%	±%
SPD	Elisabeth Alter	7,183	31.1	▲0.7	7,060	30.4	▼1.0
Left	✗ Peer Jürgens	5,512	23.8	▼6.8	4,494	19.3	▼10.6
CDU	Dierk Homeyer	5,192	22.5	▲2.8	4,767	20.5	▲2.3
AfD					3,328	14.3	
NPD	Manuela Kokott	1,609	7.0	▲3.2	961	4.1	▲0.7
BVB/FW	Willy Hagemann	1,426	6.2	▲5.1	565	2.4	▲1.3
Greens	Jens-Olaf Zänker	1,376	6.0	▲0.3	1,225	5.3	▼0.1
FDP	Dr. Manfred Dietrich	414	1.8	▼5.3	381	1.6	▼6.0
Pirates	Angelika Meier	404	1.7		370	1.6	
DKP					57	0.2	▲0.1
REP					41	0.2	Steady
Informal votes		506			373		
Total valid votes		23,116			23,249		
Turnout		23,622	45.0	▼19.0			
SPD gain from Left	Majority	1,671	8.6				

=== 2009 election ===
State election (2009): Oder-Spree III
Notes:	Blue background denotes the winner of the electorate vote. Pink background denotes a candidate elected from their party list. Yellow background denotes an electorate win by a list member, or other incumbent. A ✓ or ✗ denotes status of any incumbent, win or lose respectively.						
Party	Candidate	Votes	%	±%	Party votes	%	±%
Left	Peer Jürgens	10,131	30.6	▼6.8	9,952	29.9	▼1.4
SPD	Elisabeth Alter	10,061	30.4	▲2.9	10,468	31.4	▲1.5
CDU	Armin Gebauer	6,501	19.7	▼1.1	6,069	18.2	▼0.4
FDP	Axel Fachtan	2,357	7.1	▲2.3	2,535	7.6	▲4.4
Greens	Sabine Niels	1,887	5.7	▲2.4	1,809	5.4	▲2.3
NPD	Manuela Kokott	1,260	3.8		1,127	3.4	
50Plus	Meinhard Gutowski	500	1.5		324	1.0	▼0.2
BVB/FW	Jörg Pohl	377	1.1		383	1.1	
DVU					341	1.0	▼5.6
RRP					122	0.4	
Die-Volksinitiative					77	0.2	
REP					57	0.2	
DKP					49	0.1	Steady
Informal votes		1,117			878		
Total valid votes		33,074			33,313		
Turnout		34,191	64.0	▲9.7			
Left hold	Majority	70	0.2	▼9.7			

=== 2004 election ===
State election (2004): Oder-Spree III
Notes:	Blue background denotes the winner of the electorate vote. Pink background denotes a candidate elected from their party list. Yellow background denotes an electorate win by a list member, or other incumbent. A ✓ or ✗ denotes status of any incumbent, win or lose respectively.						
Party	Candidate	Votes	%	±%	Party votes	%	±%
PDS	Stefan Sarrach	10,533	37.43		8,876	31.31	
SPD	Elisabeth Alter	7,745	27.52		8,472	29.89	
CDU	Wolfgang Petenati	5,843	20.76		5,263	18.57	
DVU					1,879	6.63	
FDP	Steffen Adam	1,360	4.83		905	3.19	
AfW (Free Voters)	Barbara Plenzke	1,203	4.27		320	1.13	
Greens	Peter Kammer	940	3.34		884	3.12	
Familie					687	2.42	
50Plus					354	1.25	
Gray Panthers					221	0.78	
AUB-Brandenburg					161	0.57	
Schill	Rainer Jonas	520	1.85		102	0.36	
BRB					101	0.36	
Yes Brandenburg					87	0.31	
DKP					36	0.13	
Informal votes		875			671		
Total valid votes		28,144			28,348		
Turnout		29,019	54.32				
PDS win new seat	Majority	2,788	9.91				

== See also ==
- Politics of Brandenburg
- Landtag of Brandenburg
