= Brandenburg an der Havel I/Potsdam-Mittelmark I =

State electoral district of Germany

16: Brandenburg an der Havel I/Potsdam-Mittelmark I
- Electoral district for the Landtag of Brandenburg
- Brandenburg an der Havel I/Potsdam-Mittelmark I in 2024
- District: Potsdam-Mittelmark
- Electorate: 52,468 (2024)
- Major settlements: Brandenburg an der Havel (partial)

Current electoral district
- Created: 1994
- Party: SPD
- Member: Udo Wernitz

Brandenburg an der Havel I/Potsdam-Mittelmark I is an electoral constituency (German: Wahlkreis) represented in the Landtag of Brandenburg. It elects one member via first-past-the-post voting. Under the constituency numbering system, it is designated as constituency 16. It is located in across the city of Brandenburg an der Havel and Potsdam-Mittelmark district.

== Geography ==
The constituency includes the districts of Görden and Plaue of Brandenburg an der Havel, as well as the Potsdam-Mittelmark communities of Groß Kreutz and Kloster Lehnin, and the administrative divisions of Beetzsee, Brück, Wusterwitz, and Ziesar.

There were 52,468 eligible voters in 2024.

== Members ==
Election	Member	Party	%
2004	Andreas Kuhnert	SPD	30.3
2009	Andreas Kuhnert	SPD	33.0
2014	Andreas Kuhnert	SPD	39.0
2019	Udo Wernitz	SPD	26.3
2024	Udo Wernitz	SPD	32.1

== Election results ==
=== 2024 election ===
State election (2024): Brandenburg an der Havel I / Potsdam-Mittelmark I
Notes:	Blue background denotes the winner of the electorate vote. Pink background denotes a candidate elected from their party list. Yellow background denotes an electorate win by a list member, or other incumbent. A ✓ or ✗ denotes status of any incumbent, win or lose respectively.						
Party	Candidate	Votes	%	±%	Party votes	%	±%
SPD	✓ Udo Wernitz	12,246	32.1	▲4.4	11,646	30.4	▲2.4
AfD	Lars Hünich	12,047	31.6	▲10.0	11,256	29.3	▲6.5
BSW					5,568	14.5	
CDU	Bolz	8,381	22.0	▲2.6	5,318	13.9	▼4.0
BVB/FW	Schulz	2,515	6.6	▼1.1	969	2.5	▼2.8
Left	Wipfli	1,601	4.2	▼5.8	869	2.3	▼6.8
Greens	Stroncik	782	2.0	▼7.0	1,158	3.0	▼6.0
Tierschutzpartei					754	2.0	▼0.6
Plus					269	0.7	▼0.4
FDP	Dr. Kraatz	575	1.5	▼2.4	268	0.7	▼3.3
DLW					176	0.5	
Values					61	0.2	
Third Way					29	0.1	
DKP					26	0.1	
Informal votes		546			326		
Total valid votes		38,147			38,367		
Turnout		38,693	73.7	▲13.0			
SPD hold	Majority	199	0.5				

=== 2019 election ===
State election (2019): Brandenburg (Havel) I/Potsdam-Mittelmark I
Notes:	Blue background denotes the winner of the electorate vote. Pink background denotes a candidate elected from their party list. Yellow background denotes an electorate win by a list member, or other incumbent. A ✓ or ✗ denotes status of any incumbent, win or lose respectively.						
Party	Candidate	Votes	%	±%	Party votes	%	±%
SPD	Udo Wernitz	6,649	26.3	▼12.7	6,964	27.5	▼8.7
AfD	Lars Hünich	5,519	21.8		5,827	23.0	▲12.0
CDU	Franz Herbert Schäfer	5,166	20.4	▼8.9	4,668	18.4	▼6.8
Left	Dr. Andreas Bernig	2,674	10.6	▼8.3	2,341	9.2	▼7.8
Greens	Vincent Bartolain	2,167	7.4	▲2.3	1,274	5.0	▲3.6
BVB/FW	Thomas Schulz	1,884	7.4	▲2.3	1,274	5.0	▲3.6
FDP	Matti Karstedt	1,059	4.2	▲1.9	1,021	4.0	▲2.5
Tierschutzpartei					646	2.5	
German Conservative	Corinna Conrad	177	0.7				
Pirates					160	0.6	▼0.5
ÖDP					119	0.5	
V-Partei3					59	0.2	
Informal votes		438			385		
Total valid votes		25,295			25,348		
Turnout		25,733	59.4	▲15.5			
SPD hold	Majority	1,130	4.5	▼5.2			

=== 2014 election ===
State election (2014): Brandenburg an der Havel I/Potsdam-Mittelmark I
Notes:	Blue background denotes the winner of the electorate vote. Pink background denotes a candidate elected from their party list. Yellow background denotes an electorate win by a list member, or other incumbent. A ✓ or ✗ denotes status of any incumbent, win or lose respectively.						
Party	Candidate	Votes	%	±%	Party votes	%	±%
SPD	✓ Andreas Kuhnert	7,331	39.0	▲6.0	6,873	36.2	▲1.1
CDU	Dr. Knut Große	5,508	29.3	▲4.5	4,778	25.2	▲3.4
Left	Dr. Andreas Bernig	3,549	18.9	▼8.5	3,218	17.0	▼9.1
AfD					2,080	11.0	
BVB/FW	Thomas Schulz	959	5.1	▲3.0	270	1.4	Steady
Greens	Karl-Heinz Schulze	798	4.2	▲0.5	853	4.5	▲0.7
NPD					335	1.8	▼1.1
FDP	Matti Karstedt	437	2.3	▼2.7	287	1.5	▼5.0
Pirates					206	1.1	
Independent	Thomas Rödiger	203	1.1				
REP					40	0.2	Steady
DKP					35	0.2	▲0.1
Informal votes		471			281		
Total valid votes		18,785			18,975		
Turnout		19,256	43.9	▼20.1			
SPD hold	Majority	1,823	9.7	▲4.1			

=== 2009 election ===
State election (2009): Brandenburg an der Havel I / Potsdam-Mittelmark I
Notes:	Blue background denotes the winner of the electorate vote. Pink background denotes a candidate elected from their party list. Yellow background denotes an electorate win by a list member, or other incumbent. A ✓ or ✗ denotes status of any incumbent, win or lose respectively.						
Party	Candidate	Votes	%	±%	Party votes	%	±%
SPD	✓ Andreas Kuhnert	9,308	33.0	▲2.7	9,972	35.1	▲2.7
Left	Bernd Lachmann	7,744	27.4	▼1.6	7,411	26.1	Steady
CDU	Knut Große	7,001	24.8	▼0.2	6,190	21.8	Steady
FDP	Florian Linckus	1,422	5.0	▲0.1	1,839	6.5	▲2.9
Greens	Martin Köhler	1,058	3.7	▲0.7	1,093	3.8	▲1.1
NPD	Christian Schuh	967	3.4		830	2.9	
BVB/FW	Thomas Schulz	605	2.1		391	1.4	
DVU					357	1.3	▼5.4
RRP					131	0.5	
Independent	Olaf Leonhardt	129	0.5				
50Plus					97	0.3	Steady
Die-Volksinitiative					54	0.2	
REP					51	0.2	
DKP					22	0.1	Steady
Informal votes		1,054			850		
Total valid votes		28,234			28,438		
Turnout		29,288	64.0	▲11.0			
SPD hold	Majority	1,564	5.6	▲4.3			

=== 2004 election ===
State election (2004): Brandenburg an der Havel I / Potsdam-Mittelmark I
Notes:	Blue background denotes the winner of the electorate vote. Pink background denotes a candidate elected from their party list. Yellow background denotes an electorate win by a list member, or other incumbent. A ✓ or ✗ denotes status of any incumbent, win or lose respectively.						
Party	Candidate	Votes	%	±%	Party votes	%	±%
SPD	Andreas Kuhnert	7,245	30.32		7,808	32.37	
PDS	Bernd Lachmann	6,938	29.03		6,300	26.12	
CDU	Knut Große	5,980	25.02		5,262	21.82	
DVU					1,606	6.66	
FDP	Hans-Joachim Gappert	1,168	4.89		876	3.63	
Familie					701	2.91	
Gray Panthers	Marija Urbanc	809	3.39		306	1.27	
Greens	Martin Köhler	712	2.98		648	2.69	
AUB-Brandenburg	Manfred Friedrich	581	2.43		167	0.69	
Yes Brandenburg	Peter Möller	465	1.95		138	0.57	
BRB					121	0.50	
50Plus					82	0.34	
AfW (Free Voters)					58	0.24	
DKP					28	0.12	
Schill					18	0.07	
Informal votes		751			530		
Total valid votes		23,898			24,119		
Turnout		24,649	52.98				
SPD win new seat	Majority	307	1.29				

== See also ==
- Politics of Brandenburg
- Landtag of Brandenburg
