= Havelland I (electoral district) =

State electoral district of Germany

5: Havelland I
- Electoral district for the Landtag of Brandenburg
- Havelland I in 2024
- District: Havelland
- Electorate: 49,168 (2024)
- Major settlements: Nauen and Ketzin

Current electoral district
- Created: 1994
- Party: SPD
- Member: Johannes Funke

Havelland I is an electoral constituency (German: Wahlkreis) represented in the Landtag of Brandenburg. It elects one member via first-past-the-post voting. Under the constituency numbering system, it is designated as constituency 5. It is located in the Havelland district.

== Geography ==
The constituency includes the towns of Nauen and Ketzin, as well as the community of Brieselang and Wustermark, and the administrative divisions of Nennhausen and Friesack.

There were 49,168 eligible voters in 2024.

== Members ==
| Election | Member | Party | % |
|---|---|---|---|
| 2004 | Udo Folgart | SPD | 33.1 |
| 2009 | Udo Folgart | SPD | 34.7 |
| 2014 | Udo Folgart | SPD | 36.5 |
| 2019 | Johannes Funke | SPD | 25.3 |
| 2024 | Johannes Funke | SPD | 36.1 |

== Election results ==
=== 2024 election ===
State election (2024): Havelland I
| Notes: | Blue background denotes the winner of the electorate vote. Pink background denotes a candidate elected from their party list. Yellow background denotes an electorate win by a list member, or other incumbent. A ✓ or ✗ denotes status of any incumbent, win or lose respectively. | | | | | | |
| Party | Candidate | Votes | % | ±% | Party votes | % | ±% |
|---|---|---|---|---|---|---|---|
| SPD | ✓ Johannes Funke | 12,486 | 36.1 | ▲10.8 | 11,409 | 32.9 | ▲6.2 |
| AfD | Dominik Kaufner | 11,830 | 34.2 | ▲9.3 | 10,664 | 30.7 | ▲6.3 |
| CDU | Margarita Stark | 5,387 | 15.6 | ▼0.6 | 4,290 | 12.4 | ▼3.1 |
| BSW | | | | | 3,969 | 11.4 | |
| BVB/FW | Julia Schmohl | 1,705 | 4.9 | ▼2.8 | 620 | 1.8 | ▼3.0 |
| Left | Andrea Johlige | 1,362 | 3.9 | ▼6.4 | 812 | 2.3 | ▼6.8 |
| Greens | Anja Stamm | 919 | 2.7 | ▼9.1 | 1,306 | 3.8 | ▼7.2 |
| DLW | Tino Müller | 462 | 1.3 | | 229 | 0.7 | |
| FDP | Marcel Wilfried Richter | 445 | 1.3 | ▼2.5 | 296 | 0.9 | ▼3.0 |
| Tierschutzpartei | | | | | 737 | 2.1 | ▼1.0 |
| Plus | | | | | 269 | 0.8 | ▼0.5 |
| Values | | | | | 69 | 0.2 | |
| Third Way | | | | | 38 | 0.1 | |
| DKP | | | | | 13 | 0.0 | |
| Informal votes | | 437 | | | 312 | | |
| Total valid votes | | 34,596 | | | 34,721 | | |
| Turnout | | 35,033 | 71.3 | ▲12.0 | | | |
| SPD hold | Majority | 656 | 1.9 | ▲1.5 | | | |

=== 2019 election ===
State election (2019): Havelland I
| Notes: | Blue background denotes the winner of the electorate vote. Pink background denotes a candidate elected from their party list. Yellow background denotes an electorate win by a list member, or other incumbent. A ✓ or ✗ denotes status of any incumbent, win or lose respectively. | | | | | | |
| Party | Candidate | Votes | % | ±% | Party votes | % | ±% |
|---|---|---|---|---|---|---|---|
| SPD | Johannes Funke | 6,949 | 25.3 | ▼11.2 | 7,330 | 26.6 | ▼7.5 |
| AfD | Dominik Kaufner | 6,852 | 24.9 | ▲11.7 | 6,722 | 24.4 | ▲11.8 |
| CDU | Marcus Welzel | 4,447 | 16.2 | ▼6.1 | 4,262 | 15.5 | ▼5.8 |
| Greens | Petra Budke | 3,240 | 11.8 | ▲5.5 | 3,029 | 11.0 | ▲4.6 |
| Left | Andrea Johlige | 2,844 | 10.3 | ▼6.0 | 2,514 | 9.1 | ▼8.0 |
| BVB/FW | Christian Ehrecke | 2,114 | 7.7 | ▲4.5 | 1,319 | 4.8 | ▲2.9 |
| FDP | Volkmar Richter | 1,034 | 3.8 | | 1,049 | 3.8 | ▲2.3 |
| Tierschutzpartei | | | | | 869 | 3.2 | |
| Pirates | | | | | 176 | 0.6 | ▼1.3 |
| ÖDP | | | | | 162 | 0.6 | |
| V-Partei3 | | | | | 79 | 0.3 | |
| Informal votes | | 464 | | | 433 | | |
| Total valid votes | | 27,480 | | | 27,511 | | |
| Turnout | | 27,944 | 59.2 | ▲16.6 | | | |
| SPD hold | Majority | 97 | 0.4 | ▼13.8 | | | |

=== 2014 election ===
State election (2014): Havelland I
| Notes: | Blue background denotes the winner of the electorate vote. Pink background denotes a candidate elected from their party list. Yellow background denotes an electorate win by a list member, or other incumbent. A ✓ or ✗ denotes status of any incumbent, win or lose respectively. | | | | | | |
| Party | Candidate | Votes | % | ±% | Party votes | % | ±% |
|---|---|---|---|---|---|---|---|
| SPD | ✓ Udo Folgart | 6,949 | 36.5 | ▲1.8 | 6,508 | 34.1 | ▼1.7 |
| CDU | Michael Koch | 4,242 | 22.3 | ▲2.0 | 4,059 | 21.3 | ▲3.0 |
| Left | Andrea Johlige | 3,096 | 16.3 | ▼9.4 | 3,265 | 17.1 | ▼7.3 |
| AfD | Gerald Hübner | 2,520 | 13.2 | | 2,407 | 12.6 | |
| Greens | Ingelborg Kalischer | 1,194 | 6.3 | ▲0.9 | 1,213 | 6.4 | ▲1.4 |
| NPD | | | | | 536 | 2.8 | ▼0.5 |
| BVB/FW | Alexander Schmunk | 618 | 3.2 | ▲0.3 | 356 | 1.9 | ▲0.1 |
| Pirates | Raimond Heydt | 407 | 2.1 | | 359 | 1.9 | |
| FDP | | | | | 291 | 1.5 | ▼6.5 |
| REP | | | | | 45 | 0.2 | Steady |
| DKP | | | | | 35 | 0.2 | ▲0.1 |
| Informal votes | | 361 | | | 313 | | |
| Total valid votes | | 19,026 | | | 19,074 | | |
| Turnout | | 19,387 | 42.6 | ▼21.8 | | | |
| SPD hold | Majority | 2,707 | 14.2 | ▲5.2 | | | |

=== 2009 election ===
State election (2009): Havelland I
| Notes: | Blue background denotes the winner of the electorate vote. Pink background denotes a candidate elected from their party list. Yellow background denotes an electorate win by a list member, or other incumbent. A ✓ or ✗ denotes status of any incumbent, win or lose respectively. | | | | | | |
| Party | Candidate | Votes | % | ±% | Party votes | % | ±% |
|---|---|---|---|---|---|---|---|
| SPD | ✓ Udo Folgart | 9,655 | 34.7 | ▲1.6 | 10,018 | 35.8 | ▲2.0 |
| Left | Jörg Schönberg | 7,144 | 25.7 | ▼4.6 | 6,843 | 24.4 | ▼1.5 |
| CDU | Michael Koch | 5,635 | 20.3 | ▼1.1 | 5,140 | 18.3 | ▼1.1 |
| FDP | Erhard Zeine | 2,017 | 7.3 | ▲2.7 | 2,233 /0 | 8.0 | ▲4.5 |
| Greens | Felix Doepner | 1,500 | 5.4 | ▲1.9 | 1,391 | 5.0 | ▲1.6 |
| NPD | Maik Schneider | 1,049 | 3.8 | | 938 | 3.3 | |
| BVB/FW | Alexander Schmunk | 815 | 2.9 | | 504 | 1.8 | |
| DVU | | | | | 303 | 1.1 | ▼6.1 |
| Die-Volksinitiative | | | | | 301 | 1.1 | |
| RRP | | | | | 133 | 0.5 | |
| 50Plus | | | | | 113 | 0.4 | ▼0.4 |
| REP | | | | | 70 | 0.2 | |
| DKP | | | | | 33 | 0.1 | Steady |
| Informal votes | | 1,021 | | | 816 | | |
| Total valid votes | | 27,815 | | | 28,020 | | |
| Turnout | | 28,836 | 64.4 | ▲11.9 | | | |
| SPD hold | Majority | 2,511 | 9.0 | ▲6.2 | | | |

=== 2004 election ===
State election (2004): Havelland I
| Notes: | Blue background denotes the winner of the electorate vote. Pink background denotes a candidate elected from their party list. Yellow background denotes an electorate win by a list member, or other incumbent. A ✓ or ✗ denotes status of any incumbent, win or lose respectively. | | | | | | |
| Party | Candidate | Votes | % | ±% | Party votes | % | ±% |
|---|---|---|---|---|---|---|---|
| SPD | Udo Folgart | 7,254 | 33.11 | | 7,490 | 33.78 | |
| PDS | Brigitte Noel | 6,648 | 30.34 | | 5,732 | 25.85 | |
| CDU | Michael Koch | 4,694 | 21.42 | | 4,310 | 19.44 | |
| DVU | | | | | 1,589 | 7.17 | |
| FDP | Michael Stroh | 1,015 | 4.63 | | 781 | 3.52 | |
| Greens | Felix Doepner | 774 | 3.53 | | 754 | 3.40 | |
| Familie | | | | | 597 | 2.69 | |
| The Grays – Gray Panthers | | | | | 231 | 1.04 | |
| BRB | Hans-Joachim Christ | 687 | 3.14 | | 184 | 0.83 | |
| 50Plus | | | | | 167 | 0.75 | |
| AfW (Free Voters) | Herbert Jecht | 598 | 2.73 | | 153 | 0.69 | |
| Yes Brandenburg | Christof Schmidt | 240 | 1.10 | | 84 | 0.38 | |
| AUB-Brandenburg | | | | | 44 | 0.20 | |
| Schill | | | | | 30 | 0.14 | |
| DKP | | | | | 24 | 0.11 | |
| Informal votes | | 747 | | | 487 | | |
| Total valid votes | | 21,910 | | | 22,170 | | |
| Turnout | | 22,657 | 52.47 | | | | |
| SPD win new seat | Majority | 606 | 2.77 | | | | |

== See also ==
- Politics of Brandenburg
- Landtag of Brandenburg
