= Potsdam-Mittelmark II =

State electoral district of Germany

18: Potsdam-Mittelmark II
- Electoral district for the Landtag of Brandenburg
- Potsdam-Mittelmark II in 2024
- District: Potsdam-Mittelmark
- Electorate: 57,301 (2024)
- Major settlements: Beelitz, Bad Belzig, and Wiesenburg

Current electoral district
- Created: 1994
- Party: SPD
- Member: Melanie Balzer

Potsdam-Mittelmark II is an electoral constituency (German: Wahlkreis) represented in the Landtag of Brandenburg. It elects one member via first-past-the-post voting. Under the constituency numbering system, it is designated as constituency 18. It is located in the district of Potsdam-Mittelmark.

== Geography ==
The constituency includes the towns of Beelitz, Bad Belzig, as well as the communities of Seddiner See, Michendorf and Wiesenburg, and the districts of Brück and Niemegk.

There were 57,301 eligible voters in 2024.

== Members ==
Election	Member	Party	%
2004	Günter Baaske	SPD	38.2
2009	Günter Baaske	SPD	41.8
2014	Günter Baaske	SPD	44.9
2019	Günter Baaske	SPD	36.3
2024	Melanie Balzer	SPD	38.3

== Election results ==
=== 2024 election ===
State election (2024): Potsdam-Mittelmark II
Notes:	Blue background denotes the winner of the electorate vote. Pink background denotes a candidate elected from their party list. Yellow background denotes an electorate win by a list member, or other incumbent. A ✓ or ✗ denotes status of any incumbent, win or lose respectively.						
Party	Candidate	Votes	%	±%	Party votes	%	±%
SPD	Melanie Balzer	16,809	38.3	▲4.2	15,092	34.2	▲4.8
AfD	Peer Dorow	11,068	25.2	▲7.7	10,127	22.9	▲4.2
BSW					6,073	13.8	
CDU	Schreinicke	8,060	18.4	▲2.8	5,775	13.1	▼2.3
BVB/FW	Simmes	3,297	7.5	▼1.6	1,062	2.4	▼3.1
Left	Frey	2,266	5.2	▼3.7	1,242	2.8	▼6.8
Greens	Wessel	1,790	4.1	▼7.4	2,652	6.0	▼7.2
Tierschutzpartei					934	2.1	▼0.2
FDP	Krohn	593	1.4	▼2.0	454	1.0	▼3.5
Plus					392	0.9	▼0.3
DLW					156	0.4	
Values					102	0.2	
Third Way					42	0.1	
DKP					31	0.1	
Informal votes		585			334		
Total valid votes		43,883			44,134		
Turnout		44,468	77.6	▲10.1			
SPD hold	Majority	5,741	13.1				

=== 2019 election ===
State election (2019): Potsdam-Mittelmark II
Notes:	Blue background denotes the winner of the electorate vote. Pink background denotes a candidate elected from their party list. Yellow background denotes an electorate win by a list member, or other incumbent. A ✓ or ✗ denotes status of any incumbent, win or lose respectively.						
Party	Candidate	Votes	%	±%	Party votes	%	±%
SPD	✓ Günter Baaske	13,509	36.3	▼8.6	11,261	30.2	▼7.0
AfD	Kai Kristian Laubach	6,865	18.4	▲8.5	7,320	19.7	▲9.1
CDU	Anja Schmollack	5,692	15.3	▼5.7	5,719	15.4	▼6.6
Greens	Andreas Koska	3,986	10.7	▲4.5	4,437	11.9	▲5.4
Left	Claudia Sprengel	3,127	8.4	▼5.7	3,452	9.3	▼6.7
BVB/FW	Dr. Winfried Ludwig	2,833	7.6	▲5.1	2,023	5.4	▲3.1
FDP	Tim Kehrwieder	1,205	3.2		1,572	4.2	▲2.6
Tierschutzpartei					901	2.4	
Pirates					260	0.7	▼1.0
ÖDP					200	0.5	
V-Partei3					90	0.2	
Informal votes		483			465		
Total valid votes		37,217			37,235		
Turnout		37,700	66.9	▲14.2			
SPD hold	Majority	6,644	17.9	▼6.0			

=== 2014 election ===
State election (2014): Potsdam-Mittelmark II
Notes:	Blue background denotes the winner of the electorate vote. Pink background denotes a candidate elected from their party list. Yellow background denotes an electorate win by a list member, or other incumbent. A ✓ or ✗ denotes status of any incumbent, win or lose respectively.						
Party	Candidate	Votes	%	±%	Party votes	%	±%
SPD	✓ Günter Baaske	13,073	44.9	▲4.9	10,855	37.2	▼0.3
CDU	Ludwig Burkardt	6,098	21.0	▲1.7	6,428	22.0	▲3.7
Left	Astrit Rabinowitsch	4,091	14.1	▼9.5	4,673	16.0	▼7.8
AfD	Sven Schröder	2,887	9.9		3,088	10.6	
Greens	Dr. Elke Seidel	1,814	6.2	▲0.2	1,885	6.5	▲0.3
BVB/FW	Bärbel Schüler	738	2.5	▲0.9	659	2.3	▲0.8
NPD					519	1.8	▼0.2
Pirates	Gerhard Luhmer	401	1.4		484	1.7	
FDP					460	1.6	▼6.0
DKP					61	0.2	Steady
REP					51	0.2	Steady
Informal votes		522			461		
Total valid votes		29,102			29,163		
Turnout		29,624	52.7	▼17.2			
SPD hold	Majority	6,975	23.9	▲7.5			

=== 2009 election ===
State election (2009): Potsdam-Mittelmark II
Notes:	Blue background denotes the winner of the electorate vote. Pink background denotes a candidate elected from their party list. Yellow background denotes an electorate win by a list member, or other incumbent. A ✓ or ✗ denotes status of any incumbent, win or lose respectively.						
Party	Candidate	Votes	%	±%	Party votes	%	±%
SPD	✓ Günter Baaske	13,156	41.8	▲3.6	12,173	38.5	▲3.1
Left	Astrit Rabinowitsch	7,628	24.2	▼0.7	7,754	24.5	▼1.2
CDU	Ludwig Burkardt	5,583	17.7	▼0.9	5,624	17.8	▼1.3
FDP	Dietmar Hummel	1,818	5.8	▲1.0	2,273	7.2	▲3.7
Greens	Elke Siedel	1,729	5.5	▲1.4	1,687	5.3	▲1.3
NPD	Jens Kramp	763	2.4		664	2.1	
BVB/FW	Tino Schwäbisch	508	1.6		486	1.5	
DVU					328	1.0	▼4.1
Independent	Amrei Wolf	283	0.9				
RRP					194	0.6	
Die-Volksinitiative					151	0.5	
50Plus					144	0.5	Steady
DKP					55	0.2	Steady
REP					54	0.2	
Informal votes		1,167			1,048		
Total valid votes		31,468			31,587		
Turnout		32,635	68.5	▲9.7			
SPD hold	Majority	5,528	17.6	▲4.3			

=== 2004 election ===
State election (2004): Potsdam-Mittelmark II
Notes:	Blue background denotes the winner of the electorate vote. Pink background denotes a candidate elected from their party list. Yellow background denotes an electorate win by a list member, or other incumbent. A ✓ or ✗ denotes status of any incumbent, win or lose respectively.						
Party	Candidate	Votes	%	±%	Party votes	%	±%
SPD	Günter Baaske	10,535	38.22		9,801	35.43	
PDS	Astrit Rabinowitsch	6,871	24.93		7,099	25.66	
CDU	Dieter Braune	5,124	18.59		5,274	19.07	
DVU					1,408	5.09	
FDP	Andreas Gronemeier	1,323	4.80		981	3.55	
Greens	Elke Seidel	1,122	4.07		1,117	4.04	
Familie					686	2.48	
Gray Panthers	Frank Baier	863	3.13		561	2.03	
Independent	Karl-Ernst Schüler	625	2.27				
AfW (Free Voters)	Herbert Grüneberg	547	1,98		146	0.53	
BRB					136	0.49	
50Plus					125	0.45	
Yes Brandenburg	Mario Genth	292	1.06		121	0.44	
AUB-Brandenburg	Nikolaus Metz	263	0.95		121	0.44	
DKP					62	0.22	
Schill					24	0.09	
Informal votes		829			732		
Total valid votes		27,565			27,662		
Turnout		28,394	58.81				
SPD win new seat	Majority	3,664	13.29				

== See also ==
- Politics of Brandenburg
- Landtag of Brandenburg
