= Barnim I (electoral district) =

State electoral district of Germany

13: Barnim I
- Electoral district for the Landtag of Brandenburg
- Barnim I in 2024
- District: Barnim
- Electorate: 46,467 (2024)
- Major settlements: Eberswalde

Current electoral district
- Created: 1994
- Party: AfD
- Member: Roman Kuffert

Barnim I is an electoral constituency (German: Wahlkreis) represented in the Landtag of Brandenburg. It elects one member via first-past-the-post voting. Under the constituency numbering system, it is designated as constituency 13. It is located in the Barnim district.

== Geography ==
The constituency includes the town of Eberswalde, as well as the municipality of Schorfheide, and the administrative division of Joachimsthal, Brandenburg.

There were 46,467 eligible voters in 2024.

== Members ==
Election	Member	Party	%
2004	Margitta Mächtig	PDS	35.7
2009	Margitta Mächtig	Left	34.3
2014	Daniel Kurth	SPD	28.0
2019	Hardy Lux	SPD	23.9
2024	Roman Kuffert	AfD	32.8

== Election results ==
=== 2024 election ===
State election (2024): Barnim I
Notes:	Blue background denotes the winner of the electorate vote. Pink background denotes a candidate elected from their party list. Yellow background denotes an electorate win by a list member, or other incumbent. A ✓ or ✗ denotes status of any incumbent, win or lose respectively.						
Party	Candidate	Votes	%	±%	Party votes	%	±%
AfD	Roman Kuffert	9,990	32.8	▲9.6	9,160	29.9	▲6.1
SPD	Kurt Fischer	9,238	30.4	▲6.5	8,568	28.0	▲2.5
CDU	Jur	3,993	13.1	▼2.8	3,150	10.3	▼4.1
Left	Walter	3,418	11.2	▼4.7	1,909	6.2	▼6.9
BSW					4,354	14.2	
BVB/FW	Weller	1,919	6.3	▼1.4	653	2.1	▼3.1
Greens	Wiebke	863	2.8	▼7.5	1,348	4.4	▼6.2
Tierschutzpartei					595	1.9	▼0.5
Plus					339	1.1	▼0.5
FDP	Maskow	816	2.7	▼0.3	309	1.0	▼2.2
dieBasis	Schubert	201	0.7				
DLW					113	0.4	
Values					71	0.2	
Third Way					30	0.1	
DKP					24	0.1	
Informal votes		456			270		
Total valid votes		30,438			30,624		
Turnout		30,894	66.5	▲14.2			
AfD gain from SPD	Majority	752	2.2				

=== 2019 election ===
State election (2019): Barnim I
Notes:	Blue background denotes the winner of the electorate vote. Pink background denotes a candidate elected from their party list. Yellow background denotes an electorate win by a list member, or other incumbent. A ✓ or ✗ denotes status of any incumbent, win or lose respectively.						
Party	Candidate	Votes	%	±%	Party votes	%	±%
SPD	Hardy Lux	5,766	23.9	▼4.1	6,179	25.5	▼6.1
AfD	Roman Kuffert	5,622	23.3	▲13.6	5,768	23.8	▲13.8
CDU	Danko Jur	3,854	16.0	▼9.0	3,483	14.4	▼9.1
Left	Sebastian Walter	3,837	15.9	▼7.6	3,186	13.2	▼8.0
Greens	Axel Vogel	2,499	10.3	▲4.4	2,560	10.6	▲4.7
BVB/FW	Sven Weller	1,850	7.7	▲4.2	1,267	5.2	▲3.7
FDP	Ronny Fölsner	732	3.0	Steady	771	3.2	▲0.9
Tierschutzpartei					586	2.4	
ÖDP					213	0.9	
Pirates					165	0.7	▼0.6
V-Partei3					48	0.2	
Informal votes		361			295		
Total valid votes		24,160			24,226		
Turnout		24,521	52.3	▲10.6			
SPD hold	Majority	144	0.6	▼2.4			

=== 2014 election ===
State election (2014): Barnim I
Notes:	Blue background denotes the winner of the electorate vote. Pink background denotes a candidate elected from their party list. Yellow background denotes an electorate win by a list member, or other incumbent. A ✓ or ✗ denotes status of any incumbent, win or lose respectively.						
Party	Candidate	Votes	%	±%	Party votes	%	±%
SPD	Daniel Kurth	5,372	28.0	▲0.7	6,077	31.6	▼1.2
CDU	Danko Jur	4,792	25.0	▲5.5	4,529	23.5	▲6.3
Left	✗ Margitta Mächtig	4,498	23.5	▼10.8	4,078	21.2	▼9.7
AfD	Tino Müller	1,867	9.7		1,929	10.0	
Greens	Axel Vogel	1,133	5.9	▲0.4	1,138	5.9	▲0.1
BVB/FW	Dr. Günther Spangenberg	671	3.5	▲1.2	295	1.5	▼0.1
FDP	Gregor Beyer	581	3.0	▼3.3	442	2.3	▼4.0
NPD					427	2.2	▼0.2
Pirates	Robert Klagge	246	1.3		243	1.3	
DKP					48	0.2	Steady
REP					44	0.2	Steady
Informal votes		469			379		
Total valid votes		19,160			19,250		
Turnout		19,629	41.7	▼18.4			
SPD gain from Left	Majority	580	3.0				

=== 2009 election ===
State election (2009): Barnim I
Notes:	Blue background denotes the winner of the electorate vote. Pink background denotes a candidate elected from their party list. Yellow background denotes an electorate win by a list member, or other incumbent. A ✓ or ✗ denotes status of any incumbent, win or lose respectively.						
Party	Candidate	Votes	%	±%	Party votes	%	±%
Left	✓ Margitta Mächtig	9,686	34.3	▼1.4	8,773	30.9	▼2.1
SPD	Daniel Kurth	7,712	27.3	▲3.3	9,306	32.8	▲0.4
CDU	Thomas Lunacek	5,496	19.5	▲2.0	4,879	17.2	▲1.8
FDP	Gregor Beyer	1,780	6.3	▲0.5	1,776	6.3	▲3.3
Greens	Elke Rosch	1,541	5.5	▼2.2	1,658	5.8	▲2.5
NPD	Thomas Gürtler	833	3.0		679	2.4	
BVB/FW	Günther Spangenberg	646	2.3		443	1.6	
DVU					339	1.2	▼3.6
50Plus	Johannes Madeja	509	1.8		260	0.9	▼1.2
RRP					126	0.4	
DKP					66	0.2	Steady
REP					48	0.2	
Die-Volksinitiative					30	0.1	
Informal votes		849			669		
Total valid votes		28,203			28,383		
Turnout		29,052	60.1	▲9.8			
Left hold	Majority	1,974	7.0	▼4.7			

=== 2004 election ===
State election (2004): Barnim I
Notes:	Blue background denotes the winner of the electorate vote. Pink background denotes a candidate elected from their party list. Yellow background denotes an electorate win by a list member, or other incumbent. A ✓ or ✗ denotes status of any incumbent, win or lose respectively.						
Party	Candidate	Votes	%	±%	Party votes	%	±%
PDS	Margitta Mächtig	8,545	35.66		7,978	33.01	
SPD	Peter Kikow	5,760	24.04		7,822	32.37	
CDU	Thomas Lunacek	4,188	17.48		3,712	15.36	
DVU					1,165	4.82	
Greens	Uta Leichsenring	1,835	7.66		808	3.34	
FDP	Barbara Ehm	1,382	5.77		736	3.05	
50Plus					507	2.10	
Familie					486	2.01	
AfW (Free Voters)	Johannes Madeja	1,038	4.33		261	1.08	
Schill	Tilo Weingardt	495	2.07		162	0.67	
BRB	Dieter Marx	444	1.85		151	0.62	
Independent	Tim Schumacher	277	1.16				
Gray Panthers					143	0.59	
AUB-Brandenburg					111	0.46	
Yes Brandenburg					84	0.35	
DKP					42	0.17	
Informal votes		647			443		
Total valid votes		23,964			24,168		
Turnout		24,611	50.33				
PDS win new seat	Majority	2,785	11.62				

== See also ==
- Politics of Brandenburg
- Landtag of Brandenburg
