= Uckermark II =

State electoral district of Germany

12: Uckermark II
- Electoral district for the Landtag of Brandenburg
- Uckermark II in 2024
- District: Uckermark
- Electorate: 33,986 (2024)
- Major settlements: Schwedt

Current electoral district
- Created: 1994
- Party: AfD
- Member: Norbert Rescher

Uckermark II is an electoral constituency (German: Wahlkreis) represented in the Landtag of Brandenburg. It elects one member via first-past-the-post voting. Under the constituency numbering system, it is designated as constituency 12. It is located in the Havelland district.

== Geography ==
The constituency includes the town Schwedt, as well as the community of Pinnow, and the administrative divisions of Gartz (Oder).

There were 33,986 eligible voters in 2024.

== Members ==
Election	Member	Party	%
2004	Mike Bischoff	SPD	36.4
2009	Mike Bischoff	SPD	44.4
2014	Mike Bischoff	SPD	55.4
2019	Mike Bischoff	SPD	40.1
2024	Norbert Rescher	AfD	39.7

== Election results ==
=== 2024 election ===
State election (2024): Uckermark II
Notes:	Blue background denotes the winner of the electorate vote. Pink background denotes a candidate elected from their party list. Yellow background denotes an electorate win by a list member, or other incumbent. A ✓ or ✗ denotes status of any incumbent, win or lose respectively.						
Party	Candidate	Votes	%	±%	Party votes	%	±%
AfD	Norbert Rescher	8,956	39.7	▲15.2	7,835	34.5	▲8.3
SPD	Michael Witt	7,950	35.2	▼4.9	6,894	30.4	▼3.2
BSW					3,669	16.2	
CDU	Börninck	2,755	12.2	▼1.1	2,224	9.8	▼4.4
BVB/FW	Knauthe	1,614	7.2	▲1.5	632	2.8	▼1.5
Left	Gedack	777	3.4	▼5.6	445	2.0	▼7.9
Tierschutzpartei					317	1.4	▼0.5
Greens	Triems	250	1.1	▼3.4	282	1.2	▼4.2
DLW					112	0.5	
FDP	Müller	189	0.8	▼2.1	112	0.5	▼2.8
Third Way	Denk	71	0.3		39	0.2	
Plus					103	0.5	▼0.6
Values					35	0.2	
DKP					12	0.1	
Informal votes		365			216		
Total valid votes		22,562			22,711		
Turnout		22,927	67.5	▲12.6			
AfD gain from SPD	Majority	1,006	4.5				

=== 2019 election ===
State election (2019): Uckermack II
Notes:	Blue background denotes the winner of the electorate vote. Pink background denotes a candidate elected from their party list. Yellow background denotes an electorate win by a list member, or other incumbent. A ✓ or ✗ denotes status of any incumbent, win or lose respectively.						
Party	Candidate	Votes	%	±%	Party votes	%	±%
SPD	✓ Mike Bischoff	7,718	40.1	▼15.3	6,471	33.6	▼9.1
AfD	Sebastian Schubert	4,715	24.5		5,039	26.2	▲15.2
CDU	Silke Nessing	2,553	13.3	▼4.1	2,739	14.2	▼4.3
Left	Heike Heise-Heiland	1,739	9.0	▼7.0	1,909	9.9	▼8.3
BVB/FW	Torsten Gärtner	1,083	5.6	▼0.5	830	4.3	▲3.0
Greens	Sven Uerkvitz	875	4.5	▼0.6	1,056	5.5	▲2.4
FDP	Sascha Lademann	564	2.9		633	3.3	▲1.7
Tierschutzpartei					364	1.9	
ÖDP					108	0.6	
Pirates					92	0.5	▼0.4
V-Partei3					27	0.1	
Informal votes		256			235		
Total valid votes		19,247			19,268		
Turnout		19,503	54.8	▲12.7			
SPD hold	Majority	3,003	15.6	▼22.4			

=== 2014 election ===
State election (2014): Uckermark II
Notes:	Blue background denotes the winner of the electorate vote. Pink background denotes a candidate elected from their party list. Yellow background denotes an electorate win by a list member, or other incumbent. A ✓ or ✗ denotes status of any incumbent, win or lose respectively.						
Party	Candidate	Votes	%	±%	Party votes	%	±%
SPD	✓ Mike Bischoff	8,485	55.4	▲11.0	6,597	42.7	▲4.2
CDU	Sandy Höppner	2,665	17.4	▲2.9	2,858	18.5	▲1.6
Left	Madlen Bismar	2,449	16.0	▼7.8	2,815	18.2	▼9.3
AfD					1,699	11.0	
BVB/FW	Torsten Gärtner	937	6.1	▲4.9	204	1.3	▲0.4
Greens	Bertram Webert	776	5.1	▲2.3	472	3.1	▲0.2
NPD					344	2.2	▼1.0
FDP					246	1.6	▼5.1
Pirates					139	0.9	
DKP					38	0.2	▲0.1
REP					27	0.2	Steady
Informal votes		359			232		
Total valid votes		15,312			15,439		
Turnout		15,671	42.1	▼20.6			
SPD hold	Majority	5,820	38.0	▲17.4			

=== 2009 election ===
State election (2009): Uckermark II
Notes:	Blue background denotes the winner of the electorate vote. Pink background denotes a candidate elected from their party list. Yellow background denotes an electorate win by a list member, or other incumbent. A ✓ or ✗ denotes status of any incumbent, win or lose respectively.						
Party	Candidate	Votes	%	±%	Party votes	%	±%
SPD	✓ Mike Bischoff	10,725	44.4	▲8.0	9,295	38.5	▲6.7
Left	Nadine Heckendorn	5,750	23.8	▼5.6	6,650	27.5	▼3.9
CDU	Wolfgang Banditt	3,498	14.5	▼3.3	4,084	16.9	▲0.9
FDP	Gerd Regler	1,845	7.6	▲2.5	1,631	6.7	▲2.9
NPD	Irmgard Hack	798	3.3		775	3.2	
Greens	Christiane Weitzel	680	2.8	▲0.3	694	2.9	▲1.3
50Plus	Wilfried Voß	557	2.3		416	1.7	▼2.1
BVB/FW	Rolf Zimmermann	283	1.2		228	0.9	
DVU					149	0.6	▼4.3
RRP					102	0.4	
Die-Volksinitiative					67	0.3	
REP					41	0.2	
DKP					35	0.1	▼0.2
Informal votes		660			629		
Total valid votes		24,136			24,167		
Turnout		24,796	62.7	▲8.4			
SPD hold	Majority	4,975	20.6	▲13.6			

=== 2004 election ===
State election (2004): Uckermark II
Notes:	Blue background denotes the winner of the electorate vote. Pink background denotes a candidate elected from their party list. Yellow background denotes an electorate win by a list member, or other incumbent. A ✓ or ✗ denotes status of any incumbent, win or lose respectively.						
Party	Candidate	Votes	%	±%	Party votes	%	±%
SPD	Mike Bischoff	8,055	36.35		7,103	31.79	
PDS	Thomas Groß	6,504	29.35		7,015	31.40	
CDU	Jens Koeppen	3,944	17.80		3,586	16.05	
DVU					1,094	4.90	
AfW (Free Voters)	Karola Bahr	1,593	7.19		363	1.62	
50Plus					846	3.79	
FDP	Ernst-Ulrich Sattelberg	1,126	5.08		840	3.76	
Familie					674	3.02	
Greens	Rotraut Gille	548	2.47		363	1.62	
BRB					108	0.48	
Gray Panthers					88	0.39	
Yes Brandenburg					77	0.34	
DKP					74	0.33	
Schill	Manfred Riese	389	1.76		59	0.26	
AUB-Brandenburg					53	0.24	
Informal votes		667			483		
Total valid votes		22,159			22,343		
Turnout		22,826	54.33				
SPD win new seat	Majority	1,551	7.00				

== See also ==
- Politics of Brandenburg
- Landtag of Brandenburg
