= Ostprignitz-Ruppin I =

State electoral district of Germany

3: Ostprignitz-Ruppin I
- Electoral district for the Landtag of Brandenburg
- Ostprignitz-Ruppin I in 2024
- District: Ostprignitz-Ruppin
- Electorate: 48,723 (2024)
- Major settlements: Neuruppin and Rheinsberg

Current electoral district
- Created: 1994
- Party: SPD
- Member: Ulrike Liedtke

Ostprignitz-Ruppin I is an electoral constituency (German: Wahlkreis) represented in the Landtag of Brandenburg. It elects one member via first-past-the-post voting. Under the constituency numbering system, it is designated as constituency 3. It is located in the Ostprignitz-Ruppin district.

== Geography ==
The constituency includes the towns of Neuruppin and Rheinsberg, as well as the community of Fehrbellin, and the administrative divisions of Lindow (Mark) and Temnitz.

There were 48,723 eligible voters in 2024.

== Members ==
Election	Member	Party	%
2004	Otto Theel	PDS	44.1
2009	Manfred Richter	SPD	27.6
2014	Ulrike Liedtke	SPD	36.3
2019	Ulrike Liedtke	SPD	23.6
2024	Ulrike Liedtke	SPD	34.6

== Election results ==
=== 2024 election ===
State election (2024): Ostprignitz-Ruppin I
Notes:	Blue background denotes the winner of the electorate vote. Pink background denotes a candidate elected from their party list. Yellow background denotes an electorate win by a list member, or other incumbent. A ✓ or ✗ denotes status of any incumbent, win or lose respectively.						
Party	Candidate	Votes	%	±%	Party votes	%	±%
SPD	Ulrike Liedtke	11,663	34.6	▲11.0	10,503	31.0	▲2.8
AfD	Henry Preuß	10,875	32.2	▲12.3	9,770	28.8	▲6.7
BSW					4,551	13.4	
CDU	Redmann	5,609	16.6	▼3.1	4,320	12.7	▼4.0
Left	Kretschmer	2,007	5.9	▼4.6	1,121	3.3	▼7.2
BVB/FW	Kamrath	1,998	5.9	▲1.2	968	2.9	▼0.9
Greens	Ahmed	726	2.2	▼14.4	1,293	3.8	▼8.2
DLW	Straßberger	506	1.5		251	0.7	
Tierschutzpartei					574	1.7	▼0.5
Plus					223	0.7	▼0.3
FDP	Pein	360	1.1	▼1.8	211	0.6	▼2.7
Values					61	0.2	
Third Way					35	0.1	
DKP					19	0.1	
Informal votes		443			287		
Total valid votes		33,744			33,900		
Turnout		34,187	70.2	▲14.2			
SPD hold	Majority	788	2.4	▼1.5			

=== 2019 election ===
State election (2019): Ostprignitz-Ruppin I
Notes:	Blue background denotes the winner of the electorate vote. Pink background denotes a candidate elected from their party list. Yellow background denotes an electorate win by a list member, or other incumbent. A ✓ or ✗ denotes status of any incumbent, win or lose respectively.						
Party	Candidate	Votes	%	±%	Party votes	%	±%
SPD	✓ Ulrike Liedtke	6,394	23.6	▼12.7	7,644	28.2	▼8.7
AfD	Gabriele Köhler	5,411	20.0	▲9.3	5,992	22.1	▲10.9
CDU	Sven Deter	5,347	19.7	▼0.8	4,536	16.7	▼5.0
Greens	Wolfganf Freese	4,486	16.5	▲11.4	3,253	12.0	▲6.0
Left	Ronny Kretschmer	2,862	10.6	▼11.0	2,837	10.5	▼6.9
BVB/FW	Siegfried Wittkopf	1,275	4.7	▲1.8	1,020	3.8	▲2.3
FDP	Dr. Garbiele Schare-Ruf	775	2.9	▲0.1	905	3.3	▲1.8
Die PARTEI	Corvin Drößler	364	1.3				
Tierschutzpartei					595	2.2	
Pirates	Dirk Harder	194	0.7	▲0.7	156	0.6	▼0.5
ÖDP					112	0.4	
V-Partei3					43	0.2	
Informal votes		351			366		
Total valid votes		27,108			27,093		
Turnout		27,459	56.0	▲13.6			
SPD hold	Majority	983	3.6	▼11.1			

=== 2014 election ===
State election (2014): Ostprignitz-Ruppin I
Notes:	Blue background denotes the winner of the electorate vote. Pink background denotes a candidate elected from their party list. Yellow background denotes an electorate win by a list member, or other incumbent. A ✓ or ✗ denotes status of any incumbent, win or lose respectively.						
Party	Candidate	Votes	%	±%	Party votes	%	±%
SPD	Ulrike Liedtke	7,484	36.3	▲8.7	7,634	36.9	▲0.1
Left	Gerd Klier	4,456	21.6	▼5.9	3,600	17.4	▼7.8
CDU	Michael Gayck	4,226	20.5	▲2.4	4,500	21.7	▲3.9
AfD	Michael Nehls	2,213	10.7		2,314	11.2	
Greens	Clemens Rostock	1,060	5.1	▼10.3	1,233	6.0	▲0.1
NPD					472	2.3	▲0.2
BVB/FW	Jürgen Ackermann	597	2.9	▼1.9	312	1.5	▼1.4
FDP	Martin Hesterberg	586	2.8	▼3.9	318	1.5	▼4.8
Pirates					237	1.1	
DKP					61	0.3	▲0.1
REP					26	0.1	▼0.1
Informal votes		417			332		
Total valid votes		20,622			20,707		
Turnout		21,039	42.4	▼19.5			
SPD hold	Majority	3,028	14.7	▲14.6			

=== 2009 election ===
State election (2009): Ostprignitz-Ruppin I
Notes:	Blue background denotes the winner of the electorate vote. Pink background denotes a candidate elected from their party list. Yellow background denotes an electorate win by a list member, or other incumbent. A ✓ or ✗ denotes status of any incumbent, win or lose respectively.						
Party	Candidate	Votes	%	±%	Party votes	%	±%
SPD	Manfred Richter	8,329	27.6	▲8.4	11,214	36.8	▲1.6
Left	Gerd Klier	8,293	27.5	▼16.6	7,686	25.2	▼2.5
CDU	Erich Kuhne	5,458	18.1	▼1.4	5,428	17.8	▲0.5
Greens	Wolfgang Freese	4,641	15.4	▲9.9	1,811	5.9	▲1.7
FDP	Bert Groche	2,033	6.7	▲1.5	1,936	6.3	▲2.9
BVB/FW	Sven Deter	1,450	4.8		879	2.9	
NPD					653	2.1	
DVU					365	1.2	▼4.5
RRP					171	0.6	
Die-Volksinitiative					150	0.5	
50Plus					112	0.4	▼0.3
REP					49	0.2	
DKP					48	0.2	▲0.1
Informal votes		1,212			914		
Total valid votes		30,204			30,502		
Turnout		31,416	61.9	▲10.0			
SPD gain from PDS	Majority	36	0.1				

=== 2004 election ===
State election (2004): Ostprignitz-Ruppin I
Notes:	Blue background denotes the winner of the electorate vote. Pink background denotes a candidate elected from their party list. Yellow background denotes an electorate win by a list member, or other incumbent. A ✓ or ✗ denotes status of any incumbent, win or lose respectively.						
Party	Candidate	Votes	%	±%	Party votes	%	±%
PDS	Otto Theel	11,195	44.06		7,108	27.69	
CDU	Erich Kuhne	4,949	19.48		7,108	27.69	
SPD	Wolfgang Klein	4,886	19.23		9,047	35.24	
DVU					1,459	5.68	
Greens	Roland Vogt	1,408	5.54		1,085	4.23	
FDP	Bernd Pelzer	1,310	5.16		876	3.41	
Familie					636	2.48	
The Grays – Gray Panthers					196	0.76	
AfW (Free Voters)	Klaus Nemitz	751	2.96		169	0.66	
50Plus					167	0.65	
BRB					113	0.44	
Schill	Carsten Blischke	439	1.73		111	0.43	
Yes Brandenburg	Lutz Meyer	468	1.84		159	0.62	
AUB-Brandenburg					71	0.28	
DKP					35	0.14	
Informal votes		907			641		
Total valid votes		25,406			25,672		
Turnout		26,313	51.86				
PDS win new seat	Majority	6,246	24.58				

== See also ==
- Politics of Brandenburg
- Landtag of Brandenburg
