= Havelland II (electoral district) =

State electoral district of Germany

6: Havelland II
- Electoral district for the Landtag of Brandenburg
- Havelland II in 2024
- District: Havelland
- Electorate: 53,351 (2024)
- Major settlements: Falkensee

Current electoral district
- Created: 1994
- Party: SPD
- Member: Julia Sahi

Havelland II is an electoral constituency (German: Wahlkreis) represented in the Landtag of Brandenburg. It elects one member via first-past-the-post voting. Under the constituency numbering system, it is designated as constituency 6. It is located in the Havelland district.

== Geography ==
The constituency includes the town of Falkensee, as well as the communities of Schönwalde-Glien and Dallgow-Döberitz.

There were 53,351 eligible voters in 2024.

== Members ==
Election	Member	Party	%
2004	Barbara Richstein	CDU	31.2
2009	Barbara Richstein	CDU	32.0
2014	Barbara Richstein	CDU	32.5
2019	Barbara Richstein	CDU	22.3
2024	Julia Sahi	SPD	37.1

== Election results ==
=== 2024 election ===
State election (2024): Havelland II
Notes:	Blue background denotes the winner of the electorate vote. Pink background denotes a candidate elected from their party list. Yellow background denotes an electorate win by a list member, or other incumbent. A ✓ or ✗ denotes status of any incumbent, win or lose respectively.						
Party	Candidate	Votes	%	±%	Party votes	%	±%
SPD	Julia Sahi	14,897	37.1	▲15.3	14,519	36.0	▲13.1
AfD	Heiko Prüwer	9,642	24.0	▲7.1	8,914	22.1	▲4.1
CDU	Kaeding	9,143	22.8	▲0.4	7,109	17.6	▼1.9
BSW					3,249	8.1	
Greens	Budke	2,466	6.1	▼15.1	2,980	7.4	▼12.7
Tierschutzpartei					874	2.2	▼1.2
BVB/FW	Frölich-Leitert	2,009	5.0	▲0.6	810	2.0	▼1.3
Left	Abel	1,341	3.3	▼3.2	833	2.1	▼4.0
FDP	Jabbour	679	1.7	▼2.4	473	1.2	▼3.9
Plus					302	0.7	▼0.7
DLW					132	0.3	
Values					101	0.3	
Third Way					35	0.1	
DKP					16	0.0	
Informal votes		394			224		
Total valid votes		40,177			40,347		
Turnout		40,571	76.0	▲8.4			
SPD gain from CDU	Majority	5,255	13.1				

=== 2019 election ===
State election (2019): Havelland II
Notes:	Blue background denotes the winner of the electorate vote. Pink background denotes a candidate elected from their party list. Yellow background denotes an electorate win by a list member, or other incumbent. A ✓ or ✗ denotes status of any incumbent, win or lose respectively.						
Party	Candidate	Votes	%	±%	Party votes	%	±%
CDU	✓ Barbara Richstein	7,714	22.3	▼10.2	6,737	19.5	▼8.5
SPD	Ines Jesse	7,526	21.8	▼5.8	7,902	22.8	▼4.5
Greens	Ursula Nonnemacher	7,321	21.2	▲7.5	6,943	20.1	▲6.5
AfD	Heiko Prüwer	5,839	16.9	▲3.9	6,208	18.0	▲4.4
Left	Jörg Schönberg	2,268	6.6	▼4.5	2,108	6.1	▼5.1
Tierschutzpartei					1,155	3.3	
BVB/FW	Knut Leitert	1,514	4.4	▲2.3	1,145	3.3	▲2.1
FDP	Amid Jabbour	1,427	4.1		1,765	5.1	▲3.2
Independent	Thomas Fuhl	927	2.7				
ÖDP					259	0.7	
Pirates					241	0.7	▼1.0
V-Partei3					99	0.3	
Informal votes		425			399		
Total valid votes		34,536			34,562		
Turnout		34,961	67.6	▲15.7			
CDU hold	Majority	188	0.5	▼4.4			

=== 2014 election ===
State election (2014): Havelland II
Notes:	Blue background denotes the winner of the electorate vote. Pink background denotes a candidate elected from their party list. Yellow background denotes an electorate win by a list member, or other incumbent. A ✓ or ✗ denotes status of any incumbent, win or lose respectively.						
Party	Candidate	Votes	%	±%	Party votes	%	±%
CDU	✓ Barbara Richstein	8,148	32.5	▲0.5	7,018	28.0	▲3.0
SPD	Alexander Lamprecht	6,916	27.6	▼3.0	6,869	27.4	▼5.1
Greens	Ursula Nonnemacher	3,426	13.7	▲2.4	3,425	13.6	▲2.5
AfD	Dr. Rainer van Raemdonck	3,255	13.0		3,412	13.6	
Left	Norbert Kunz	2,776	11.1	▼5.3	2,808	11.2	▼4.6
FDP					466	1.9	▼8.4
Pirates					425	1.7	
NPD					294	1.2	▼0.5
BVB/FW	Knut Leitert	518	2.1	▲1.2	291	1.2	Steady
REP					52	0.2	▼0.2
DKP					42	0.2	▲0.1
Informal votes		363			300		
Total valid votes		25,039			25,102		
Turnout		25,402	51.9	▼22.2			
CDU hold	Majority	1,232	4.9	▲3.5			

=== 2009 election ===
State election (2009): Havelland II
Notes:	Blue background denotes the winner of the electorate vote. Pink background denotes a candidate elected from their party list. Yellow background denotes an electorate win by a list member, or other incumbent. A ✓ or ✗ denotes status of any incumbent, win or lose respectively.						
Party	Candidate	Votes	%	±%	Party votes	%	±%
CDU	✓ Barbara Richstein	10,497	32.0	▲0.8	8,250	25.0	▼2.0
SPD	Rainer Speer	10,058	30.6	▲1.2	10,750	32.5	▲0.5
Left	Andrea Johlige	5,366	16.4	▼4.9	5,235	15.8	▼2.1
Greens	Ursula Nonnemacher	3,697	11.3	▲4.2	3,670	11.1	▲3.3
FDP	Olaf Karras	2,444	7.4	▲1.1	3,391	10.3	▲6.2
NPD					573	1.7	
Familie	Knut Leitert	452	1.4				
BVB/FW	Hans Link	304	0.9		388	1.2	
DVU					282	0.9	▼4.3
RRP					182	0.6	
50Plus					124	0.4	▼0.4
REP					123	0.4	
Die-Volksinitiative					61	0.2	
DKP					36	0.1	▼0.1
Informal votes		943			696		
Total valid votes		32,818			33,065		
Turnout		33,761	74.1	▲13.1			
CDU hold	Majority	439	1.4	▼0.4			

=== 2004 election ===
State election (2004): Havelland II
Notes:	Blue background denotes the winner of the electorate vote. Pink background denotes a candidate elected from their party list. Yellow background denotes an electorate win by a list member, or other incumbent. A ✓ or ✗ denotes status of any incumbent, win or lose respectively.						
Party	Candidate	Votes	%	±%	Party votes	%	±%
CDU	Barbara Richstein	7,672	31.22		6,690	27.04	
SPD	Heiko Müller	7,226	29.41		7,928	32.04	
PDS	Harald Petzold	5,226	21.27		4,429	17.90	
Greens	Dorothea Staiger	1,734	7,06		1,932	7.81	
DVU					1,276	5.16	
FDP	Echkardt Lindner	1,556	6.33		1,026	4.15	
Familie					463	1.87	
The Grays – Gray Panthers					283	1.14	
AfW (Free Voters)	Michael Richter-Kempin	744	3.03		140	0.57	
BRB	Knut Leitert	416	1.69		202	0.82	
50Plus					190	0.77	
AUB-Brandenburg					58	0.23	
Yes Brandenburg					47	0.19	
Schill					41	0.17	
DKP					39	0.16	
Informal votes		589			419		
Total valid votes		24,574			24,744		
Turnout		25,163	61.02				
CDU win new seat	Majority	446	1.81				

== See also ==
- Politics of Brandenburg
- Landtag of Brandenburg
