= Zyon Braun =

German politician (born 1994)

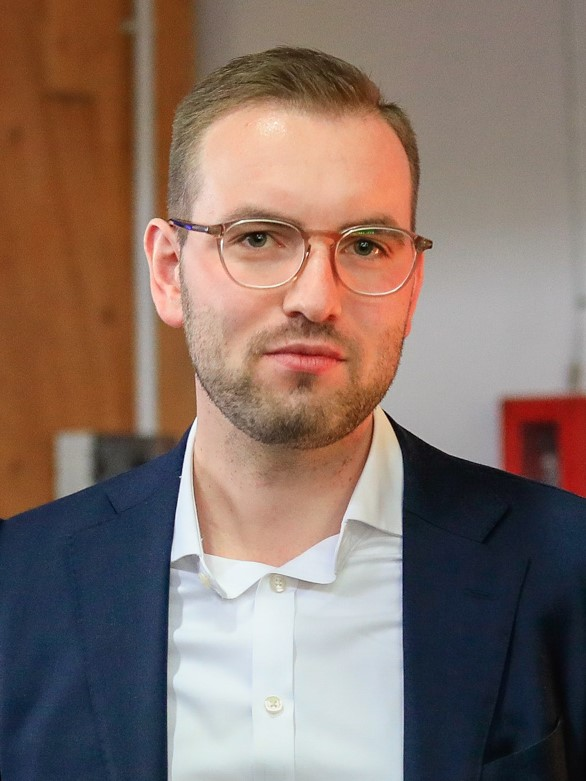
Zyon Braun in 2022

Zyon Matthias Braun (born 17 August 1994 in Templin) is a German politician from the Free Democratic Party. He has been the state chairman of his party in Brandenburg since December 2021 and a member of the FDP's federal executive board since April 2023.

== Education and career ==
In 2011, Braun began training as a bank teller at the Mittelbrandenburgischen Sparkasse in Potsdam. After his apprenticeship, Braun studied banking at the Frankfurt School of Finance & Management. He then began further studies in business administration at the FOM University of Applied Sciences. Since completing his training, he has worked in various positions at the Mittelbrandenburgische Sparkasse, most recently as a consultant in corporate planning and management.

== Political career ==
From 2016 onwards, Braun held various positions in the Brandenburg regional association of the Young Liberals. From 2016 to 2020, he was chairman of the largest district association in Brandenburg, the JuLis Potsdam. During the same period, he was also treasurer of the Young Liberals' regional board. In March 2020, he retired to a position as an assessor on the board before resigning completely in December 2021.

From April 2017 to 2019, Braun was an assessor on the state executive board of the FDP Brandenburg, after which he was elected as the party's state treasurer. He was elected as the state chairman of the FDP Brandenburg on 18 December 2021, with around 92 percent of the vote, succeeding Linda Teuteberg. On 25 March 2023 Braun was confirmed in office with 84.2 percent. The state executive board of the FDP Brandenburg nominated him on 4 June 2023, as the top candidate for the 2024 Brandenburg state election; on 21 October 2023 he was finally elected at a state party conference.

Since April 2023, he has been an assessor on the federal executive board of the FDP. In October 2023, he was chosen as the top candidate of the FDP Brandenburg for the 2024 state election. In the election, the FDP won no seats.
