= Oberhavel I =

State electoral district of Germany

7: Oberhavel I
- Electoral district for the Landtag of Brandenburg
- Oberhavel I in 2024
- District: Oberhavel
- Electorate: 55,089 (2024)
- Major settlements: Hennigsdorf, Kremmen, and Velten

Current electoral district
- Created: 1994
- Party: SPD
- Member: Andreas Noack

Oberhavel I is an electoral constituency (German: Wahlkreis) represented in the Landtag of Brandenburg. It elects one member via first-past-the-post voting. Under the constituency numbering system, it is designated as constituency 7. It is located in the Oberhavel district.

== Geography ==
The constituency includes the towns of Hennigsdorf, Kremmen, and Velten, as well as the communities of Löwenberger Land and Oberkrämer.

There were 55,089 eligible voters in 2024.

== Members ==
Election	Member	Party	%
2004	Thomas Günther	SPD	32.8
2009	Thomas Günther	SPD	34.6
2014	Thomas Günther	SPD	36.4
2019	Andreas Noack	SPD	29.1
2024	Andreas Noack	SPD	34.0

== Election results ==
=== 2024 election ===
State election (2024): Oberhavel I
Notes:	Blue background denotes the winner of the electorate vote. Pink background denotes a candidate elected from their party list. Yellow background denotes an electorate win by a list member, or other incumbent. A ✓ or ✗ denotes status of any incumbent, win or lose respectively.						
Party	Candidate	Votes	%	±%	Party votes	%	±%
SPD	✓ Andreas Noack	13,246	34.0	▲4.9	12,470	31.9	▲2.5
AfD	Heiko Gehring	12,677	32.6	▲8.1	11,714	30.0	▲6.1
CDU	Frank Bommert	6,191	15.9	▼0.2	5,104	13.1	▼1.9
BSW					4,417	11.3	
BVB/FW	Gebauer	3,346	8.6	▲1.7	1,168	3.0	▼1.1
Left	Wolf	1,362	3.5	▼5.2	835	2.1	▼6.4
Greens	Rostock	957	2.5	▼9.0	1,334	3.4	▼7.2
Tierschutzpartei					971	2.5	▼1.1
Plus	Preylowski	729	1.9		459	1.2	▼0.1
FDP	Gagern-Géronde	415	1.1	▼2.3	324	0.8	▼2.8
DLW					138	0.4	
Values					109	0.3	
Third Way					44	0.1	
DKP					20	0.1	
Informal votes		558			374		
Total valid votes		38,923			39,107		
Turnout		39,481	71.7	▲14.1			
SPD hold	Majority	569	1.4	▼3.3			

=== 2019 election ===
State election (2019): Oberhavel I
Notes:	Blue background denotes the winner of the electorate vote. Pink background denotes a candidate elected from their party list. Yellow background denotes an electorate win by a list member, or other incumbent. A ✓ or ✗ denotes status of any incumbent, win or lose respectively.						
Party	Candidate	Votes	%	±%	Party votes	%	±%
SPD	Andreas Noack	9,067	29.1	▼7.3	9,144	29.3	▼6.7
AfD	Dr. Dietmar Buchberger	7,605	24.4	▲12.6	7,423	23.8	▲10.2
CDU	Frank Bommert	4,997	16.1	▼6.8	4,651	14.9	▼6.6
Greens	Clemens Rostock	3,558	11.4	▲6.1	3,309	10.6	▲4.6
Left	Marco Pavlik	2,697	8.7	▼6.6	2,659	8.5	▼6.5
BVB/FW	Jürgen Kurth	2,149	6.9	▲2.8	1,280	4.1	▲1.8
Tierschutzpartei					1,131	3.6	
FDP	Ole Gawande	1,033	3.3	▲2.1	1,120	3.6	▲2.3
Pirates					235	0.8	▼0.6
ÖDP					157	0.5	
V-Partei3					58	0.2	
Informal votes		444			383		
Total valid votes		31,106			31,167		
Turnout		31,550	57.6	▲13.8			
SPD hold	Majority	1,462	4.7	▼8.8			

=== 2014 election ===
State election (2014): Oberhavel I
Notes:	Blue background denotes the winner of the electorate vote. Pink background denotes a candidate elected from their party list. Yellow background denotes an electorate win by a list member, or other incumbent. A ✓ or ✗ denotes status of any incumbent, win or lose respectively.						
Party	Candidate	Votes	%	±%	Party votes	%	±%
SPD	✓ Thomas Günther	8,446	36.4	▲2.0	8,361	36.0	▼1.9
CDU	Frank Bommert	5,303	22.9	▼0.8	4,982	21.5	▲1.4
Left	Ralf Wunderlich	3,559	15.3	▼8.1	3,487	15.0	▼6.0
AfD	Andreas Galau	2,742	11.8		3,157	13.6	
Greens	Thomas von Gizycki	1,236	5.3	▼0.6	1,401	6.0	▲0.3
BVB/FW	Jürgen Kurth	947	4.1	▲1.3	541	2.3	▲0.5
NPD	Thomas Schulz	669	2.9	▼0.3	594	2.6	Steady
Pirates					314	1.4	
FDP	Erik Naujoks	288	1.2	▼5.4	293	1.3	▼6.7
REP					48	0.2	▼0.1
DKP					45	0.2	▲0.1
Informal votes		406			373		
Total valid votes		23,190			23,223		
Turnout		23,596	43.8	▼22.3			
SPD hold	Majority	3,143	13.5	▲2.5			

=== 2009 election ===
State election (2009): Oberhavel I
Notes:	Blue background denotes the winner of the electorate vote. Pink background denotes a candidate elected from their party list. Yellow background denotes an electorate win by a list member, or other incumbent. A ✓ or ✗ denotes status of any incumbent, win or lose respectively.						
Party	Candidate	Votes	%	±%	Party votes	%	±%
SPD	✓ Thomas Günther	9,782	34.6	▲1.8	10,934	38.4	▲2.0
Left	Ursel Degner	6,665	23.6	▼4.4	5,971	21.0	▼2.2
CDU	Frank Bommert	6,628	23.5	▼0.2	5,650	19.9	▼0.2
FDP	Petra Cavusoglu	1,855	6.6	▲2.5	2,261	7.9	▲4.3
Greens	Heinz-Herwig Mascher	1,705	6.0	Steady	1,657	5.8	▲1.6
NPD	Christel Laske	826	2.9		699	2.5	
BVB/FW	Jürgen Kurth	788	2.8		505	1.8	
DVU					317	1.1	▼4.4
50Plus					147	0.5	▼1.0
RRP					123	0.4	
REP					77	0.3	
Die-Volksinitiative					76	0.3	
DKP					35	0.1	Steady
Informal votes		901			698		
Total valid votes		28,249			28,452		
Turnout		29,150	66.7	▲12.0			
SPD hold	Majority	3,117	11.0	▲6.2			

=== 2004 election ===
State election (2004): Oberhavel I
Notes:	Blue background denotes the winner of the electorate vote. Pink background denotes a candidate elected from their party list. Yellow background denotes an electorate win by a list member, or other incumbent. A ✓ or ✗ denotes status of any incumbent, win or lose respectively.						
Party	Candidate	Votes	%	±%	Party votes	%	±%
SPD	Thomas Günther	7,523	32.76		8,417	36.44	
PDS	Ursel Degner	6,437	28.03		5,362	23.22	
CDU	Wolfgang Krüger	5,441	23.69		4,644	20.11	
DVU					1,262	5.46	
Greens	Christoph Brunner	1,370	5.97		976	4.23	
FDP	Petra Cavusoglu	933	4.06		822	3.56	
Familie					431	1.87	
50Plus					339	1.47	
Gray Panthers					235	1.02	
AfW (Free Voters)	Diana Arjan	660	2.87		133	0.58	
Schill	Sabine Krahn	601	2.62		171	0.74	
BRB					122	0.53	
AUB-Brandenburg					88	0.38	
Yes Brandenburg					61	0.26	
DKP					34	0.15	
Informal votes		544			412		
Total valid votes		22,965			23,097		
Turnout		23,509	54.73				
SPD win new seat	Majority	1,086	4.73				

== See also ==
- Politics of Brandenburg
- Landtag of Brandenburg
