= Kurt Fischer (politician, born 2000) =

German politician (born 2000)

Member of the Landtag of Brandenburg
- Incumbent
- Assumed office 17 October 2024

Personal details
- Born: 2000 (age 25–26) Eberswalde
- Party: Social Democratic Party (since 2016)

Kurt Fischer (born 2000 in Eberswalde) is a German politician serving as a member of the Landtag of Brandenburg since 2024. He has served as secretary general of the Social Democratic Party in Brandenburg since 2024.
