= Julian Brüning =

German politician (born 1994)

Member of the Landtag of Brandenburg
- Incumbent
- Assumed office 25 September 2019

Personal details
- Born: 16 July 1994 (age 31)
- Party: Christian Democratic Union (since 2013)

Julian Brüning (born 16 July 1994) is a German politician serving as a member of the Landtag of Brandenburg since 2019. From 2015 to 2023, he served as chairman of the Young Union in Brandenburg.
