= Dominik Kaufner =

German politician (born 1983)

Member of the Landtag of Brandenburg
- Incumbent
- Assumed office 17 October 2024

Personal details
- Born: 1983 (age 42–43) Mainburg
- Party: Alternative for Germany (since 2013)

Dominik Alexander Kaufner (born 1983 in Mainburg) is a German politician serving as a member of the Landtag of Brandenburg since 2024. He has served as chairman of the Alternative for Germany in Havelland since 2020.
