= Deutsch Land Wirtschaft =

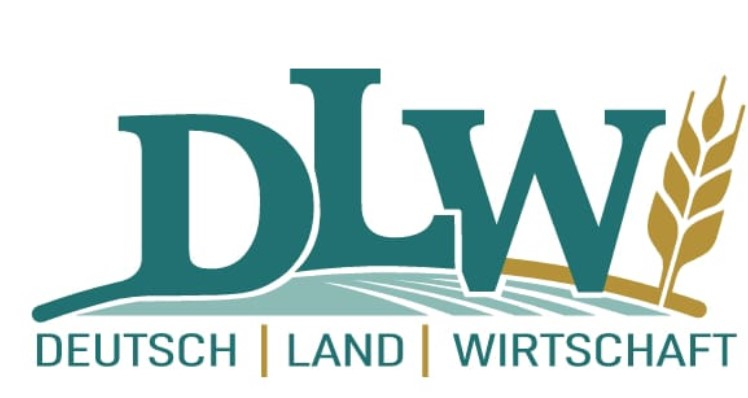
- Abbreviation: DLW
- Leader: Benjamin Meise
- Founded: June 2024; 2 years ago
- Headquarters: Buchholzer Dorfstraße 23, 15518 Steinhöfel
- Membership (2024): 15–20
- Ideology: Farmers' interests Agrarianism
- Political position: Centre
- Colors: Dark turquoise
- Slogan: Stimme für's Land!

Website
- dlw-partei.de

Deutsch Land Wirtschaft (lit. 'German-Land-Economy'; DLW) is a minor political party in Germany based in the state of Brandenburg. The party was founded ahead of the 2024 Brandenburg state election and seeks to represent the interests of farmers in German politics.

== History ==
The party was preceded by the registered association Land schafft Verbindung Brandenburg e. V., which was formed as part of the 2023–2024 German farmers' protests. The DLW itself was founded in June 2024 by members of this association in Steinhöfel and elected Benjamin Meise as its leader.

The DLW registered for the 2024 Brandenburg state election the same month as its foundation and was able to gain the 2,000 signatures required to run. While it initially aimed to run candidates in all 44 constituencies, it only stood in 6, with all of the candidates also being present on the party list. During the election, the party received 6,619 votes or 0.44% was thus fell short of the 5%-threshold to enter the Landtag. Despite declaring its ambitions, the party did not run in the 2025 German federal election.

== Organisation ==
Benjamin Meise is the DLW's leader since its foundation; the vice-chairman and leader of the state branch in Brandenburg is Thomas Essig. As of 2024, the party has between 15 and 20 members.

As of 2025, the party has one state branch in Brandenburg, although it hopes to expand to the rest of Germany in the future. Local or district branches must consist of at least 3 members to be founded.

== Program ==
The primary focus of the DLW is to represent the interest of farmers and rural communities in Germany. It focus lies primarily on the re-introduction of tax breaks on agricultural diesel and the reduction of bureaucracy with a special focus on smaller agricultural business. The DLW also wants to focus on rural development, wishing to aid local culture, mobility, and supply. Its concept of regenerative agriculture proposes a system in with both conventional and ecological agriculture can coexist.

Although supportive of qualified migration, the DLW is critical of mass and irregular migration as well as what it views as abuses of Germany's social safety nets. The DLW also supports the extension of direct democracy through referendums. The party views itself in the centre and distances itself from both the far-left and the far-right. It opposes armament shipments to Ukraine during the Russian invasion of Ukraine and is critical of the mainstream narrative on the war.

== Election results ==
=== State elections ===
Year	BB				
Year	Party list		Constituency		Seats
Year	Votes	%	Votes	%	Seats
2024	6,619	0.44	4,536	0.30	0

== See also ==
- 2023–2024 German farmers' protests
- Democratic Farmers' Party of Germany
