= Politics of Brandenburg =

Overview of the politics of Brandenburg

The politics of Brandenburg takes place within a framework of a federal parliamentary representative democratic republic, where the Federal Government of Germany exercises sovereign rights with certain powers reserved to the states of Germany including Brandenburg. The four main parties are the centre-left Social Democratic Party of Germany (SPD), the far-right Alternative for Germany (AfD), the populist left Sahra Wagenknecht Alliance (BSW), and the centre-right Christian Democratic Union.

Every five years, all Germans residing in the state over the age of 18 elect the members of the Landtag of Brandenburg. This regional parliament or legislature then elects the minister-president and confirms the cabinet members.

The Social Democratic Party of Germany (SPD) has been the biggest party in every election since 1990 Brandenburg state election.

== List of minister-presidents of Brandenburg ==
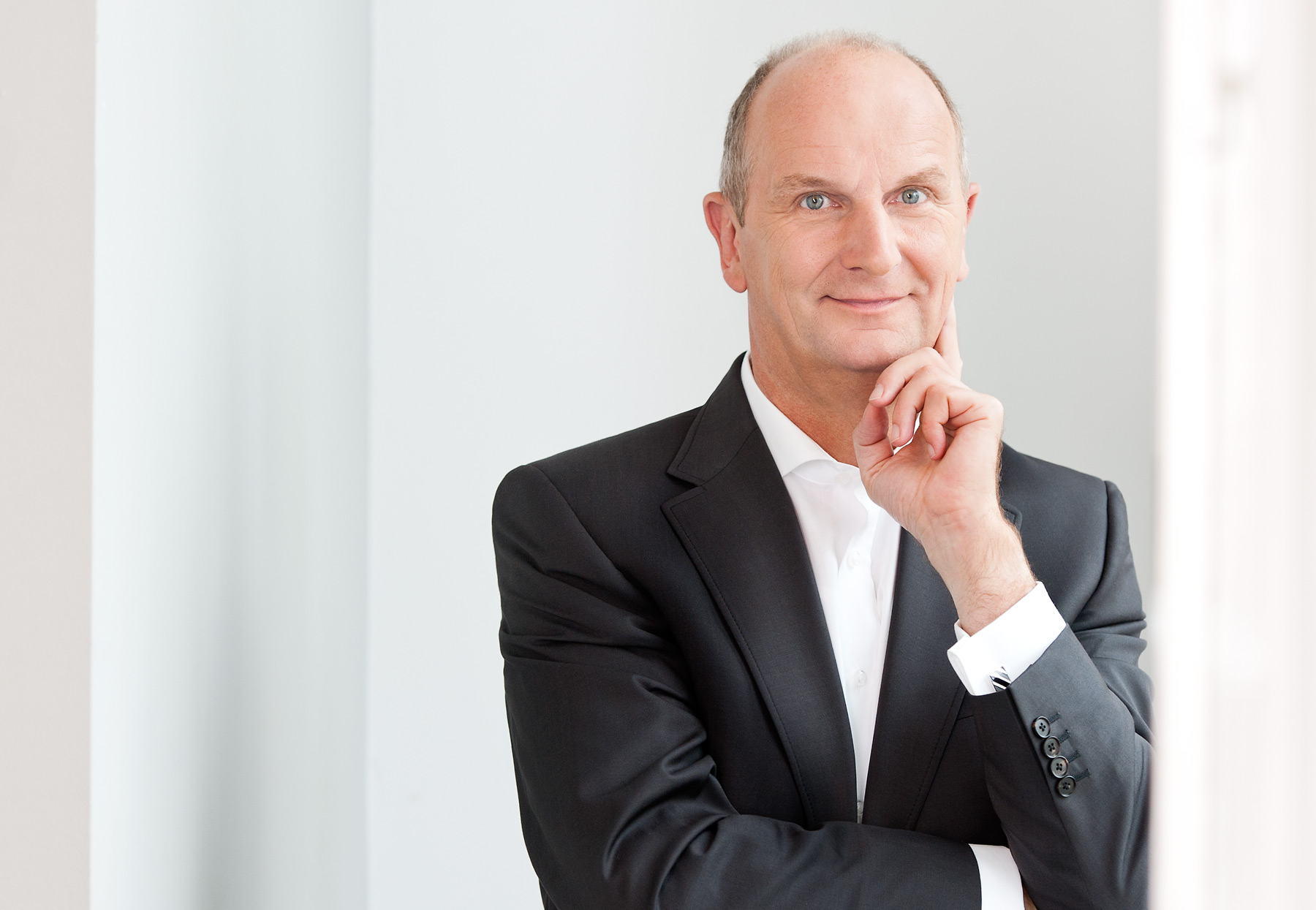
Dietmar Woidke, incumbent minister-president

1. 1947 - 1949: Karl Steinhoff (SED, formerly SPD)
2. 1949 - 1952: Rudolf Jahn (SED)
3. 1990 - 2002: Manfred Stolpe (SPD)
4. 2002 - 2013: Matthias Platzeck (SPD)
5. Since 2013: Dietmar Woidke (SPD)

== Landtag of Brandenburg ==
=== Party strength in the Landtag ===
Election year	Total seats	Seats won									
Election year	Total seats	SPD	CDU	PDS	FDP	Grüne	DVU	Linke	BVB/FW	AfD	BSW
1990	88	36	27	13	6	6					
1994	88	52	18	18							
1999	89	37	25	22			5				
2004	88	33	20	29			6				
2009	88	31	19		7	5		26			
2014	88	30	21			6		17	3	11	
2019	88	25	15			10		10	5	23	
2024	88	32	12							30	14

=== Legislative compositions ===
1990 Brandenburg state election

1994 Brandenburg state election

1999 Brandenburg state election

2004 Brandenburg state election

2009 Brandenburg state election

2014 Brandenburg state election

2019 Brandenburg state election

2024 Brandenburg state election

=== State election results maps ===
1990 Brandenburg state election

1994 Brandenburg state election

1999 Brandenburg state election

2004 Brandenburg state election

2009 Brandenburg state election

2014 Brandenburg state election

2019 Brandenburg state election

2024 Brandenburg state election

=== Constituencies in the Landtag ===
No	Constituency	Member	2024	2019	2014	2009	2004	1999	1994
1	Prignitz I	Jean-René Adam	AfD	SPD	SPD	SPD	SPD	PDS	PDS
2	Prignitz II/Ostprignitz-Ruppin II	Torsten Arndt	AfD	SPD	SPD	Left	PDS	SPD	SPD
3	Ostprignitz-Ruppin I	Ulrike Liedtke	SPD	SPD	SPD	SPD	PDS		
4	Ostprignitz-Ruppin III/Havelland II	Kai Berger	AfD	SPD	Left	Left	PDS		
5	Havelland I	Johnannes Funke	SPD	SPD	SPD	SPD	SPD		
6	Havelland II	Julia Sahi	SPD	CDU	CDU	CDU	CDU		
7	Oberhavel I	Andreas Noack	SPD	SPD	SPD	SPD	SPD		
8	Oberhavel II	Benjamin Grimm	SPD	SPD	SPD	SPD	SPD		
9	Oberhavel III	Tim Zimmermann	AfD	SPD	SPD	Left	PDS		
10	Uckermark III/Oberhavel IV	Andreas Galau	AfD	AfD	CDU	Left	PDS		
11	Uckermark I	Felix Teichner	AfD	AfD	SPD	SPD	PDS		
12	Uckermark II	Norbert Rescher	AfD	SPD	SPD	SPD	SPD		
13	Barnim I	Roman Kuffert	AfD	SPD	SPD	Left	PDS		
14	Barnim II	Steffen John	AfD	BVB/FW	SPD	Left	PDS		
15	Barnim III	Lena Kotré	AfD	AfD	SPD	Left	PDS		
16	Brandenburg an der Havel I/Potsdam-Mittelmark I	Udo Wernitz	SPD	SPD	SPD	SPD	SPD		
17	Brandenburg an der Havel II	Brita Kornmesser	SPD	SPD	SPD	SPD	SPD		
18	Potsdam-Mittelmark II	Melanie Balzer	SPD	SPD	SPD	SPD	SPD		
19	Potsdam-Mittelmark III/Potsdam III	Uwe Adler	SPD	SPD	CDU	CDU	CDU		
20	Potsdam-Mittelmark IV	Sebastian Rüter	SPD	SPD	SPD	SPD	SPD		
21	Potsdam I	Manja Schüle	SPD	Grüne	SPD	SPD	SPD		
22	Potsdam II	Daniel Keller	SPD	SPD	Left	Left	SPD		
23	Teltow-Fläming I	Marcel Penquitt	SPD	SPD	SPD	SPD	SPD		
24	Teltow-Fläming II	Erik Stohn	SPD	SPD	SPD	Left	PDS		
25	Teltow-Fläming III	Ines Seiler	SPD	SPD	BVB/FW	SPD	SPD		
26	Dahme-Spreewald I	Tina Fischer	SPD	SPD	SPD	SPD	SPD		
27	Dahme-Spreewald II/Oder-Spree I	Ludwig Scheetz	SPD	SPD	SPD	Left	PDS		
28	Dahme-Spreewald III	Hans-Christoph Berndt	AfD	AfD	SPD	SPD	PDS		
29	Oder-Spree II	Dennis Hohloch	AfD	AfD	CDU	Left	PDS		
30	Oder-Spree III	Kathleen Muxel	AfD	AfD	SPD	Left	PDS		
31	Märkisch-Oderland I/Oder-Spree IV	Jörg Vogelsänger	SPD	SPD	SPD	Left	PDS		
32	Märkisch-Oderland II	Erik Pardeik	AfD	SPD	Left	Left	PDS		
33	Märkisch-Oderland III	Lars Günther	AfD	AfD	SPD	Left	PDS		
34	Märkisch-Oderland IV	Falk Janke	AfD	AfD	SPD	Left	PDS		
35	Frankfurt (Oder)	Wilko Möller	AfD	AfD	Left	Left	PDS		
36	Elbe-Elster I	Peter Drenske	AfD	AfD	CDU	Left	PDS		
37	Elbe-Elster II	Volker Nothing	AfD	AfD	CDU	CDU	CDU		
38	Oberspreewald-Lausitz I	Birgit Bessin	AfD	CDU	CDU	CDU	CDU		
39	Oberspreewald-Lausitz II/Spree-Neiße IV	Fabian Jank	AfD	SPD	SPD	Left	PDS		
40	Oberspreewald-Lausitz III/Spree-Neiße III	Daniel Münschke	AfD	AfD	CDU	SPD	SPD		
41	Spree-Neiße I	Steffen Kubitzki	AfD	SPD	SPD	SPD	PDS		
42	Spree-Neiße II	Michael Hanko	AfD	AfD	CDU	Left	PDS		
43	Cottbus I	Jean-Pascal Hohm	AfD	AfD	CDU	SPD	SPD		
44	Cottbus II	Lars Katzmarek	SPD	AfD	SPD	Left	SPD		

== Constituencies in the Bundestag ==
No	Constituency	Member	2021	Voters	2017	2013	2009	2005	2002	1998	1994	1990
56	Prignitz – Ostprignitz-Ruppin – Havelland I	Wiebke Papenbrock	SPD	172,726	CDU	CDU	SPD	SPD	SPD	SPD	SPD	CDU
57	Uckermark – Barnim I	Stefan Zierke	SPD	182,836	CDU	CDU	Left	SPD	SPD	SPD	SPD	SPD
58	Oberhavel – Havelland II	Ariane Fäscher	SPD	249,331	CDU	CDU	SPD	SPD	SPD	SPD	SPD	SPD
59	Märkisch-Oderland – Barnim II	Simona Koß	SPD	230,391	CDU	CDU	Left	SPD	SPD	Created for 2002 election		
60	Brandenburg an der Havel – Potsdam-Mittelmark I – Havelland III – Teltow-Fläming I	Sonja Eichwede	SPD	202,955	CDU	SPD	SPD	SPD	SPD	SPD	SPD	SPD
61	Potsdam – Potsdam-Mittelmark II – Teltow-Fläming II	Olaf Scholz	SPD	232,797	SPD	CDU	SPD	SPD	SPD	SPD	SPD	SPD
62	Dahme-Spreewald – Teltow-Fläming III	Wiebke Papenbrock	SPD	252,744	CDU	CDU	SPD	SPD	SPD	Created for 2002 election		
63	Frankfurt (Oder) – Oder-Spree	Mathias Papendieck	SPD	191,387	CDU	CDU	Left	SPD	SPD	SPD	SPD	CDU
64	Cottbus – Spree-Neiße	Maja Wallstein	SPD	171,267	CDU	CDU	Left	SPD	SPD	SPD	SPD	CDU
65	Elbe-Elster – Oberspreewald-Lausitz	Hannes Walter	SPD	162,410	CDU	CDU	CDU	SPD	SPD	Created for 2002 election		

=== Bundestag election results ===
Election year	% won	% won								
Election year	% won	CDU	SPD	PDS	FDP	Grüne	NDP	Linke	AfD	BSW
1990	100	36.3	32.9	11.0	9.7	6.6				
1994	100	28.1	45.1	19.3	2.6	2.9				
1998	100	20.7	43.9	20.0	2.8	3.4				
2002	100	22.3	46.4	17.2	5.8	4.5				
2005	100	20.6	35.8		6.9	5.1	3.2	26.6		
2009	100	23.6	25.1		9.3	6.1		28.5		
2013	100	34.8	23.1		2.5	4.7		22.4	6.0	
2017	100	26.7	17.6		7.1	5.0		17.2	20.2	
2021	100	15.3	29.5		9.3	9.0		8.5	18.1	
2025	100	18.1	14.8		3.2	6.6		10.7	32.5	10.7

== See also ==
- Landtag of Brandenburg
- List of electoral districts in the Landtag of Brandenburg
- 1990 Brandenburg state election
- 1994 Brandenburg state election
- 1999 Brandenburg state election
- 2004 Brandenburg state election
- 2009 Brandenburg state election
- 2014 Brandenburg state election
- 2019 Brandenburg state election
- 2024 Brandenburg state election
- New states of Germany
- Politics of East Germany
