= Prignitz I (electoral district) =

State electoral district of Germany

1: Prignitz I
- Electoral district for the Landtag of Brandenburg
- Prignitz I in 2024
- District: Prignitz
- Electorate: 42,083 (2024)
- Major settlements: Perleberg and Wittenberge

Current electoral district
- Created: 1994
- Party: AfD
- Member: Jean-René Adam

Prignitz I is an electoral constituency (German: Wahlkreis) represented in the Landtag of Brandenburg. It elects one member via first-past-the-post voting. Under the constituency numbering system, it is designated as constituency 1. It is located in the Prignitz district

== Geography ==
The constituency includes the towns of Wittenberge and Perleberg, as well as the communities of Plattenburg, Karstädt, Gumtow, and the administrative divisions of Bad Wilsnack/Weisen and Lenzen-Elbtalaue.

There were 42,083 eligible voters in 2024.

== Members ==
| Election | Member | Party | % |
|---|---|---|---|
| 1994 | Christel Fiebiger | PDS | |
| 1999 | Thomas Domres | PDS | |
| 2004 | Thomas Domres | PDS | |
| 2004 | Dagmar Ziegler | SPD | |
| 2009 | Rupprecht Holger | SPD | |
| 2014 | Rupprecht Holger | SPD | 35.0 |
| 2019 | Harald Phole | SPD | 26.6 |
| 2024 | Jean-René Adam | AfD | 34.5 |

== Election results ==
=== 2024 election ===
State election (2024): Prignitz I
| Notes: | Blue background denotes the winner of the electorate vote. Pink background denotes a candidate elected from their party list. Yellow background denotes an electorate win by a list member, or other incumbent. A ✓ or ✗ denotes status of any incumbent, win or lose respectively. | | | | | | |
| Party | Candidate | Votes | % | ±% | Party votes | % | ±% |
|---|---|---|---|---|---|---|---|
| AfD | Jean-Rene Adam | 9,860 | 34.5 | ▲13.8 | 9,308 | 32.4 | ▲9.8 |
| SPD | Neubecker | 9,335 | 32.6 | ▲6.1 | 8,917 | 31.0 | ▼0.5 |
| CDU | Gordon Hoffmann | 5,222 | 18.3 | ▼3.7 | 3,808 | 13.2 | ▼4.9 |
| BSW | | | | | 3,712 | 12.9 | |
| Left | Domres | 1,921 | 6.7 | ▼7.3 | 899 | 3.1 | ▼6.9 |
| BVB/FW | Britz | 1,497 | 5.2 | ▼2.0 | 667 | 2.3 | ▼2.2 |
| Greens | Schäffer | 368 | 1.3 | ▼5.2 | 555 | 1.9 | ▼5.0 |
| Tierschutzpartei | | | | | 382 | 1.3 | ▼0.7 |
| Third Way | Schulz | 220 | 0.8 | | 103 | 0.4 | |
| Plus | | | | | 128 | 0.4 | ▼0.4 |
| DLW | | | | | 117 | 0.4 | |
| FDP | Kretschmer | 190 | 0.7 | ▼2.4 | 114 | 0.4 | ▼3.0 |
| Values | | | | | 35 | 0.1 | |
| DKP | | | | | 7 | 0.0 | |
| Informal votes | | 453 | | | 314 | | |
| Total valid votes | | 28,613 | | | 28,752 | | |
| Turnout | | 29,066 | 69.1 | ▲10.7 | | | |
| AfD gain from SPD | Majority | 525 | 1.9 | | | | |

=== 2019 election ===
State election (2019): Prignitz I
| Notes: | Blue background denotes the winner of the electorate vote. Pink background denotes a candidate elected from their party list. Yellow background denotes an electorate win by a list member, or other incumbent. A ✓ or ✗ denotes status of any incumbent, win or lose respectively. | | | | | | |
| Party | Candidate | Votes | % | ±% | Party votes | % | ±% |
|---|---|---|---|---|---|---|---|
| SPD | Harald Pohle | 6,695 | 26.6 | ▼8.4 | 7,960 | 31.5 | ▼7.7 |
| CDU | Gordon Hoffmann | 5,536 | 22.0 | ▼5.3 | 4,596 | 18.2 | ▼6.8 |
| AfD | Marko Oliver Czajkowski | 5,203 | 20.7 | ▲12.7 | 5,693 | 22.5 | ▲13.7 |
| Left | Thomas Domres | 3,523 | 14.0 | ▼9.4 | 2,521 | 10.0 | ▼8.4 |
| BVB/FW | Malk Tesch | 1,832 | 7.3 | ▲5.9 | 1,142 | 4.5 | ▲3.5 |
| Greens | Rainer Schneewolf | 1,633 | 6.5 | ▲2.9 | 1,741 | 6.9 | ▲3.3 |
| FDP | Michael Hintz | 774 | 3.1 | ▲1.7 | 848 | 3.4 | ▲2.2 |
| APT | | | | | 504 | 2.0 | |
| Pirates | | | | | 137 | 0.5 | ▼0.3 |
| ÖDP | | | | | 84 | 0.3 | |
| V-Partei3 | | | | | 35 | 0.1 | |
| Informal votes | | 436 | | | 371 | | |
| Total valid votes | | 25,196 | | | 25,261 | | |
| Turnout | | 25,632 | 58.4 | ▲15.4 | | | |
| SPD hold | Majority | 1,159 | 4.6 | ▼3.1 | | | |

=== 2014 election ===
State election (2024): Prignitz I
| Notes: | Blue background denotes the winner of the electorate vote. Pink background denotes a candidate elected from their party list. Yellow background denotes an electorate win by a list member, or other incumbent. A ✓ or ✗ denotes status of any incumbent, win or lose respectively. | | | | | | |
| Party | Candidate | Votes | % | ±% | Party votes | % | ±% |
|---|---|---|---|---|---|---|---|
| SPD | ✓ Rupprecht Holger | 6,848 | 35.0 | ▲1.0 | 7,675 | 39.2 | ▲0.5 |
| CDU | Gordon Hoffmann | 5,340 | 27.3 | ▲4.7 | 4,908 | 25.0 | ▲4.4 |
| Left | Thomas Domres | 4,575 | 23.4 | ▼6.3 | 3,598 | 18.4 | ▼7.7 |
| AfD | Thomas Mario Schlaffke | 1,566 | 8.0 | | 1,727 | 8.8 | |
| Greens | Frank Heinke | 703 | 3.6 | ▲0.1 | 712 | 3.6 | ▲0.5 |
| NPD | | | | | 340 | 1.7 | ▼0.7 |
| BVB/FW | Jörg Arnold | 278 | 1.4 | ▲0.1 | 199 | 1.0 | ▲0.2 |
| FDP | Andreas F. Schulz | 273 | 1.4 | ▼4.6 | 241 | 1.2 | ▼5.0 |
| Pirates | | | | | 154 | 0.8 | |
| REP | | | | | 29 | 0.1 | Steady |
| DKP | | | | | 21 | 0.1 | Steady |
| Informal votes | | 283 | | | 262 | | |
| Total valid votes | | 19,583 | | | 19,604 | | |
| Turnout | | 19,866 | 43.0 | ▼21.9 | | | |
| SPD hold | Majority | 1,508 | 7.7 | ▲3.4 | | | |

=== 2009 election ===
State election (2009): Prignitz I
| Notes: | Blue background denotes the winner of the electorate vote. Pink background denotes a candidate elected from their party list. Yellow background denotes an electorate win by a list member, or other incumbent. A ✓ or ✗ denotes status of any incumbent, win or lose respectively. | | | | | | |
| Party | Candidate | Votes | % | ±% | Party votes | % | ±% |
|---|---|---|---|---|---|---|---|
| SPD | Holger Rupprecht | 10,454 | 34.0 | ▼3.4 | 11,979 | 38.7 | ▼1.0 |
| Left | Thomas Domres | 9,120 | 29.7 | ▲1.8 | 8,103 | 26.1 | ▲1.9 |
| CDU | Gordon Hoffmann | 6,952 | 22.6 | ▲0.2 | 6,385 | 20.6 | ▲0.5 |
| FDP | Andreas F. Schulz | 1,840 | 6.0 | ▲2.9 | 1,929 | 6.2 | ▲3.5 |
| Greens | Bärbel Treutler | 1,081 | 3.5 | ▲1.9 | 962 | 3.1 | ▲1.6 |
| NPD | Peter Börs | 870 | 2.8 | | 750 | 2.4 | |
| DVU | | | | | 317 | 1.0 | ▼4.9 |
| BVB/FW | Christian Stein | 385 | 1.3 | | 259 | 0.8 | |
| RRP | | | | | 129 | 0.4 | |
| 50Plus | | | | | 71 | 0.2 | ▼0.2 |
| REP | | | | | 46 | 0.1 | |
| Die-Volksinitiative | | | | | 38 | 0.1 | |
| DKP | | | | | 22 | 0.1 | Steady |
| Informal votes | | 1,108 | | | 820 | | |
| Total valid votes | | 30,702 | | | 20,990 | | |
| Turnout | | 31,810 | 64.9 | ▲7.7 | | | |
| SPD hold | Majority | 1,334 | 4.3 | ▼5.2 | | | |

=== 2004 election ===
State election (2004): Prignitz I
| Notes: | Blue background denotes the winner of the electorate vote. Pink background denotes a candidate elected from their party list. Yellow background denotes an electorate win by a list member, or other incumbent. A ✓ or ✗ denotes status of any incumbent, win or lose respectively. | | | | | | |
| Party | Candidate | Votes | % | ±% | Party votes | % | ±% |
|---|---|---|---|---|---|---|---|
| SPD | Dagmar Ziegler | 10,600 | 37.38 | | 11,336 | 39.67 | |
| PDS | Thomas Domres | 7,921 | 27.93 | | 6,919 | 24.21 | |
| CDU | Rainer Neumann | 6,349 | 22.39 | | 5,741 | 20.09 | |
| DVU | | | | | 1,678 | 5.87 | |
| AUB-Brandenburg | Steffen Bethke | 1,586 | 5.59 | | 641 | 2.24 | |
| FDP | Manfred Prietzel | 874 | 3.08 | | 774 | 2.71 | |
| Yes Brandenburg | Mario Schulz | 567 | 2.00 | | 127 | 0.44 | |
| Greens | Helmut Adamaschek | 464 | 1.64 | | 429 | 1.50 | |
| Familie | | | | | 563 | 1.97 | |
| 50Plus | | | | | 116 | 0.41 | |
| The Grays – Gray Panthers | | | | | 106 | 0.37 | |
| BRB | | | | | 70 | 0.24 | |
| Schill | | | | | 27 | 0.09 | |
| AfW (Free Voters) | | | | | 26 | 0.09 | |
| DKP | | | | | 23 | 0.08 | |
| Informal votes | | 830 | | | 615 | | |
| Total valid votes | | 28,361 | | | 28,576 | | |
| Turnout | | 29,191 | 57.16 | | | | |
| SPD win new seat | Majority | 2,679 | 9.45 | | | | |

== See also ==
- Politics of Brandenburg
- Landtag of Brandenburg
