= Elbe-Elster II =

State electoral district of Germany

37: Elbe-Elster II
- Electoral district for the Landtag of Brandenburg
- Elbe-Elster II in 2024
- District: Elbe-Elster
- Electorate: 39,869 (2024)
- Major settlements: Bad Liebenwerda, Doberlug-Kirchhain, Elsterwerda, and Mühlberg/Elbe

Current electoral district
- Created: 1994
- Party: AfD
- Member: Volker Nothing

Elbe-Elster II is an electoral constituency (German: Wahlkreis) represented in the Landtag of Brandenburg. It elects one member via first-past-the-post voting. Under the constituency numbering system, it is designated as constituency 37. It is located in within the district of Elbe-Elster.

== Geography ==
The constituency includes the towns of Bad Liebenwerda, Doberlug-Kirchhain, Elsterwerda, and Mühlberg/Elbe, the municipality of Röderland, and the districts of Elsterland, Plessa, and Schradenland.

There were 39,869 eligible voters in 2024.

== Members ==
Election	Member	Party	%
2004	Frank Werner	CDU	30.0
2009	Anja Heinrich	CDU	29.4
2014	Anja Heinrich	CDU	40.0
2019	Volker Nothing	AfD	30.2
2024	Volker Nothing	AfD	43.5

== Election results ==
=== 2024 election ===
State election (2024): Elbe-Elster II
Notes:	Blue background denotes the winner of the electorate vote. Pink background denotes a candidate elected from their party list. Yellow background denotes an electorate win by a list member, or other incumbent. A ✓ or ✗ denotes status of any incumbent, win or lose respectively.						
Party	Candidate	Votes	%	±%	Party votes	%	±%
AfD	✓ Volker Nothing	12,516	43.5	▲13.3	11,359	39.3	▲7.5
SPD	Fabian Blöchl	7,824	27.2	▲8.5	7,367	25.5	▲2.2
BSW					4,163	14.4	
CDU	Boxhorn	4,057	14.1	▼11.1	3,422	11.8	▼7.8
BVB/FW	Raddatz	2,723	9.5	▲2.6	803	2.8	▼2.1
Left	Birnbaum	975	3.4	▼5.6	438	1.5	▼6.3
APT					444	1.5	▼0.8
FDP	Zoschke	382	1/3	▼4.2	187	0.6	▼4.1
Greens	Wagner	276	1.0	▼3.6	287	1.0	▼3.3
DLW					176	0.6	
Plus					149	0.5	▼0.5
Values					75	0.3	
Third Way					38	0.1	
DKP					15	0.1	
Informal votes		467			297		
Total valid votes		28,753			28,923		
Turnout		29,220	73.3	▲11.1			
AfD hold	Majority	4,692	16.3				

=== 2019 election ===
State election (2019): Elbe-Elster II
Notes:	Blue background denotes the winner of the electorate vote. Pink background denotes a candidate elected from their party list. Yellow background denotes an electorate win by a list member, or other incumbent. A ✓ or ✗ denotes status of any incumbent, win or lose respectively.						
Party	Candidate	Votes	%	±%	Party votes	%	±%
AfD	Volker Nothing	7,727	30.2		8,129	31.7	▲19.4
CDU	Dr. Sebastian Rick	6,449	25.2	▼14.8	5,021	19.6	▼10.6
SPD	Kerstin Weide	4,783	18.7	▼5.2	5,959	23.3	▼6.4
Left	Diana Bader	2,301	9.0	▼8.4	2,005	7.8	▼6.2
BVB/FW	Andreas Richter	1,766	6.9	▼6.1	1,259	4.9	Steady
FDP	Anja Schwinghoff	1,412	5.5		1,205	4.7	▲3.6
Greens	Valentine Siemon	1,158	4.5	▲1.8	1,107	4.3	▲2.1
Tierschutzpartei					607	2.4	
Pirates					170	0.7	▼0.7
ÖDP					90	0.4	
V-Partei3					69	0.3	
Informal votes		395			370		
Total valid votes		25,596			25,621		
Turnout		25,991	62.2	▲14.2			
AfD gain from CDU	Majority	1,278	5.0				

=== 2014 election ===
State election (2014): Elbe-Elster II
Notes:	Blue background denotes the winner of the electorate vote. Pink background denotes a candidate elected from their party list. Yellow background denotes an electorate win by a list member, or other incumbent. A ✓ or ✗ denotes status of any incumbent, win or lose respectively.						
Party	Candidate	Votes	%	±%	Party votes	%	±%
CDU	✓ Anja Heinrich	8,255	40.0	▲10.6	6,273	30.2	▲5.0
SPD	Martina Mieritz	4,928	23.9	▼1.3	6,184	29.7	▼0.1
Left	Joachim Pfützner	3,598	17.4	▼6.4	2,919	14.0	▼9.4
AfD					2,565	12.3	
BVB/FW	Daniel Mende	2,674	13.0	▲7.0	1,020	4.9	▲1.3
NPD					744	3.6	▼0.1
Pirates	Lutz Bommel	618	3.0		283	1.4	
Greens	Lutz Lehmann	556	2.7	▼0.2	460	2.2	▼0.4
FDP					230	1.1	▼6.1
REP					68	0.3	Steady
DKP					57	0.3	▲0.1
Informal votes		566			392		
Total valid votes		20,629			20,803		
Turnout		21,195	48.0	▼18.5			
CDU hold	Majority	3,327	16.1	▲11.9			

=== 2009 election ===
State election (2009): Elbe-Elster II
Notes:	Blue background denotes the winner of the electorate vote. Pink background denotes a candidate elected from their party list. Yellow background denotes an electorate win by a list member, or other incumbent. A ✓ or ✗ denotes status of any incumbent, win or lose respectively.						
Party	Candidate	Votes	%	±%	Party votes	%	±%
CDU	Anja Heinrich	8,998	29.4	▼0.6	7,743	25.2	▲1.6
SPD	Klaus Richter	7,707	25.2	▲2.1	9,159	29.8	▼1.0
Left	Joachim Pfützner	7,268	23.8	▼5.9	7,187	23.4	▲1.2
BVB/FW	Daniel Mende	1,826	6.0		1,110	3.6	
FDP	Timo Gleinig	1,754	5.7	▼0.5	2,216	7.2	▲3.8
NPD	Ronny Zasowk	1,352	4.4		1,141	3.7	
Greens	Andrea Schmidt	876	2.9	▲0.2	810	2.6	▲1.0
DVU					617	2.0	▼9.3
50Plus	Helfried Ehrling	627	2.1		351	1.1	▲0.1
Free Union	Harald Klingenberg	150	0.5				
RRP					130	0.4	
REP					96	0.3	
Die-Volksinitiative					80	0.3	
DKP					56	0.2	▲0.1
Informal votes		1,237			1,099		
Total valid votes		30,558			30,696		
Turnout		31,795	66.5	▲8.4			
CDU hold	Majority	1,291	4.2	▲3.9			

=== 2004 election ===
State election (2004): Elbe-Elster II
Notes:	Blue background denotes the winner of the electorate vote. Pink background denotes a candidate elected from their party list. Yellow background denotes an electorate win by a list member, or other incumbent. A ✓ or ✗ denotes status of any incumbent, win or lose respectively.						
Party	Candidate	Votes	%	±%	Party votes	%	±%
CDU	Frank Werner	8,284	29.65		6,303	22.17	
PDS	Ute Miething	8,284	29.65		6,303	22.17	
SPD	Detlev Leißner	6,453	23.10		8,765	30.83	
DVU					3,225	11.34	
AfW (Free Voters)	Helfried Ehrling	2,337	8.37		382	1.34	
FDP	Harald Sacher	1,739	6.23		958	3.37	
Familie					942	3.31	
Greens	Jens-Uwe Siebert	749	2.68		444	1.56	
50Plus					278	0.98	
Gray Panthers					112	0.39	
BRB					97	0.34	
Yes Brandenburg					97	0.34	
AUB-Brandenburg					75	0.26	
DKP					41	0.14	
Schill					6	0.02	
Informal votes		1,189			692		
Total valid votes		27,935			28,432		
Turnout		29,124	58.07				
CDU win new seat	Majority	89	0.32				

== See also ==
- Politics of Brandenburg
- Landtag of Brandenburg
