= New states of Germany =

Five re-established states of former East Germany

The new states of Germany (German: die neuen Länder / die neuen Bundesländer) are the five re-established states of the former German Democratic Republic (GDR) that acceded to the Federal Republic of Germany (FRG) with its 10 "old states" (without Berlin) upon German reunification on 3 October 1990.

The new states, which were dissolved by the GDR government in 1952 and were re-established in 1990, are Brandenburg, Mecklenburg-Western Pomerania, Saxony, Saxony-Anhalt, and Thuringia. The 16th state, Berlin, the result of East joining West Berlin, is usually considered neither an old nor new state. There have been 16 states in Germany since reunification.

== Demographics ==
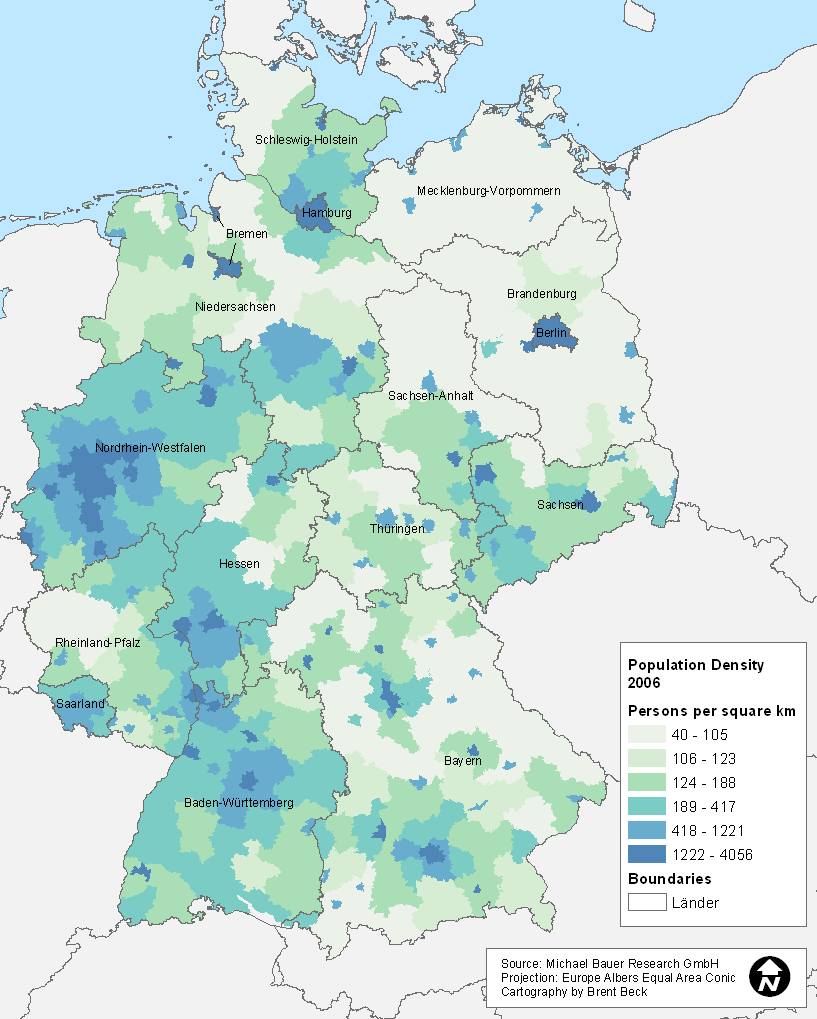
The population density of the new German states is lower than that of the old states.

Proportion of Germans without a migrant background as of 2016

After the fall of the Berlin Wall, the former East German states experienced high rates of depopulation until around 2008. About 2,000 schools closed between 1989 and 2008, because of a demographic shift to a lower number of children. In 2006, the fertility rate in the new states (1.30) approached those in the old states (1.34) and in 2016 it was higher than in the old states (1.64 vs. 1.60 in the old states). In 2019, the new states had exactly the same fertility rate as the old states (both 1.56).

More children are born out of wedlock in the new states than in the old states. In the new states, 61% of births were from unmarried women compared to 27% in the old states in 2009. Both states of Saxony-Anhalt and Mecklenburg-Western Pomerania had the highest rates of birth outside wedlock at 64% each, followed by Brandenburg with 62%, Bavaria and Hesse at 26%, while the state of Baden-Württemberg had the lowest rate at 22%.

=== Demographic evolution ===
Brandenburg had a population of 2,660,000 in 1989 and 2,531,071 in 2020. It has the second-lowest population density in Germany. In 1995, it was the only new state to experience population growth, aided by nearby Berlin.

Mecklenburg-Western Pomerania had a population of 1,970,000 in 1989 and 1,610,774 in 2020, with the lowest population density in Germany. The local Landtag held several inquiries on population trends after the opposition requested an annual report on the topic.

Saxony had a population of 5,003,000 in 1989, which fell to 4,056,094 in 2020. It remains the most populated among the five new states. The proportion of the population under 20 years of age fell from 24.6% in 1988 to 19.7% in 1999. Dresden and Leipzig are among the fastest-growing cities in Germany, both raising their population to over half a million inhabitants again.

Saxony-Anhalt had a population of 2,960,000 in 1989, which fell to 2,180,684 in 2020. The state has a long history of demographic decline: its current territory had a population of 4,100,000 in 1945. The emigration had already begun during the GDR years.

Thuringia had a population of 2,680,000 in 1989, which fell to 2,120,237 in 2020.

As of 2021, the new states have 12.5 million people, about 15% of Germany's population, and slightly less than that of Bavaria.

=== Migration ===
There are more migrants in former West Germany than in former East Germany. About 1.7 million people (or 12% of the population) had left the new states. A disproportionately high number of them were women under the age of 35. About 500,000 women under the age of 30 left for western Germany between 1993 and 2008. In some rural regions, the number of women between the ages of 20 and 30 dropped by more than 30 percent. After 2008, the net migration rate decreased significantly. In 2017, for the first time since German reunification, more people emigrated from the old states to the new states than vice versa. All of the new states have populations where 90-95% of people do not have a migrant background.

=== Religion ===
Irreligion is predominant in former East Germany. An exception is former West Berlin, which had a Christian plurality in 2016 (44.4% Christian and 43.5% unaffiliated). It also has a higher share of Muslims at 8.5%, compared to former East Berlin with only 1.5% self-declared Muslims as of 2016.

Eurostat's Eurobarometer survey in 2015, found that 27.0% of the adult population declared themselves as agnostics or non believer, while 34.1% declared themselves as atheists. Christians comprised 37.2% of the total population; by denomination, members of the Protestant Churches were 19.2%, members of other Christian denominations were 8.8%, Catholics were 7.1%, the Christian Orthodox were 2.1%.

An explanation for the atheism in the new states, popular in other states, is the aggressive state atheist policies of the former GDR government. However, the enforcement of atheism existed only for the first few years. After that, the state allowed churches to have a relatively high level of autonomy.

Another explanation could be the secularizing trend (the "Kulturkampf") dating back to the second half of the 19th century in Prussia and through the Weimar Republic which was strongest in the states of Thuringia and Saxony as well as the late arrival of Christianity to the region as opposed to southern Europe where it was the state religion from late antiquity.

Religion by state, 2016	Protestants	Catholics	Not religious	Muslims	Others
Brandenburg	24.9%	3.5%	69.9%	0.0%	1.5%
former East Berlin	14.3%	7.5%	74.3%	1.5%	2.4%
Mecklenburg-Western Pomerania	24.9%	3.9%	70.0%	0.3%	0.9%
Saxony	27.6%	4.0%	66.9%	0.3%	1.1%
Saxony-Anhalt	18.8%	5.1%	74.7%	0.3%	1.2%
Thuringia	27.8%	9.5%	61.2%	0.0%	1.5%
Total	24.3%	5.2%	68.8%	0.3%	1.4%

=== Major cities ===
Federal capital
State capital

Rank	City	Pop. 1950	Pop. 1960	Pop. 1970	Pop. 1980	Pop. 1990	Pop. 2000	Pop. 2010	Pop. 2022	Area [km^{2}]	Density per km^{2}	Growth [%] (2010– 2022)	surpassed 100,000	State (Bundesland)
1.	Berlin	3,336,026	3,274,016	3,208,719	3,048,759	3,433,695	3,382,169	3,460,725	3,570,750	887,70	3,899	3.18	1747	Berlin
2.	Dresden	494,187	493,603	502,432	516,225	490,571	477,807	523,058	585,446	328,31	1,593	11.93	1852	Saxony
3.	Leipzig	617,574	589,632	583,885	562,480	511,079	493,208	522,883	600,609	297,36	1,758	14.86	1871	Saxony
4.	Chemnitz	293,373	286,329	299,411	317,644	294,244	259,246	243,248	264,042	220,84	1,101	8.55	1883	Saxony
5.	Halle	289,119	277,855	257,261	232,294	247,736	247,736	232,963	251,358	135,02	1,725	7.90	1890	Saxony-Anhalt
6.	Magdeburg	260,305	261,594	272,237	289,032	278,807	231,450	231,549	249,597	200,99	1,152	7.79	1882	Saxony-Anhalt
7.	Erfurt	188,650	186,448	196,528	211,575	208,989	200,564	204,994	227,342	269,14	762	10.9	1906	Thuringia
8.	Rostock	133,109	158,630	198,636	232,506	248,088	200,506	202,735	216,466	181,26	1,118	6.8	1935	Mecklenburg-Vorpommern
9.	Potsdam	118,180	115,004	111,336	130,900	139,794	129,324	156,906	190,422	187,53	837	21.4	1939	Brandenburg
Total		5,730,523	5,643,111	5,630,445	5,541,415	5,853,003	5,622,010	5,779,061	6,156,052	2,708	2,134	2.79		
Rank	City	Pop. 1950	Pop. 1960	Pop. 1970	Pop. 1980	Pop. 1990	Pop. 2000	Pop. 2010	Pop. 2022	Area [km^{2}]	Density per km^{2}	Growth [%] (2000– 2010)	surpassed 100,000	State (Land)

== Economy ==
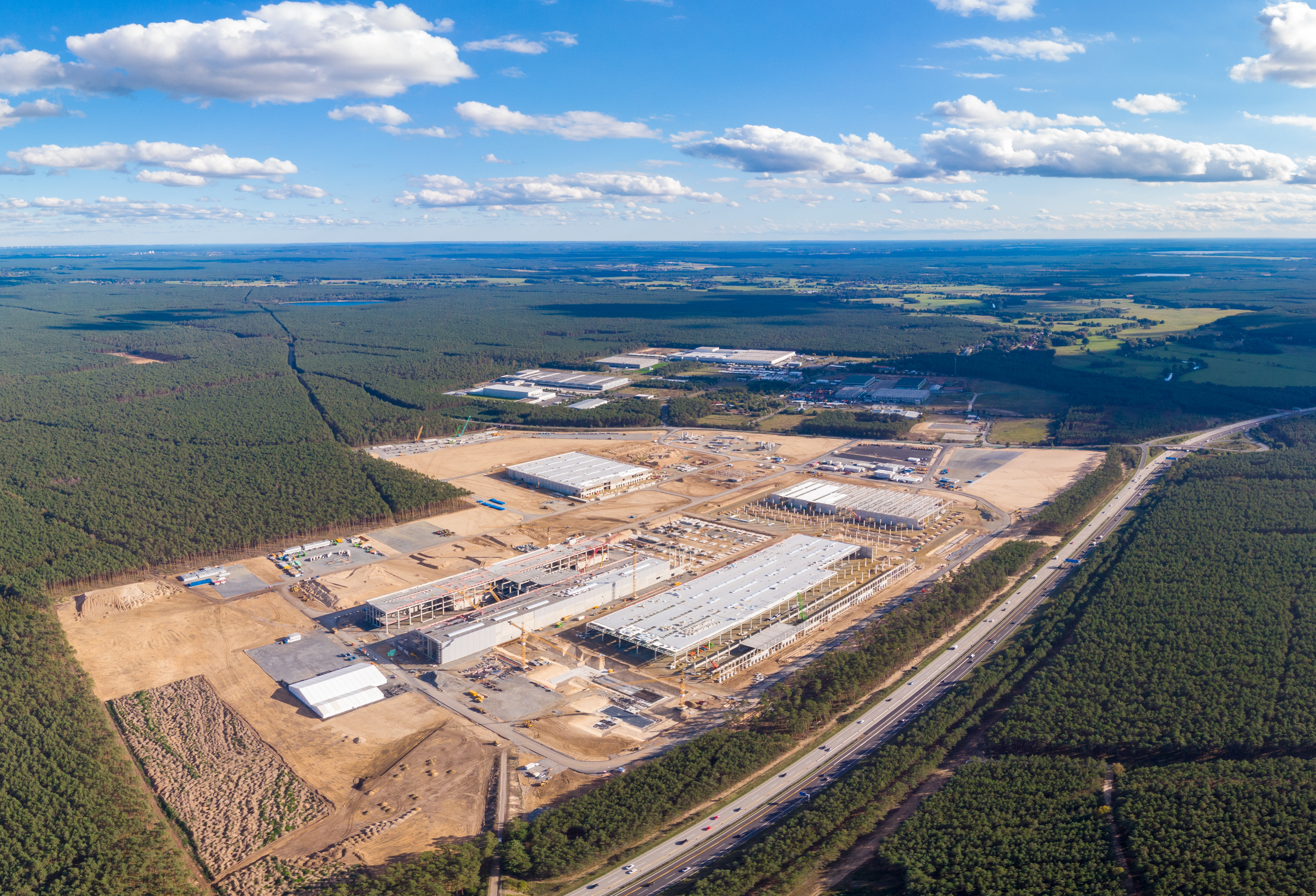
Tesla Gigafactory, seen under construction, in Grünheide, Brandenburg

The economic reconstruction of eastern Germany (German: Aufbau Ost) proved to be longer-term than originally foreseen. As of 2005, the standard of living and average annual income remained significantly lower in the new states.

The federal government spent €2 trillion to reunify and privatise 8,500 state-owned east German enterprises. Almost all East German industries were considered outdated at the time of reunification. Since 1990, amounts between €100 billion and €140 billion have been transferred to the new states annually. More than €60 billion were spent supporting businesses and building infrastructure in the years 2006–2008.

A €156 billion economic plan, Solidarity Pact II, was enforced in 2005 and provided the financial basis for the advancement and special promotion of the economy of the new states until 2019. The "solidarity tax", a 5.5% surcharge on the income tax, was implemented by the Kohl government to match the infrastructure of the new states to the levels of the western ones and to apportion the cost of unification and the expenses of both the Gulf War and European integration. The tax, which raises €11 billion annually, was planned to remain in force until 2019.

Since reunification, the unemployment rate in the East has doubled that of the West. The unemployment rate reached 12.7% in April 2010, after reaching a maximum of 18.7% in 2005. As of 2020, the unemployment rates in the new states were lower than in some old states.

In the decade 1999–2009, economic activity per person rose from 67% to 71% of western Germany. Wolfgang Tiefensee, the minister then responsible for the development of the new states, said in 2009: "The gap is closing." The new states are also the part of the country that was least affected by the 2008 financial crisis.

Women in the eastern Germany are more likely to be employed full-time and reach higher positions in their career, and work longer hours. During the division of Germany, East German women were encouraged to seek full-time employment, housewives were derided as "parasites" (Schmarotzer); in contrast to West Germany, where tax and benefits system discouraged dual-earner families, so working mothers were seen in a negative light and derided as "raven mothers" (Rabenmutter). At the time of reunification, almost 90% of women in East Germany were in full-time employment, whilst only about 55% in West Germany. In addition, East German mothers tend to have children earlier in life and return to work after taking just one year of maternity leave (as was the standard in the former East Germany), whilst women from the Western states usually stay on maternity leave for the full 3 years until job protection ends.

All the new states qualify as Objective 1 development regions within the European Union and were eligible to receive investment subsidies of up to 30% until 2013.

== Infrastructure ==
The German Unity Transport Projects (German: Verkehrsprojekte Deutsche Einheit, VDE) is a programme launched in 1991 that is intended to upgrade the infrastructure of eastern Germany and modernize transport links between the old and new states. It consists of nine railway projects, seven motorway projects, and one waterway project with a total budget of €38.5 billion. As of 2009, all 17 projects were under construction or have been completed. The construction of new railway lines and high-speed upgrades of existing lines reduced journey times between Berlin and Hanover from over four hours to 96 minutes. Multiple railway lines (branches and main lines) have been closed by the unified Deutsche Bahn (German Railways) because of increased car usage and depopulation. The VDE states that some main lines are still not finished or upgraded, with the Leipzig-Nuremberg line (via Erfurt and part of the Munich-Berlin route) scheduled to come on-line in December 2017, almost three decades after reunification.

Deutsche Einheit Fernstraßenplanungs- und -bau GmbH, (English: German Unity Road Construction Company; DEGES) is the state-owned project management institution responsible for the construction of approximately 1,360 km of federal roads within the VDE with a total budget of €10.2 billion. It is also involved in other transport projects, including 435 km of roads costing about €1,760 million as well as a city tunnel in Leipzig costing €685 million.

The Federal Transport Infrastructure Plan 2003 includes plans to extend the A14 motorway from Magdeburg to Schwerin and to build the A72 from Chemnitz to Leipzig.

Private ownership rates of cars have increased since 1990: in 1988, 55% of East German households had at least one car; in 1993 it rose to 67% and 71% in 1998, compared to the West German rates of 61% in 1988, 74% in 1993, and 76% in 1998.

== Culture ==
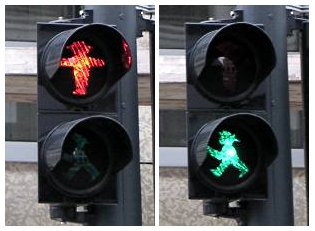
The Ampelmännchen, a symbol of East German culture

Persisting differences in culture and mentality among older East Germans and West Germans are often referred to as the "wall in the head" ("Mauer im Kopf"). Stereotypes exist, with Ossis ('Easties') portrayed as racist, poor and largely influenced by Russian culture, and Wessis ('Westies') as snobbish, dishonest, wealthy, and selfish. The terms can be considered to be disparaging.

In 2009, a poll found that 22% of former East Germans (40% under 25) considered themselves "real citizens of the Federal Republic"; 62% felt they were no longer citizens of East Germany, but not fully integrated into the unified Germany; and around 11% would have liked to have re-established East Germany. An earlier poll in 2004 found that 25% of West Germans and 12% of East Germans wished reunification had not happened.

In 2023, a poll found that 40% of people in the eastern states still identify as East Germans rather than just German; the latter was chosen by the majority with 52%.

Some East German brands have been revived to appeal to former East Germans who are nostalgic for the goods they grew up with. Brands revived in this manner include Rotkäppchen, which holds about 40% of the German sparkling wine market, and Zeha, the sports shoe maker that supplied most of East Germany's sports teams as well as the Soviet Union national football team.

== Politics ==
Unlike the West, there was a three-party system (CDU, SPD, PDS/The Left) until the Alternative für Deutschland (AfD) formed in 2013, creating a four-party system. Since 2009 at least four factions have been represented in each of the East German regional parliaments, six in Saxony. In 1998/1999, for example, only one of the regional parliaments included more than three factions. In the elections to the Bundestag, the CDU, SPD, FDP and Greens almost always receive fewer votes in the new states than in the old states, while Die Linke (and since 2024 splinter group BSW) and AfD receive more votes and support in the new states than in the old states.

=== Left-wing ===
Die Linke party vote share in the 2009 German federal election

The democratic socialist party, Die Linke ('The Left', successor to the Party of Democratic Socialism, the GDR state party's successor) has been successful throughout eastern Germany, perhaps as a result of the continued disparity of living conditions and salaries compared with western Germany, and high unemployment. Die Linke membership rose to a high of 78,000 in 2009, subsequently settling at around 60,000 before surging to over 120,000 after the 2025 federal election. After the 2009 federal election it has lost vote share in the eastern states while gaining votes in the rest of Germany.

The Party of Democratic Socialism (PDS), and Die Linke from 2005, have gained the following vote shares in recent elections:

Election	Vote percentages
1990 East German general election	16.4%, Communist Party of Germany (KPD) 0.1%
1990 all-German federal election	East 11.1%, West 0.2%
1990 state elections	East Berlin 30.1%, KPD 0.2%; Mecklenburg-Vorpommern 15.7%; Saxony 10.2%; Saxony-Anhalt 12.0%; Thuringia 9.7%; East Berlin 23.6%
1994 federal election	East 19.8%, West 1%
1994 state elections	18.7% in Brandenburg; 19.9% in Saxony-Anhalt; Saxony 16.5%; Thuringia 16.6%; 22.7% in Mecklenburg-Vorpommern
1995 Berlin state election	in East Berlin the PDS was the biggest party with 36.3%.
1998 federal election	East 21.6%, West 1.2%.
1998–99 state elections	23.3% in Brandenburg; 19.6% in Saxony-Anhalt; Saxony 22.2%, KPD 0.1%; Thuringia 21.3%; 24.4% in Mecklenburg-Vorpommern; 39.5% in East Berlin.
2001–02 state elections	16.4% in Mecklenburg-Vorpommern; 20.4%, KPD/DKP 0.1% in Saxony-Anhalt; 47.6%, 0.2% DKP in East Berlin.
2002 federal election	East 16.9%, West 1.1%
2005 federal election	East 25.3%, West 4.9%
2004–06 state elections	16.8% in Mecklenburg-Vorpommern (+0.5% WASG), 24.1% in Saxony-Anhalt and 28.1% (+3.3% WASG) in East Berlin (–19.5%).
2009 federal election	East 28.5% (The Left became the strongest force in Brandenburg and Saxony-Anhalt); West 8.3%.
2009 state elections	20.6% in Saxony, 27.2% in Brandenburg and 27.4% in Thuringia
2011 state elections	18.6% in Mecklenburg-Vorpommern, 23.7% in Saxony-Anhalt and 22.7% in East Berlin.
2013 federal election	East 22.7%, West 5.2%.
2014 state elections	18.9% in Saxony, 28.2% in Thuringia and 18.6% in Brandenburg (–8.6%).
2014 European Parliament election	German Communist Party (DKP) had its strongest vote in Eastern Germany (0.2% in East, 0.0% in West).
2016 state elections	16.3% in Saxony-Anhalt, 13.2% in Mecklenburg-Vorpommern and 23.4% in Berlin
2017 federal election	East 17.8%; West 7.4%.
2021 federal election	East 10.4%; West 3.7%.
2024 state elections	13.1% in Thuringia, 4.5% in Saxony and 3% in Brandenburg
2025 federal election	East 12.9%; West 7.9%.

View source data.

In 2024, a faction led by Sahra Wagenknecht split from The Left, forming a new party, Sahra Wagenknecht Alliance (BSW), with more populist, nationalist and cultural conservative tendencies. BSW quickly dominated over The Left in the 2024 state elections, but saw their support drop by the 2025 federal election and due to their low level of support in the West, fell narrowly short of the 5% threshold necessary to gain seats in Bundestag. In addition, The Left managed to regain some support in the East, and BSW outperformed The Left only in Saxony-Anhalt (11.24% vs 10.75%), and got only 36 votes less than The Left (10.696% vs 10.698%) in Brandenburg.

Election	Vote percentages
2024 state elections	15.8% in Thuringia, 13.5% in Brandenburg and 11.8% in Saxony
2025 federal election	East 9.9%; West 3.8%.

After losing votes to the AfD, the Left plans to establish a regional group in eastern Germany.

=== Far-right ===
Second vote share percentage for the AfD in the 2013 federal election in Germany, final results

Second vote share percentage for the AfD in the 2017 federal election in Germany, final results

After 1990, far-right and German nationalist groups gained followers. Some sources claim mostly among people frustrated by the high unemployment and the poor economic situation. Der Spiegel also points out that these people are primarily single men and that there may also be socio-demographic reasons. Since around 1998 the support for right-wing parties shifted from the south of Germany to the east.

The far-right party German People's Union (DVU) formed in 1998 in Saxony-Anhalt and Brandenburg since 1999. In 2009, the party lost its representation in the Landtag of Brandenburg.

The far-right National Democratic Party of Germany (NPD) was represented in the Saxon State Parliament from 2004 to 2014. In Mecklenburg-Vorpommern the NPD losts its representation in the parliament following the 2016 state elections. In 2009, Junge Landsmannschaft Ostdeutschland, supported by the NPD, organized a march on the anniversary of the Bombing of Dresden in World War II. There were 6,000 Nationalists which were met by tens of thousands of ″anti-Nazis″ and several thousand policemen.

The Free Voters of Germany emerged in 2009 from the Land Brandenburg regional branch of Free Voters, after being excluded because of "signs of right infiltration" from the Federal Association of Free Voters Germany.

Pegida has its focus in eastern Germany. A survey by TNS Emnid reports that in mid-December 2014, 53% of East Germans in each case sympathised with the PEGIDA demonstrators. (48% in the West)

The Alternative for Germany (Alternative für Deutschland; AfD) had the most votes in the new states of Germany in the 2013 German federal elections, in 2017. and in 2021 elections. The party is seen as harbouring anti-immigration views.

In 2016, AfD reached at least 17% in Saxony-Anhalt, Mecklenburg-Western Pomerania (where the NPD lost all seats) and Berlin.

In 2015, Rhineland-Palatinate interior minister Roger Lewentz said the former communist states were "more susceptible" to "xenophobic radicalization" because former East Germany had not had the same exposure to foreign people and cultures over the decades that the people in the West of the country have had.

In the 2017 federal election, AfD received approximately 22% of the votes in the East and approximately 11% in the West.

In the 2021 federal election, the AfD emerged as the largest in the states of Saxony and Thuringia, and saw a strong performance in eastern Germany.

The AfD became the biggest party in all five former East German states in the 2024 European Parliament election in Germany.

In the 2024 Thuringian state election, the AfD became the first far-right party in Germany since the Nazi Party to win a plurality of seats in a state election, it was also the best ever performance and the first time it placed first in a state election in Germany.

In the 2025 federal election, the AfD emerged as the largest party in all five former East German states.

=== Protest vote ===
The AfD and Die Linke, receive a large number of protest votes in eastern Germany, which causes voter shifting from left to right and vice versa.

The Pirate Party Germany was chosen slightly more frequently in the East (10.1 percent) than in the West (8.1 percent) of Berlin. Among those under 30 years of age in East Berlin, the Pirates were the second most popular party with 20 percent of the votes. For example, none of the parties elected to the Berlin House of Representatives in 2011 lost a high proportion of their voters to the AfD as the Pirates at the next election in 2016 (16%). Other findings also suggest that some of their voters, like the AfD, regard the Pirate Party primarily as a protest party.

The election slogans of the DVU in the regional elections in Saxony-Anhalt in 1998 were directed primarily against the politicians already represented in parliament: "Not the people – the political bigwigs, will dole!" And "German, let's not make the sow you. DVU – The protest in the election against dirty things from above". In particular, politically dissatisfied people were advertised towards with the slogan "vote protest – vote German." At the time, the DVU had 12.9% of the votes.

=== Independence ===
In 1991, the PDS demanded the right for Thuringia to leave the united Germany in its draft of the constitution, which ultimately did not pass.

Tatjana Festerling was a leader in the Dresden Pegida demonstrations from February 2015 to mid-April 2016 after Kathrin Oertel withdrew. She demanded the "Säxit"—the secession of Saxony from the Federal Republic of Germany—on October 12, 2015, after she had already demanded the rebuilding of the former Iron Curtain over Germany on March 9, 2015. The Freie Sachsen (Free Saxons) political party, founded in 2021, similarly supports a "Säxit" and advocates for the re-establishment of the Saxon monarchy.

==== Opinion polls ====
Percentage of respondents supporting independence from the new states of Germany:

Polling firm	Fieldwork date	Sample size	Brandenburg	Berlin	Mecklenburg-Vorpommern	Saxony	Saxony-Anhalt	Thuringia
YouGov (Note: The asked question was about the individual federal state seceding, not the whole of former East Germany.)	2017	2076	19	13	21	21	20	22
infratest dimap	2014	2020	16					
Insa-Consulere	2014	~1000	19 (partially)					
Emnid	2010	1001	15 (+8 partially)					
Sozialwissenschaftliche Forschungszentrum Berlin-Brandenburg	2010	~1900	10					
Emnid	2009	1208	57 (partially)					
RP Online	2009	2892	11					
Infratest dimap	2007	?					23	
Institut für Marktforschung Leipzig	2007	1001	18					
mitBERLIN	1996	6000	63.6					
Infratest	1996	2000	22					
Infratest	1990	?	11					

== See also ==
- East German jokes
- Old states of Germany
- Ossi and Wessi
- Ostalgie
