= List of electoral districts in the Landtag of Brandenburg =

Landstag Electoral Districts in Brandenburg for 2004 and 2009

This list of electoral districts in the Landtag of Brandenburg contains the current electoral districts for the fourth election period for the Landtag of Brandenburg as well as for the fifth election cycle in the Landtag of Brandenburg on September 27, 2009.

== History ==
Since the first Landtag elections to the Landtag of Brandenburg on October 14, 1990 there existed 44 electoral districts with one direct mandate, which still included many list mandates. The former constituency boundaries are oriented to the districts and cities, that were accepted in the former DDR. In the outline of the Kreisreform Brandenburg 1993 many necessary changes were made but the number of electoral districts and mandates remained constant. The new version of the Brandenburg Election Laws (January 28, 2004) contained further modifications to the classifications of these area. Compared to the previous Landstag elections in 1999, new classifications reflected the changing population trends in various parts of the country and well as the changing municipal boundaries. These areas remained the same during the Landstag elections of 2009.

The legal minimum of members in the Landstag is 88, so that, in addition to the 44 direct mandates, there would also be 44 members elected by a list mandate who would be awarded electoral districts. Though overhang seats and leveling seats the number of members can increase to a maximum of 110 members.

== Elector districts with area descriptions ==
Nr.	Electoral district	Area
1	Prignitz I	Wittenberge, Amt Bad Wilsnack/Weisen, Gumtow, Karstädt, Amt Lenzen-Elbtalaue, Perleberg, Plattenburg
2	Prignitz II/Ostprignitz-Ruppin II	From Landkreis Prignitz the areas of Pritzwalk und Groß Pankow as well as Ämter Meyenburg and Putlitz-Berge, from Landkreis Ostprignitz-Ruppin the areas of Wittstock, Heiligengrabe and Kyritz
3	Ostprignitz-Ruppin I	Neuruppin, Rheinsberg, Fehrbellin, Amt Lindow, Amt Temnitz
4	Ostprignitz-Ruppin III/Havelland II	From Landkreis Ostprignitz-Ruppin the areas of Wusterhausen/Dosse und das Amt Neustadt (Dosse), from Landkreis Havelland to the areas of Rathenow, Milower Land and Premnitz as well as Amt Rhinow
5	Havelland I	Nauen, Brieselang, Amt Friesack, Ketzin, Amt Nennhausen, Wustermark
6	Havelland II	Falkensee, Dallgow-Döberitz, Schönwalde-Glien
7	Oberhavel I	Hennigsdorf, Kremmen, Löwenberger Land, Oberkrämer, Velten
8	Oberhavel II	Birkenwerder, Glienicke/Nordbahn, Hohen Neuendorf, Mühlenbecker Land
9	Oberhavel III	Oranienburg, Leegebruch, Liebenwalde
10	Uckermark III/Oberhavel IV	In Landkreis Uckermark the areas of Templin, Boitzenburger Land and Lychen, in Landkreis Oberhavel the areas of Fürstenberg/Havel und Zehdenick sowie das Amt Gransee und Gemeinden
11	Uckermark I	Prenzlau, Angermünde, Amt Brüssow, Amt Gerswalde, Amt Gramzow, Nordwestuckermark, Uckerland
12	Uckermark II	Schwedt/Oder, Amt Gartz, Amt Oder-Welse
13	Barnim I	Eberswalde, Amt Joachimsthal, Schorfheide
14	Barnim II	Bernau, Panketal
15	Barnim III	Wandlitz, Werneuchen, Ahrensfelde, Amt Biesenthal-Barnim, Amt Britz-Chorin-Oderberg
16	Brandenburg an der Havel I/Potsdam-Mittelmark I	In Brandenburg an der Havel the districts of Görden and Plaue, in Landkreis Potsdam-Mittelmark the areas of Groß Kreutz and Kloster Lehnin as well as the Ämter Wusterwitz, Ziesar und Beetzsee
17	Brandenburg an der Havel II	Brandenburg an der Havel except for the districts of Görden and Plaue
18	Potsdam-Mittelmark II	Beelitz, Belzig, Amt Brück, Amt Niemegk, Seddiner See, Treuenbrietzen, Wiesenburg
19	Potsdam-Mittelmark III/Potsdam III	Vom Landkreis Potsdam-Mittelmark die Gemeinden Michendorf, Schwielowsee und Werder (Havel), von Potsdam die Ortsteile Fahrland, Groß Glienicke, Marquardt, Neu Fahrland, Satzkorn und Uetz-Paaren
20	Potsdam-Mittelmark IV	Kleinmachnow, Nuthetal, Stahnsdorf, Teltow
21	Potsdam I	In Potsdam the neighborhoods of Innenstadt-West, Potsdam Nord, Nördliche Vorstädte, Westliche Vorstädte, Babelsberg and Golm
22	Potsdam II	In Potsdam the districts of Am Stern, Drewitz, Kirchsteigfeld, Potsdam Süd and Zentrum Ost
23	Teltow-Fläming I	Ludwigsfelde, Am Mellensee, Großbeeren, Nuthe-Urstromtal, Trebbin
24	Teltow-Fläming II	Jüterbog, Luckenwalde, Amt Dahme/Mark, Niederer Fläming, Niedergörsdorf
25	Teltow-Fläming III	Zossen, Baruth, Blankenfelde-Mahlow, Rangsdorf
26	Dahme-Spreewald I	Schönefeld, Bestensee, Eichwalde, Mittenwalde, Schulzendorf, Wildau, Zeuthen
27	Dahme-Spreewald II/Oder-Spree I	In Landkreis Dahme-Spreewald the areas of Königs Wusterhausen, in Landkreis Oder-Spree the areas of Storkow and Tauche as well as the Ämter Scharmützelsee and Spreenhagen
28	Dahme-Spreewald III	Lübben, Luckau, Amt Golßener Land, Heideblick, Heidesee, Amt Lieberose, Märkische Heide, Amt Schenkenländchen, Amt Unterspreewald
29	Oder-Spree II	Eisenhüttenstadt, Amt Brieskow-Finkenheerd, Friedland, Amt Neuzelle, Amt Schlaubetal
30	Oder-Spree III	Fürstenwalde, Beeskow, Grünheide, Amt Odervorland, Rietz-Neuendorf, Steinhöfel
31	Märkisch-Oderland I/Oder-Spree IV	In Landkreis Märkisch-Oderland the areas of Hoppegarten and Neuenhagen, in Landkreis Oder-Spree the areas of Erkner, Schöneiche and Woltersdorf
32	Märkisch-Oderland II	Strausberg, Petershagen/Eggersdorf, Rüdersdorf
33	Märkisch-Oderland III	Bad Freienwalde, Altlandsberg, Amt Barnim-Oderbruch, Amt Falkenberg-Höhe, Fredersdorf-Vogelsdorf, Wriezen
34	Märkisch-Oderland IV	Seelow, Amt Golzow, Amt Lebus, Letschin, Amt Märkische Schweiz, Müncheberg, Amt Neuhardenberg, Amt Seelow-Land
35	Frankfurt (Oder)	Frankfurt (Oder)
36	Elbe-Elster I	Finsterwalde, Falkenberg, Herzberg, Amt Kleine Elster, Amt Schlieben, Schönewalde, Sonnewalde, Uebigau-Wahrenbrück
37	Elbe-Elster II	Bad Liebenwerda, Doberlug-Kirchhain, Amt Elsterland, Elsterwerda, Mühlberg, Amt Plessa, Röderland, Amt Schradenland
38	Oberspreewald-Lausitz I	Lauchhammer, Amt Ortrand, Amt Ruhland, Schipkau, Schwarzheide
39	Oberspreewald-Lausitz II/Spree-Neiße IV	In Landkreis Oberspreewald-Lausitz the areas of Senftenberg and Großräschen as well as Amt Altdöbern, in Landkreis Spree-Neiße the area of Drebkau
40	Oberspreewald-Lausitz III/Spree-Neiße III	In Landkreis Oberspreewald-Lausitz the areas of Lübbenau, Calau and Vetschau, in Landkreis Spree-Neiße the areas of Kolkwitz and Amt Burg
41	Spree-Neiße I	Guben, Forst, Amt Peitz, Schenkendöbern
42	Spree-Neiße II	Spremberg, Amt Döbern-Land, Haidemühl, Neuhausen, Welzow
43	Cottbus I	in Cottbus the cities or districts of Branitz, Dissenchen, Döbbrick, Merzdorf, Mitte, Sandow, Saspow, Schmellwitz, Sielow, Skadow and Willmersdorf
44	Cottbus II	in Cottbus the cities or areas of Kahren, Madlow, Sachsendorf, Spremberger Vorstadt und Ströbitz sowie Gallinchen, Groß Gaglow and Kiekebusch

== Changes to the Landtag elections in 2014 ==
There were some modifications to the electoral districts as a result of the Second law for changes to the constituency boundaries for the elections in the Landtag Brandenburg' (Zweite Gesetz zur Änderung der Wahlkreiseinteilung für die Wahl zum Landtag Brandenburg) which took effect on May 16, 2013:

- As the basis for the assisting in the enlargement of constituencies in the future, an electoral college will be used instead of a general vote count.
- The city of Velten will no longer belong to the Wahlkreis Oberhavel II and is now in the Wahlkreis Oberhavel I
- The Wahlkreis Potsdam-Mittelmark III/Potsdam III lost the area of Michendorf to the Wahlkreis Potsdam-Mittelmark II and gains Potsdamer Stadtteile Bornim, Bornstedt, Eiche, Golm, Grube, Nedlitz and Sacrow.
- The Wahlkreis Potsdam I includes the districts of Nördliche Innenstadt, Babelsberg, Klein Glienicke, Westliche Vorstädte and Nördliche Vorstädte.
- The Wahlkreis Potsdam II includes the districts of Drewitz, Kirchsteigfeld, Potsdam Süd, Stern and Südliche Innenstadt/Zentrum Ost

Further changes to community names were made and Golßener Land was removed and incorporated into Amy Unterspreewald. These changes were first applied in the 2014 Brandenburg Landstag Elections on September 14, 2014.
