= Herbert Knoblich =

German politician (1939–2021)

President of the Landtag of Brandenburg
- In office 14 October 1990 – 19 September 2004
- Preceded by: position established
- Succeeded by: Gunter Fritsch

Personal details
- Born: 11 June 1939 Alt Jauernick, Silesia, Prussia, Germany
- Died: 5 December 2021 (aged 82)
- Party: SPD

Herbert Knoblich (11 June 1939 – 5 December 2021) was a German physicist and politician. A member of the Social Democratic Party of Germany, he served as president of the Landtag of Brandenburg from 1990 to 2004.
