= Christel Fiebiger =

German politician

Member of European Parliament
- In office 1999–2004

Member of the Landtag of Brandenburg
- In office 1990–1999

Personal details
- Born: December 29, 1946 (age 79) Plattenburg, Soviet Occupation Zone
- Party: The Left (2007–); Party of Democratic Socialism (1989–2007); Socialist Unity Party of Germany (1969–1989)

Christel Fiebiger (born 1946) is a German politician. She was a member of the Landtag of Brandenburg from 1990 to 1999, and a member of the Fifth European Parliament from 1999 to 2004.

== Life ==
Christel Fiebiger was born on 29 December 1946 in Uenze-Brandenburg. She was an agricultural engineer before entering politics.
