= Kerstin Kaiser =

German politician (born 1960)

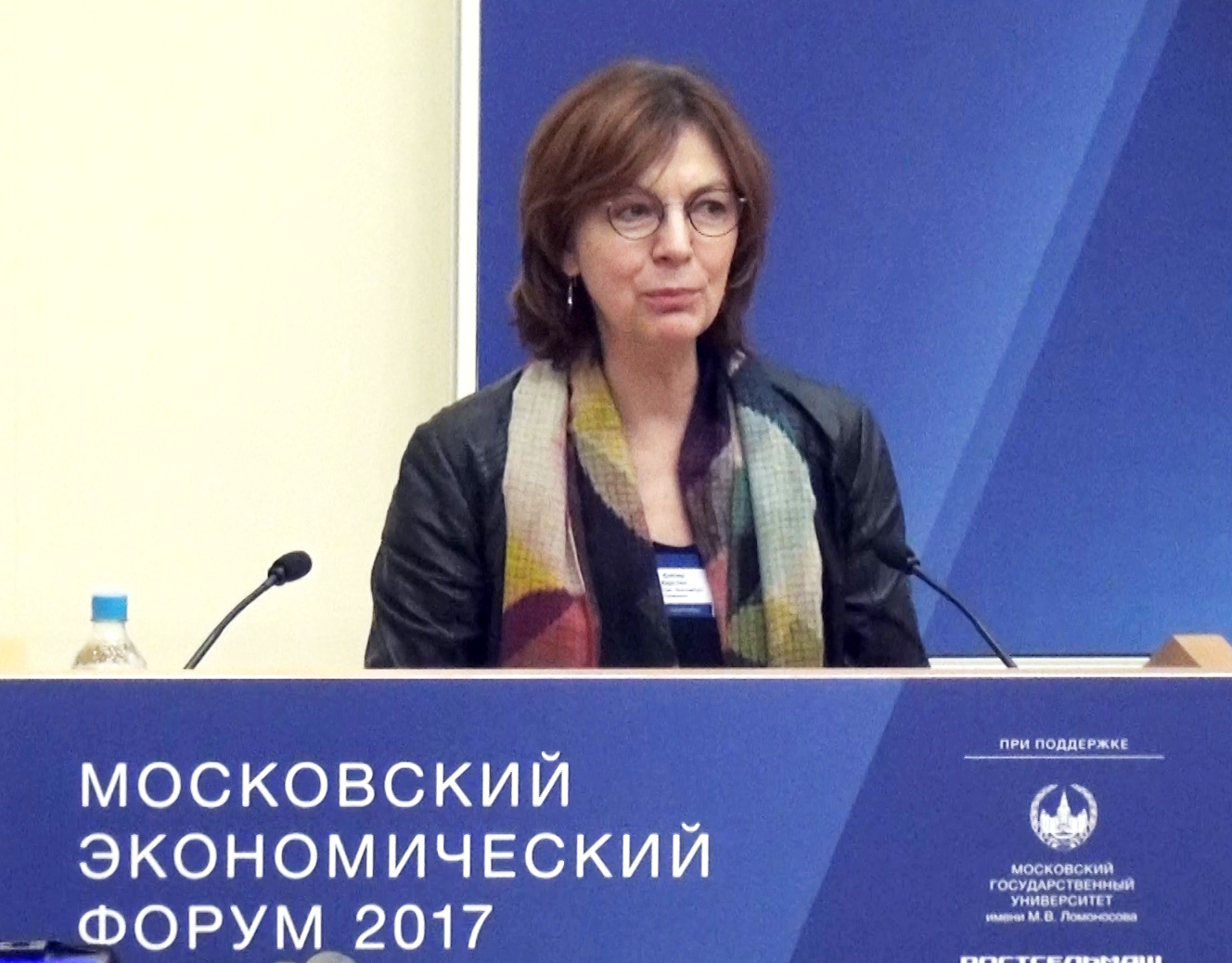
- Kaiser at Moscow Economic Forum in 2017

Member of the Brandenburg Landtag
- In office 1999–2016

Personal details
- Born: 16 July 1960 (age 66) Stralsund, East Germany
- Party: Die Linke
- Occupation: Teacher

Kerstin Kaiser (born 16 July 1960 in Stralsund) is a German politician for the left wing party The Left.

Following her studies of Russian at the Leningrad University (now the Saint Petersburg State University), she worked as a teacher at the party school of the Socialist Unity Party of Germany (SED) (Parteischule beim ZK der SED "Karl Liebknecht"). She became an informer for the Stasi already as a student in 1979, under the code name "Kathrin". As a Stasi informer, she spied on her fellow students.

She became a member of the ruling SED party in 1980, and continued as member of its successor parties, now The Left. She was deputy chair of the party (then known as PDS) from 1991 to 1995, and deputy chair of the state party in Brandenburg from 1995 to 1997. She was elected to the Landtag of Brandenburg in 1999.
