= 1999 Brandenburg state election =

State election in Brandenburg, Germany

← 1994	5 September 1999	2004 →

All 89 seats in the Landtag of Brandenburg 45 seats needed for a majority
- Turnout: 1,102,360 (54.3%) ▼2.0%
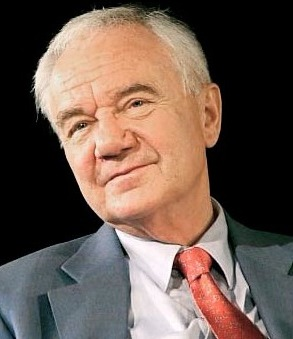

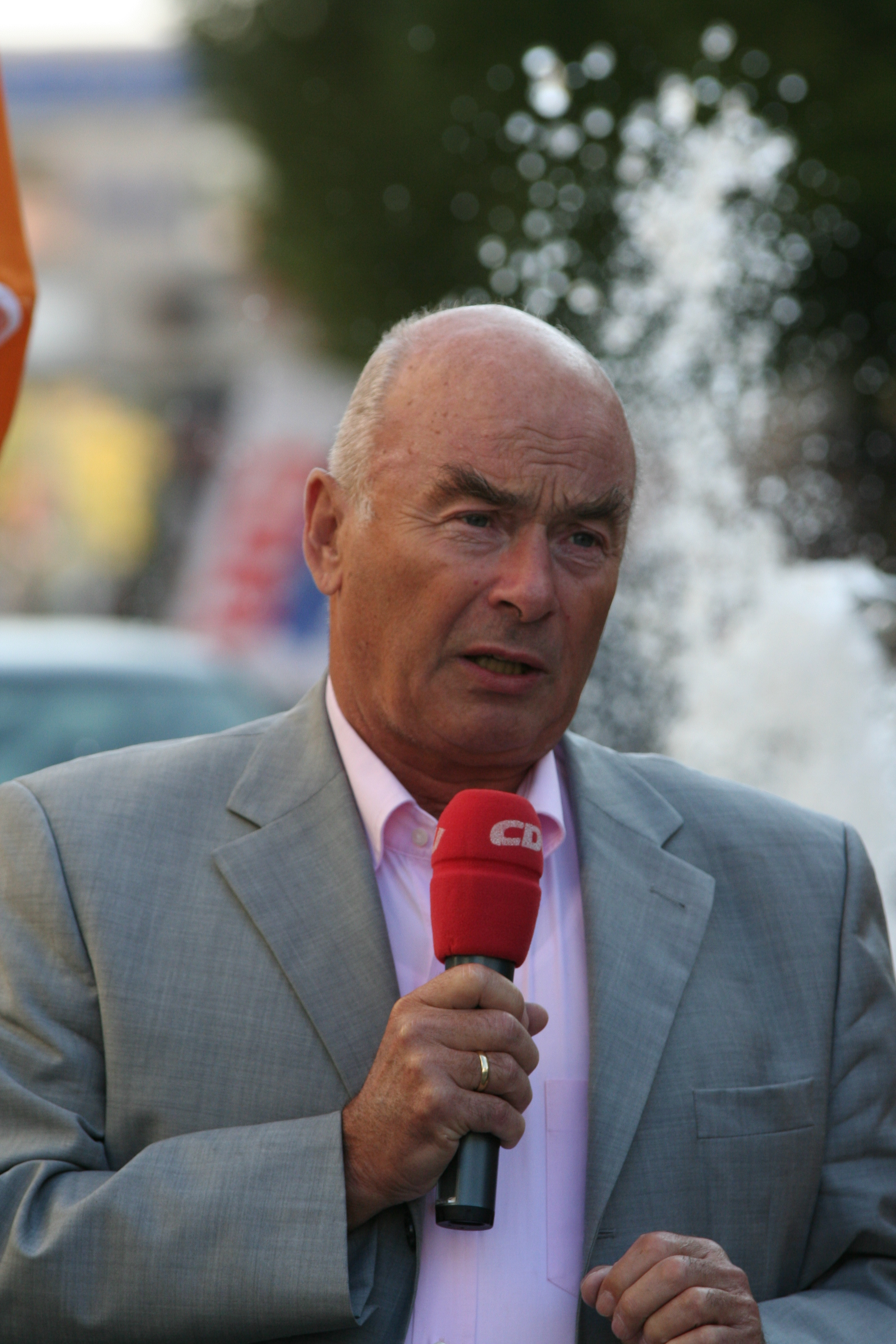
	First party	Second party
Leader	Manfred Stolpe	Jörg Schönbohm
Party	SPD	CDU
Leader's seat	Cottbus II	State-wide party list
Last election	52 seats, 54.1%	18 seats, 18.7%
Seats won	37	25
Seat change	▼15	▲7
Popular vote	433,521	292,634
Percentage	39.3%	26.5%
Swing	▼14.8%	▲7.8%
	Third party	Fourth party
	PDS	DVU
Leader	Wolfgang Thiel	Axel Hesselbarth
Party	PDS	DVU
Leader's seat	State-wide party list	Did not run
Last election	18 seats, 18.7%	Did not contest
Seats won	22	5
Seat change	▲4	▲5
Popular vote	257,309	58,247
Percentage	23.3%	5.3%
Swing	▲4.6%	▲5.3%
- Results for the single-member constituencies
Government before election
Stolpe II
SPD majority
Government after election
Stolpe III
SPD–CDU

The 1999 Brandenburg state election was held on 5 September 1999 to elect the members of the 3rd Landtag of Brandenburg. The incumbent Social Democratic Party (SPD) majority government led by Minister-President Manfred Stolpe lost its majority. The SPD subsequently formed a grand coalition with the Christian Democratic Union (CDU), and Stolpe continued as Minister-President.

== Parties ==
The table below lists parties represented in the 2nd Landtag of Brandenburg.

Name		Ideology	Leader(s)	1994 result	
Name		Ideology	Leader(s)	Votes (%)	Seats
SPD	Social Democratic Party of Germany; Sozialdemokratische Partei Deutschlands	Social democracy	Manfred Stolpe	54.1%	52 / 88
CDU	Christian Democratic Union of Germany; Christlich Demokratische Union Deutschlands	Christian democracy	Jörg Schönbohm	18.7%	18 / 88
PDS	Party of Democratic Socialism; Partei des Demokratischen Sozialismus	Democratic socialism		18.7%	18 / 88

== Opinion polling ==
Polling firm	Fieldwork date	Sample size	SPD	CDU	PDS	Grüne	FDP	DVU	Others	Lead
1999 state election	5 Sep 1999	–	39.3	26.5	23.3	1.9	1.9	5.3	1.7	12.7
Infratest dimap	18–24 Aug 1999	1,000	44	23	23	2	1	5	2	21
dimap	2–11 Aug 1999	1,014	42	27	20	3	3	3	2	15
Forsa	August 1999	1,002	44	23	23	2	2	4	2	19
Infratest dimap	28 Jun–4 Jul 1999	1,000	42	29	20	3	1	–	5	13
dimap	18–22 Jun 1999	1,021	40	27	21	3	2	–	7	13
Infratest dimap	17–22 May 1999	1,000	50	25	18	3	1	–	3	25
Infratest dimap	15–21 Mar 1999	1,000	51	23	18	3	2	–	3	28
Infratest dimap	23–28 Nov 1998	1,000	55	18	18	4	3	–	4	37
Infratest dimap	21–29 Mar 1998	1,000	58	15	17	4	2	–	4	43
1994 state election	5 Sep 1994	–	54.1	18.7	18.7	2.9	2.2	–	3.1	35.4

== Election result ==
Summary of the 5 September 1999 election results for the Landtag of Brandenburg
Party	Votes	%	+/–	Seats	+/–
Social Democratic Party (SPD)	433,521	39.33	▼14.81	37	▼15
Christian Democratic Union	292,634	26.55	▲7.83	25	▲7
Party of Democratic Socialism	257,309	23.34	▲4.62	22	▲4
German People's Union (DVU)	58,247	5.28	▲5.28	5	▲5
Alliance 90/The Greens (Grüne)	21,410	1.94	▼0.95	0	Steady
Free Democratic Party (FDP)	20,472	1.86	▼0.34	0	Steady
Others	18,767	1.70		0	Steady
Total	1,102,360	100.00	–	89	–
Registered voters/turnout		54.3	▼2.0		

Popular Vote
SPD	39.33%
CDU	26.55%
PDS	23.34%
DVU	5.28%
B'90/GRÜNE	1.94%
FDP	1.86%
Other	1.70%

Landtag seats
SPD	41.57%
CDU	28.09%
PDS	24.72%
DVU	5.62%

== Sources ==
- The Federal Returning Officer
