= 2009 Brandenburg state election =

State election in Brandenburg, Germany

← 2004	27 September 2009	2014 →

All 88 seats in the Landtag of Brandenburg 45 seats needed for a majority
- Turnout: 1,388,722 (67.0%) ▲10.6%
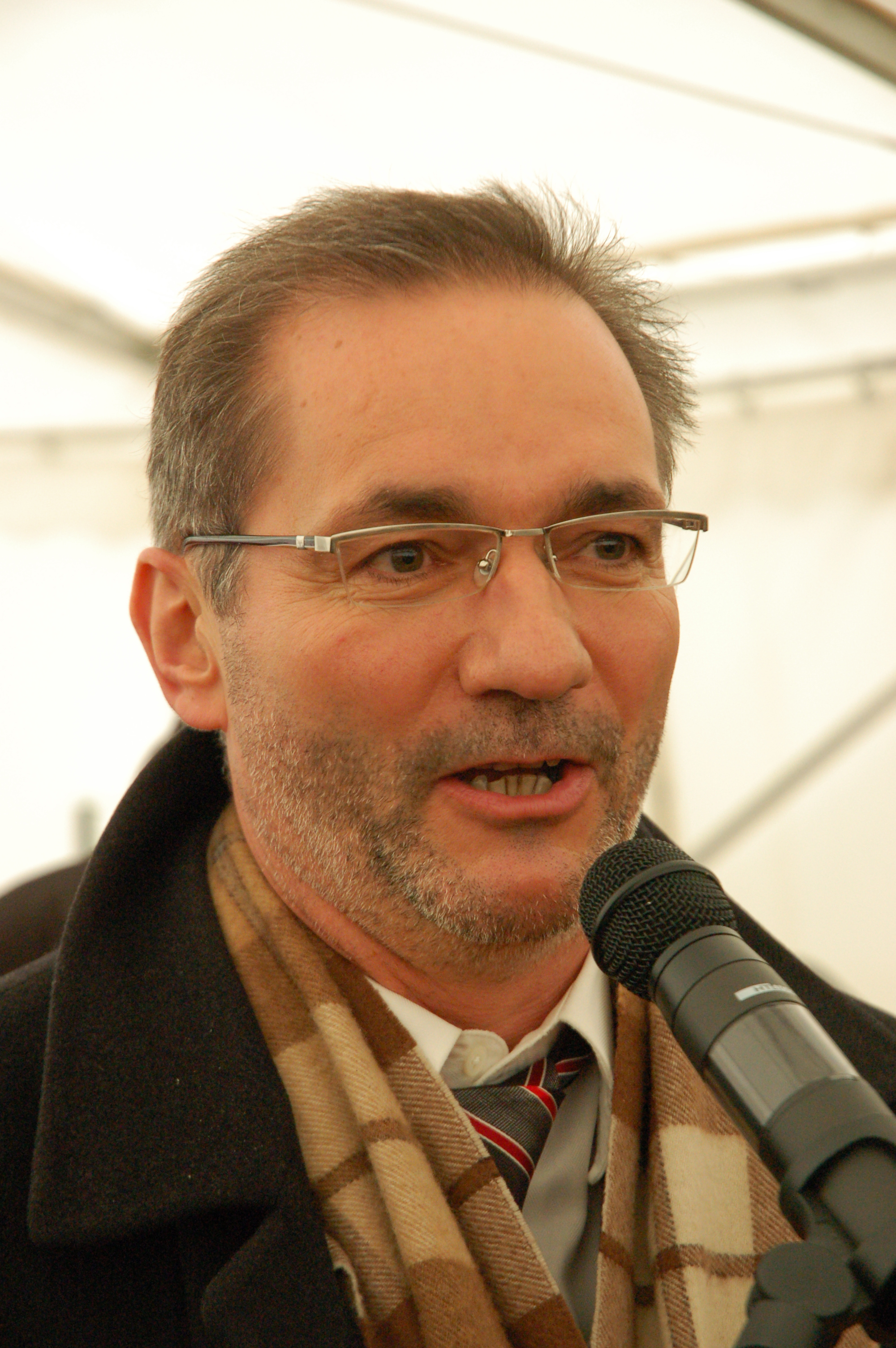

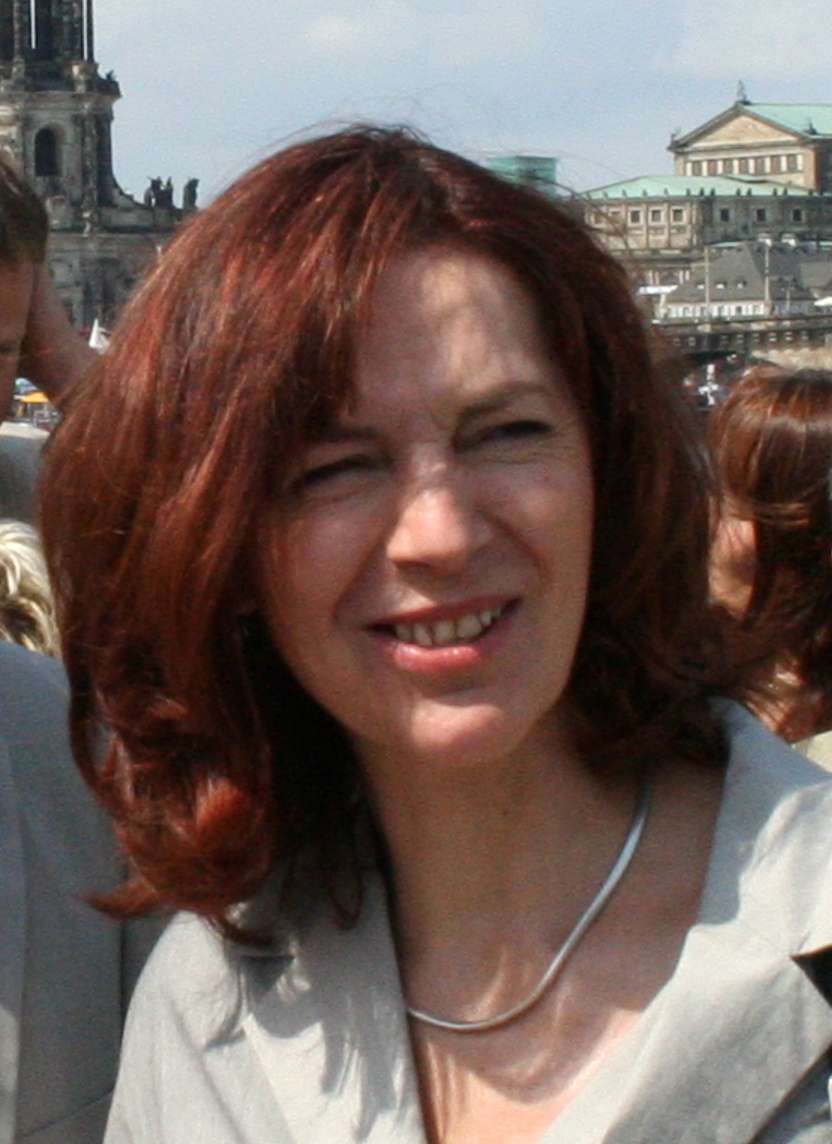

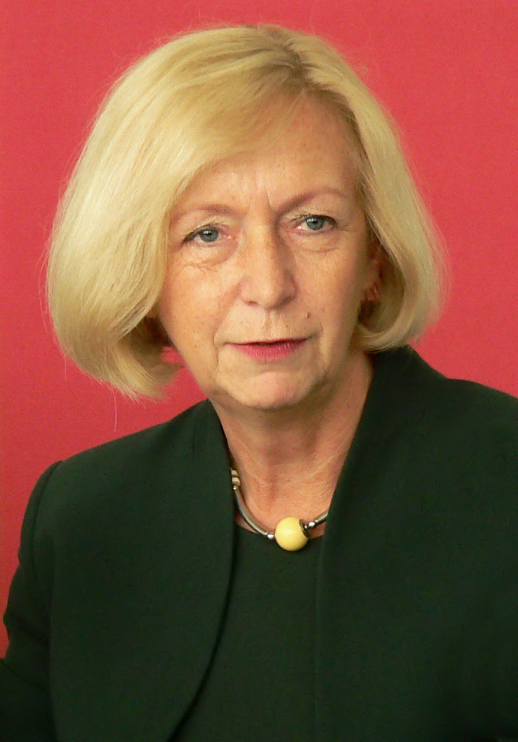

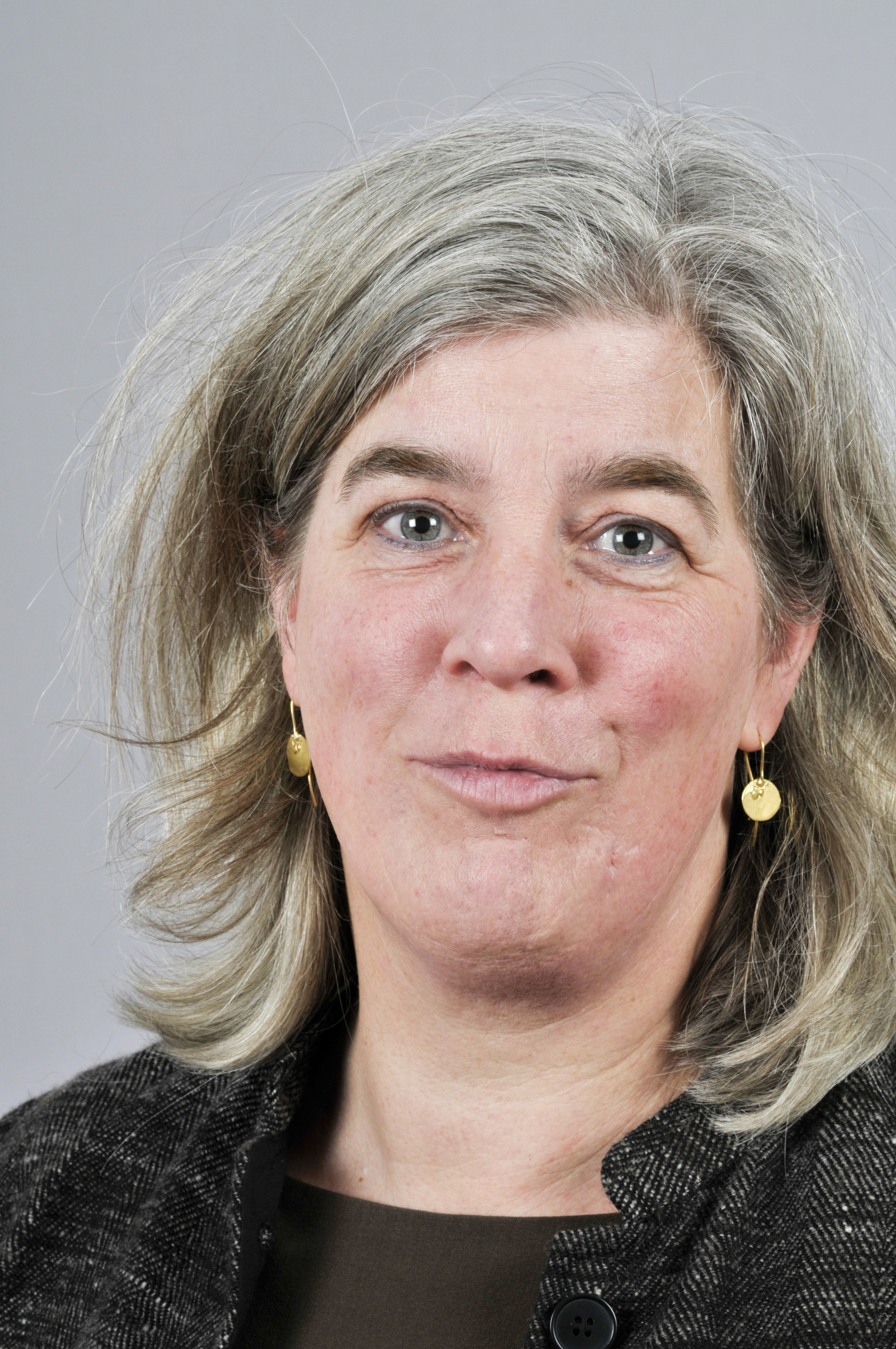

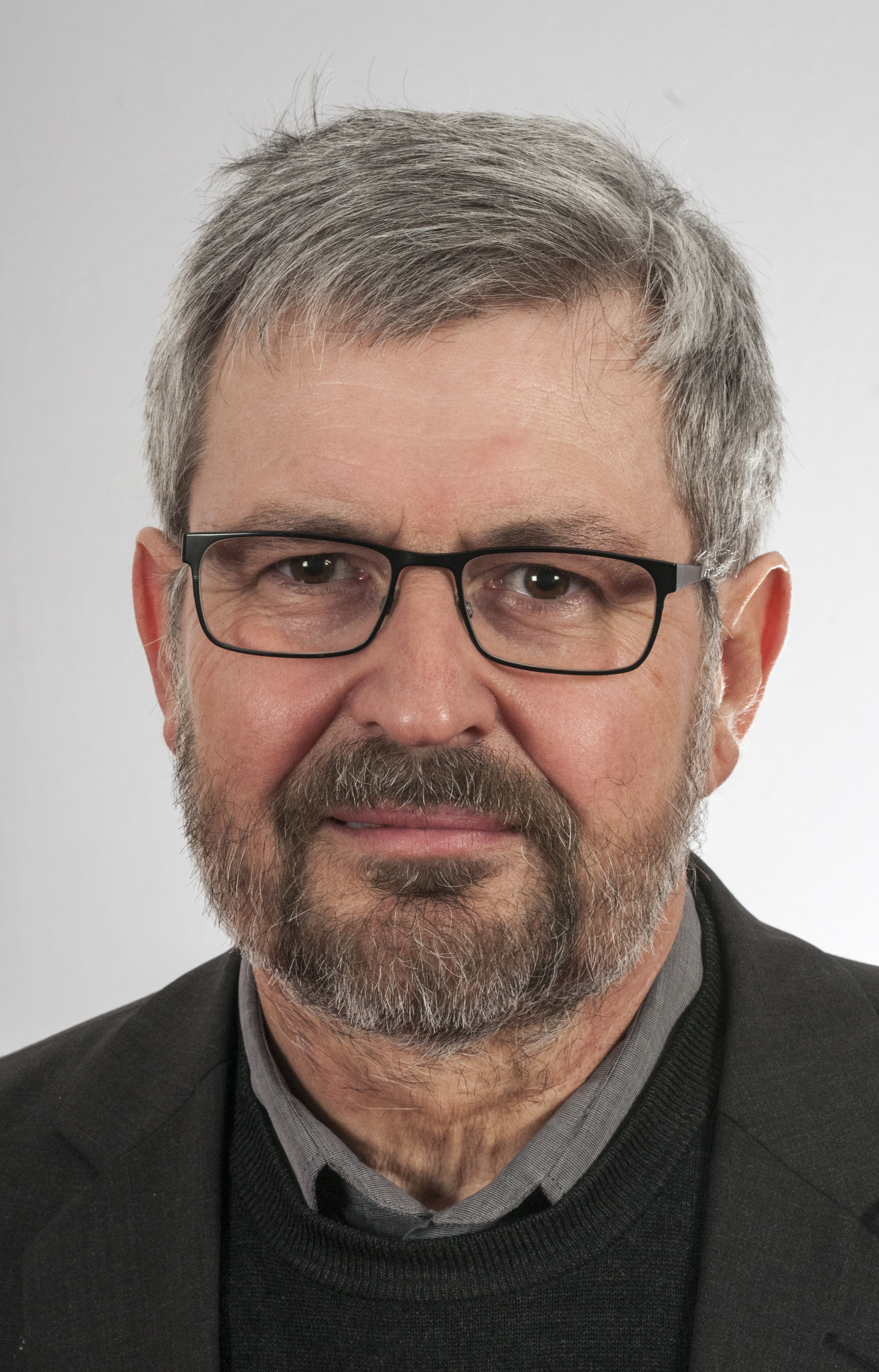
	First party	Second party	Third party
Leader	Matthias Platzeck	Kerstin Kaiser	Johanna Wanka
Party	SPD	Left	CDU
Leader's seat	Uckermark I	Märkisch-Oderland II	State-wide party list
Last election	33 seats, 31.9%	29 seats, 28.0%	20 seats, 19.4%
Seats won	31	26	19
Seat change	▼2	▼3	▼1
Popular vote	458,840	377,112	274,825
Percentage	33.0%	27.2%	19.8%
Swing	▲1.1%	▼0.8%	▲0.4%
	Fourth party	Fifth party	Sixth party
	FDP		DVU
Leader	Hans-Peter Goetz	Marie Luise von Halem & Axel Vogel	Liane Hesselbarth
Party	FDP	Greens	DVU
Leader's seat	State-wide party list	State-wide party list	State-wide party list (lost re-election)
Last election	0 seats, 3.3%	0 seats, 3.6%	6 seats, 6.1%
Seats won	7	5	0
Seat change	▲7	▲5	▼6
Popular vote	100,123	78,550	15,903
Percentage	7.2%	5.6%	1.1%
Swing	▲3.9%	▲2.1%	▼5.0%
- Results for the single-member constituencies
Government before election
Platzeck II
SPD–CDU
Elected Government
Platzeck III
SPD–The Left

The 2009 Brandenburg state election was held on 27 September 2009 to elect the members of the 5th Landtag of Brandenburg. It took place on the same day as the 2009 federal election and 2009 Schleswig-Holstein state election. The incumbent government of the Social Democratic Party (SPD) and Christian Democratic Union (CDU) led by Minister-President Matthias Platzeck took small losses, but retained a majority. However, the SPD chose to form a government with The Left rather than continue the SPD–CDU coalition.

The election saw the Free Democratic Party and The Greens re-enter the Landtag for the first time since the 1990 election, while the German People's Union lost all its seats.

== Parties ==
The table below lists parties represented in the 4th Landtag of Brandenburg.

Name		Ideology	Leader(s)	2004 result	
Name		Ideology	Leader(s)	Votes (%)	Seats
SPD	Social Democratic Party of Germany; Sozialdemokratische Partei Deutschlands	Social democracy	Matthias Platzeck	31.9%	33 / 88
Linke	The Left; Die Linke	Democratic socialism	Kerstin Kaiser	28.0%	29 / 88
CDU	Christian Democratic Union of Germany; Christlich Demokratische Union Deutschlands	Christian democracy	Johanna Wanka	19.4%	20 / 88
DVU	German People's Union; Deutsche Volksunion	German nationalism	Liane Hesselbarth	6.1%	6 / 88

== Opinion polling ==
Polling firm	Fieldwork date	Sample size	SPD	Linke	CDU	DVU/ NPD	FDP	Grüne	Others	Lead
2009 state election	27 Sep 2009	–	33.0	27.2	19.8	3.7 (Note: 2.6% NPD, 1.1% DVU)	7.2	5.6	6.1	5.8
Forschungsgruppe Wahlen	14–17 Sep 2009	1,000	32	27	22	–	7	5	7	5
Infratest dimap	14–15 Sep 2009	1,000	34	28	21	1	7	4	5	6
Infratest dimap	4–7 Sep 2009	1,001	31	28	22	4	8	4	3	3
Infratest dimap	7–10 May 2009	1,000	34	27	22	4	6	5	2	7
GESS	24–31 Mar 2009	1,003	34	25	21	4	7	5	4	9
Infratest	2–22 Feb 2009	1,000	35	26	22	–	6	5	6	9
Emnid	26 Jan–6 Feb 2009	1,001	36	26	21	3	7	5	2	10
Infratest dimap	11–14 Sep 2008	1,000	36	27	20	4	6	4	3	9
Forsa	1–15 Apr 2008	1,084	30	30	21	–	5	5	9	Tie
Infratest dimap	2–6 Apr 2008	1,000	35	30	21	–	5	5	4	5
Emnid	13–27 Feb 2008	~500	38	26	22	1	4	4	?	12
Infratest	21 Jan–7 Feb 2008	1,000	40	26	21	?	5	4	?	14
Emnid	3–15 Dec 2007	1,002	37	26	21	5	5	4	2	11
Infratest dimap	25–28 Oct 2007	1,000	40	24	23	3	4	4	2	16
Infratest dimap	8–13 Mar 2007	1,000	39	25	21	3	5	4	3	14
Infratest	26 Feb–4 Mar 2007	1,000	39	26	19	–	6	4	6	13
Infratest dimap	17–20 Nov 2006	1,000	40	23	21	5	6	3	2	17
Infratest dimap	28–30 May 2006	1,000	39	24	23	3	5	3	3	13
Forsa	7 Apr 2005	~1,000	37	25	18	–	4	4	12	12
Infratest	2–6 Dec 2005	752	39	27	21	–	4	4	5	12
Infratest dimap	11–15 Aug 2005	1,000	36	31	22	–	4	4	3	5
Infratest dimap	1–6 Jun 2005	1,000	34	23	29	–	4	5	5	5
2004 state election	19 Sep 2004	–	31.9	28.0	19.4	6.1	3.3	3.6	7.7	3.9

== Election result ==
Summary of the 27 September 2009 election results for the Landtag of Brandenburg
Party	Votes	%	+/–	Seats	+/–
Social Democratic Party (SPD)	458,840	33.04	▲1.13	31	▼2
The Left (Linke)	377,112	27.16	▼0.80	26	▼3
Christian Democratic Union (CDU)	274,825	19.79	▲0.36	19	▼1
Free Democratic Party (FDP)	100,123	7.21	▲3.88	7	▲7
Alliance 90/The Greens (Grüne)	78,550	5.66	▲2.06	5	▲6
National Democratic Party (NPD)	35,544	2.56	▲2.56	0	Steady
Free Voters (FW)	23,296	1.68	New	0	New
German People's Union (DVU)	15,903	1.15	▼4.93	0	▼6
Others	24,529	1.77		0	Steady
Total	1,388,722	100.00	–	88	–
Registered voters/turnout		67.0	▲10.6		
