= 2004 Brandenburg state election =

State election in Brandenburg, Germany

- 19 September 2004

All 88 seats in the Landtag of Brandenburg 45 seats needed for a majority
- Turnout: 1,168,909 (56.4%) ▲2.1%
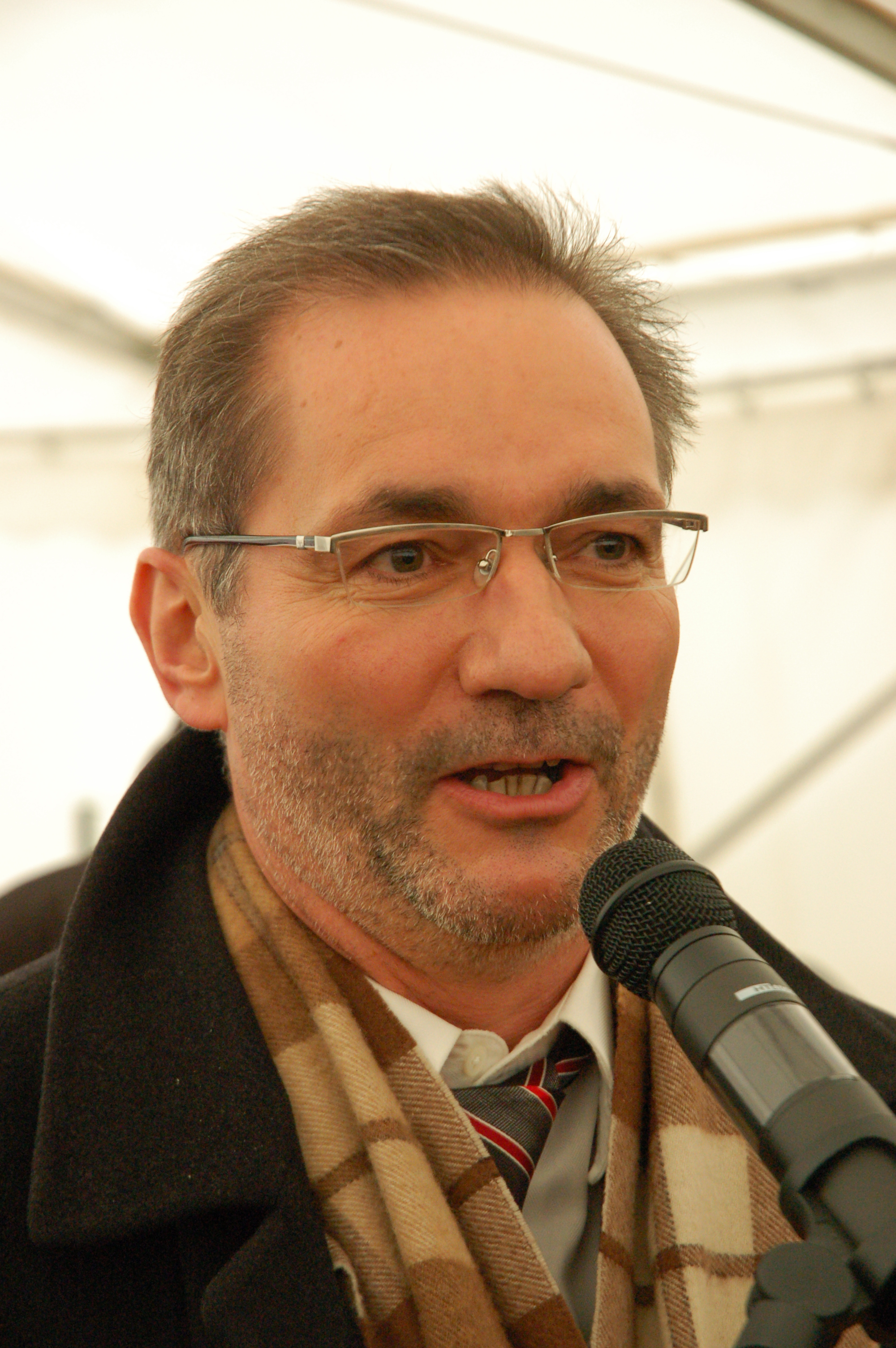

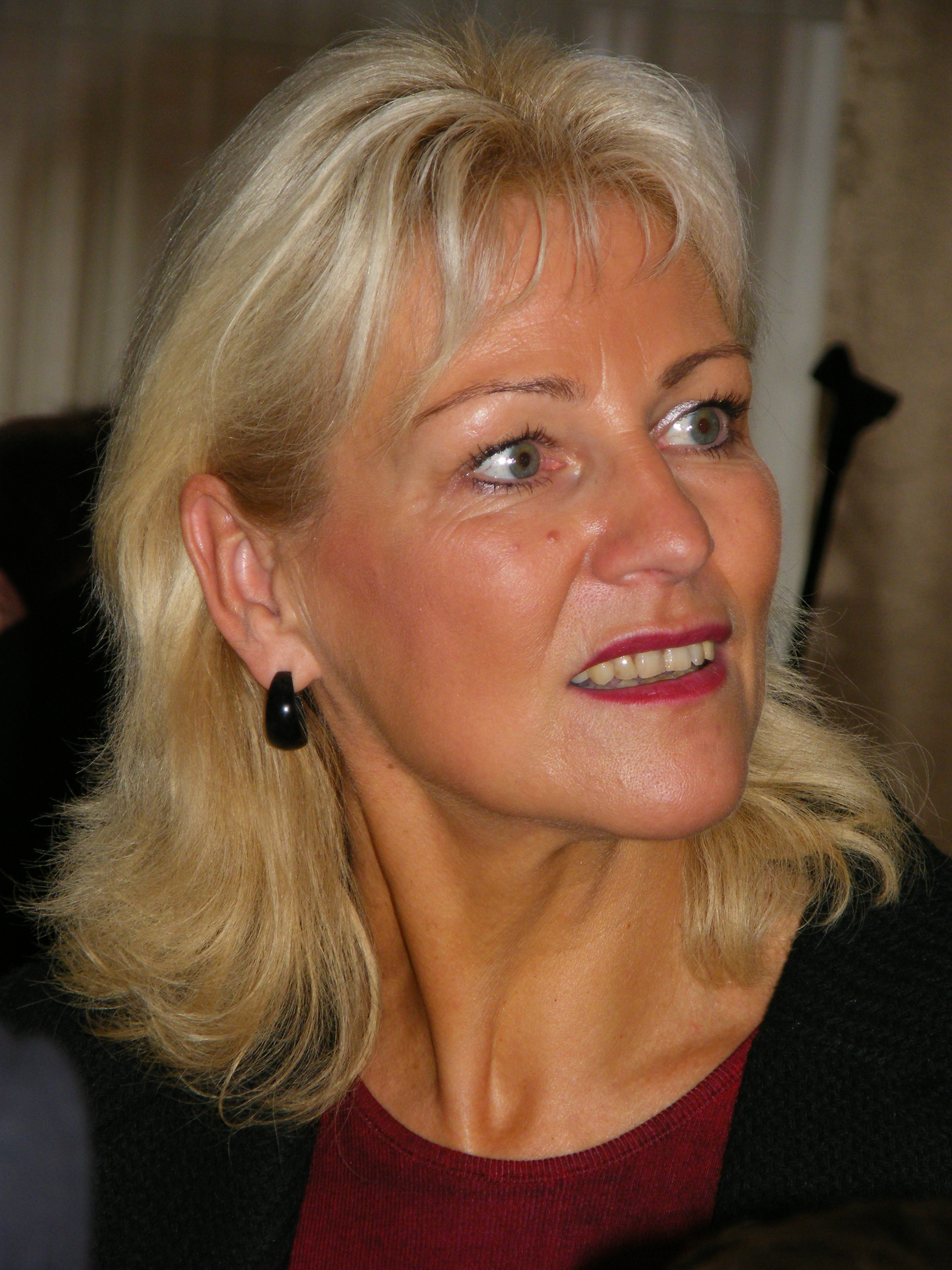

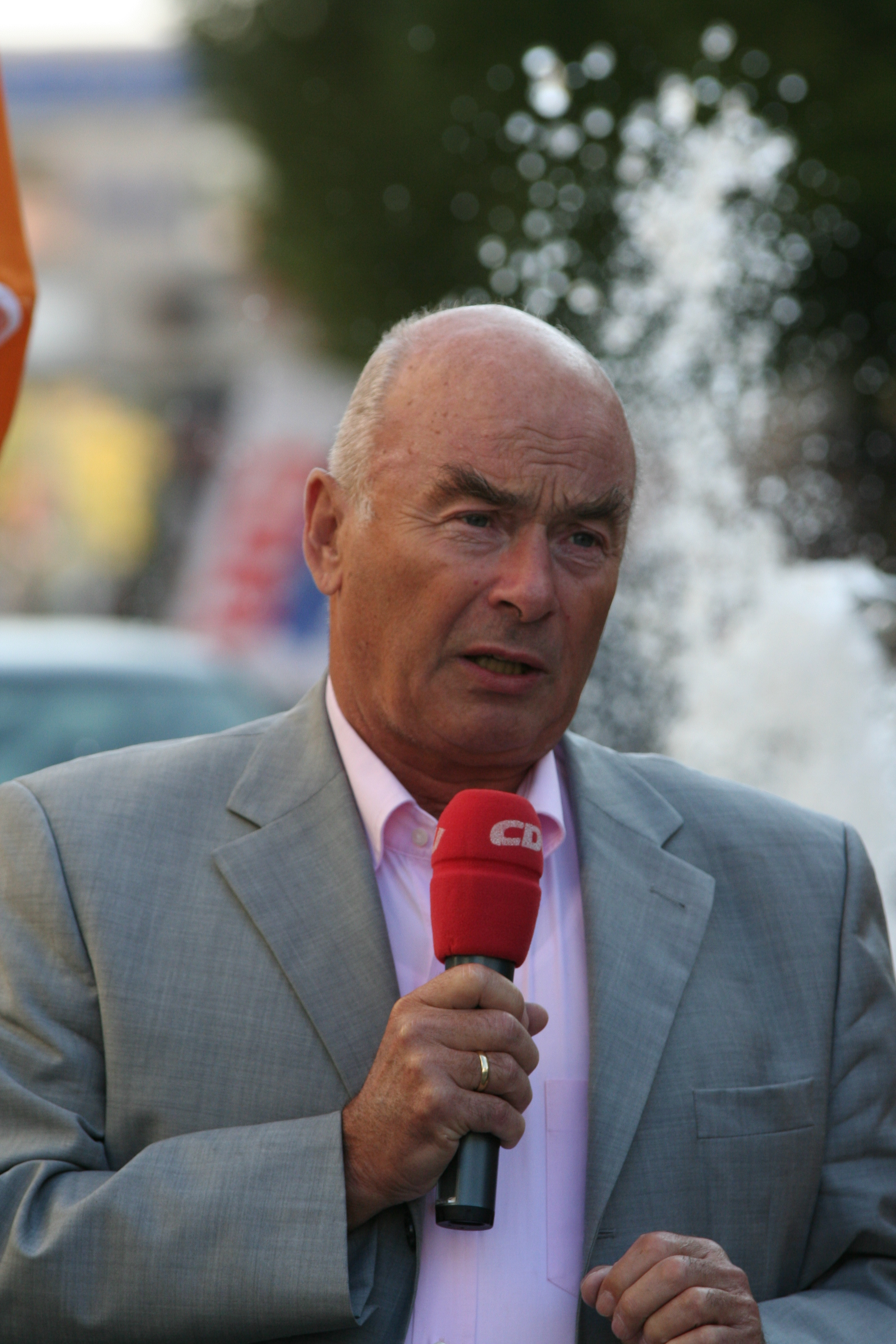
	First party	Second party
Leader	Matthias Platzeck	Dagmar Enkelmann
Party	SPD	PDS
Leader's seat	Potsdam II	Barnim II
Last election	37 seats, 39.3%	22 seats, 23.3%
Seats won	33	29
Seat change	▼4	▲7
Popular vote	372,942	326,801
Percentage	31.9%	28.0%
Swing	▼7.4%	▲4.7%
	Third party	Fourth party
		DVU
Leader	Jörg Schönbohm	Liane Hesselbarth
Party	CDU	DVU
Leader's seat	State-wide party list	State-wide party list
Last election	25 seats, 26.5%	5 seats, 5.3%
Seats won	20	6
Seat change	▼5	▲1
Popular vote	227,062	71,041
Percentage	19.4%	6.1%
Swing	▼7.1%	▲0.8%
- Results for the single-member constituencies
Government before election
Platzeck I (Note: Replaced Stolpe III cabinet in June 2002.)
SPD–CDU
Government after election
Platzeck II
SPD–CDU

The 2004 Brandenburg state election was held on 19 September 2004 to elect the members of the 4th Landtag of Brandenburg. The incumbent government of the Social Democratic Party (SPD) and Christian Democratic Union (CDU) led by Minister-President Matthias Platzeck was returned with a significantly reduced majority. The Party of Democratic Socialism (PDS) moved into second place, although polls prior to the election suggested it would become the largest party. The CDU fell to third place.

== Background ==
The SPD had suffered losses in several state elections before Brandenburg. This was thought to be a consequence of the Agenda 2010 policy, a series of economic liberal economic reforms adopted by the federal SPD government led by Chancellor Gerhard Schröder. Many voters in eastern Germany turned to the Party of Democratic Socialism (PDS), while many in the west later turned to Labour and Social Justice, an SPD splinter party. In state elections, the SPD's growing unpopularity had chiefly benefited the CDU.

In Brandenburg, both Minister-President Matthias Platzeck (SPD) and his partner Jörg Schönbohm (CDU) supported Schröder's reforms. Both PDS and the German People's Union (DVU), which had entered the Landtag in 1999, campaigned in opposition.

== Parties ==
The table below lists parties represented in the 3rd Landtag of Brandenburg.

Name		Ideology	Leader(s)	1999 result	
Name		Ideology	Leader(s)	Votes (%)	Seats
SPD	Social Democratic Party of Germany; Sozialdemokratische Partei Deutschlands	Social democracy	Matthias Platzeck	39.3%	37 / 89
CDU	Christian Democratic Union of Germany; Christlich Demokratische Union Deutschlands	Christian democracy	Jörg Schönbohm	26.5%	25 / 89
PDS	Party of Democratic Socialism; Partei des Demokratischen Sozialismus	Democratic socialism	Dagmar Enkelmann	23.3%	22 / 89
DVU	German People's Union; Deutsche Volksunion	German nationalism		5.3%	5 / 89

== Opinion polling ==
Polling firm	Fieldwork date	Sample size	SPD	CDU	PDS	DVU	Grüne	FDP	Others	Lead
2004 state election	19 Sep 2004	–	31.9	19.4	28.0	6.1	3.6	3.3	7.7	3.9
Forschungsgruppe Wahlen	6–9 Sep 2004	1,034	29	23	27	6	6	5	4	2
Infratest dimap	6–8 Sep 2004	1,000	27	24	31	5	5	4	4	4
Forsa	30 Aug–4 Sep 2004	1,003	28	23	35	4	4	2	4	7
Emnid	30 Aug–1 Sep 2004	751	29	25	31	3	5	4	3	2
Infratest	August 2004	1,000	28	22	34	3.5	5.5	4	3	6
Forsa	16–20 Aug 2004	1,009	27	22	36	4	4	3	4	9
Infratest dimap	5–9 Aug 2004	1,001	28	26	29	4	5	4	4	1
Forsa	29 Jul–5 Aug 2004	1,001	33	27	30	–	3	3	5	3
Usuma	June 2004	1,007	31	36	22	–	5	4	2	5
Forsa	May 2004	1,000	33	30	22	–	6	3	6	3
Infratest dimap	15–19 Mar 2004	1,001	30	34	20	–	5	5	6	4
Infratest dimap	15–20 Oct 2003	1,000	34	32	19	–	4	6	5	2
Infratest dimap	9–15 Jun 2003	1,000	34	34	17	–	6	5	4	Tie
Infratest dimap	6–9 Mar 2003	1,000	36	35	17	–	4	5	3	1
dimap	15 Dec 2002	?	34	36	20	–	4	2	4	2
Infratest dimap	28 Aug–1 Sep 2002	1,000	46	23	20	–	6	3	2	23
Infratest dimap	24–25 Jun 2002	1,000	40	29	21	–	2	6	2	11
Infratest dimap	24–28 Apr 2002	1,000	35	30	24	–	2	5	4	5
Forsa	March 2002	1,014	37	28	24	–	3	3	5	9
Infratest dimap	9–14 Oct 2001	1,000	44	26	21	–	2	3	4	18
Infratest dimap	April 2001	?	45	25	21	–	2	3	4	20
Infratest dimap	28 Aug–2 Sep 2000	1,000	44	25	21	–	3	3	4	19
Infratest dimap	25–29 Apr 2000	1,000	42	26	23	3	3	1	2	16
1999 state election	5 Sep 1999	–	39.3	26.5	23.3	5.3	1.9	1.9	1.7	12.7

== Election result ==
Summary of the 19 September 2004 election results for the Landtag of Brandenburg
Party	Votes	%	+/–	Seats	+/–
Social Democratic Party (SPD)	372,942	31.91	▼7.42	33	▼4
Party of Democratic Socialism (PDS)	326,801	27.96	▲4.62	29	▲7
Christian Democratic Union (CDU)	227,062	19.43	▼7.12	20	▼5
German People's Union (DVU)	71,041	6.08	▲0.80	6	▲1
Alliance 90/The Greens (Grüne)	42,091	3.60	▲1.72	0	Steady
Free Democratic Party (FDP)	38,890	3.33	▲1.47	0	Steady
Family Party (FAMILIE)	30,843	2.64	▲2.64	0	Steady
Others	59,239	5.07	▲3.37	0	Steady
Total	1,168,909	100.00	–	88	–
Registered voters/turnout		56.4	▲2.1		

Popular Vote
SPD	31.91%
PDS	27.96%
CDU	19.43%
DVU	6.08%
B'90/GRÜNE	3.60%
FDP	3.33%
FAMILIE	2.64%
Other	5.07%

Landtag seats
SPD	37.50%
PDS	32.95%
CDU	22.73%
DVU	6.82%

First vote	Second vote	First vote and Second vote

== Sources ==
- The Federal Returning Officer
