= Landtag of Brandenburg =

State legislature in Germany

Coordinates: 52°23′16″N 13°03′48″E

State Diet of Brandenburg Landtag Brandenburg Krajny sejm Bramborska

Type
- Type: Landtag
- Established: 1946

Leadership
- President: Ulrike Liedtke (SPD)

Structure
- Seats: 88
- Political groups: Government (46) SPD (34) CDU (12) Support (3) WfB (3) (Note: On 6 January 2026 André von Ossowski left the BSW Fraktion, after already having left the party on 11 November 2025. On 9 January, Melanie Matzes and Reinhard Simon also left the party and Fraktion, having previously also left on 11 November 2025 and subsequently rejoining.) Opposition (39) AfD (30) BSW (8) Independent (1)

Elections
- Last election: 22 September 2024
- Next election: 2029

Meeting place
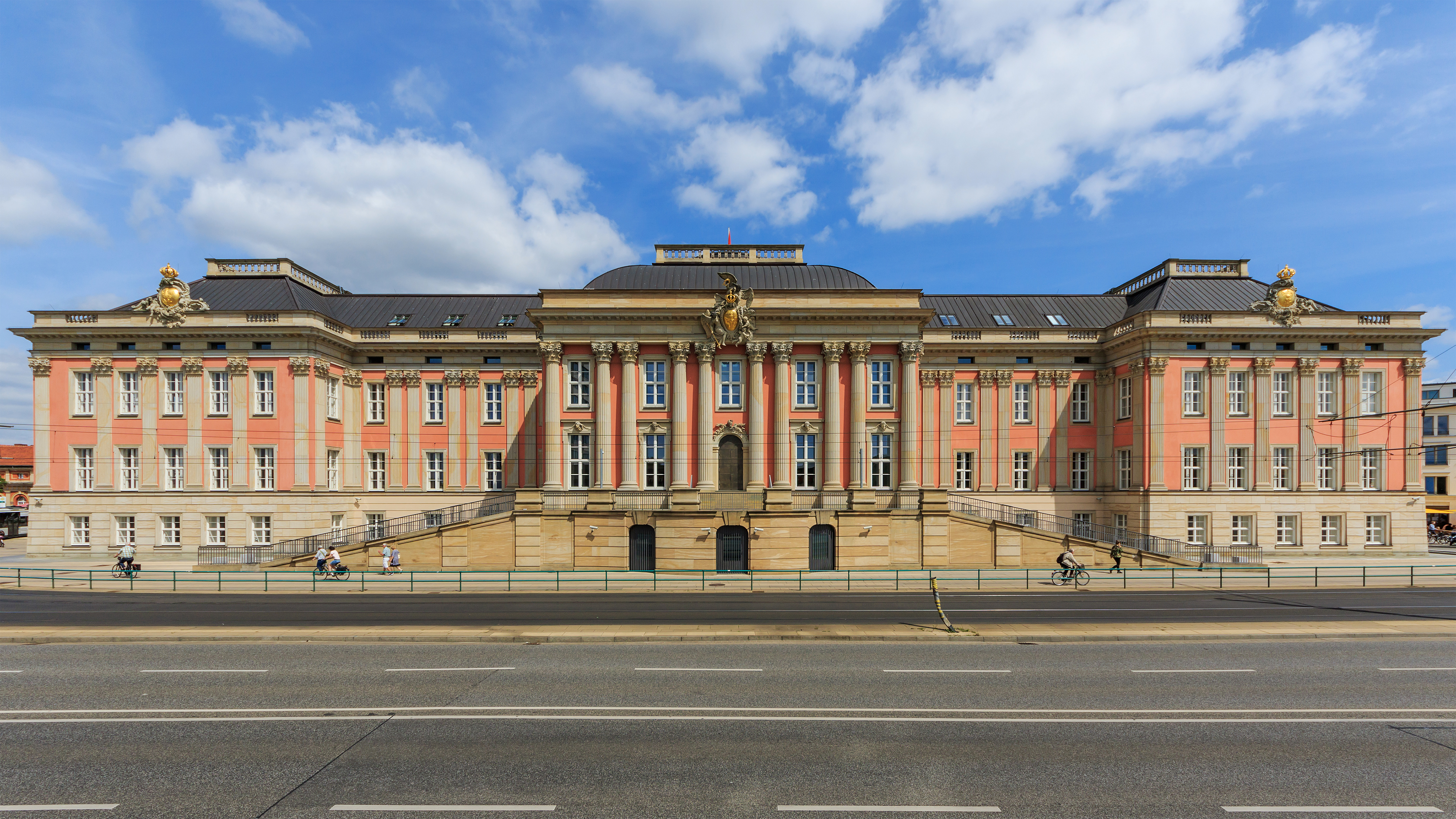
- City Palace, Potsdam

Website
- landtag.brandenburg.de

The Landtag of Brandenburg (Lower Sorbian: Krajny sejm Bramborska) is the unicameral legislature of the state of Brandenburg in Germany. Its 88 members of parliament are usually elected every 5 years.

It is responsible for deciding on state laws, controlling the state government and public administration, deciding on the budget and electing its presidium, state constitutional judges, the members of the state court of audit and the minister president.

On 22 September 2024, elections to the 7th Landtag were held. Only four political parties managed to obtain representation. The Social Democratic Party (SPD) barely maintained its position as the largest party in the Landtag with 32 seats, followed by Alternative for Germany (AfD) making gains with 30 seats, the Sahra Wagenknecht Alliance (BSW) with 14 seats, and Christian Democratic Union (CDU) with 12 seats. The state government has been a red–purple coalition between the SPD and the BSW.

Elections to the 1st Landtag of Brandenburg were held in 1946 in the Soviet Occupation Zone. The composition of the 2nd Landtag was determined before the 1950 election. This Landtag only continued to exist until 1952. It has existed in its current form since the recreation of the state of Brandenburg following reunification. Since the 1990 election the SPD has remained the largest party and participated in all state governments since and all minister presidents of the state to this day have been from the SPD. The office has been held by Dietmar Woidke since 28 August 2013.

== History ==
The Landtag of Brandenburg was established in 1946 and abolished in 1952. It was re-established in 1990. The seat of the Parliament is the reconstructed Potsdam City Palace since early 2014. Its former seat was the Military School building on the Brauhausberg, Potsdam, which dates from 1902.

== Elections ==
Elections to the Landtag use a hybrid system whereby the 44 electoral districts return one member each in first-past-the-post votes, and 44 seats are elected by party-list proportional representation. Every German citizen who has been habitually resident in Brandenburg for at least one month prior to the election is entitled to vote.

Each elector has two votes, one for the individual representative of their electoral district and the other for a party list. The proportionally allocated seats are distributed proportionally based on votes across the state to all parties or political unions on the list that received at least 5% of the vote in a constituency or who have won one or more directly elected seats.

Candidates are required to be over 18 years old, be a citizen of Germany and have lived in the state of Brandenburg for 3 months.

Elections are held every five years, on a Sunday or public holiday between 57 and 60 months after the start of the first legislative period after the previous election.

The most recent election was held on 22 September 2024 and the next elections will likely be held in 2029. The legislature may be dissolved sooner by a two thirds majority vote, if this happens new elections must be held within 70 days.

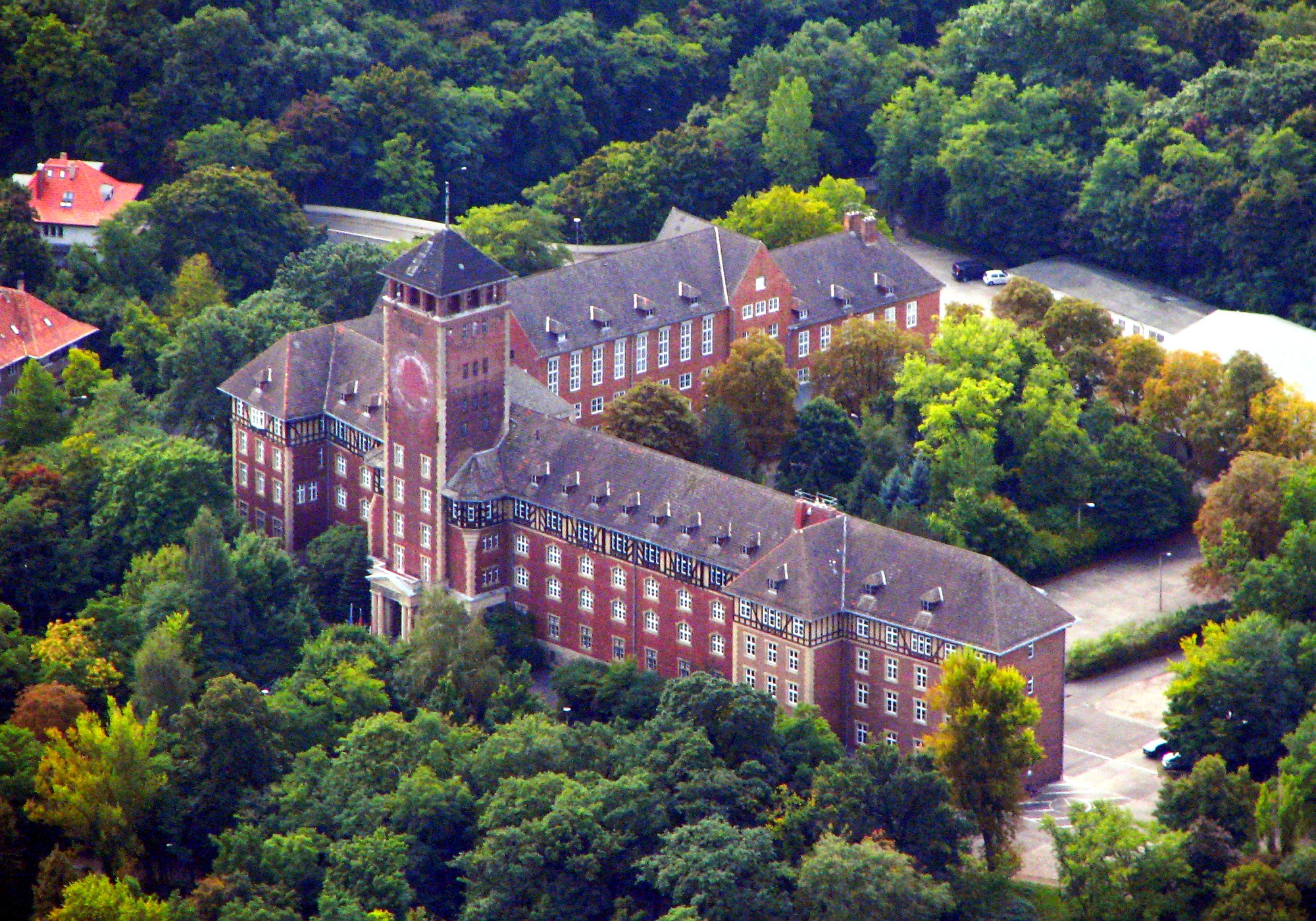
The seat of the Landtag of Brandenburg from 1991 to 2013, the former Royal Prussian military school in Potsdam

== Functions ==
=== Legislative ===
One of the functions of the Landtag is to pass state laws. Legislation can be proposed by the state government, MPs, the president of the Landtag, the presidium of the Landtag, parliamentary committees and their parliamentary groups, though it is usually the government that proposes new legislation. Proposed legislation can also be submitted through a popular initiative, assuming it is signed by at least 80,000 voting age Brandenburgian citizens. The Landtag is then obligated to treat this initiative just like it would one originating from the state government or its own members. If it fails to do this within two months a referendum is called.

Before being voted on, new legislation is subject to two readings. In the first reading a broad strokes debate regarding the proposal is held. Then it is transferred to one or more parliamentary committees. If multiple committees are involved, one of them largely holds responsibility. In the committees the proposal is reworked and a recommendation given. It is then subject to a second reading, where the proposal is discussed in detail and at the end of which the proposal is voted on. Until the second reading is complete, amendments can be proposed by parliamentary groups or individual members and are voted on be for the proposal is. Proposals are passed with a majority of the members present and voting. Constitutional amendments require a 2/3 majority to pass.

Proposals changing the text of the constitution and the budget are discussed in three readings. A third reading is also held if a parliamentary group or at least 1/5 of MPs request it. For laws to come into force they need to be signed by the president of the Landtag and published in the Gesetz- und Verordnungsblatt für das Land Brandenburg ('law and decree gazette for the state of Brandenburg').

=== Budgeting ===
Article 101 §3 of the state's constitution grants the Landtag of Brandenburg budgeting powers. According to constitution the budget can be set for one of more years. The budget is prepared by the state government setting the priorities for the next year (or years). The members of the Landtag function have a control function which has the character of a "general review of the work of the state government". They are tasked with checking, changing and approving the proposed budget. Every year the minister of finance reports to the Landtag the usage of funds along with state assets and debt. The entire budgetary and economic management of the state and its special assets and businesses are checked by the state court of audit.

=== Control functions ===
Additionally the Landtag is tasked with parliamentary control, i.e. the control of the activities of the government and the public administration. This control is implemented through checks, complaints and toleration of state action both after the fact and by formulating recommendations before the fact. Conflicts commonly occur between the government and the parliamentary groups supporting or opposing the government instead of the Landtag as a whole.

==== Right of members to speak and ask questions ====
There are various ways for the Landtag to control the state government and public administration. One of them is the right of MPs to speak and ask questions. Every representative has the right to speak and submit enquiries and law proposals in order to receive information on states of affaires the state government is responsible for handling. According to the state constitution the government is obligated to respond to enquiries immediately to the best of its knowledge and must give a complete answer which means that compared to the basic law and the other German states' constitutions information rights are stronger here. According to parliamentary procedure the right to answer questions includes major, minor, spoken and urgent enquiries. Major enquiries usually concern statewide problems or technical matters of superregional and particular political importance usually with the purpose of general political control of the government. Such an enquiry can be initiated by a parliamentary group or at least 1/5 of MPs. A written response must be given within three months. Minor enquiries usually concern specific events or specific policies by the government or public administration. They can be initiated by any MP in written form and must be responded to within four weeks.

Spoken and urgent enquiries have the purpose that representatives can demand statements by the government on specific issues in plenary meetings i.e. in the presence of the general public. Spoken enquiries can be initiated by any MP. Urgent enquiries can be initiated with after a shorter than usual waiting period and have the purpose of elucidating politically contentious issues. They must be approved by the president of the Landtag in accordance with the vice-presidents.

The state constitution requires the state government to inform the Landtag and parliamentary committees early and completely of the preparation of laws regarding specific issues. This includes laws and decrees regarding fundamental questions of regional and location planning and the implementation of major projects. This duty also extends to participation of the state in the Bundesrat and cooperation with the federal government, other German and sovereign states and the European Union.

==== Committee of inquiry ====
The Landtag has the right to install a committee of inquiry to elucidate matters of public interest. The Landtag must be informed of the results of the investigation in form of a final report. Additionally every member of the committee has the right to append the report with a dissenting opinion. In the third legislative period three committees of inquiry were established dealing with the Berlin Schönefeld Airport, the Landesentwicklungsgesellschaft (LEG) and Chipfabrik Frankfurt (Oder) respectively. The committee of inquiry 4/1 created by a resolution on 27 February 2008 investigated the land reform affaire uncovered in late 2007. On 26 April 2016 the Landtag installed a committee of inquiry (6/1) about the "organized far-right extremist violence and administrative action, especially regarding the National Socialist Underground (NSU)".

==== Commissions ====
===== Parliamentary control commission =====
In matters regarding constitutional protection the state government is subject to the control of the parliamentary control commission (PKK) which consists of at most 5 representatives. The opposition must be fairly represented on the commission. The state government must inform the PKK of the general activities of the office for constitutional protection, affaires of special importance along with isolated incidents. Additionally the PKK also has various information rights so it can get the information required for it to fulfill its control functions.

===== G10-commission =====
The G10-commission named after article 10 of the basic law is the final control institution. The G10-commission is tasked with checking the restrictions of the liberal democratic basic order ordered by the interior ministry. The interior ministry is required to inform the commission of such restrictions e.g. telephone tapping.

=== Electoral function ===
Another important function of the Landtag is the election of the minister president of the state of Brandenburg. In the lead-up to the inaugural meeting a potential governing coalition is usually agreed upon that can elect its candidate without a debate and on a secret ballot. Every representative has the right to propose a candidate. It is also possible for a person to be proposed who is not a member of the Landtag. If the proposed candidate does not get an absolute majority in the first round, a second vote is held. If they once again don't receive an absolute majority, a third round is held where a simple majority of representatives is enough. If a minister president is not elected within the three weeks after the inaugural meeting, the Landtag is automatically dissolved and reelections are held.

After the minister president has sworn their oath, they take control of government affairs and appoint the cabinet. The minister president forms a cabinet by handing the future ministers their certificate of appointment. They likewise swear an oath. During the allocation of portfolios, the setting of political focus of the respective partners plays a crucial role, because certain policy areas are associated with certain parties, leading to them desiring responsibility for the respective portfolios. The head of government (i.e. the minister president) sets the guidelines and answers to the Landtag regarding these guidelines. Within the confines set by the minister president, the ministers lead their ministries independently. In general, the minister president's term ends with the start of the new Landtag though it can also be cut short by a vote of no confidence.

The Landtag also elects the members of the state court of audit, the members of the state constitutional court, the 'state commissioner for data protection and the right of access to documents' along with the members of the G10-commission, the parliamentary control commission, the council for sorbian matters, the electoral committee for the election of judges (Richterwahlausschuss) in addition to the representatives of the Landtag in the state youth welfare committee and the broadcasting council of the RBB.

== Organization of representatives ==
=== Presidium ===
The president of the Landtag presides over and represents the Landtag. He is the highest representative of the state of Brandenburg and thus is the one who receives both foreign and national state guests. The Landtag elects the president of the Landtag from among its members during its first session. The largest parliamentary group has the right of proposal (article 69 §1 of the state constitution of Brandenburg). However the president is supposed to be neutral in the exercise of their duties including towards their own party group. The president can be removed with a 2/3 majority.

The president calls the meetings of both the Landtag and the presidium both of which they open, preside over and end. Meetings can also be called if 1/5 of members or the government requests it. In the Landtag the president exercises the domiciliary right and command over the police. Additionally the president approves topics of discussion in accordance with the rules of procedure, controls the printing and distribution of documents and accepts inquiries and proposals with have to be submitted to the president of the Landtag. In the legislative process a law only comes into force when it has been signed by the president. If the president of the Landtag is not present, their duties are performed by the vice-presidents. If they are also not present, the president of the Landtag is represented by a member of the presidium belonging to the largest parliamentary group. In the fifth legislative period Gunter Frisch (SPD) held the office, which he had also held during the fourth legislative period. The office of vice-president was held by Gerrit Große during the fifth legislative period from December 2009 onwards after Gerlinde Strobawa (They were both members of The Left) had resigned in November 2009. In the sixth legislative period the office of president of the landtag was held by Britta Stark (SPD) and the office of vice-president by Dieter Dombrowski (CDU). In the current seventh legislative period Ulrieke Liedtke (SPD) has been president of the Landtag since September 2019. The vice-presidents are Andreas Galau (AfD) and Barbara Richstein (CDU).

The remaining members of the presidium are elected in the constituting session like the president and vice-presidents. Each parliamentary group represented in the Landtag has the right to at least one member on the presidium. The presidium supports the president in the exercise of their duties, facilitates agreements between parliamentary groups and decides the schedule and agenda of plenary meetings. The members of the presidium can, like the president, be removed by a 2/3 majority.

== Current composition ==
The results of the 2024 Landtag elections were as follows:

SPD's and AfD's swing by district

The SPD secured a victory, increasing both its popular vote percentage and the amount of seats held. Nonetheless, the two largest populist parties – the left-wing BSW and the far-right AfD – earned significant results, combining for precisely half of all the seats in the legislature. The Greens, the Left and the BVB/Free Voters faced a complete defeat, losing all of their seats. Finally, the FDP fell to less than 1% of the vote.

Overall, the outgoing coalition between the SPD, the CDU and the Greens earned 47.1% of the vote in a decline compared to their combined total of 52.6% of the vote in the 2019 election.

Party	Party-list				Constituency				Total seats	+/–
Party	Votes	%	+/–	Seats	Votes	%	+/–	Seats	Total seats	+/–
Social Democratic Party	463,678	30.89	▲4.70	13	500,923	33.57	▲7.75	19	32	▲7
Alternative for Germany	438,811	29.23	▲5.72	5	470,412	31.52	▲9.37	25	30	▲7
Sahra Wagenknecht Alliance	202,343	13.48	New	14					14	New
Christian Democratic Union	181,632	12.10	▼3.47	12	238,247	15.97	▼1.49	0	12	▼3
Alliance 90/The Greens	62,031	4.13	▼6.65	0	51,373	3.44	▼6.86	0	0	▼10
The Left	44,692	2.98	▼7.74	0	77,123	5.17	▼7.01	0	0	▼10
BVB/Free Voters	38,596	2.57	▼2.48	0	104,722	7.02	▼0.19	0	0	▼5
Animal Protection Party	30,032	2.00	▼0.60	0	3,758	0.25	▲0.25	0	0	–
Plus Brandenburg	13,577	0.90	▼0.36	0	8,900	0.60	▲0.48	0	0	–
Free Democratic Party	12,462	0.83	▼3.25	0	20,389	1.37	▼2.28	0	0	–
German Rural Economy	6,619	0.44	New	0	4,536	0.30	New	0	0	–
Values Union	3,877	0.26	New	0					0	–
Third Way	1,810	0.12	New	0	756	0.05	New	0	0	–
German Communist Party	1,028	0.07	New	0	743	0.05	▲0.01	0	0	–
Grassroots Democratic Party					394	0.03	New	0	0	–
Democrats BB					800	0.05	New	0	0	–
Die PARTEI					222	0.01	▼0.51	–	0	–
Other					8,939	0.60		–	0	–
Total	1,501,188	100.00	–	44	1,492,237	100.00	–	44	88	–
Valid votes	1,501,188	99.18			1,492,237	98.59				
Invalid/blank votes	12,450	0.82			21,401	1.41				
Total votes	1,513,638	100.00			1,513,638	100.00				
Registered voters/turnout	2,076,953	72.88	▲11.55		2,076,953	72.88				
Source: Wahlen Brandenburg

SPD vote

AfD vote

BSW vote

CDU vote

Green vote

Linke vote

BVB-FW vote

Turnout

== Presidents of the Landtag of Brandenburg ==
Name	Period	Party
Friedrich Ebert (junior)	22 November 1946 – 1949	SED
Otto Meier	February 1949 – 1952	SED
Herbert Knoblich	26 October 1990 – 13 October 2004	SPD
Gunter Fritsch	13 October 2004 – 2014	SPD
Britta Stark	8 October 2014 – 2019	SPD
Ulrike Liedtke	25 September 2019 – present	SPD

== See also ==
- List of electoral districts in the Landtag of Brandenburg
- 1999 Brandenburg state election
- 2004 Brandenburg state election
- 2009 Brandenburg state election
- 2014 Brandenburg state election
- 2019 Brandenburg state election
- 2024 Brandenburg state election
