= Birgit Wöllert =

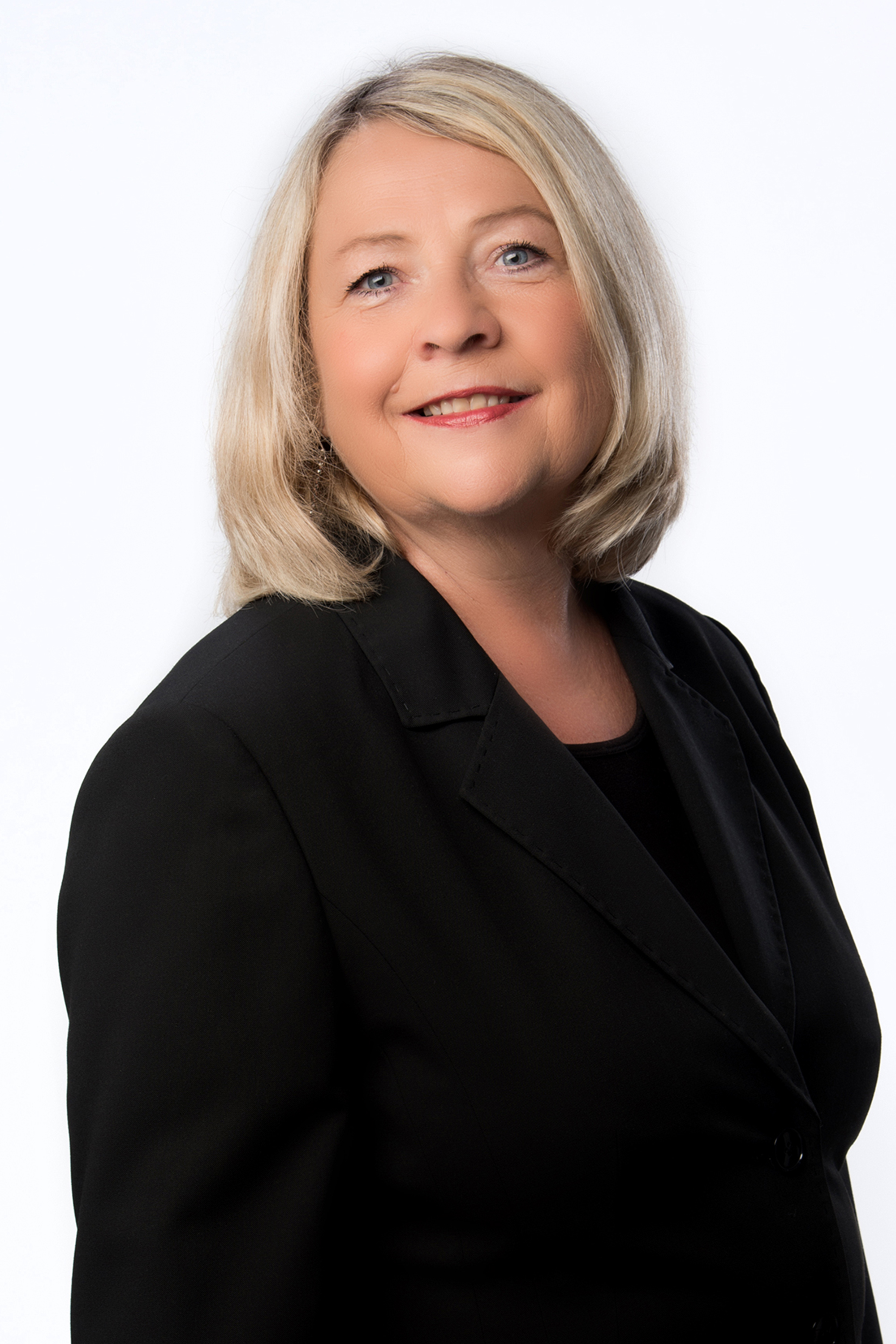
Wöllert in 2015

Birgit Ottilie Wöllert (born 1950) is a German politician of the Left Party (previously SED, PDS). A professional teacher, she served as a member of the Landtag of Brandenburg from 2004 to 2013 and of the Bundestag from 2013 to 2017.

== Early life, education and teaching career ==
Wöllert was born in Bendorf, RP on 15 December 1950. After attending a Polytechnic Secondary School from 1957 to 1967, she studied at an Institut für Lehrerbildung (Institute for Teacher Training - an institution in former East Germany) until 1971 and then worked as a teacher until 1979. From 1979 to 1982, she was head of the 'Haus der Pioniere' (lit. 'House of the Pioneers') in Spremberg, BB. In 1983, she returned to teaching (until 1987) and pursued further education at the Zwickau University of Education (Saxony) until 1985. She then worked as her schools deputy headmistress from 1987 to 1988 and served as the chief headmistress from 1989 to 1990 before returning to teaching once again from 1990 to 2004.

== Political work ==
Wöllert joined the Socialist Unity Party of East Germany in 1976, and after its abolition after the reunification of Germany, the Party of Democratic Socialism in 1989. The latter party is known as The Left since 2008. She was elected into the city council of Spremberg in 1990 and also the council of the Spree-Neiße district in 1998. From 2004 to 2013, she was a member of the Landtag of Brandenburg - receiving a seat in the state elections of 2004 and 2009. In the 2013 German Federal Election, she candidated in the Cottbus – Spree-Neiße electoral district, coming third with 24,681 (20%) votes, placing behind Ulrich Freese (SPD) (29,510; 23.9%) and Klaus-Peter Schulze (44,301; 35.9%). During her time as a member of the Bundestag, she was Chairwoman of the Health Committee and a full member of the Petitions Committee.

In 2017, she announced that she does not seek re-election for the Bundestag thus retires from National politics.
