= Cottbus – Spree-Neiße =

Federal electoral district of Germany

64 Cottbus – Spree-Neiße
- Electoral district for the Bundestag
- Cottbus – Spree-Neiße in 2025
- State: Brandenburg
- Population: 213,400 (2019)
- Electorate: 171,267 (2021)
- Major settlements: Cottbus; Spremberg
- Area: 1,822.6 km^{2}

Current electoral district
- Created: 1990
- Party: AfD
- Member: Lars Schieske
- Elected: 2025

Cottbus – Spree-Neiße is an electoral constituency (German: Wahlkreis) represented in the Bundestag. It elects one member via first-past-the-post voting. Under the current constituency numbering system, it is designated as constituency 64. It is located in southeastern Brandenburg, comprising the independent city of Cottbus and the district of Spree-Neiße.

Cottbus – Spree-Neiße was created for the inaugural 1990 federal election after German reunification. From 2021 to 2025, it was represented by Maja Wallstein of the Social Democratic Party (SPD). Since 2025 it has been represented by Lars Schieske of the AfD.

== Geography ==
Cottbus – Spree-Neiße is located in eastern Brandenburg. As of the 2021 federal election, it comprises the independent city of Cottbus and the district of Spree-Neiße.

== History ==
Cottbus – Spree-Neiße was created after German reunification in 1990, then known as Cottbus – Guben – Forst. It acquired its current name in the 2002 election. In the 1990 through 1998 elections, it was constituency 280 in the numbering system. In the 2002 and 2005 elections, it was number 64. In the 2009 election, it was number 65. Since the 2013 election, it has been number 64.

Originally, the constituency comprised the independent city of Cottbus and the districts of Guben and Forst. It acquired its current configuration and borders in the 2002 election.

| Election | No. | Name | Borders |
|---|---|---|---|
| 1990 | 280 | Cottbus – Guben – Forst | Cottbus city; Guben district; Forst district |
| 1994 | 280 | Cottbus – Guben – Forst | Cottbus city; Guben district; Forst district |
| 1998 | 280 | Cottbus – Guben – Forst | Cottbus city; Guben district; Forst district |
| 2002 | 64 | Cottbus – Spree-Neiße | Cottbus city; Spree-Neiße district |
| 2005 | 64 | Cottbus – Spree-Neiße | Cottbus city; Spree-Neiße district |
| 2009 | 65 | Cottbus – Spree-Neiße | Cottbus city; Spree-Neiße district |
| 2013 | 64 | Cottbus – Spree-Neiße | Cottbus city; Spree-Neiße district |
| 2017 | 64 | Cottbus – Spree-Neiße | Cottbus city; Spree-Neiße district |
| 2021 | 64 | Cottbus – Spree-Neiße | Cottbus city; Spree-Neiße district |
| 2025 | 64 | Cottbus – Spree-Neiße | Cottbus city; Spree-Neiße district |

== Members ==
The constituency was first represented by Michael Wonneberger of the Christian Democratic Union (CDU) from 1990 to 1994. Werner Labsch of the Social Democratic Party (SPD) was elected in 1994 and served until 2002, followed by Wilfried Schreck from 2002 to 2005 and Steffen Reiche from 2005 to 2009. Wolfgang Nešković of The Left won the constituency in 2009. After leaving the party and becoming an independent in 2012, he was defeated seeking re-election in 2013. Klaus-Peter Schulze of the CDU was elected in 2013. Maja Wallstein regained the constituency for the SPD in 2021.

| Election | Member | Party | % |
|---|---|---|---|
| 1990 | Michael Wonneberger | CDU | 40.2 |
| 1994 | Werner Labsch | SPD | 41.5 |
| 1998 | Werner Labsch | SPD | 43.5 |
| 2002 | Wilfried Schreck | SPD | 43.4 |
| 2005 | Steffen Reiche | SPD | 37.6 |
| 2009 | Wolfgang Nešković (Note: Nešković was elected for The Left, but left the party in December 2012.) | LINKE | 30.0 |
| 2009 | Wolfgang Nešković | Ind. | 30.0 |
| 2013 | Klaus-Peter Schulze | CDU | 36.0 |
| 2017 | Klaus-Peter Schulze | CDU | 28.4 |
| 2021 | Maja Wallstein | SPD | 27.6 |
| 2025 | Lars Schieske | AfD | 42.0 |

== Election results ==
=== 2025 election ===
Federal election (2025): Cottbus – Spree-Neiße
| Notes: | Blue background denotes the winner of the electorate vote. Pink background denotes a candidate elected from their party list. Yellow background denotes an electorate win by a list member, or other incumbent. A ✓ or ✗ denotes status of any incumbent, win or lose respectively. | | | | | | |
| Party | Candidate | Votes | % | ±% | Party votes | % | ±% |
|---|---|---|---|---|---|---|---|
| AfD | Lars Schieske | 54,981 | 42.0 | ▲16.3 | 51,313 | 39.1 | ▲14.8 |
| SPD | ✗ Maja Wallstein | 30,548 | 23.3 | ▼4.3 | 18,348 | 14.0 | ▼14.6 |
| CDU | Michael Rabes | 22,712 | 17.3 | ▲0.7 | 20,932 | 15.9 | ▲2.1 |
| BSW | | | | | 15,050 | 11.5 | New |
| Left | Christian Görke | 12,819 | 9.8 | ▲1.0 | 12,144 | 9.2 | ▲1.6 |
| Greens | | | | | 5,275 | 4.0 | ▼1.5 |
| FDP | Robert Kellner | 3,559 | 2.7 | ▼6.3 | 4,249 | 3.2 | ▼7.5 |
| FW | Carsten Kepsch | 2,882 | 2.2 | ▼0.5 | 1,614 | 1.2 | ▼1.0 |
| PARTEI | Robert Hanschke | 2,257 | 1.7 | ▼0.6 | 1,235 | 0.9 | ▼0.3 |
| Volt | Florian Thiemann | 1,150 | 0.9 | New | 742 | 0.6 | ▲0.3 |
| BD | | | | | 408 | 0.3 | New |
| MLPD | | | | | 92 | 0.1 | 0.0 |
| Informal votes | | 1,470 | | | 976 | | |
| Total valid votes | | 130,908 | | | 131,402 | | |
| Turnout | | 132,378 | 79.8 | ▲4.8 | | | |
| AfD gain from SPD | Majority | 24,433 | 18.7 | N/A | | | |

=== 2021 election ===
Federal election (2021): Cottbus – Spree-Neiße
| Notes: | Blue background denotes the winner of the electorate vote. Pink background denotes a candidate elected from their party list. Yellow background denotes an electorate win by a list member, or other incumbent. A ✓ or ✗ denotes status of any incumbent, win or lose respectively. | | | | | | |
| Party | Candidate | Votes | % | ±% | Party votes | % | ±% |
|---|---|---|---|---|---|---|---|
| SPD | Maja Wallstein | 34,882 | 27.6 | ▲10.6 | 36,098 | 28.5 | ▲13.4 |
| AfD | Daniel Münschke | 32,530 | 25.7 | ▲0.5 | 30,729 | 24.3 | ▼2.6 |
| CDU | Markus Niggemann | 21,072 | 16.7 | ▼11.7 | 17,502 | 13.8 | ▼10.3 |
| FDP | Laura Schieritz | 11,400 | 9.0 | ▲3.3 | 13,603 | 10.7 | ▲3.1 |
| Left | Christian Görke | 11,156 | 8.8 | ▼6.9 | 9,670 | 7.6 | ▼8.9 |
| Greens | Heide Schinowsky | 4,662 | 3.7 | ▲0.4 | 6,939 | 5.5 | ▲2.3 |
| FW | Andreas Richter | 3,375 | 2.7 | | 2,818 | 2.2 | ▲1.4 |
| Tierschutzpartei | | | | | 2,516 | 2.0 | ▲0.1 |
| PARTEI | Michael Matschke | 2,943 | 2.3 | ▼0.1 | 1,593 | 1.3 | ▼0.2 |
| dieBasis | Lysann Kobbe | 2,779 | 2.2 | | 2,212 | 1.7 | |
| Unabhängige | Ingo Weidelt | 1,140 | 0.9 | | 899 | 0.7 | |
| NPD | | | | | 423 | 0.3 | ▼0.8 |
| Pirates | | | | | 392 | 0.3 | |
| Volt | | | | | 347 | 0.3 | |
| Team Todenhöfer | | | | | 276 | 0.2 | |
| DKP | Gisela Vierrath | 424 | 0.3 | ▼0.1 | 218 | 0.2 | ▼0.1 |
| Humanists | | | | | 128 | 0.1 | |
| ÖDP | | | | | 123 | 0.1 | ▼0.1 |
| MLPD | | | | | 79 | 0.1 | 0.0 |
| Informal votes | | 1,960 | | | 1,768 | | |
| Total valid votes | | 126,363 | | | 126,555 | | |
| Turnout | | 128,323 | 74.9 | ▲1.0 | | | |
| SPD gain from CDU | Majority | 2,352 | 1.9 | | | | |

=== 2017 election ===
Federal election (2017): Cottbus – Spree-Neiße
| Notes: | Blue background denotes the winner of the electorate vote. Pink background denotes a candidate elected from their party list. Yellow background denotes an electorate win by a list member, or other incumbent. A ✓ or ✗ denotes status of any incumbent, win or lose respectively. | | | | | | |
| Party | Candidate | Votes | % | ±% | Party votes | % | ±% |
|---|---|---|---|---|---|---|---|
| CDU | ✓ Klaus-Peter Schulze | 36,855 | 28.4 | ▼7.5 | 31,366 | 24.1 | ▼11.6 |
| AfD | Marianne Spring-Räumschüssel | 32,776 | 25.3 | | 34,905 | 26.8 | ▲19.9 |
| SPD | Ulrich Freese | 22,019 | 17.0 | ▼7.0 | 19,729 | 15.2 | ▼6.5 |
| Left | Birgit Kaufhold | 20,359 | 15.7 | ▼4.3 | 21,456 | 16.5 | ▼6.1 |
| FDP | Jeff Staudacher | 7,426 | 5.7 | ▲3.7 | 9,941 | 7.6 | ▲5.2 |
| Greens | Wolfgang Renner | 4,319 | 3.3 | ▲0.7 | 4,093 | 3.1 | ▼0.4 |
| PARTEI | Torsten Mack | 3,212 | 2.5 | ▲1.7 | 1,898 | 1.5 | |
| Tierschutzpartei | | | | | 2,401 | 1.8 | |
| Independent | Helmut Fleischhauer | 2,256 | 1.7 | | | | |
| NPD | | | | | 1,437 | 1.1 | ▼2.0 |
| FW | | | | | 1,106 | 0.9 | ▼0.2 |
| BGE | | | | | 584 | 0.4 | |
| DKP | Gisela Vierrath | 501 | 0.4 | ▲0.2 | 296 | 0.2 | |
| DM | | | | | 488 | 0.4 | |
| ÖDP | | | | | 204 | 0.2 | |
| MLPD | | | | | 124 | 0.1 | 0.0 |
| Informal votes | | 2,390 | | | 2,085 | | |
| Total valid votes | | 129,723 | | | 130,028 | | |
| Turnout | | 132,113 | 73.9 | ▲6.7 | | | |
| CDU hold | Majority | 4,079 | 3.1 | ▼8.9 | | | |

=== 2013 election ===
Federal election (2013): Cottbus – Spree-Neiße
| Notes: | Blue background denotes the winner of the electorate vote. Pink background denotes a candidate elected from their party list. Yellow background denotes an electorate win by a list member, or other incumbent. A ✓ or ✗ denotes status of any incumbent, win or lose respectively. | | | | | | |
| Party | Candidate | Votes | % | ±% | Party votes | % | ±% |
|---|---|---|---|---|---|---|---|
| CDU | Klaus-Peter Schulze | 44,301 | 35.9 | ▲11.9 | 44,230 | 35.8 | ▲11.4 |
| SPD | Ulrich Freese | 29,510 | 23.9 | ▼3.9 | 26,863 | 21.7 | ▼2.4 |
| Left | Birgit Wöllert | 24,681 | 20.0 | ▼10.0 | 27,965 | 22.6 | ▼6.7 |
| Independent | ✗ Wolfgang Nešković | 9,999 | 8.1 | | | | |
| AfD | | | | | 8,555 | 6.9 | |
| NPD | Ronny Zasowk | 4,929 | 4.0 | ▲0.1 | 3,897 | 3.2 | ▲0.1 |
| Greens | Wolfgang Renner | 3,278 | 2.7 | ▼1.9 | 4,382 | 3.5 | ▼1.3 |
| Pirates | Sascha Kahle | 2,889 | 2.3 | | 2,615 | 2.1 | ▼0.8 |
| FDP | Martin Neumann | 2,498 | 2.0 | ▼6.7 | 2,984 | 2.4 | ▼6.6 |
| FW | | | | | 1,355 | 1.1 | |
| PARTEI | | | | | 901 | 0.7 | |
| PRO | | | | | 525 | 0.4 | |
| DKP | Sebastian Zachow-Vierrath | 245 | 0.2 | | | | |
| REP | | | | | 204 | 0.2 | ▼0.1 |
| MLPD | | | | | 138 | 0.1 | 0.0 |
| Informal votes | | 2,689 | | | 2,207 | | |
| Total valid votes | | 123,231 | | | 123,713 | | |
| Turnout | | 125,920 | 67.3 | ▲2.0 | | | |
| CDU gain from Left | Majority | 14,791 | 12.0 | | | | |

=== 2009 election ===
Federal election (2009): Cottbus – Spree-Neiße
| Notes: | Blue background denotes the winner of the electorate vote. Pink background denotes a candidate elected from their party list. Yellow background denotes an electorate win by a list member, or other incumbent. A ✓ or ✗ denotes status of any incumbent, win or lose respectively. | | | | | | |
| Party | Candidate | Votes | % | ±% | Party votes | % | ±% |
|---|---|---|---|---|---|---|---|
| Left | Wolfgang Nešković | 37,224 | 30.0 | ▲2.8 | 36,561 | 29.3 | ▲1.8 |
| SPD | ✗ Steffen Reiche | 34,529 | 27.9 | ▼9.8 | 29,999 | 24.1 | ▼11.8 |
| CDU | Mario Laurischk | 29,829 | 24.1 | ▲2.1 | 30,360 | 24.4 | ▲4.4 |
| FDP | Martin Neumann | 10,878 | 8.8 | ▲3.2 | 11,230 | 9.0 | ▲2.1 |
| Greens | Matthias Fobo | 5,650 | 4.6 | ▲1.8 | 6,093 | 4.9 | ▲0.6 |
| NPD | Ronny Zasowk | 4,806 | 3.9 | ▲0.4 | 3,765 | 3.0 | ▼0.4 |
| Pirates | | | | | 3,636 | 2.9 | |
| DVU | | | | | 1,169 | 0.9 | |
| FWD | | | | | 1,055 | 0.8 | |
| REP | | | | | 344 | 0.3 | |
| BüSo | | | | | 258 | 0.2 | |
| MLPD | | | | | 179 | 0.1 | ▼0.1 |
| Informal votes | | 4,218 | | | 3,530 | | |
| Total valid votes | | 123,961 | | | 124,649 | | |
| Turnout | | 128,179 | 65.3 | ▼8.1 | | | |
| Left gain from SPD | Majority | 2,695 | 2.1 | | | | |

=== 2005 election ===
Federal election (2005):Frankfurt (Oder) – Oder-Spree
| Notes: | Blue background denotes the winner of the electorate vote. Pink background denotes a candidate elected from their party list. Yellow background denotes an electorate win by a list member, or other incumbent. A ✓ or ✗ denotes status of any incumbent, win or lose respectively. | | | | | | |
| Party | Candidate | Votes | % | ±% | Party votes | % | ±% |
|---|---|---|---|---|---|---|---|
| SPD | Steffen Reiche | 55,310 | 37.6 | ▼5.8 | 52,699 | 35.9 | ▼12.7 |
| Left | Andreas Trunschke | 39,877 | 27.2 | ▲7.1 | 40,410 | 27.5 | ▲11.0 |
| CDU | Gabriela Arzt | 32,147 | 22.0 | ▼1.1 | 29,234 | 19.9 | ▼2.6 |
| FDP | Martin Neumann | 8,128 | 5.6 | ▼3.1 | 10,193 | 6.9 | ▲1.3 |
| NPD | Jens Kramp | 5,116 | 3.5 | | 5,049 | 3.4 | ▲2.0 |
| Greens | Cornelia Behm | 4,111 | 2.8 | ▼0.2 | 6,302 | 4.3 | ▲1.2 |
| GRAUEN | | | | | 1,528 | 1.0 | ▲0.3 |
| Independent | Rudi Milius | 1,238 | 0.8 | | | | |
| 50Plus The Generation-Alliance | | | | | 931 | 0.6 | |
| Independent | Michael Welzel | 701 | 0.5 | | | | |
| MLPD | | | | | 404 | 0.3 | |
| Informal votes | | 2,653 | | | 2,331 | | |
| Total valid votes | | 146,428 | | | 146,750 | | |
| Turnout | | 149,081 | 73.4 | ▲0.6 | | | |
| SPD hold | Majority | 15,233 | 10.4 | | | | |
