= Schieske =

Schieske is a surname. Notable people with the name include:

- Alfred Schieske (1908–1970), German actor
- Lars Schieske (born 1977), German politician
