= German News Information Services GmbH =

German News Information Services GmbH is a German "left and critical" news platform of "independent scientists and journalists". Its task is the description of the "hegemonial tactics and strategies of the united Germany."

== General ==
The news portal was founded in 2002. It publishes an analysis on German foreign policy from Monday to Friday. The texts are in German but are translated into English. They used to be translated into French and Polish.

The chief editors are Horst Teubert and Andreas Plake. Jörg Kronauer is responsible for the documentary part. The advisory board's members are: Karl-Heinz Roth, Wolfgang Popp, Wolfgang Dreßen, Susanne Schunter-Kleemann and Martin Bennhold. Another contributor is David X. Noack.

Interviews with German politicians and authors such as Hans-Christian Ströbele, Erich Schmidt-Eenboom, Wolfgang Neskovic, Sabine Leutheusser-Schnarrenberger and Max Stadler, are frequently conducted.

== Relevance and reference ==
On multiple occasions the Russian state news agency RIA Novosti, the left-wing German newspaper Junge Welt, the German website Heise Online and the Swiss right-wing and conspirationalist weekly newspaper Zeit-Fragen have referred to www.german-foreign-policy.com.

== Tibet 2008 ==
In 2008, Xinhua, the Chinese state media, reported that the German liberal Friedrich Naumann Foundation, which is connected to the German Free Democratic Party sent money to Tibetan insurgents. According to the German newspaper Die Welt, the Chinese referred to German News Information Services GmbH as a state operated organization. Die Welt submitted that as a matter of fact GFP is a portal of left-wing journalists. The Russian news agency RIA Novosti, also referred to the Tibet-related article.
