= Steffen Reiche =

German politician

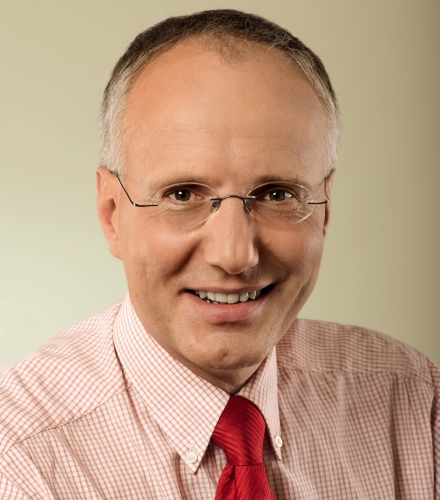
- Reiche in 2009

Member of the Bundestag; for Cottbus – Spree-Neiße
- In office 18 October 2005 – 27 October 2009
- Preceded by: Wilfried Schreck
- Succeeded by: Wolfgang Nešković

Minister for Education, Youth and Sport of Brandenburg
- In office 13 October 1999 – 13 October 2004
- Minister-President: Manfred Stolpe; Matthias Platzeck
- Preceded by: Angelika Peter
- Succeeded by: Holger Rupprecht

Minister for Science, Research and Culture of Brandenburg
- In office 11 October 1994 – 13 October 1999
- Minister-President: Manfred Stolpe
- Preceded by: Hinrich Enderlein
- Succeeded by: Wolfgang Hackel

Member of the Landtag of Brandenburg
- In office 26 October 1990 – 20 October 2005
- Preceded by: Constituency established
- Succeeded by: Sieglinde Heppener
- Constituency: Luckenwalde I – Zossen III (1990–1994); Teltow-Fläming I (1994–2004); State list (2004–2005)

Member of the Volkskammer; for Potsdam
- In office 5 April 1990 – 2 October 1990
- Preceded by: Constituency established
- Succeeded by: Constituency abolished

Personal details
- Born: 27 June 1960 (age 66) Potsdam, East Germany
- Party: Social Democratic
- Other political affiliations: SPD in the GDR (1989–1990)
- Children: 3

Steffen Reiche (born 27 June 1960) is a German politician, a representative of the Social Democratic Party (SPD).

== Early life and education ==
Reiche was born in Potsdam. After his Abitur in 1979, he studied Theology in Berlin. He took a break from studying in 1982/1983 to do an apprenticeship as cabinetmaker. In 1986 he completed his study and was from 1988 to 1990 pastor in Christinendorf.

== Political career ==
Reiche co-founded the Social Democratic Party of East Germany (SDP) in 1989, during the political process of the change ("Wende") 1989/90 that led to German Reunification. He was member of the party executive committee. Also he was member of the first free voted People's Chamber of East Germany, from March 1990 until the German Reunification on 2 October 1990.

After the merger of the SDP with the West German SPD, Reiche until 2000 was chairman of the SPD in Brandenburg. From 1990 until his resignation in 2005 he was member of the Landtag of Brandenburg. In this time he was from 1994 to 1999 Ministry of Science, Research and Culture and from 1999 to 2004 Ministry of Education, Youth and Sport.

From 2005 to 2009, Reiche was a member of the German parliament, the Bundestag, representing Cottbus – Spree-Neiße. He also served as a member of the Parliamentary group board of the SPD.

== Personal life ==
Reiche is married and has three daughters.

== See also ==
- List of Social Democratic Party of Germany politicians
