= Cottbus II =

State electoral district of Germany

44: Cottbus II
- Electoral district for the Landtag of Brandenburg
- Cottbus II in 2024
- District: Cottbus
- Electorate: 36,720 (2024)
- Major settlements: Cottbus (partial)

Current electoral district
- Created: 1994
- Party: SPD
- Member: Lars Katzmarek

Cottbus II is an electoral constituency (German: Wahlkreis) represented in the Landtag of Brandenburg. It elects one member via first-past-the-post voting. Under the constituency numbering system, it is designated as constituency 44. It is located in within the city of Cottbus.

== Geography ==
The constituency includes the districts of Gallinchen, Groß Gaglow, Kahren, Kiekebusch, Madlow, Sachsendorf, Spremberger Vorstadt, and Ströbitzwithin the city of Cottbus.

There were 36,720 eligible voters in 2024.

== Members ==
Election	Member	Party	%
2004	Frank Szymanski	SPD	33.8
2009	Jürgen Maresch	Left	32.2
2014	Kerstin Kircheis	SPD	33.6
2019	Lars Schieske	AfD	27.3
2024	Lars Katzmarek	SPD	38.0

== Election results ==
2024 Brandenburg state election: Cottbus II
Notes:	Blue background denotes the winner of the electorate vote. Pink background denotes a candidate elected from their party list. Yellow background denotes an electorate win by a list member, or other incumbent. A ✓ or ✗ denotes status of any incumbent, win or lose respectively.						
Party	Candidate	Votes	%	±%	Party votes	%	±%
SPD	Lars Katzmarek	9,746	38.0	▲13.8	8,638	33.5	▲8.0
AfD	Lars Schieske	9,238	36.0	▲8.7	8,041	31.2	▲4.4
BSW					3,742	14.5	▲14.5
CDU	Adeline Abimnwi Awemo	3,100	12.1	▼7.4	2,316	9.0	▼6.1
Greens	Heiner Bachmann	316	1.2	▼6.6	672	2.6	▼5.3
Left	Yasmin Kirsten	1,463	5.7	▼4.9	778	3.0	▼7.9
FW	Heiko Selka	1,431	5.6	▼0.3	446	1.7	▼2.3
FDP	Justus Gutsche	336	1.3	▼3.3	174	0.7	▼4.9
Tierschutzpartei					500	1.9	▼0.6
Pirates					234	0.9	▼0.4
Third Way					38	0.1	▲0.1
DKP					29	0.1	▲0.1
DLW					81	0.3	▲0.3
Values					105	0.4	▲0.4
Informal votes							
Total valid votes		25,954					
SPD gain from AfD	Majority						

=== 2019 election ===
State election (2019): Cottbus II
Notes:	Blue background denotes the winner of the electorate vote. Pink background denotes a candidate elected from their party list. Yellow background denotes an electorate win by a list member, or other incumbent. A ✓ or ✗ denotes status of any incumbent, win or lose respectively.						
Party	Candidate	Votes	%	±%	Party votes	%	±%
AfD	Lars Schieske	6,343	27.3	▲15.9	6,250	26.8	▲16.1
SPD	✗ Kerstin Kircheis	5,642	24.2	▼9.4	5,938	25.5	▼7.5
CDU	Dr. Wolfgang Bialas	4,539	19.5	▼7.5	3,512	15.1	▼13.2
Left	Stefan Ludwig	2,475	10.6	▼8.0	2,551	10.9	▼6.2
Greens	Barbara Domke	1,828	7.8	▲3.0	1,845	7.9	▲3.6
BVB/FW	Peter Pollack	1,361	5.8	▲2.4	943	4.0	▲2.4
FDP	Felix Sicker	1,085	4.7	▲3.4	1,301	5.6	▲4.6
Tierschutzpartei					597	2.6	
Pirates					184	0.8	▼0.9
ÖDP					129	0.6	
V-Partei3					70	0.3	
Informal votes		323			297		
Total valid votes		23,294			23,320		
Turnout		23,617	61.1	▲11.7			
AfD gain from SPD	Majority	722	3.1				

=== 2014 election ===
State election (2014): Cottbus II
Notes:	Blue background denotes the winner of the electorate vote. Pink background denotes a candidate elected from their party list. Yellow background denotes an electorate win by a list member, or other incumbent. A ✓ or ✗ denotes status of any incumbent, win or lose respectively.						
Party	Candidate	Votes	%	±%	Party votes	%	±%
SPD	Kerstin Kircheis	6,594	33.6	▲2.1	6,558	33.0	▼1.1
CDU	André Roßeck	5,305	27.0	▲7.4	5,626	28.3	▲10.6
Left	Matthias Loehr	3,663	18.6	▼13.6	3,389	17.1	▼12.9
AfD	Daniel Münschke	2,232	11.4		2,127	10.7	
Greens	Christoph Goltz	940	4.8	▼0.4	853	4.3	▼0.7
NPD					379	1.9	▼0.6
Pirates					329	1.7	
BVB/FW	Heiko Selka	672	3.4	▲0.5	322	1.6	▼0.5
FDP	Felix Sicker	248	1.3	▼4.5	197	1.0	▼5.6
DKP					54	0.3	▲0.1
REP					32	0.2	Steady
Informal votes		630			418		
Total valid votes		19,654			19,866		
Turnout		20,284	49.4	▼14.1			
SPD gain from Left	Majority	1,289	6.6				

=== 2009 election ===
State election (2009): Cottbus II
Notes:	Blue background denotes the winner of the electorate vote. Pink background denotes a candidate elected from their party list. Yellow background denotes an electorate win by a list member, or other incumbent. A ✓ or ✗ denotes status of any incumbent, win or lose respectively.						
Party	Candidate	Votes	%	±%	Party votes	%	±%
Left	Jürgen Maresch	8,409	32.2	▼0.5	7,857	30.0	▲0.1
SPD	Kerstin Kircheis	8,225	31.5	▼2.3	8,941	34.1	▼0.3
CDU	Dietmar Schulz	5,113	19.6	▲2.9	4,645	17.7	▲2.3
FDP	Alfred Pracht	1,526	5.8	▲2.4	1,743	6.6	▲3.6
Greens	Sven Koalick	1,353	5.2	▲2.1	1,322	5.0	▲1.8
BVB/FW	Frank Pilzecker	763	2.9		542	2.1	
NPD	Falk Haffner	701	2.7		646	2.5	
DVU					185	0.7	▼4.4
50Plus					121	0.5	▼0.2
RRP					96	0.4	
DKP					46	0.2	▼0.1
REP					43	0.2	
Die-Volksinitiative					41	0.2	
Informal votes		788			650		
Total valid votes		26,090			26,228		
Turnout		26,878	63.5	▲10.8			
Left gain from SPD	Majority	184	0.7				

=== 2004 election ===
State election (2004): Cottbus II
Notes:	Blue background denotes the winner of the electorate vote. Pink background denotes a candidate elected from their party list. Yellow background denotes an electorate win by a list member, or other incumbent. A ✓ or ✗ denotes status of any incumbent, win or lose respectively.						
Party	Candidate	Votes	%	±%	Party votes	%	±%
SPD	Frank Szymanski	7,582	33.84		7,740	34.40	
PDS	Andreas Trunschke	7,328	32.70		6,738	29.94	
CDU	Steffen Komann	3,753	16.75		3,474	15.44	
DVU					1,139	5.06	
AUB-Brandenburg	Sven Pautz	1,814	8.10		847	3.76	
FDP	Maria Kuhlmann	751	3.35		677	3.01	
Greens	Christian Hahn	701	3.13		721	3.20	
Familie					471	2.09	
AfW (Free Voters)	Monika Vandreier	479	2.14		172	0.76	
Gray Panthers					158	0.70	
50Plus					153	0.68	
DKP					61	0.27	
BRB					55	0.24	
Schill					50	0.22	
Yes Brandenburg					46	0.20	
Informal votes		374			280		
Total valid votes		22,408			22,502		
Turnout		22,782	52.72				
SPD win new seat	Majority	254	1.14				

== See also ==
- Politics of Brandenburg
- Landtag of Brandenburg
