= Lars Katzmarek =

German politician (born 1992)

Member of the Landtag of Brandenburg
- Incumbent
- Assumed office 17 October 2024
- Preceded by: Lars Schieske
- Constituency: Cottbus II

Personal details
- Born: 1992 (age 33–34)
- Party: Social Democratic Party (since 2019)

Lars Katzmarek (born 1992) is a German politician serving as a member of the Landtag of Brandenburg since 2024. He has been a member of the Social Democratic Party since 2019.
