= Lars Schieske =

German politician (born 1977)

Lars Schieske MdB

Member of the Bundestag; for Cottbus – Spree-Neiße
- Incumbent
- Assumed office 25 March 2025
- Preceded by: Maja Wallstein

Member of the Landtag of Brandenburg; for Cottbus II
- In office 25 September 2019 – 17 October 2024
- Preceded by: Kerstin Kircheis
- Succeeded by: Lars Katzmarek

Personal details
- Born: 1 January 1977 (age 49) Cottbus, East Germany
- Party: Alternative for Germany
- Children: 3

Lars Schieske (born 1 January 1977) is a German politician who was elected as a member of the Bundestag in 2025 representing Cottbus. From 2019 to 2024, he was a member of the Landtag of Brandenburg.
