= Oberspreewald-Lausitz III/Spree-Neiße III =

State electoral district of Germany

40: Oberspreewald-Lausitz III/Spree-Neiße III
- Electoral district for the Landtag of Brandenburg
- Oberspreewald-Lausitz III/Spree-Neiße III in 2024
- District: Oberspreewald-Lausitz and Spree-Neiße
- Electorate: 49,569 (2024)
- Major settlements: Calau, Lübbenau, and Vetschau

Current electoral district
- Created: 1994
- Party: AfD
- Member: Daniel Münschke

Oberspreewald-Lausitz III/Spree-Neiße III is an electoral constituency (German: Wahlkreis) represented in the Landtag of Brandenburg. It elects one member via first-past-the-post voting. Under the constituency numbering system, it is designated as constituency 40. It is split between the districts of Oberspreewald-Lausitz and Spree-Neiße.

== Geography ==
The constituency includes the towns of Calau, Lübbenau, and Vetschau within Oberspreewald-Lausitz, and the municipality of Kolkwitz and the district of Burg within Spree-Neiße.

There were 49,569 eligible voters in 2024.

== Members ==
Election	Member	Party	%
2004	Werner-Siegwart Schippel	SPD	30.6
2009	Werner-Siegwart Schippel	SPD	32.0
2014	Roswitha Schier	CDU	31.2
2019	Daniel Münschke	AfD	28.0
2024	Daniel Münschke	AfD	36.8

== Election results ==
=== 2024 election ===
State election (2024): Oberspreewald-Lausitz III / Spree-Neiße III
Notes:	Blue background denotes the winner of the electorate vote. Pink background denotes a candidate elected from their party list. Yellow background denotes an electorate win by a list member, or other incumbent. A ✓ or ✗ denotes status of any incumbent, win or lose respectively.						
Party	Candidate	Votes	%	±%	Party votes	%	±%
AfD	✓ Daniel Münschke	11,268	36.8	▲8.8	10,330	33.6	▲5.1
SPD	Jeremy Scheibe	9,376	30.6	▲5.9	9,764	31.7	▲3.8
BSW					4,040	13.1	
CDU	Kochan	4,928	16.1	▼4.3	3,518	11.4	▼5.8
Left	Dannenberg	1,681	5.5	▼6.2	670	2.2	▼6.7
BVB/FW	Christiansen	1,289	4.2	▼0.9	580	1.9	▼1.9
Tierschutzpartei	Kivman	771	2.5		486	1.6	▼0.8
DLW	Schollbach	697	2.3		341	1.1	
Greens	Schuldt	339	1.1	▼4.9	493	1.6	▼3.7
FDP	Schulz	311	1.0	▼3.2	211	0.7	▼4.1
Plus					176	0.6	▼0.5
Values					116	0.4	
Third Way					41	0.1	
DKP					12	0.0	
Informal votes		402			284		
Total valid votes		30,660			30,778		
Turnout		31,062	75.5	▲9.6			
AfD hold	Majority	1,892	6.2	▲2.8			

=== 2019 election ===
State election (2019): Oberspreewald-Lausitz III/Spree-Neiße III
Notes:	Blue background denotes the winner of the electorate vote. Pink background denotes a candidate elected from their party list. Yellow background denotes an electorate win by a list member, or other incumbent. A ✓ or ✗ denotes status of any incumbent, win or lose respectively.						
Party	Candidate	Votes	%	±%	Party votes	%	±%
AfD	Daniel Münschke	7,748	28.0	▲18.4	7,906	28.5	▲16.4
SPD	Kathrin Schneider	6,823	24.6	▼5.4	7,763	28.0	▼7.3
CDU	✗ Roswitha Schier	5,652	20.4	▼10.8	4,779	17.2	▼10.8
Left	Kathrin Dannenberg	3,222	11.6	▼6.7	2,452	8.8	▼6.1
Greens	Stefan Schön	1,667	6.0	▲1.2	1,483	5.3	▲1.9
BVB/FW	Hans-Peter Kamenz	1,400	5.1	▲3.0	1,039	3.7	▲2.5
FDP	Christopher Choritz	1,173	4.2	▲2.9	1,341	4.8	▲3.7
Tierschutzpartei					651	2.3	
Pirates					159	0.6	▼0.4
ÖDP					141	0.5	
V-Partei3					46	0.2	
Informal votes		407			332		
Total valid votes		27,685			27,760		
Turnout		28,092	65.9	▲12.2			
AfD gain from CDU	Majority	925	3.4				

=== 2014 election ===
State election (2014): Oberspreewald-Lausitz III/Spree-Neiße III
Notes:	Blue background denotes the winner of the electorate vote. Pink background denotes a candidate elected from their party list. Yellow background denotes an electorate win by a list member, or other incumbent. A ✓ or ✗ denotes status of any incumbent, win or lose respectively.						
Party	Candidate	Votes	%	±%	Party votes	%	±%
CDU	Roswitha Schier	7,327	31.2	▲2.2	6,583	28.0	▲5.2
SPD	Carola Krahl	7,031	30.0	▼2.0	8,302	35.3	▲0.2
Left	Mario Dannenberg	4,300	18.3	▼8.8	3,516	14.9	▼9.2
AfD	Detlef Lippert	2,246	9.6		2,845	12.1	
Greens	Stefan Schön	1,125	4.8	▼1.3	805	3.4	▼0.7
NPD	Ralf Reinartz	645	2.7	▼0.5	603	2.6	▲0.1
BVB/FW	Fred Steinigk	481	2.1	▼0.5	288	1.2	▼0.4
FDP	Thomas Hirsch	306	1.3		265	1.1	▼5.4
Pirates					228	1.0	
REP					58	0.2	Steady
DKP					38	0.2	▲0.1
Informal votes		413			343		
Total valid votes		23,461			23,531		
Turnout		23,874	53.7	▼14.9			
CDU gain from SPD	Majority	296	1.2				

=== 2009 election ===
State election (2009): Oberspreewald-Lausitz III/Spree-Neiße III
Notes:	Blue background denotes the winner of the electorate vote. Pink background denotes a candidate elected from their party list. Yellow background denotes an electorate win by a list member, or other incumbent. A ✓ or ✗ denotes status of any incumbent, win or lose respectively.						
Party	Candidate	Votes	%	±%	Party votes	%	±%
SPD	✓ Werner-Siegwart Schippel	9,872	32.0	▲1.4	10,947	35.1	▲1.5
CDU	Roswitha Schier	8,940	29.0	▲3.7	7,114	22.8	▲1.0
Left	Kerstin Bednarsky	8,362	27.1	▼1.5	7,537	24.1	▼1.0
FDP					2,045	6.5	▲3.3
Greens	Werner Suchner	1,895	6.1	▲3.0	1,295	4.1	▲1.6
NPD	Stella Hähnel	90	3.2		786	2.5	
DVU					511	1.6	▼4.8
BVB/FW	Daniela Kroll	805	2.6		501	1.6	
RRP					152	0.5	
50Plus					139	0.4	▼0.7
Die-Volksinitiative					103	0.3	
REP					63	0.2	
DKP					35	0.1	Steady
Informal votes		1,370			1,006		
Total valid votes		30,864			31,228		
Turnout		32,234	68.6	▲9.4			
SPD hold	Majority	932	3.0	▲1.0			

=== 2004 election ===
State election (2004): Oberspreewald-Lausitz III/Spree-Neiße III
Notes:	Blue background denotes the winner of the electorate vote. Pink background denotes a candidate elected from their party list. Yellow background denotes an electorate win by a list member, or other incumbent. A ✓ or ✗ denotes status of any incumbent, win or lose respectively.						
Party	Candidate	Votes	%	±%	Party votes	%	±%
SPD	Werner-Siegwart Schippel	8,543	30.63		9,441	33.58	
PDS	Wolfgang Thiel	7,974	28.59		7,069	25.14	
CDU	Roswitha Schier	7,046	25.26		6,140	21.84	
DVU					1,800	6.40	
FDP	Bernhard Munitzk	1,176	4.22		898	3.19	
Familie					792	2.82	
AfW (Free Voters)	Peter Schollbach	950	3.41		251	0.89	
Greens	Ronald Miottke	862	3.09		691	2.46	
AUB-Brandenburg	Mario Michling	857	3.07		325	1.16	
50Plus					313	1.11	
Gray Panthers					159	0.57	
BRB					77	0.27	
Yes Brandenburg					76	0.27	
Schill	Bernd Erlat	486	1.74		48	0.17	
DKP					34	0.12	
Informal votes		908			688		
Total valid votes		27,894			28,114		
Turnout		28,802	59.25				
SPD win new seat	Majority	569	2.04				

== See also ==
- Politics of Brandenburg
- Landtag of Brandenburg
