= Klaus-Peter Schulze =

German politician

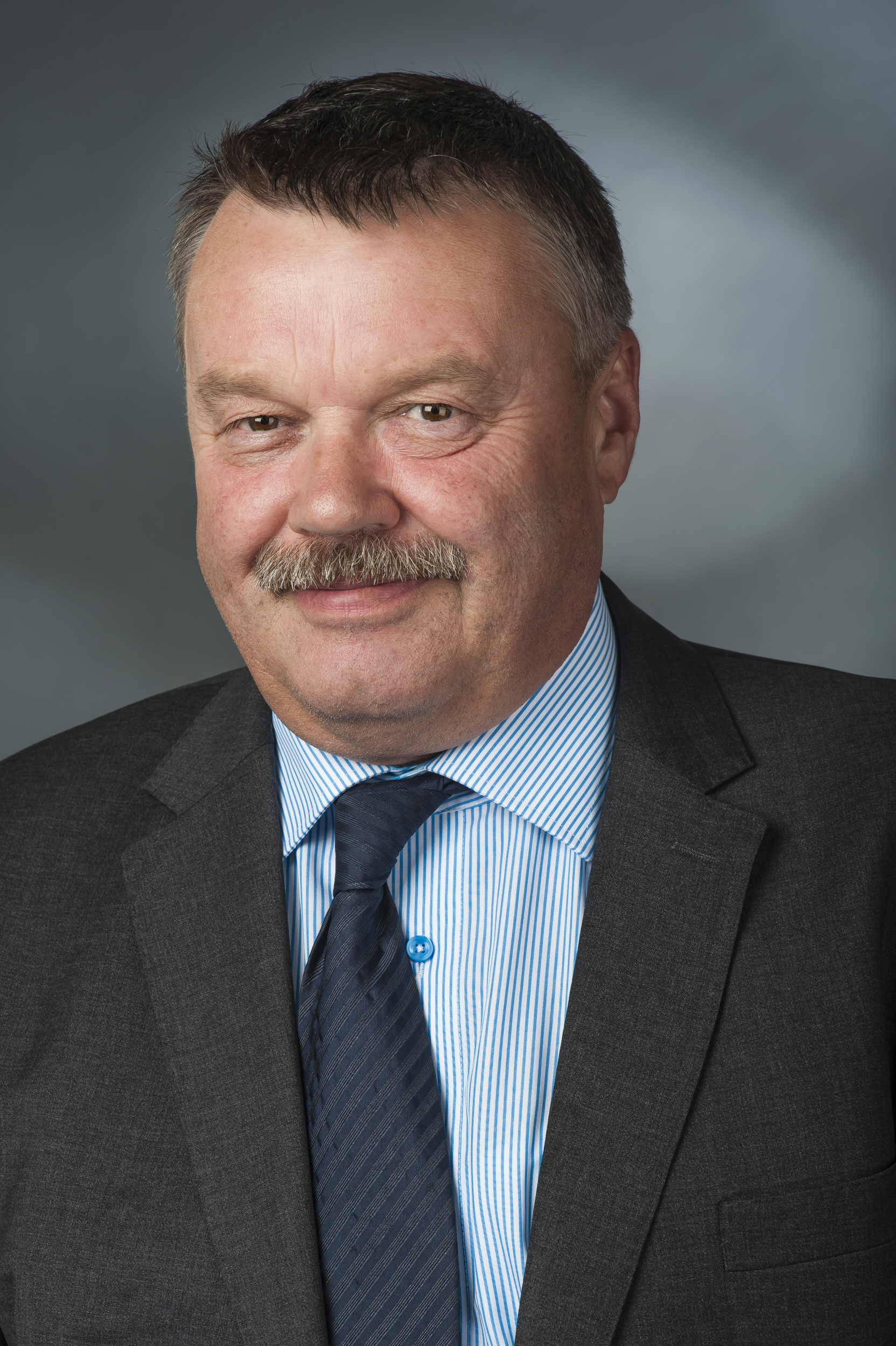
- Schulze in 2014

Member of the Bundestag; for Cottbus – Spree-Neiße
- In office 22 October 2013 – 26 October 2021
- Preceded by: Wolfgang Nešković
- Succeeded by: Maja Wallstein

Mayor of Spremberg
- In office 6 May 2002 – 12 October 2013
- Preceded by: Egon Wochatz
- Succeeded by: Christina Schönherr (acting)

Personal details
- Born: 3 July 1954 (age 72) Döbern, East Germany
- Party: Christian Democratic Union
- Children: 3

Klaus-Peter Schulze (born 3 July 1954) is a German politician. Born in Döbern, Brandenburg, he represents the CDU. Klaus-Peter Schulze has served as a member of the Bundestag from the state of Brandenburg from 2013 to October 2021.

== Life ==
He became member of the bundestag after the 2013 German federal election. He is a member of the Committee on Tourism and the Committee on Environment, Nature Conservation and Nuclear Safety. In January 2021, Schulze announced, that he will not be start in 2021 German federal election.
