= Maja Wallstein =

German politician

Maja Wallstein MdB
- Wallstein in 2021

Member of the Bundestag; from Brandenburg
- Incumbent
- Assumed office 26 October 2021
- Preceded by: Klaus-Peter Schulze
- Constituency: Cottbus – Spree-Neiße (2021–2025); State list (2025–present)

Personal details
- Born: 18 March 1986 (age 40) Cottbus, East Germany
- Party: Social Democratic
- Education: University of Potsdam; Jagiellonian University

Maja Scarlett Wallstein (born 18 March 1986) is a German politician of the Social Democratic Party (SPD) who has been serving as a member of the Bundestag since 2021.

== Early life and career ==
Wallstein was born 1986 in the East German city of Cottbus and studied Polonistics at the University of Potsdam and the Jagiellonian University.

Wallstein worked as parliamentary advisor at the Bundestag from 2013 to 2017 and as advisor on political communications and research policy at the Helmholtz Association from 2018 to 2020.

== Political career ==
Wallstein became a member of the Bundestag in the 2021 elections, representing the Cottbus – Spree-Neiße district. In parliament, she has since been serving on the Committee on Education, Research and Technology Assessment. She is her parliamentary group’s spokesperson on research policy.

Within her parliamentary group, Wallstein is part of a working group on strategies against right-wing extremism.

Wallstein failed to retain her direct mandate in the 2025 election, but entered the new Bundestag as the SPD's second list member for Brandenburg.

== Other activities ==
- German Foundation for Peace Research (DSF), Member of the Board (since 2022)
