= Daniel Münschke =

German politician (born 1980)

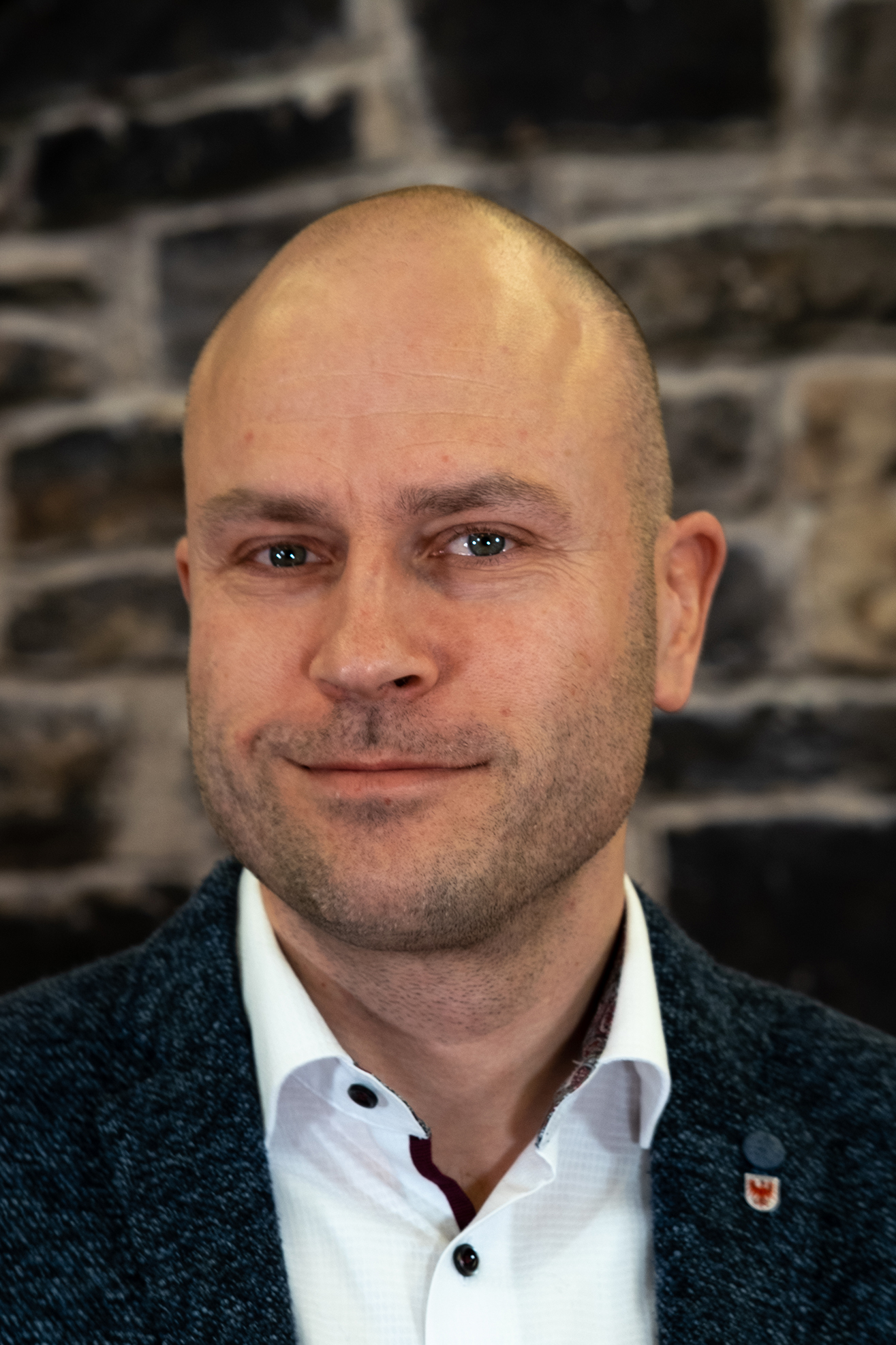
- Münschke in 2020

Member of the Landtag of Brandenburg
- Incumbent
- Assumed office 25 September 2019
- Preceded by: Roswitha Schier
- Constituency: Oberspreewald-Lausitz III/Spree-Neiße III

Personal details
- Born: 1980 (age 45–46) Guben
- Party: Alternative for Germany (since 2013)

Daniel Münschke (born 1980 in Guben) is a right-wing German politician serving as a member of the Landtag of Brandenburg since 2019. He has served as vice president of the Landtag since 2024.

In the 2019 report released by the Federal Office for the Protection of the Constitution Münschke was demonstrated to have been active in a right-wing extremist band Hassgesang on Twitter and in the Identitarian movement.
