= Ulrich Freese =

German politician

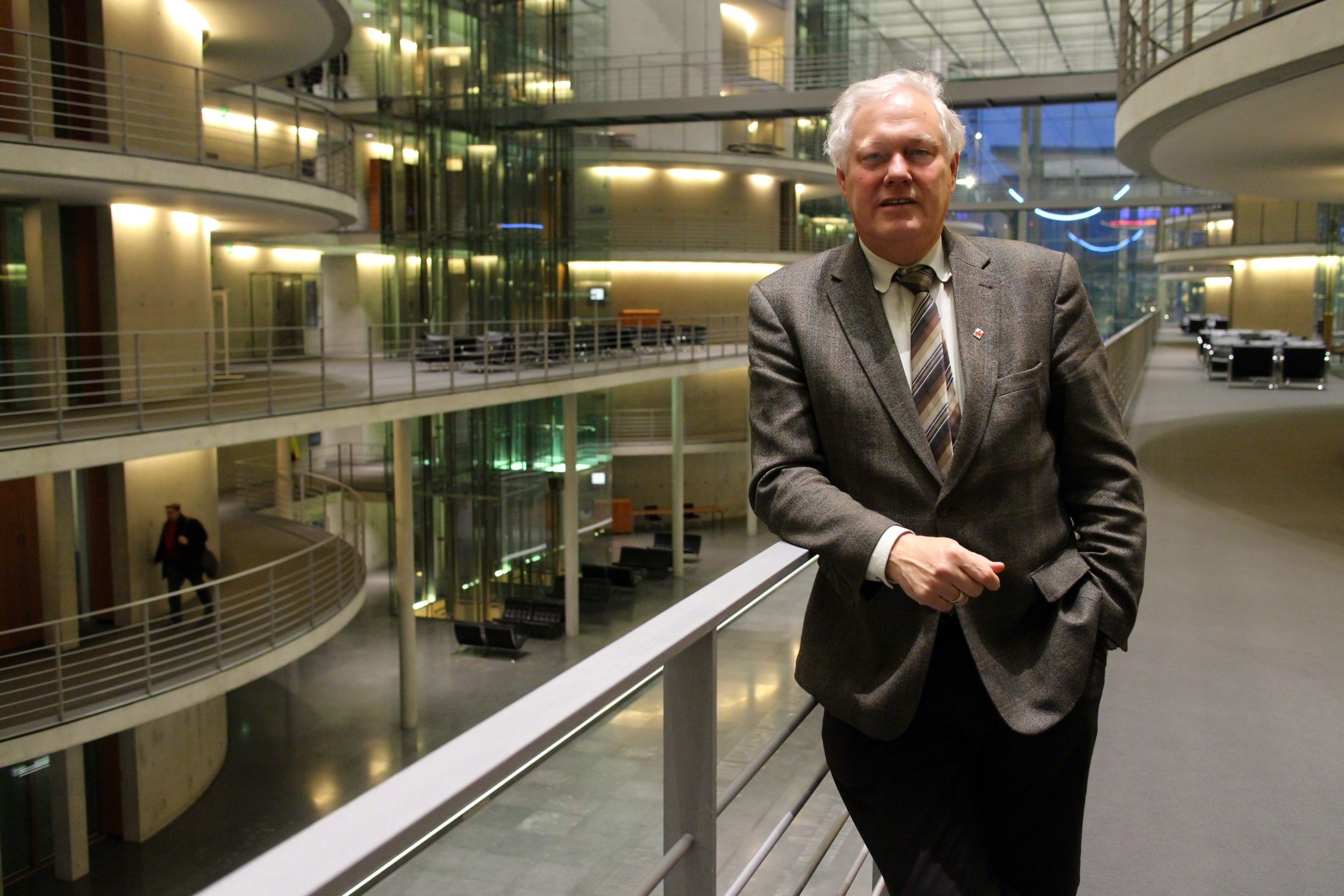
- Ulrich Freese in 2014

Member of the Bundestag
- Incumbent
- Assumed office 2013

Personal details
- Born: 12 April 1951 (age 75) Hünxe, West Germany (now Germany)
- Party: SPD

Ulrich Freese (born 12 April 1951) is a German politician. Born in Hünxe, North Rhine-Westphalia, he represents the SPD. Ulrich Freese has served as a member of the Bundestag from the state of Brandenburg from 2013 to 2021.

== Life ==
He was a member of the Brandenburg state parliament from 1994 to 2004. From 2004 to 2013, he was deputy chairman of the Mining and Energy Industrial Union. He became member of the bundestag after the 2013 German federal election. He is a member of the Committee for Economics and Energy. In April 2021, Freese announced that he would not stand in the 2021 federal elections but instead resign from active politics by the end of the parliamentary term.
