= Wolfgang Nešković =

German jurist and politician

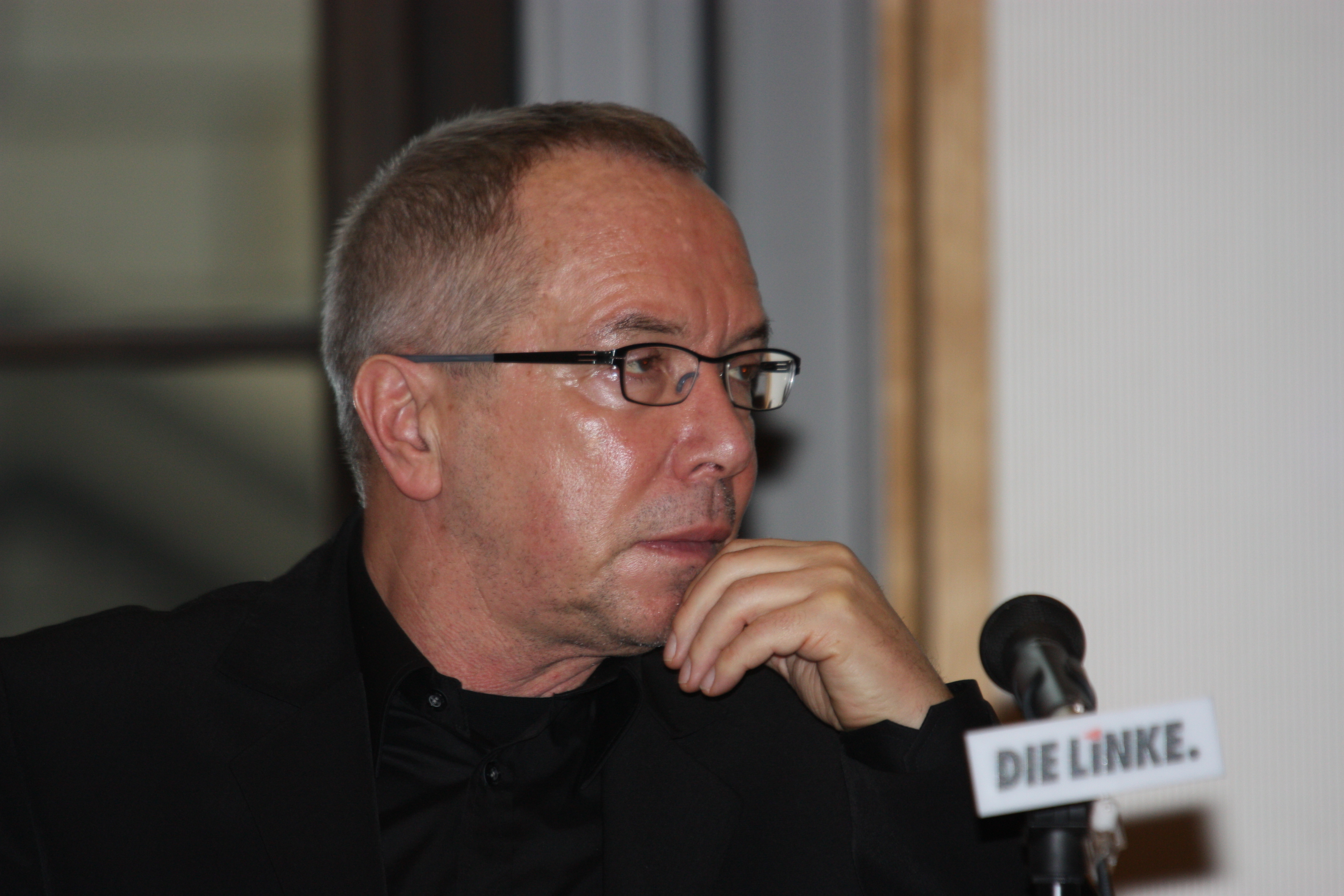
- Nešković in 2009

Member of the Bundestag; from Brandenburg
- In office 18 October 2005 – 22 October 2013
- Preceded by: Multi-member district
- Succeeded by: Klaus-Peter Schulze
- Constituency: State list (2005–2009); Cottbus – Spree-Neiße (2009–2013)

Personal details
- Born: 3 June 1948 (age 78) Lübeck, Germany
- Party: Independent
- Other political affiliations: SPD (1979–1994); Grüne (1995–2005); PDS (2005–2007); Die Linke (2007–2012)
- Education: University of Hamburg

Wolfgang Nešković (born 3 June 1948) is a German politician, former judge at the German Federal Court of Justice and an independent member of the German Federal Parliament, representing Cottbus – Spree-Neiße. He was a representative of the party The Left, and prior to that, Bündnis '90/Die Grünen as well as the Social Democratic Party of Germany.

== Works ==
- Nešković, Wolfgang (ed.). Der CIA-Folterreport: Der offizielle Bericht des US-Senats zum Internierungs- und Verhörprogramm der CIA. Frankfurt: Westend, 2015, ISBN 978-3-86489-093-2 (German translation of the Committee Study of the Central Intelligence Agency's Detention and Interrogation Program)

== See also ==
- List of German Left Party politicians
