= List of Hogan's Heroes episodes =

Hogan's Heroes is an American television sitcom co-created by Bernard Fein and Albert S. Ruddy. The show is set during World War II, and concerns a group of Allied prisoners of war who use a German POW camp as a base of operations for sabotage and espionage purposes directed against Nazi Germany. It ran for six seasons, with 168 half-hour episodes being produced in total. The show premiered on CBS on September 17, 1965, and ran until April 4, 1971. The series was filmed in color except for the pilot episode, which was filmed in black-and-white.

== Background ==
From the beginning the show's producers decided that Stalag 13 would always have a snowy winter. Beyond recreating an extreme or adverse setting, this was to prevent problems with continuity and to allow the episodes to be shown in any order.

Like most sitcoms of its time, Hogan's Heroes was not serialized, so the episodes generally have no relation to each other, except for two composed of two parts: "A Tiger Hunt in Paris" (1966) and "Lady Chitterly's Lover" (1970).

== Series overview ==
Season	Episodes	Originally released	
Season	Episodes	First released	Last released
1	32	September 17, 1965	April 29, 1966
2	30	September 16, 1966	April 7, 1967
3	30	September 9, 1967	March 30, 1968
4	26	September 28, 1968	March 22, 1969
5	26	September 26, 1969	March 27, 1970
6	24	September 20, 1970	April 4, 1971

== Episodes ==
=== Pilot episode ===
The pilot episode, "The Informer", filmed in black-and-white in mid-1964, aired on CBS on September 17, 1965. The episode's plot centered on two new prisoners entering Stalag 13 (in this episode, referred to as Camp 13), Lieutenant Carter (played by Hovis), who escapes into the camp, and Wagner (played by Noam Pitlik), who is actually a German spy posing as an Allied prisoner. Wagner attempts to expose Hogan's operation to General Burkhalter (here known as Colonel Burkhalter), but Hogan and his men are able to discredit the spy. As punishment for his outlandish claims, the spy is sent to the Russian front.

Although the series remained true to the pilot in most respects, there were some changes. Some of the prisoners' luxuries, such as an underground steam room, were eliminated to make the situation marginally more plausible. The character of Colonel Klink was made more of a fool than a villain, while his sharp accent was toned down. Klink's walk had less of the distinctive stoop. He also does not carry the riding crop he often affected during prisoner roll calls in other episodes.

The major difference was that only the pilot was shot in black-and-white. After the series was sold to CBS, the network announced a major push in color programming for the 1965–66 season, and so the rest of the season (and the series) was filmed in color.

The character of Vladimir Minsk, a Soviet POW played by Leonid Kinskey, was intended to be a series regular. However, Kinskey declined to continue with the series. Stewart Moss, who played an American POW named Olson in the pilot, also declined an offer to become a series regular. Larry Hovis was intended to be a guest star in the pilot only. However, producer Ed Feldman was impressed by his performance and, after Kinskey and Moss declined to take part in the series, was offered a regular role. Hovis's character was changed from a lieutenant to a sergeant. According to Hovis, Feldman chose to do this because "sergeants are more sympathetic." Although Hovis's character had escaped at the end of the pilot, Feldman did not see this as a problem because he believed "no one will care".

=== Season 1 (1965–66) ===
No. overall	No. in season	Title	Directed by	Written by	Original release date	Prod. code
1	1	"The Informer"	Robert Butler	T : Richard M. Powell; S/T : Bernard Fein, Albert S. Ruddy	September 17, 1965	5784-01
Pilot episode: At Camp 13, a German prisoner-of-war camp, Colonel Robert Hogan and his fellow cohorts are a subversive group with many hidden talents. Lt. Carter (Larry Hovis) is brought to the camp and introduced to some of the other prisoners. Wagner (Noam Pitlik), a spy posing as an American, has been planted amongst the men by the Germans. Hogan knows he is a spy and instructs the men not to tell him anything. When Wagner learns of the gang's subversive operations, "Hogan's Heroes" must act fast to discredit him. Hogan shows Wagner their "underground operations" where even Klink's secretary Helga (Cynthia Lynn) is helping. The next day, Wagner and Col. Albert Burkhalter (Leon Askin) confront Hogan and his men. Every time Wagner tries to show what the prisoners are up to, the men have found a way for it to backfire on him. Note: This is the only black-and-white episode in the series. Timeline: the date given is February 1942.
2	2	"Hold That Tiger"	Robert Butler	Richard M. Powell	September 24, 1965	5784-03
Colonel Klink boasts that the Nazis' new tiger tank will lead the Germans to victory. Hogan wants to steal one of the tanks, have it dismantled and send its blueprints to the Allies. Newkirk dresses up as a Gestapo Agent in order to get out of the camp. He steals a tank and brings it back to the camp. LeBeau is to leave the camp to get the underground agent, code named Tiger, who will receive the blueprints. All of this in plain sight of Klink who will not question what a Gestapo Agent does. The men hide the tank and start to take it apart. LeBeau comes back with Tiger (Arlene Martel), who happens to be a female agent. General Hofstader arrives to find out what happened to the tank. The tank has been covertly reassembled and then let to drive off unoccupied. This creates a diversion so that Tiger can escape with the blueprints. Jon Cedar as Cpl. Langenscheidt. In this episode, a modified M7 Priest SPG is used to represent the German Tiger tank.
3	3	"Kommandant of the Year"	Robert Butler	Laurence Marks	October 1, 1965	5784-04
Major Hauser tells Klink that the Germans will store a secret rocket at Stalag 13 until its base on the Atlantic coast is completed. They are doing this as they know the Allies will not bomb a POW camp. After notifying his contacts, Hogan is informed they are sending Dr. Schneider (Woodrow Parfrey), a scientist, and some men. Schneider wants time to inspect the rocket. Hogan creates a phony "Kommandant of the Year" award as a diversion. LeBeau arranges for Schneider and his men to enter the camp in German uniforms as part of the award presentation. During Klink's speech, Schneider inspects the rocket. Hogan places a bomb that will cause the rocket to fire. Major Hauser sees Schneider by the rocket. Hauser wants to show Schneider aspects of the rocket. Schneider sneaks off and the bomb cause the rocket to fire. Victor French as Commando.
4	4	"The Late Inspector General"	Robert Butler	Richard M. Powell	October 8, 1965	5784-02
Hogan makes plans to have Olsen (Stewart Moss) escape the camp and then go and blow up a train. Klink tells Hogan that he is expecting a visit from General Von Platzen (John Dehner), the Inspector General. Hogan's men try to prevent the inept Klink from being transferred. The plan works too well and Von Platzen tells Klink that his camp is the model for others. Klink will be promoted and sent to Berlin to run all the Stalags in Germany. Hogan knows that if they get a new Commandant things might not go as well. Now the men have to make Klink look bad. But the men go too far and make Klink look so bad that when Von Platzen gets back to Berlin he will have Klink arrested. Hogan and his men find a way to stop Von Platzen from reporting back to headquarters in Berlin.
5	5	"The Flight of the Valkyrie"	Gene Reynolds	Richard M. Powell	October 15, 1965	5784-09
Baroness Lili von Schlichter (Louise Troy) is smuggled into Stalag 13. Despite everyone looking for her, the plan is to smuggle her out of Germany. Hogan tells her they are rebuilding a plane to fly her out. Klink informs Hogan that he had Col. Crittenden transferred to the camp. Crittenden is now senior POW and will be replacing Hogan as man in charge. Crittenden discovers Lili and says he'll have to turn her in. Lili convinces him not to say anything for the time being. Hogan gets Crittenden to get Klink to agree to have a Camp Orchestra. The music actually comes from a record player and is used as a distraction to finish the plane. When the time comes to fly out, Newkirk, Carter, and Crittenden go to the fence. Crittenden does not know about the plane and thinks they are just trying to escape. Crittenden cuts a wire and a fence section falls down. Then the plane, with Baroness Lily in it, flies off. Klink transfers Crittenden back to Stalag 18. Note: First appearance of Colonel Crittendon (Bernard Fox).
6	6	"The Prisoner's Prisoner"	Gene Reynolds	R.S. Allen, Harvey Bullock	October 22, 1965	5784-06
Sergeant Walters (John Orchard), of a British commando unit, is brought to Stalag 13. The unit was captured after a failed attempt to blow up a crucial German ammo depot. Walters tells Hogan that the explosives are still at the depot and only need a couple wires attached to the timer. The location is important because German General Karl Schmidt (Roger C. Carmel) has his command center there. Schmidt is staging a big attack and headquarters was hoping destroying the depot would put a stop to it. Thanks to Klink's unknowing help, Hogan and Carter set the detonator for the explosives at the depot and kidnap Schmidt. Hogan convinces Klink that Schmidt is a spy in order to keep him in the camp. Hogan then tries to get Schmidt to believe that he is in need of dire medical attention from the outside. When Schmidt finally gives Hogan the name of a contact on the outside, they are able to learn the location of his attack center.
7	7	"German Bridge Is Falling Down"	Gene Reynolds	Laurence Marks	October 29, 1965	5784-07
An Allied bombing mission fails to take out the Adolf Hitler bridge. Hogan decides to try to destroy it from the ground. Being short on explosives, Hogan tells Carter to start manufacturing some more in one of the tunnels. Carter manages to repeatedly set off explosions in the tunnel and destroys part of it. The men find a way to have Klink not suspect anything. When Carter fails to make an explosive, Hogan then wants to steal gunpowder from the camp ammunition hut. During the night, the men paint anti-Nazi graffiti on the ammo building. Klink has the men repaint the building. This allows the men to break into it while they repaint it. They build a bomb and then figure out how they can get it to the bridge via a German courier. Hogan learns from Schultz that the courier is taking a detour. Hogan manages to get Klink to make sure the courier does not take the detour. The bridge is blown up. Hogan has a reason for volunteering his men to rebuild the bridge. Forrest Compton as Pilot.
8	8	"Movies Are Your Best Escape"	Howard Morris	Laurence Marks	November 5, 1965	5784-12
General Von Kaplow (Henry Corden) arrives in camp with a briefcase chained to his wrist. Hogan is introduced to Lieutenant Ritchie (John Crawford) and Lieutenant Donner (William Christopher) of the RAF. Their plane was shot down nearby. Hogan sets up a dinner party with Von Kaplow as the guest of honor. During the dinner, Newkirk steals the briefcase long enough for LeBeau to take pictures of the papers inside. The papers turn out to be battle plans that Hogan wants to get to London. Hogan comes up with a plan to make Klink believe the Germans are losing the war and the Russians are close to liberating Stalag 13. Hogan then has Ritchie and Donner dress as a Luftwaffe film crew. Hopefully they will be able to smuggle the pictures of the battle plans out of camp. Hogan tells Klink that the film crew want to show Klink in a good light for the Russians. Von Kaplow returns and tells Klink that the German's are not losing the war. Not needing the film crew anymore, Klink gives Ritchie and Donner a car and they leave with the plans.
9	9	"Go Light on the Heavy Water"	Howard Morris	Arthur Julian	November 12, 1965	5784-10
Captain Mueller (John Stephenson) brings a truck with a mysterious cargo into camp. He came to the camp because he knows the Allies will not bomb a POW camp. Mueller tells Klink that he is on the way to Berlin with cargo from Norway for a secret project. Everyone says that the cargo is just a barrel of water, but Hogan does not believe it. While Newkirk creates a diversion, Carter sneaks into the heavily guarded truck. Turns out the cargo is just water. However, they soon find out that the water is actually heavy water to be used for the Nazis' atomic research program. Hogan convinces Klink that the water comes from a fountain of youth and may help with his baldness. Klink wants to take the barrel and replace it with another. But he is interrupted by Mueller who tells Klink what it really is. Hogan and his men come up with another way to replace the barrel. Lawrence Montaigne as Sergeant Steinfeld. Eddie Firestone as POW Scotty. Note: LeBeau (Robert Clary) does not appear in this episode.
10	10	"Top Hat, White Tie and Bomb Sights"	Gene Reynolds	Laurence Marks	November 19, 1965	5784-14
Hogan needs to get an urgent message to Agent Willie about cancelling a weapons drop because of a suspected trap. Klink tells the men that the wire around the camp will now be electrified. Klink bugs Hogan's office, but the men notice the microphones right away. The men stage a conversation in order to convince Klink that Hogan is a Nazi sympathizer. General Burkhalter wants Klink to make things comfortable for Hogan to possibly gain more information from him. Hogan then feeds Klink false information about working on the Norden in his younger days. The Germans believe that Norden is the bomb-sight that the Allies tested new bombing accuracy devices. General Burkhalter arrives. He wants Klink to arrange a party for Hogan at a restaurant in town and to have some women there. Hogan picks a certain restaurant because Agent Willie is supposed to work there. Hogan makes contact with Willie and gives him the urgent message. Later, Burkhalter wants Hogan to tell him about the Norden. Hogan describes what he calls a Norden vacuum cleaner. Sigrid Valdis as Gretchen.
11	11	"Happiness Is a Warm Sergeant"	Gene Reynolds	Laurence Marks	November 26, 1965	5784-15
Captain Jeb Winslow's (Bruce Yarnell) plane is shot down and LeBeau sneaks him into camp. Hogan's radio goes down and Kinchloe gives him a list of parts needed for repair. To get the parts they have to go into town and let one of the underground agents buy the items. Newkirk pretends to have a toothache so that Schultz will take him to town to see a dentist. The underground agent works at a bar in town. Newkirk and Schultz have a couple drinks and soon Schultz is drunk. Newkirk gets the parts and takes Schultz back to the camp in a wheelbarrow. Klink says he will replace Schultz and have him transferred elsewhere. Sergeant Krebs (Norman Alden), who is strictly military, arrives to replace Schultz. Schultz discovers about Captain Winslow. Hogan tells Schultz that if he keeps quiet, they will get rid of Krebs. The men find several ways to discredit Krebs, have Winslow escape from camp and get Schultz's job back.
12	12	"The Scientist"	Howard Morris	Laurence Marks	December 3, 1965	5784-13
Captured French scientist Henry Du Bois (Maurice Marsac) is brought into the camp. Hogan learns that he is collaborating with the Germans. Hogan is to try to get him to their side. If he cannot, then Hogan is to eliminate Du Bois and his work. Hogan tricks Klink into letting LeBeau assist Du Bois. Du Bois tells LeBeau that he is only helping the Germans because they are holding his daughter in a hotel in town. Hogan and Newkirk dress as German officers and retrieve Du Bois' daughter, Marie. The men smuggle Du Bois out of camp and reunite him with Marie. It will be 24 hours before a British sub can pick up Henry and Marie. Hogan tells Klink that Du Bois has escaped. A Professor Altman (Parley Baer) is coming to the camp to check up on Du Bois. Hogan suggests to Klink that LeBeau pretend to be Du Bois. Not knowing anything about chemistry, LeBeau fakes his way through his interview with Altman. Newkirk feeding Altman and his assistant Captain Krug lots of wine helps things along. Hogan finds out that Henry and Marie have been picked up. Altman is to come back the next day. Hogan tells Klink to just say Du Bois was killed in explosion in his lab. Forrest Compton as First Officer. Buck Young as Second Officer.
13	13	"Hogan's Hofbrau"	Gene Reynolds	Laurence Marks	December 10, 1965	5784-16
Hogan and the men learn that Captain Milheiser (Frank Marth), from the Adolf Hitler Division, will be coming to see Klink. Milheiser and Lieutenant Dernitts (Willard Sage) arrive. They are there fundraising for the "Beautify Berchtesgaden" project. The ruthless officers threaten Klink into pledging much more than he can afford. London asks Hogan why the Adolf Hitler Division, with many of its forces, are in the area. Hogan sneaks out of camp and goes to Hilda's Hofbrau House to try to get details of the German army unit. Hogan runs into Milheiser and Dernitts. Hogan messages London that the Hitler Division is moving to the Russian front. Hogan, Newkirk, Carter and LeBeau go back to Hilda's and are spotted by Schultz. They come up with a way to keep Schultz quiet. Klink goes to Hilda's to tell Milheiser he does not have the money. Klink panics when he sees Hogan and his men there. But Hogan saves the day when he gives Klink the money he needs. Paula Stewart as Hilda.
14	14	"Oil for the Lamps of Hogan"	Howard Morris	Laurence Marks	December 17, 1965	5784-18
Gen. Burkhalter brings Fritz Bowman (William Mims) to Stalag 13. Burkhalter tells Klink that the Allies are bombing many of their industrial plants. Bowman is to build a synthetic fuel plant inside Stalag 13 as the Allies are not likely to bomb a POW camp. LeBeau learns that they will be temporarily moving all the prisoners. Hogan knows that moving would be the end of their operation. Hogan comes up with a plan to make Klink believe that there is a large amount of oil under the camp. He gets Klink to believe the two of them could become rich after the war. Hogan tells Klink that they have to get Burkhalter in on the get rich scheme as he is the only one that can stop the fuel plant from being built. Burkhalter cannot convince Bowman to change locations. Hogan then makes it look as though the Allies are willing to bomb the camp. Bowman will build elsewhere.
15	15	"Reservations Are Required"	Gene Reynolds	Laurence Marks	December 24, 1965	5784-08
LeBeau leaves the camp to pick some mushrooms. He runs into Braden (Robert Hogan) and Mills who escaped from Stalag 9. LeBeau agrees to take them to see Hogan. All of a sudden there are 20 escapees. Hogan tells all the men it will take some time to get them all out. Braden does not want to wait that long and plans his own escape with Mills. Hogan sees Braden and Mills trying to escape. Not wanting to ruin it for the other men, Hogan prevents the two from leaving. It is time for the escape and the men are led through the tunnel. But at the end hatch are Germans looking around. Hogan comes up with another plan. It takes some doing, but the twenty POW's escape and can get back to England.
16	16	"Anchors Aweigh, Men of Stalag 13"	Howard Morris	David Chandler, Jack H. Robinson	December 31, 1965	5784-11
Hogan and LeBeau meet up with British POW Captain Michaels (Michael St. Clair), who has just escaped from Stalag 5. Michaels arrives in a stolen truck that contains a computerized German gun-sight. Hogan hopes to send Michaels and the gun-sight to London. London reports to Hogan that the escape sub is out of commission. Hogan comes up with a plan. Hogan convinces Klink he is fatigued and should have an Officer's Club to relax in. Hogan's men build the club in the shape of a large boat and call it a "yacht club". Klink wants to have a party at the club the same night that Michaels was supposed to escape on it. Klink invites General Burkhalter. Carter makes up a story to Klink that Burkhalter frowns upon extravagant Officer's Clubs. So that Burkhalter does not see the club, Hogan tricks Klink into having the boat moved to the water and having the Germans do it. Of course, the Germans do not know that Michaels and the gun-sight are aboard. Fredd Wayne as Sergeant Kristman.
17	17	"Happy Birthday, Adolf"	Robert Butler	Laurence Marks	January 7, 1966	5784-05
Hogan receives word that there will be an Allied probing raid in 48 hours. Within the next day there will be radio silence. LeBeau is sent to look over the area where the planes will be flying. He sees that the Germans have reinforced the area with anti-aircraft artillery. As the radio silence has started, Hogan cannot warn the Allies. Hitler's birthday is soon and Hogan comes up with a plan. Dressed as Germans, Hogan makes Major Keitel (Howard Caine), commander of the gun-placement, believe that he has orders from Berlin for a party. Hogan then comes up with a way for Klink to send him and some of his men to the site of the guns. They will go under the guise of setting up for the party. During the party, Hogan's men sabotage the guns.
18	18	"The Gold Rush"	Howard Morris	Laurence Marks	January 14, 1966	5784-19
New prisoner Captain Edward H. Martin (Tom Hatten) is brought into the camp. Schultz tells Klink about a truck filled with gold bricks looted from France that is going to a local bank. Hogan and the men eavesdrop and hear about the truck. Hogan slips a false map into Martin's items. Klink finds it and thinks that he has found a map of an air-raid that is going to happen at the bank. To save the gold from the Allied attack, Klink volunteers to store it at his camp. The men rig it so that Klink's wooden front steps fall apart. Hogan volunteers to rebuild the steps with brick. Major Krieger (Rick Traeger) arrives with the truck full of gold. After drugging the guards, the prisoners take all the gold out of the truck. They then paint the gold bars red and the bricks gold color. Hogan then puts the fake bars back in the truck and builds Klink's steps with the painted gold bars. Note: The vehicle which delivers the gold is a modified Ford panel truck from the 1948 to 1950 model years.
19	19	"Hello, Zolle"	Gene Reynolds	David Chandler, Jack H. Robinson	January 21, 1966	5784-17
Klink's old friend, General Hans Stofle (Gilbert Green) comes by the Stalag. Stofle has also brought with him a young female named Ingeborg (Britt Nilsson). The General is the commander of a large military unit in Africa. London asks Hogan's team to keep Stofle occupied at the camp while the Allies attack his command post. Gestapo agent, Major Zolle (Gavin MacLeod), arrives from Berlin. Zolle and his fellow agents search the camp for possible escape routes for the prisoners. Hogan finds a way for Zolle to believe that Stofle is a prisoner trying to escape. Zolle then takes Stofle into custody. Ramon Bieri as Steiner.
20	20	"It Takes a Thief... Sometimes"	Howard Morris	Richard M. Powell	January 28, 1966	5784-20
Hogan and LeBeau come across four people who claim to be underground agents. The four suggest working together. What Hogan does not know is that three of the underground agents are really Gestapo commanded by Captain Heinrich (Michael Constantine). The fourth is a French woman named Michelle (Claudine Longet). Heinrich later tells Klink that there has been a lot of sabotage around Stalag 13. Heinrich says that he will lead the people responsible into a trap. Hogan and his men are eavesdropping on the whole conversation. Meeting again with the agents, Hogan suggests blowing up part of Stalag 13. That was not what Heinrich was planning on doing, but he cannot change Hogan's mind. Michelle asks Hogan to run away with her. Heinrich thinks it is fake dynamite being loaded into his truck, but Hogan has switched it with real stuff. Hogan changes plans again and blows up a railroad tunnel with two of the agents inside. Heinrich realizes he is in trouble, tries to get away but does not get far before he is taken out as well. Hogan tells Michelle he will smuggle her out of Germany.
21	21	"The Great Impersonation"	Gene Reynolds	Laurence Marks	February 4, 1966	5784-22
LeBeau, Carter, Newkirk and Kinchloe are outside of camp and have blown up a train. LeBeau, Carter and Newkirk are caught by the Gestapo. Kinchloe returns and tells Hogan what has happened. The Gestapo Captain (James Frawley) sends the men, with their false names, to Stalag 4 for interrogation. Hogan gets Schultz to believe that the men might tell the Gestapo all about Schultz's actions at Stalag 13. Hogan tries to convince Schultz to pose as Klink and go to Stalag 4 to rescue the prisoners. Schultz at first refuses, but then gives in. Schultz and Hogan go to Stalag 4 and speak to Maj. Bernsdorf (Bert Freed). Bernsdorf will not release the prisoners. Kinchloe calls Bernsdorf posing as a Gestapo General and demands he deliver the men, which he does. The Gestapo Captain comes to Stalag 13. Klink assures him that there are no prisoners with the names he was given in the camp.
22	22	"The Pizza Parlor"	Gene Reynolds	Arthur Julian	February 11, 1966	5784-24
Hogan learns that Italian prison camp commander Major Bonacelli (Hans Conried) is coming to study under Klink. What Hogan does not know is that while on the way to the camp, Bonacelli tries to get his German driver to take him to Switzerland. Hogan hopes to gain Bonacelli's favor by serving him a pizza, but LeBeau needs a recipe. Hogan radios the Submarine Captain (Harry Lauter) that he needs to get through to Garlotti's Pizzeria in Newark. Getting in touch with the pizzeria involves a complicated game of "Telephone". Bonacelli notices the smell of pizza coming from Hogan's barracks. While Bonacelli enjoys the pizza, Hogan finds out that he plans to defect to the US. Hogan talks Bonacelli into going back to Italy and spying for the Allies. Bonacelli's German driver tells Klink that he tried to defect to Switzerland. Klink arrests Bonacelli. Hogan finds a way to make Bonacelli look loyal in Klink's eyes. Jack Good as Captain Henderson. Joe E. Tata as Tony Garlotti.
23	23	"The 43rd, a Moving Story"	Howard Morris	James Allardice, Tom Adair	February 25, 1966	5784-21
Soldier Lynch brings Hogan some explosives. Hogan gets orders to knock out the German's 43rd mobile anti-aircraft battery prior to an Allied raid on a chemicals plant. Carter and Newkirk are to dress as German's, get to the battery and plant the explosives. Hogan is called to Klink's office to meet the new temporary 2nd in command, Major Hans Kuehn (Sandy Kenyon). Kuehn proves to be quite power-hungry. He also continually threatens to get a hold of his Uncle Karl, Field Marshal Karl Von Streicher, who is on the General Staff. When Kuehn doubles the guard around the camp, Hogan's plans to get to the battery are put on hold. Hogan makes sure that Kuehn overhears some misinformation about where a bombing is to take place. Kuehn calls General Burkhalter with this information and suggests moving the 43rd battery to that location. Burkhalter comes by and relieves Kuehn of his duties because moving the battery allowed the bombing of the chemicals plant. When Kuehn says he'll speak with his Uncle Karl, Burkhalter tells him that Karl was at the chemicals plant.
24	24	"How to Cook a German Goose by Radar"	Gene Reynolds	Phil Sharp	March 4, 1966	5784-23
New prisoner, Corporal Walter Tillman (J. Pat O'Malley), arrives in camp. The men think he is a bit old for a corporal. Because of the way he acts, Hogan and his men are very suspicious of Tillman. Hogan does not think Tillman will fit in and plans to find a way to have him transferred to another camp. Hogan starts a fire and blames it on Tillman. Klink decides to transfer Tillman. Hogan learns that Tillman is actually General Tillman Walters of the signal corp. Tillman needs Hogan's help to place a radar device so that the Allies can precisely bomb a rocket plant. They did not have much time before the air-raid and Tillman being transferred. The radar device needs to be placed on top of a guard tower. With Helga's help, they distract the guard. Hogan discovers that the location of the radar is six inches off. Tillman will not be able to help as he needs to be smuggled out before he is transferred. Hogan and Newkirk create a diversion and are able to move the radar in time.
25	25	"Psychic Kommandant"	Gene Reynolds	Phil Sharp	March 11, 1966	5784-26
Klink catches the men gambling on a shell game. Hogan tells him it was not gambling but actually an experiment in ESP. Hogan gets Klink to believe that he is psychic. Later, Klink tells Hogan that his men are confined to their barracks for two days due to security reasons. Kinchloe is having a problem with his listening device in Klink's office. Hogan finds a way to get a walkie talkie into Klink's office. They then hear General Burkhalter tell Klink about a new aircraft that will be tested by the camp. Kintzler (Joseph Mell) has developed a silent aircraft that he intends to show off to the Luftwaffe Generals. That night the men get the engine out of the plane and analyze it. They then will get pictures of the engine and notes to the Allies. Klink discovers that the engine is missing and questions Hogan. Hogan tells him the men were confined to the barracks and could not have done anything. Hogan suggests that Burkhalter is testing Klink and he should use his ESP to find the engine. When Hogan and Klink come back to the plane, the engine is there. The next day, Kintzler starts up the plane for the Generals and it shakes and makes a lot of noise.
26	26	"The Prince from the Phone Company"	Gene Reynolds	Richard M. Powell	March 18, 1966	5784-25
The prisoners need cash to process several escapees that have arrived. Meanwhile, African Prince Makabana (Ivan Dixon, in a dual role) just landed in camp. Makabana is negotiating with the Germans for the rights to build a submarine base in his country. Fortunately for Hogan, he looks a lot like Kinchloe. Hogan and his men manage to make the switch between Makabana and Kinchloe. Klink informs Kinchloe that his wife, the Princess Yawanda (Isabelle Cooley), will be arriving soon. When speaking in private, Yawanda tells Kinchloe she knows he is not the Prince. Yawanda says she will not turn Kinchloe in. Count Von Sichel (Lee Bergere) arrives from Berlin to negotiate with the Prince. Kinchloe and Von Sichel come to a deal. Von Sichel wants Kinchloe to call his country about the deal. Because Kinchloe does not speak the language, Yawanda agrees to make the call. With the cash from the deal, Hogan is able to process the escapees. Plus the German subs that were sent to the Prince's country are sunk, putting Von Sichel and the real Prince in trouble. Hogan smuggles Von Sichel and the real Prince out of Germany. Stewart Moss as Captain.
27	27	"The Safecracker Suite"	Howard Morris	Laurence Marks	March 25, 1966	5784-28
Major Hans Kronman (Anthony Eustrel), an old friend of Klink's, arrives at camp. Not long afterwards, Captain Guenther (Booth Colman) from the Gestapo shows up and arrests Kronman. Kronman is suspected of being in on a conspiracy to kill Hitler. Before he is taken away, Kronman slips Hogan a key. Turns out the key is to a hotel safety deposit box. Newkirk tells Hogan that hotel safety deposit boxes are kept in a safe. Newkirk knows of an Alfred Burke (Walter Burke) that could crack the safe. London says they will fly Alfie the Artist over. Hogan cons Klink into helping get Alfie to the hotel. At the hotel, Klink is throwing a party. Captain Guenther makes a surprise visit but finds nothing unusual. Alfie gets the safe open and retrieves the information.
28	28	"I Look Better in Basic Black"	Howard Morris	Arthur Julian	April 1, 1966	5784-27
Klink has ordered that one of barracks become vacant. There will be 3 maximum security American prisoners held there until they can be sent to Berlin. Captain Heinrich arrives with 3 women prisoners. Hogan figures that they must have some very important information. Hogan gets to the barracks and meets Ginger Wilson, Charlene Hemsley (Jackie Joseph) and Kathy Pruitt (Jean Hale). The women were doing an act for the American infantry when an air-raid started. They jumped into a jeep, got lost and stumble upon a secret rocket plant. Before Hogan can get any more information, Newkirk and LeBeau show up to see the women. Then Schultz shows up and then Klink. Captain Heinrich arrives, and not happy with what he sees, he says he is taking the women out of camp the next day. Hogan tells the Allies the location of the rocket plant which will soon be bombed. Hogan had planned to smuggle the girls out until a section of tunnel by their barracks caves in. Hogan comes up with an elaborate plan to get the women out of camp that involves some cross-dressing.
29	29	"The Assassin"	Edward H. Feldman	Richard M. Powell	April 8, 1966	5784-31
General Burkhalter brings to Stalag 13 a Doctor Vanetti (Larry D. Mann) to work on a secret project. Vanetti wants a quiet and safe place to work. Hogan eavesdrops on the conversation. He figures out that Vanetti is a member of the atomic elite and is probably working on an atomic bomb. Hogan tells the men that Vanetti must be killed. Hogan learns of a French assassin that was captured and sent to Stalag 16. Bumbling Colonel Crittendon interferes with the smuggling of the assassin to Stalag 13 and the assassin is recaptured. Crittendon volunteers to kill Vanetti. Before the assassination attempt, Vanetti tells Hogan he wants his help in defecting from Germany. Crittendon does not believe Vanetti's story and still intends to kill him. Hogan comes up with an elaborate plan to rid the camp of Crittendon and also help Vanetti escape to London.
30	30	"Cupid Comes to Stalag 13"	Howard Morris	Phil Sharp	April 15, 1966	5784-29
Hogan and his men are hiding Captain Ferguson (George Tyne) in their tunnels. It's time for him to be bought to the Underground. But his escape is stopped because of Klink wandering around the camp late at night. Klink has a private conversation with Hogan expressing his disappointed in not being promoted. Gen. Burkhalter suggests that Klink consider marriage. Burkhalter says it could help his career. Burkhalter also says that his sister, Gertrude Linkmyer (Kathleen Freeman), and his niece, Lottie, will be coming by the camp and Klink should meet them. The women arrive and Lottie is quite beautiful. Gertrude, not so much. The problem is that both Hogan and Klink think that the prospective bride is Lottie, when it is really Burkhalter's "dragon-lady" sister. Klink seeks love advice from Hogan. Things get confusing until Hogan finds out that Gertrude is the bride to be. Hogan finds a way to get Klink off the hook.
31	31	"The Flame Grows Higher"	Howard Morris	T : Laurence Marks; S/T : David Chandler, Jack H. Robinson	April 22, 1966	5784-30
Prisoner Captain Warren was sent on his way to be picked up by the underground. Suddenly, the Gestapo bring him back to camp. Hogan believes that there is a traitor in the chain of the underground network. Hogan, Newkirk and LeBeau will run the escape route to find who is leaking the information to the Germans. Carter and Kinchloe are sent out of camp to start a forest fire. Hogan convinces Klink to send him, LeBeau and Newkirk to put it out, with Schultz as guard. After a distraction, Hogan, LeBeau and Newkirk make it to the Hauserhof. They meet contacts Eva (Susanne Cramer) and Margit (Hannie Landman). After questioning the women, the men pull a fast one on Schultz and head off to the next stop, a farmhouse. At the farmhouse, Hogan finds elderly farmers Willy (Charles Radilac) and Jenny (Irene Tedrow). Willy knocks Hogan out with a chair, thinking he is a spy. LeBeau and Newkirk show up. After listening to Willy, they realize Eva and Margit are the traitors. Hogan and his men return to the Hauserhof. Schultz shows up and then the Gestapo. Hogan convinces the Gestapo that Schultz captured them and that the women are double agents. The Gestapo take Eva and Margit away.
32	32	"Request Permission to Escape"	Edward H. Feldman	Laurence Marks	April 29, 1966	5784-32
Hogan gets instructions to retrieve a cigarette lighter from Klink's car. It has microfilm with information to fool the German's with. It will make them believe that the Allies will bomb one sight when they will really bomb another. Meanwhile, Carter gets a Dear John letter from his girlfriend, Mary Jane. Carter requests to escape back to the U.S. The men, and even Helga, try to get Carter's mind off of Mary Jane. Hogan gives Carter permission to leave. Carter volunteers for the mission to get the microfilm to the Germans. He tries to tell several German soldiers in a bar that he is an escaped prisoner with valuable information. They think Carter is a Gestapo agent testing them. Even a real Gestapo agent thinks Carter is with them. A waitress named Mady (Mary Mitchel) talks to Carter and cheers him up. Carter does manage to get the Gestapo agent to find the microfilm. Later, the men think Carter is getting ready to head home, but he tells them he is going to see Mady. John Crawford as Captain. William Christopher as German Private. Note: Final appearance of Helga (Cynthia Lynn). Cynthia Lynn would return to the series as two different characters, both uncredited.

=== Season 2 (1966–67) ===
No. overall	No. in season	Title	Directed by	Written by	Original release date	Prod. code
33	1	"Hogan Gives a Birthday Party"	Gene Reynolds	Richard M. Powell	September 16, 1966	5784-36
Two shot-down pilots inform Hogan that Allied planes are having a hard time getting past German defenses to blow up a refinery. Hogan tricks Klink into bringing a bomber crew to Stalag 13 for a research project. Hogan's plan is to have the two pilots return to London in the bomber and also possibly bomb the fuel refinery. General Biedenbender (James Gregory) arrives with the bomber. Hogan is surprised to find out that Biedenbender knows a lot about him and his bombing tactics. He even knows Hogan's birthday is soon. Biedenbender tells Hogan the bomber will have 24 hour guard in case he thought of stealing it. Biedenbender informs Klink he will be leaving sooner than planned. Hogan and his men manage to get on the plane and subdue Biedenbender when he gets on. They bomb the refinery. Hogan and his men parachute back to camp. The two pilots fly back to London with Biedenbender. Sigrid Valdis as Hilda.
34	2	"The Schultz Brigade"	Gene Reynolds	Richard M. Powell	September 23, 1966	5784-33
Schultz posts a sign asking for prisoners to join the Luftwaffe. Hogan thinks the idea should be used to recruit German prisoners to the Allies and call it the Schultz Brigade. Meanwhile, Col. Burmeister (Parley Baer) and Bussie want Klink to join them in a plot to discredit General Burkhalter with the Gestapo. Hogan eavesdrops on the conversation. Burkhalter arrives, knows of their plot and has the three arrested. He says the three will get a fair trial and then will be shot. Hogan, not wanting a new Kommandant, plans to help Klink. At the trial, Hogan is called as a witness. But what Hogan says gets Burmeister and Bussie cleared and Klink is guilty. This is part of Hogan's plan. He will then force Burmeister and Bussie out of the country. Then he has Newkirk and Carter pretend to be them and threaten to kill Burkhalter. Hogan then has Klink save Burkhalter's life and receive a pardon. As Hogan is guiding Burmeister and Bussie to the escape tunnel, he tells them when they get to London, they must form the Schultz Brigade.
35	3	"Diamonds in the Rough"	Gene Reynolds	Laurence Marks	September 30, 1966	5784-34
Milk maiden Myra (Ulla Strömstedt) comes into camp selling milk. She gives a note to Carter who is then supposed to give it to Hogan. Hogan is to meet Myra and an important contact at night in the woods. Hogan is suspicious but decides to go anyway. He meets Myra in the forest and it does turn out to be a trap. Newkirk, Carter and LeBeau show up and the four are brought to the Gestapo. They meet Major Hegel (Paul Lambert), who knows all about Hogan and his operation. He wants one million dollars in diamonds in exchange for his silence. Hogan wants to expose Hegel as a traitor. Hogan finds a way for Klink to overhear a conversation between him and Hegel. London sends Hogan the fake diamonds he requested. Hogan and his men meet with Hegel who informs them that treacherous Myra is dead. Klink and his men show up and Hegel is shot. Later, when questioned by the Secret Police, Hogan comes up with a plausible explanation for Hegel's death.
36	4	"Operation Briefcase"	Gene Reynolds	Laurence Marks	October 7, 1966	5784-35
Hogan receives a message that London will air drop a man code-named Hercules near the camp. Klink tells the prisoners that Gen. Stauffen (Oscar Beregi) will be conducting an inspection of Stalag 13. Unfortunately, Hercules is hit by gun fire as he parachutes from the plane. Hercules is able to tell them that Stauffen is part of a plot to assassinate Hitler. Hercules brought with him a briefcase equipped with a hidden time bomb. The men where to switch briefcases with Stauffen so he gets the one with the bomb. Hercules winds up dying. Stauffen arrives and asks Klink if Hogan could join them for a discussion. The men create several diversions and Hogan is able to switch briefcases. Stauffen is about to leave when Schultz unknowingly arms the bomb. Hogan finds a way to catch up with Stauffen's car. He disarms the bomb with seconds to spare, thus saving Stauffen's life and the mission. Willard Sage as Maj. Gunther. Eddie Firestone as Sgt. Wilson. Note: see Operation Valkyrie.
37	5	"The Battle of Stalag 13"	Bob Sweeney	Richard M. Powell	October 14, 1966	5784-39
Newkirk and LeBeau smuggle Greta (Janine Gray), from the Hammelburg Underground, into camp. She says because of Hogan's success in blowing up local bridges, the Gestapo are all around hindering the Undergrounds work. To add to Hogan's problems, he learns that the Wehrmacht will be stationing officers at the camp. General von Kattenhorn (Jacques Aubuchon) from the Wehrmacht and Colonel Feldkamp (Howard Caine) from the Gestapo come to Klink's office. Both von Kattenhorn and Feldkamp demand the use of Stalag 13 for their own purposes. Hogan does what he can to pit the two German officers against each other, including stealing their cars. Klink, unfortunately, is caught in the middle. Fearing Feldkamp has detained Greta, Hogan and his men wear Wehrmacht uniforms and head to town. Hogan manages to free Greta and the other underground members being held. Hogan and the men then load the officers' cars with explosives and return them.
38	6	"The Rise and Fall of Sergeant Schultz"	Gene Reynolds	Laurence Marks	October 21, 1966	5784-40
London orders Hogan and his men to free a prisoner named Becker from the Gestapo. Becker is a member of the Underground and has a lot of information that could get Hogan and everyone in trouble. Their first attempt fails, but they learn that Becker will be transferred to a hotel in town. London orders them to try again. Schultz tells the men that Gen. Kammler (Whit Bissell) is coming to inspect the camp. Kammler recognizes Schultz. They served together in the 1st World War and Schultz saved his life. Kammler wants Klink to take good care of Schultz. Hogan pulls a stunt that makes it look as though Schultz prevented an escape. Hogan tells Klink that Schultz is a hero. They should invite Kammler back and have a party for Schultz at the hotel. At the party, Kammler awards Schultz the Iron Cross. Hogan and the men create a diversion and free Becker. Laurie Main as Col. Franz.
39	7	"Hogan Springs"	Gene Reynolds	Laurence Marks	October 28, 1966	5784-41
Hogan receives orders to free four Underground leaders from the Nazis that night. Hogan's men manage to get the four men and smuggle them into camp. But just when they try to get the men through the escape tunnel, a leaky pipe fills it with water and mud. Kinchloe is able to plug the leak but now the water comes spraying up above ground. If the guards start digging there, they will find out about the tunnel. Hogan finds a way to convince Klink that the water is from a mineral spring and has healing powers. He even talks Klink into building a bath house and to invite General Burkhalter down for a visit. Burkhalter arrives for the dedication of the bath house. Using a steam bath as a distraction, Hogan is able to get the four men German uniforms. They are able to drive out of camp and then to a pick up point. Carter brings the car and the uniforms back. Sidney Clute as Sparrow.
40	8	"A Klink, a Bomb and a Short Fuse"	Edward H. Feldman	Phil Sharp	November 4, 1966	5784-38
Klink has a new code book that the men take from his office and quickly photograph the pages. Klink notices the book missing and wants the men searched. The men manage to get the book into Klink's coat pocket. Just then, Gen. Burkhalter arrives in camp. When he is about to develop the film, Carter notices he forgot to load the camera with film. Burkhalter tells Klink that there may be Allied radio signals coming from around camp. Burkhalter brings with him a radio detection unit. Hogan has to come up with a way to get the code book again and be able to radio the contents safely out of camp. While playing on Klink's ego, Hogan finds a way to photograph the code book. Hogan then comes up the idea to put a fake bomb in the camp yard as a distraction. Then they can send out a radio signal. Hogan tells Klink and Burkhalter that he will disarm the bomb. Burkhalter leaves camp. The only problem is that Carter got trapped in the tunnel with the fake bomb and the one in the courtyard is real. Kinchloe tells Hogan it is a real bomb. Despite not knowing what he is doing, Hogan disarms the bomb.
41	9	"Tanks for the Memory"	Gene Reynolds	Laurence Marks	November 11, 1966	5784-42
Newkirk is on a reconnaissance mission and a romantic rendezvous when he sees a new radio-controlled mini tank being tested. Klink learns that General Burkhalter has ordered that the tank will do further testing at Stalag 13. Hogan comes up with a plan to run a fake contest to find the best kept POW camp in Germany. Klink tells Hogan to have his men clean up the camp. The mini tank arrives in camp. Under the guise of cleaning up, Hogan's men are able to dig a tunnel to the barracks where the tank will be stored. The men sneak into the barracks, inspect the tank and take pictures of it. They then take the control box out of the tank to have a look at it. Burkhalter shows up and heads to the barracks. There is no time to re-wire the control box, so the men take it with them. Hogan puts LeBeau in the tank to drive it for the test. When the tank is behind a building, LeBeau gets out and the men put explosives in it. The tank is then destroyed. Hogan gets the pictures and the control box to the Allies.
42	10	"A Tiger Hunt in Paris: Part 1"	Bob Sweeney	Richard M. Powell	November 18, 1966	5784-44
Klink informs the prisoners that he will be taking a weeks leave in Paris. Schultz will be going with him. Hogan gets a tip that the Germans are building a secret underground fighter base near the camp. Tiger (Arlene Martel), a female underground agent, is coming to help the men find the base. Hogan finds out that Tiger has been captured by the Gestapo. She knows all about the underground operation including Stalag 13. It's just a matter of time before the Gestapo extract the information from her. Hogan and LeBeau become stowaways aboard Klink's staff car and head for Paris to free her. Hogan, using the name Frank Dirken, makes contact with Colonel Backscheider (John Dehner) from the Gestapo. Hogan tells Backscheider that he is in the black market and the two could make a lot of money. He learns that Backscheider has a fascination with astrology. Hogan is allowed to speak with Tiger and she tells him to make contact with Marya, a White Russian spy posing as an astrologist. George N. Neise as Captain Mueller Note: First appearance of Marya (Nita Talbot).
43	11	"A Tiger Hunt in Paris: Part 2"	Bob Sweeney	Richard M. Powell	November 25, 1966	5784-45
Marya is willing to help Hogan free Tiger, but her price is the location of the secret fighter bases in Germany. Also, she told Backscheider that she predicts an important man is coming to see him. Hogan calls Kinchloe and asks the men to find the bases. But, Kinchloe tells Hogan with Klink and Schultz gone, the camp is on a lock down. Hogan gets Backscheider to believe that the important man is Heinrich Himmler. Backscheider wonders what he has done that Himmler would want to see him, so he consults Marya. Schultz tells Hogan that Klink has been arrested by the Gestapo. Hogan asks Marya is she can find a look-alike for Himmler. Marya brings in Antonovich (Henry Corden) to pose as Himmler. With Antonovich's help, Hogan is able to free Tiger and Klink and get the maps to the fighter bases.
44	12	"Will the Real Adolf Please Stand Up?"	Gene Reynolds	Laurence Marks	December 2, 1966	5784-47
Hogan and the men are to intercept a German officer, Major Krantz (Forrest Compton). He is carrying plans for German defensive installations at English Channel ports. Underground agent Christina is to help stop Krantz's car and get him to a local tavern. There, Kinchloe is able to photograph the plans and return them without Krantz knowing. Klink informs Hogan that because of recent escapes at other Stalags, he is increasing security. Hogan will not be able to get the pictures to an underground courier. Hogan tries to get Klink to divert some of the guards, but it backfires and Klink will add even more. Hogan then has Carter dress up and impersonate Hitler. Carter is then to drive out of camp with the film. When Carter starts to overdo his acting, Hogan comes out to stop him. General Burkhalter then shows up. But, believing Hitler is angry with his Generals, Burkhalter quickly leaves. Carter is then able to leave with the film. William Christopher as Foster.
45	13	"Don't Forget to Write"	Gene Reynolds	Laurence Marks	December 9, 1966	5784-46
Schultz tells Hogan that Klink is in a meeting with Colonel Bessler (Sandy Kenyon), a personnel officer from the Luftwaffe. Hogan eavesdrops as Klink brags to Bessler about his early career as a bomber pilot. Due to Klink's arrogance, he is easily tricked into volunteering for combat at the Russian front. Klink will receive a physical examination in a week. Hogan figures if Klink does not pass his physical, he might not be transferred. Hogan and the men do what they can to weaken Klink and get him out of shape. The Luftwaffe Doctor (George Tyne) arrives and examines Klink. Despite being in terrible condition, Klink passes because he is still breathing. An extremely strict Captain Fritz Gruber (Dick Wilson) is assigned command of Stalag 13. With the help of a staged escape and a recapture of the prisoners by Klink, Hogan manages to discredit Gruber. General Burkhalter rescinds Klinks transfer.
46	14	"Klink's Rocket"	Bob Sweeney	Art Baer, Ben Joelson	December 16, 1966	5784-50
Klink tells the prisoners that the Luftwaffe will be bombing London. Hogan comes up with a plan to convince the Germans to bomb a decoy rocket gun factory in Leadingham, England. The Allies will then be able to shoot down the German planes. Hogan mentions to Klink that the Allies are developing a new rocket gun. The men also set it up so Schultz finds Billett (John Orchard) hanging by a parachute in a tree. Carter is then to tell Klink that Billet was carrying part of the new gun and mention the factory is in Leadingham. Instead of interrogating Carter, Klink gives him gourmet food. Klink is waiting for General Von Lintzer (Harold Gould) to arrive before asking Carter any questions. Von Lintzer asks Carter where the factory is, but Carter cannot remember the name of the town. Hogan has to go to Klink's office and give them the name Leadingham. Hogan later learns that the trap worked and a large number of German planes were shot down.
47	15	"Information Please"	Edward H. Feldman	Laurence Marks	December 23, 1966	5784-37
Klink is going away on a trip to see Gen. Burkhalter. Meanwhile, Hogan and the men are keeping a shot down RAF Lieutenant (Don Knight) until they can get him safely back to London. A German spy in London sends word to Burkhalter that intelligence reports are being sent from the Stalag 13 area. Burkhalter will have Klink plant some false information in Stalag 13 and see if the Allies act on it. That will prove the leak is coming from there. Hogan and the men fall for the bait. Hogan eavesdrops on Klink and Burkhalter and finds out that he was tricked. Later, Burkhalter tells Major Kohler (John Stephenson) that he will plant a spy among the prisoners. He will send Lieutenant James Crandall (Sam Melville), whose real name is Schmidt. Klink will not be told he is a spy. Crandall arrives and Hogan thinks he may be a spy. The men pull a little stunt and find out Crandall is a German. They make Crandall believe that Kohler is the traitor. Burkhalter arrests Kohler. Hogan has the RAF Lieutenant take Crandall as a prisoner back to London.
48	16	"Art for Hogan's Sake"	Gene Reynolds	Laurence Marks	December 30, 1966	5784-43
Burkhalter brings Manet's The Boy with the Fife to camp for safe keeping. He wants to give it as a gift for Göring's birthday. Burkhalter tells Klink that nothing should happen to the painting. LeBeau finds out about the painting, sneaks into Klink's office and steals it. Hogan leads Klink to believe the painting was destroyed. Hogan suggests that Klink let him and LeBeau go to Paris to have a copy of the painting made. Klink agrees and will have Schultz and Langenscheidt (Jon Cedar) go with them. Once in Paris, Hogan gets Schultz to dress as a general. Schultz finds out that the painting was not destroyed when he sees Hogan brought it with him. But Hogan has a way to keep Schultz quiet about it. Hogan and LeBeau meet up with Verlaine, who will make the copy of the painting. The Gestapo show up to Verlaine's house. "General" Schultz gets them to leave. They all return to camp with the copy and Verlaine will protect the original. Burkhalter suspects that the painting is fake. LeBeau tells Burkhalter it is a copy. LeBeau also tells him that he knows that Göring already has the original. John Crawford as 1st Gestapo Man.
49	17	"The General Swap"	Gene Reynolds	R.S. Allen, Harvey Bullock	January 6, 1967	5784-48
Gen. Aloysius Barton (Frank Gerstle) was shot down and brought as a prisoner to Stalag 13. He will be under heavy guard. Field Marshal von Heinke (John Myhers) is to arrive the next day to take pictures with the important prisoner. London sends a message that Barton must be freed. To make things easier to free Barton, Hogan tries to convince Klink that he is not really Gen. Barton. Hogan and Klink confront Barton, but he insists he is who he says he is and he calls Hogan a traitor. London says Barton must be freed at any cost. Hogan says they should kidnap von Heinke and swap him for Barton. The men capture von Heinke and bring him to camp. Hogan gets von Heinke to believe that he is in London and he should radio Stalag 13 to make a prisoner exchange. They then drug von Heinke and the swap is set for the next day.
50	18	"The Great Brinksmeyer Robbery"	Bob Sweeney	Phil Sharp	January 13, 1967	5784-52
In a covert air drop, Hogan and the men receive 100,000 Marks. The money is to be given to Ludwig Strasser (Theodore Marcuse) for a map with the location of new rocket launching sites. Klink comes by suddenly and Newkirk hides the money in the stove. Because of something Klink does, the money is burned up. Hogan informs Strasser that they do not have the money right now, but will get it soon. The plan is to rob a local bank. Hogan, Newkirk, and LeBeau provoke Klink into throwing them into solitary. From there they escape into town and check out the Brinksmeyer Bank. The bank is heavily protected. LeBeau gets blueprints that show that an adjacent apartment building could give them access to the bank vault. Hogan goes to the apartment of Mady Pfeiffer (Joyce Jameson) to check things out. He gets her drunk and she passes out. LeBeau and Newkirk get into the vault through the bedroom wall. They get the money and put Mady's wall back together. Hogan gets the map and they get back to solitary before Klink finds out.
51	19	"Praise the Führer and Pass the Ammunition"	Bob Sweeney	Jack Elinson	January 20, 1967	5784-51
SS Colonel Deutsch (Frank Marth) comes by the camp and informs Klink that his regiment will be performing war games in the area. Hogan comes up with the idea to replace some of the blank ammunition with live ammo. Hogan then learns from Schultz that it's Klink's birthday. To create a diversion so they can swap the ammunition, Hogan will have the men put on a show for Klink's birthday. That evening, Newkirk, LeBeau and Kinchloe perform for Klink, Deutsch and the men. Hogan is able to swap the ammunition. The next day, Klink gets a call and learns about the casualties.
52	20	"Hogan and the Lady Doctor"	Gene Reynolds	Laurence Marks	January 27, 1967	5784-49
Hogan must swallow his pride and better judgment when a civilian scientist is put in charge of his team for a sabotage operation in a synthetic fuel plant. Kinchloe arrives with Dr. Suzanne Lechay (Ruta Lee), a scientist. Newkirk and Carter check out the plant and find it heavily fortified. Hogan nixes the mission because it is too risky. But he is overruled by Lechay. The plan then is to have Lechay captured by Klink. General Burkhalter and Klink will find out she is a chemical scientist and force her to help at the plant. When the Gestapo get involved, Hogan thinks it's too dangerous, but Lechay insists on going through with the plan. With the help of Gestapo uniforms, Hogan finds a way for him, Carter and LeBeau to join Lechay in the plant. They set up the explosives and barely escape some other Gestapo agents when the plant explodes. Hogan then makes sure Lechay escapes back to London. Curt Lowens as Gestapo Captain.
53	21	"The Swing Shift"	Edward H. Feldman	Art Baer, Ben Joelson	February 3, 1967	5784-54
General Burkhalter arrives in camp with civilian Hans Spear (Hal Smith). Hans is an expert at converting factories into making war products. They are turning a local car factory into producing cannons. Hogan and his men are eavesdropping on the conversation. London is too backlogged with other bombing targets to deal with this factory. Dressed as German workers, Hogan and the crew get into the factory to plan some sabotage. After discovering a large cache of gun powder, they decide to blow up the factory. Things are going well until Newkirk is drafted into the German army. Newkirk and some other men will be sent to Stalag 13 as guards. Before Newkirk can be transferred, Hogan finds a way to have Hans get him back to the factory. Carter rigs the detonator, and the men leave after their shift. Later the factory blows up. Otto Waldis as doctor.
54	22	"Heil Klink"	Edward H. Feldman	Richard M. Powell	February 10, 1967	5784-55
The Gestapo is hot on the trail of Wolfgang Brauner (John Banner, in a dual role), a financial genius who was talked into defecting. Brauner had been hiding with Agent Tiger. Hogan comes up with a plan to have Brauner drive into Stalag 13 pretending to be Hitler in disguise. Hogan convinces Klink that the Führer's life is in danger and he will be hiding at Stalag 13. Klink is given orders that Hitler is to be seen by no one except Hogan, who will serve as his food taster. Gestapo Major Hochstetter arrives and questions Klink about the man who just came into camp. Hochstetter thinks it's Brauner. Hogan gets Klink to believe that Hochstetter is there to kill Hitler. Klink refuses to let Hochstetter see the man. Carter, impersonating Hitler's voice, convinces Klink that he wishes to step down and he is naming Klink as his successor. With his new found confidence, Klink arrests Hochstetter. Klink gets a call from Berlin and finds out Hitler is there. Meanwhile, Hogan's men make Brauner look like Schultz. Brauner gets into a staff car with a disguised Tiger driving and leaves camp. Hogan helps Hochstetter and Klink come up with a story as to how Brauner went missing. Note: First appearance of Major Hochstetter (Howard Caine).
55	23	"Everyone Has a Brother-in-Law"	Edward H. Feldman	Laurence Marks	February 17, 1967	5784-56
Carter, Newkirk and LeBeau are rigging a train track in order to blow up a munitions train. They then find out from Underground agent Eva that the train will not pass by there that night. The men hide things and return to camp. Hogan hears from London that it will be some time before the train moves. General Burkhalter comes to camp with Captain Kurtz (Cliff Norton), his brother-in-law. Kurtz will be Klink's new adjutant. Kurtz is strict, efficient and ambitious, which will cause problems for the prisoners. It will be very difficult, if not impossible, to get men out to blow up the train. Kurtz speaks privately with Hogan. He tells Hogan that his strictness is just to impress Klink and that he intends on defecting to the Allies. To prove it, he will help a prisoner escape. Newkirk tries to escape and Kurtz and Klink capture him. Kurtz explains to Hogan that he had no choice because one of the guards started asking questions. Hogan no longer trusts Kurtz. When word comes that the train is about to take off, Hogan comes up with a plan to use Kurtz. The two go to the location of the bombs under the guise of meeting some Underground agents. As Hogan expected, Kurtz double crosses him but Hogan gets Kurtz to unknowingly set off the bombs. Later, Hogan tells Burkhalter and Klink that Kurtz was killed in the explosion. But, he really will be sent to a London POW camp.
56	24	"Killer Klink"	Bob Sweeney	Harvey Bullock, R.S. Allen	February 24, 1967	5784-53
Hogan needs to deliver radio parts to the underground in Heidelberg. Hogan then learns that Schultz lives there and is going there on a three day pass. Hogan gives Schultz a sob story about a girl he knows in Heidelberg. Schultz agrees to take a gift, which would be secretly containing the parts, to her address. But Schultz gets into an argument with his wife and tears up his pass. Hogan talks Schultz into asking Klink for another pass, but Klink refuses. Klink then orders Schultz to endless marching as punishment. Hogan convinces Klink to send Schultz for a physical after all that marching. But Hogan substitutes a friends elderly father for Schultz. Doctor Pohlmann (Parley Baer) tells Klink that Schultz is suffering from pre-mature aging and that he may not have much time left. Pohlmann suggests that Schultz go on a long furlough. Schultz gets his pass and delivers Hogan's gift. When Schultz returns from leave, Klink is surprised to see him alive. Schultz gets into trouble when Klink finds out he never took the physical.
57	25	"Reverend Kommandant Klink"	Gene Reynolds	T : Richard M. Powell; S/T : Art Baer, Ben Joelson	March 3, 1967	5784-59
FAFL Lt. Claude Boucher's (Felice Orlandi) plane was shot down and he is brought to camp. Hogan and the men eaves drop on Gestapo Major Hochstetter's interrogation of Boucher. Hochstetter tells Boucher that his fiancee, Suzanne Martine, has given up on him. Hogan fears that Boucher believes Hochstetter and his resistance is wearing down. Hogan plans to bring Suzanne to camp and have Klink marry her and Boucher. LeBeau heads to Paris to retrieve Suzanne. Hogan gets Hochstetter to agree to let Boucher be in a play the men will be putting on. Then Hogan drugs Boucher to prevent further interrogation. LeBeau arrives with Suzanne. The men prepare for the play. It will be a wedding scene and Boucher is to marry Hilda. Right before the play starts, Suzanne switches places with Hilda. Klink performs the ceremony and Boucher realizes it's Suzanne. The next day, Hochstetter thinks something is suspicious, but still gets no information out of Boucher.
58	26	"The Most Escape-Proof Camp I've Ever Escaped From"	Edward H. Feldman	Bill Davenport	March 10, 1967	5784-57
A message from London says the men need to smuggle underground agent Huebler with important information into camp the following night. General Burkhalter and SS Colonel Stieffer arrive. They bring with them RAF Sgt. Malcolm Flood (Mickey Manners). He has been systematically escaping his way out of every stalag in Germany for fame and glory. Burkhalter wants Klink to make sure he does not escape from Stalag 13. Hogan must convince Flood to stay behind bars before he ruins the team's operation. But when Hogan goes to talk to him in his cell, Flood is already gone. Flood turns up in Hogan's office. Hogan orders Flood confined to the barracks, but he escapes anyway. Schultz tells Klink and Stieffer that Flood is no longer in his cell. Hogan gets Klink to let him use a truck to look for Flood, but Hogan actually retrieves Agent Huebler and brings him into camp. They then radio London with the important info and find a way to get Huebler out of camp. Flood has a change of heart and comes back to camp. Stieffer says Flood will be turned over to the Gestapo where there is no escape. Later, Flood winds up in the men's barracks.
59	27	"The Tower"	Gene Reynolds	Laurence Marks	March 17, 1967	5784-60
LeBeau, Newkirk and Kinchloe are to meet an underground agent named Lili. She shows them a new radio tower near camp. Lili also mentions that a courier dropped off information about the tower to Klink. Gen. Burkhalter and Captain Berger (Willard Sage) arrive at camp. Burkhalter wants Klink to have his men guard this very important tower. If anything happens to it, Burkhalter will hold Klink personably responsible. Hogan and his men are eavesdropping on the conversation. Despite her objections, Hogan has Lili write an admiring letter to Klink. Hogan then talks Klink into having Lili and Burkhalter come to camp for dinner. Kinchloe manages to take some compromising pictures of Lili and Burkhalter. The men then blow up the tower. Hogan uses the pictures to blackmail Burkhalter so Klink will not be punished for the destruction of the tower.
60	28	"Colonel Klink's Secret Weapon"	Gene Reynolds	Phil Sharp	March 24, 1967	5784-58
Lt. Bigelow (Stewart Moss) just makes it through the tunnels, with important information, before one collapses. An Inspector General (John Stephenson) has visited the camp and gives it a near-failing grade. To improve the camp's inspection rating, Klink brings in Sgt. Reinhold Franks (Milton Selzer), an efficiency expert. The prisoners quickly learn how strict and by the book Franks is. Franks is even strict with the German soldiers, putting Schultz on report. Klink thinks Franks is doing a wonderful job until Franks puts him on report for having some paperwork weeks behind. It's not long before staff and prisoners alike want to get rid of Franks. Hogan learns from contact Max (Sidney Clute) that Bigelow did not come out the other end of the tunnel. Klink asks Hogan's help in getting Franks out of camp. Franks tells Hogan that the Inspector General is coming back and Franks expects to get the credit for improving things. Meanwhile, the men dig Bigelow out of the tunnel. Hogan comes up with a plan to have both Franks and Bigelow leave camp. When the Inspector shows up, the camp is in disarray. The Inspector will have Franks taken away by the Gestapo. Bigelow, dressed as a Gestapo agent, takes Franks away.
61	29	"The Top Secret Top Coat"	Howard Morris	Bill Davenport	March 31, 1967	5784-61
Hogan receives a mission where he must attend Baron Von Aukburg's party under the guise of Klink. The Baron has complete plans for Operation Dragonfly that he will turn over to Hogan. Hogan has Hilda intercept Klink's invitation. Burkhalter comes by and asks Klink why he was invited to the party. Klink says he never got an invitation, but Burkhalter says the Gestapo showed him the guest list. The Gestapo believes that the Baron is selling information to the Allies. Hogan and his men are eavesdropping on this conversation. London says there 'i no way to contact the Baron to have him cancel the party. Klink and Burkhalter go to the party. Hogan learns that the maid at the party, thinking it was him, put the plans in Klink's overcoat. Back at camp, Burkhalter tells Klink that the Gestapo will be questioning him the next day. Burkhalter also says that Von Aukburg has disappeared and was never at the party. Hogan has Carter dress as a Gestapo agent and go to Klink's office. Hogan's scheme gets the plans from Klink's coat and makes Klink look good in the eyes of Burkhalter and the real Gestapo agent.
62	30	"The Reluctant Target"	Bob Sweeney	Phil Sharp	April 7, 1967	5784-63
Hogan and underground agent Pierre (Theodore Marcuse) have information about German troop movements. While trying to leave the camp, something goes wrong and Pierre is captured. When LeBeau tries to retrieve Pierre's gun that they hid, a shot fires through Klink's window. This gives Hogan an idea. Hogan has Carter set up an explosion near Klink. Hogan then convinces Klink that someone is out to kill him. Hogan gets Klink to switch uniforms under the guise that it will be easier to catch the assassin with Hogan as a decoy. With Klink hiding and the guards watching him, it will be easy to get Pierre out of camp. Things get complicated when SS General Brenner (Larry D. Mann) comes to talk to Klink. Thinking Hogan is Klink, Brenner tells him that there will be a special meeting at his camp. The next day, Brenner and Field Marshall Von Galter (John Hoyt) arrive. Hogan has the office bugged and listens into the conversation. Hogan is able to have Pierre escape with the new information. Plus, he convinces Klink to not be concerned with Pierre's disappearance. Note: Sgt. Kinchloe (Ivan Dixon) does not appear in this episode.

=== Season 3 (1967–68) ===
No. overall	No. in season	Title	Directed by	Written by	Original release date	Prod. code
63	1	"The Crittendon Plan"	Gene Reynolds	Richard M. Powell	September 9, 1967	5784-65
London wants Hogan to blow-up a convoy carrying rocket fuel through a secret underground tunnel. Hogan thinks it will be too risky for his men. London says that a plan to accomplish the mission is in the head of Colonel Crittendon, who is a prisoner in Stalag 16. Hogan remembers Crittendon as being incompetent. Hogan and Carter start out to free Crittendon. Kinchloe then hears from London that they've made a mistake. The Crittendon Hogan should be freeing is in Stalag 2. Hogan and Carter do free Crittendon and ask him about his plan. Clumsy Crittendon's plan is to plant geraniums along the runways of the British fighter planes. When meeting up with some Underground agents, Hogan tries to pass off Clumsy Crittendon as the other one. But Agent Carla (Victoria Vetri) finds out that Crittendon is not the right one. Hogan then improvises another plan. There are some complications, but the tunnel and convoy get blown up. Naomi Stevens as Nadya. Laurie Main as Major Shawcross. Cliff Osmond as Marko. Note: Newkirk (Richard Dawson) does not appear in this episode.
64	2	"Some of Their Planes Are Missing"	Gene Reynolds	Laurence Marks	September 16, 1967	5784-66
Six Luftwaffe pilots arrive at Stalag 13. Hogan learns that they have been training to fly RAF planes. General Burkhalter and Col. Richard Leman (John Doucette) explain to the pilots their mission. They are to fly among other RAF planes and shoot them down. Hogan and the men are eavesdropping on the conversation. Hogan flatters Leman into getting an invitation to a party that Klink and the other officers are having. Hogan pretends to pass out from drinking, then has Olsen switch places with him, giving Hogan an alibi. Hogan, Carter and LeBeau dress like German officers and head to the location of the planes. They meet up with some Underground agents along the way. The planes get blown up and Hogan gets back to the party in time to maintain his alibi. Note: Newkirk does not appear in this episode.
65	3	"D-Day at Stalag 13"	Gene Reynolds	Richard M. Powell	September 23, 1967	5784-67
Hogan is in London and is speaking with a British General (J. Pat O'Malley) about the impending Normandy Invasion. The Germans know that there is something in the works and Hitler's general staff will be meeting at Stalag 13. Hogan has orders to make contact with Lilli von Scheider (Gail Kobe), who is married to General von Scheider (Harold Gould). Before she married, she was an undercover Allied agent, but they lost contact with her. The Allies are not sure she can be trusted anymore. Back at camp, Hogan has Kinchloe impersonate Hitler on a phone call. He says he is fed up with his Generals not following his orders. He will pick the most incompetent colonel, but one who can follow orders, to be his new Chief of Staff. The von Scheiders arrive and Hogan makes contact with Lilli. She agrees to help Hogan. Hogan also informs her that she will be sent back to London. Carter dresses as a Gestapo agent and tells Klink, in front of the other Generals at the meeting, that he will be the new Chief of Staff. The other Generals are not pleased with the decision. To keep them off their toes, Kinchloe, as Hitler, informs von Scheider that he is the new Commandant of Stalag 13. The Generals learn of the invasion, but Klink does not know what to do and the others will not help him. Because of their indecision, the invasion is a success and Lilli happily leaves for London. John Hoyt as General Bruner. Ivan Triesault as General von Katz. Timeline: While the episode is set during the first week of June 1944, the Heroes and the Germans are, as always, wearing the standard winter wardrobe.
66	4	"Sergeant Schultz Meets Mata Hari"	Gene Reynolds	Laurence Marks	September 30, 1967	5784-70
Maj. Hochstetter (Howard Caine) tells Klink about a top secret plant that will produce a new armor piercing shell not far from the camp. Hochstetter says that the area around Stalag 13 is not secure enough because there has been a lot of sabotage there. Hochstetter and some Gestapo agents search Hogan's barracks, but they find nothing. Back at his office, Hochstetter tells Gestapo agent Eva Mueller (Joyce Jameson) that he is still suspicious. He wants Eva to get close to Schultz and hopefully find out important information from him. Eva befriends Schultz at a local tavern. Meanwhile, Underground agent Kurt (Sidney Clute) is brought to Hogan. Kurt tells them about the new plant. Schultz tells Hogan about Eva and that he has a date with her. He also mentions that she asks a lot of questions about the camp. Hogan tells his men that he believes Eva is Gestapo. Carter goes to the tavern to check on Schultz and Eva and confirms she is Gestapo. Hogan gets Kurt to pretend he is Gestapo and arrests Eva. Kurt tells Schultz she is a spy. Hogan detains Eva in the tunnels and sends some of his men to bomb the plant. They leave Eva's handbag at the scene. This leads Hochstetter to believe Eva was a double agent. Kurt takes Eva to a POW camp in England.
67	5	"Funny Thing Happened on the Way to London"	Gene Reynolds	Laurence Marks	October 7, 1967	5784-69
Hochstetter arrives in camp with an RAF Group Captain. Hogan recognizes him as Capt. James Roberts (Lloyd Bochner), an old friend of his. Hogan and the men eavesdrop on Hochstetter's and Klink's conversation and find out there is a plan to assassinate Winston Churchill. Hogan demands to see Roberts and is surprised when Klink says he can. While talking to Roberts, Hogan finds a bug in the room. He tells his men that there is something suspicious going on. The men eavesdrop on a conversation between Hochstetter, Klink and Roberts. Roberts is the one that will get to Churchill. The men think Roberts has sold out to the Germans. Hochstetter will have Hogan help Roberts escape from camp. But then the men find out that the man Hochstetter was talking to is actually Lt. Baumann, an exact double for Roberts. Newkirk and Kinchloe free Roberts from his cell and he goes to the Germans, who thinks he is Baumann, and they will take him to Churchill. Hogan then sets up Baumann to be captured by Schultz, who thinks he is Roberts trying to escape. By the time Hochstetter figures out what happened, Churchill will be safe.
68	6	"Casanova Klink"	Edward H. Feldman	Bill Davenport	October 14, 1967	5784-68
General Burkhalter and Gestapo agent Hugo Hindmann (Woodrow Parfrey) are in Klink's office discussing a secret mission to take place in a few days. Klink also learns that Hindmann has infiltrated the German Underground. Hogan and his men are eavesdropping on the conversation. Hindmann will leave some papers in Klink's safe that could help end the Underground. With Hilda away, Burkhalter tells Klink he'll get him another secretary. The next day, Burkhalter brings his sister Gertrude Linkmeyer (Kathleen Freeman) (who calls her brother, “Albert”). Burkhalter is also determined to marry off his sister to Klink. Hogan needs to get into Klink's safe, but Gertrude being around is making that difficult. Hogan finds a way for Klink to take Gertrude out to dinner. The men try to get into the safe, but do not have enough time. Hogan gets Klink to take out Gertrude again and this time they get the information from the safe. Hogan and the men are able to have the Underground catch Hindmann, stop the Gestapo secret mission and destroy an ammo dump. Hogan manages to get Gertrude to lose interest in Klink.
69	7	"How to Win Friends and Influence Nazis"	Bob Sweeney	Phil Sharp	October 21, 1967	5784-74
Burkhalter has a meeting with Klink and Hogan listens in on the conversation. But there is interference and the men cannot make out what was said. Hogan tricks Klink into revealing that Swedish scientist Karl Svenson (Karl Swenson) will be coming to the camp. Svenson is developing a formula for a metal that is stronger and lighter than steel. Hogan must prevent Svenson from giving the formula to the Germans, so they decide to terminate him. Hogan and the men get to town where Svenson is staying and Hogan talks to him. Svenson tells him that he is on neither side and is just working to end the war for everyone. Hogan decides to try to bring Svenson to the Allied side instead of his original plan. Hogan finds Svenson's one weakness and it is women. Svenson would like to meet lounge singer, Magda Tischler (Doris Singleton). Hogan comes up with a way to get the two together. Days later, Burkhalter and Gestapo Agent Grosser tell Klink that since meeting Magda, Svenson has stopped working on his formula. Magda and Karl arrive at camp and tell Hogan they want to marry. Grosser has Klink arrest the couple and is about to drive off. Hogan places a bomb in Grosser's car. In the confusion after the blast, Hogan gets Karl and Magda to his escape tunnel. Hogan then gives Burkhalter and Klink a plausible explanation for their disappearance.
70	8	"Nights in Shining Armor"	Gene Reynolds	Laurence Marks	October 28, 1967	5784-71
The Allies are forced to drop a load of bullet-proof vests outside of Stalag 13. The whole load is too heavy to bring back to camp, so Hogan, Newkirk and LeBeau must bury them there. The next morning, French Officer Maurice Dubois (Felice Orlandi) surrenders to Klink. He tells LeBeau he is there to pick up the vests for the French Resistance. London informs Hogan that they can trust Dubois. Klink needs a plumber. As a way to get Dubois out of solitary, Hogan tells Klink that Dubois is a plumber. The plan now is to make Klink think that Dubois also came up with a better way to make bullet-proof vests. Dubois tells Klink that he will let Klink take the credit for the invention in exchange for his freedom. Klink shows Burkhalter the vest and Burkhalter says that he will take the credit when he shows the vests to Berlin. Hogan and his men find a way to get Dubois out of camp with the vests.
71	9	"Hot Money"	Bob Sweeney	Laurence Marks	November 4, 1967	5784-64
There is something going on with one of the buildings in camp. Hogan would like to find out what it is. Schultz is gambling with the men and has a lot of US dollars. He also has a lot of English Pounds. The men figure out that the money is counterfeit. Hogan learns that the Germans are printing the money in the suspicious building because no one will bomb a POW camp. They intend to flood the world market with the money. Newkirk tells Klink and SS Major Bock (Sandy Kenyon) that he would like to help print the money. Bock does not trust Newkirk and sends him out. Bock tells Klink not to mention this incident in his report. It would show a breach of security and Bock himself would probably be killed. Hogan and the men eavesdrop on the conversation and record it. They then doctor the recording. The plan is to make Herman Stoffel (Jon Cedar), the lead printer, think that his life is in danger. With Stoffel's help, the men find a way to destroy all the printing equipment. Note: This is the first of two episodes that were held over from the second season.
72	10	"One in Every Crowd"	Bob Sweeney	Laurence Marks	November 11, 1967	5784-76
Newkirk and unpopular POW Jack Williams (Paul Picerni) get into a fight when Newkirk catches Jack cheating at cards. Captain Hermann (John Crawford) tells Klink he has to store a secret weapon at Stalag 13 until his truck can be repaired. Hogan is eavesdropping on the conversation. Williams tells Carter that he is going to break out of camp that night. Hogan gets word he is to destroy the weapon. Williams does try to escape but is caught by Schultz. He believes that Hogan tipped off the Germans. Williams tells Klink he has important information, but in exchange, he wants his freedom. Hogan and the men are listening in and fear that Williams will sell out Hogan's entire operation. Hogan brings in Underground agent Felix (John Stephenson) to help. Hogan gets Klink to believe he needs to go to Berlin. Felix will pretend to be Maj. Weber and take temporary command of the camp. Felix tells Williams that he has a deal for his freedom. Williams gives Felix all the information he has. He then signs what he thinks is that information, but is actually fake information. Thanks to the fake information, Hogan is able to blow up the secret weapon while having Williams freed from the cooler. He has Williams sent to London with Felix to be tried as a traitor while telling Williams that he'd better pray that one of the judges isn't a former POW. Using Williams' jacket, Hogan fools Klink and Hermann into thinking that Williams died in the explosion. Barbara Babcock guest stars as Maria Schmidt. Note: Ivan Dixon does not appear in this episode.
73	11	"Is General Hammerschlag Burning?"	Edward H. Feldman	Richard M. Powell	November 18, 1967	5784-72
French resistance fighter Maurice Dubois arrives at Stalag 13. He tells Hogan and the men that General Hammerschlag (Paul Lambert) has the master plan for the defense of Paris. If Paris cannot be defended, Hitler has ordered it to be blown up, every last building. Hammerschlag's plans list where all the explosives are hidden. Maurice knows of a mystic named Kumasa (Barbara McNair) who has influence over Hammerschlag. She is really Carol Dukes, an American expatriate. Maurice also mentions that the Allies say that Kumasa went to high school with Kinch in the US. Hogan arranges for Klink and Schultz to be sent to Paris and Hogan and Kinchloe will stowaway in the car. In Paris, Carol does recognize Kinchloe. He tells her he needs to get Hammerschlag's plans, but she is unsure she wants to give up everything she has in Paris. They meet with Hammerschlag and hope to trick him into giving up the plans for a short time. Maurice will then takes pictures of the plans and return them. Kinchloe does get Carol to go along. A fake seance helps things proceed as planned.
74	12	"A Russian Is Coming"	Bob Sweeney	Phil Sharp	November 25, 1967	5784-79
Maurice Dubois brings downed Russian pilot Lt. Igor Piotkin (Bob Hastings) to Hogan. His plane had engine trouble and was forced to land. Hogan is a little suspicious of Piotkin and is not sure he can be trusted. Meanwhile, Burkhalter tells Klink that a Russian plane was found not far from camp. Burkhalter puts Klink in charge of finding the pilot. Hogan tells Piotkin his plane has been found and the Allies want to send him to England. Piotkin refuses and wants to go back to Russia. The men hide Piotkin in the tunnel, but he escapes out the tunnel entrance. Dubois brings him back. Piotkin still wants to go to Russia. Hogan comes up with a plan to make Klink think Piotkin is actually a deserter from the German Army. Klink sends Piotkin to the Russian front, not knowing that is exactly where he wants to go.
75	13	"An Evening of Generals"	Bob Sweeney	Laurence Marks	December 2, 1967	5784-80
Burkhalter tells Klink about a top secret meeting of Nazi Generals, Staff Officers and Admirals. Hogan and his men are eavesdropping on the conversation. The meeting will be held in Hammelburg, not far from Stalag 13. Burkhalter wants Klink to hold a banquet the night before. London wants Hogan's team to perform a mass assassination. Though it is probably a suicide mission, the men agree to the job. They bring in Jacques Mornay (Maurice Marsac), a French resistance fighter, who was a chef before the war. Hogan gives him fake Gestapo orders so Klink will have him cook for the banquet. Carter will build bombs with timers to put in the banquet room. The bombs are in place for the banquet when Hogan gets a message from London. Turns out one of the Generals, Felix Mercer (Ben Wright), is actually a British agent. London wants the mission cancelled. Hogan has to figure out how to stop the timers on the bombs or get Mercer out of there. Mercer tells Hogan that there are very important battle plans in the room that must not be destroyed. Hogan finds a way to get everyone out of the banquet room, but also get one copy of the plans, before the bombs went off. Note: Some syndicated prints of this episode do not have the laugh track, though the version released on home video includes it.
76	14	"Everybody Loves a Snowman"	Bob Sweeney	Arthur Julian	December 9, 1967	5784-78
A blizzard gradually buries the area in snow. A downed bomber crew is brought to Stalag 13 by the Underground in hopes of being sent to London soon. Hogan and the men notice a team of Gestapo with picks and shovels heading to Klink's office. Maj. Hochstetter tells Klink that he believes the bomber crew are in the camp and he wants the camp searched. Hogan is eavesdropping on the conversation. Hogan has Captain Morgan (Noam Pitlik) and his men go and hide in the tunnel. Hochstetter inspects Hogan's barracks. To draw attention away from the real tunnel, they let him find the start of a newly dug tunnel. Things get complicated when the men are transferred to a different barracks. Captain Morgan is getting annoyed that his men have not been moved out of camp yet. With the help of a fake snowman, the men are able to dig to one of their tunnels. Morgan and his crew are now able to escape.
77	15	"The Hostage"	Edward H. Feldman	Richard M. Powell	December 16, 1967	5784-81
Hogan and his men learn that a rocket fuel depot is being built near Stalag 13. Marya the White Russian (Nita Talbot) and General Freidrich von Heiner (Theodore Marcuse) are talking to Klink. The Germans are building the depot as a trap because there has been so much sabotage in the area. Marya asks Klink if Hogan is still at the camp. Hogan is suspicious because Marya knows about their operation and he thinks she may have sold them out. The General tells Hogan about the depot and how it may be a trap. He then finds the men's listening device in Klink's office and starts to trace where it leads to. But the men work fast and it leads to a dead end. Hogan talks to Marya and wants to know on whose side is she. She tells Hogan to trust her. Hogan and the men place a bomb under the depot. The General has Hogan's barracks searched. He also tells Hogan that he will be a hostage at the fuel depot. Hogan now knows that Marya gave information to von Heiner. While at the depot, Hogan tells Marya that the bomb will go off soon. She brings in the General and Hogan gives him misleading information about the attack in exchange for being sent back to camp. The bomb goes off killing von Heiner. Marya tells Hogan that was the plan all along. Note: Nita Talbot's work in this episode earned her an Emmy Award nomination for "Outstanding Performance by an Actress in a Supporting Role in a Comedy."
78	16	"Carter Turns Traitor"	Howard Morris	Richard M. Powell	December 23, 1967	5784-62
Hogan learns from London that the Germans are building a chemical weapons factory and they want it destroyed. The men must learn the location of the factory. Carter's acting skills will be put to the test when he must convince the Nazis that he is a chemist and willing to turn traitor. Hogan makes it look as though his men want to kill Carter instead of him going to the other side. This makes Klink believe Carter wants to defect. Klink brings in General Wittkamper (John Myhers) and Leni Richter (Antoinette Bower) to interview Carter. Wittkamper and Klink leave Carter alone with Leni and she proceeds to seduce Carter. She then pours Carter a drink. Leni leaves the room for a moment and Hogan comes through a trap door and tells Carter not to drink what she gave him. It turns out to be poison. Wittkamper tells Hogan that he is taking Carter to the factory so Hogan will not be able to kill him. Hogan and the men dress as Gestapo agents wearing masks and intercept Wittkamper's car. Leni admits to being a traitor and that she has been sabotaging the progress of the factory. Hogan reveals himself to Leni and she admits she tried to kill Carter because she believed he was actually going to help the Germans. Hogan will protect Leni and send her to the Allies with Wittkamper. Note: This is the second of two episodes that were held over from the second season.
79	17	"Two Nazis for the Price of One"	Bruce Bilson	Phil Sharp	December 30, 1967	5784-82
High ranking Gestapo officer Herman Freitag (Alan Oppenheimer) has ordered Maj. Hochstetter to question Hogan. Hochstetter asks Hogan what he knows about the Manhattan Project. Hogan does not give any information because in reality, he has never heard of it. Back in the barracks, Hogan assumes that there is an informant in London because Hochstetter knew some things about Hogan's past. London radios that they've caught the spy. But the spy has already told Freitag everything about Hogan's operation. London orders the team to return home at once and will not tell the men anything about the Manhattan Project. Hogan says he is staying because he wants to find out what else Freitag knows. The men say they will stay as well. Hogan meets with Freitag, who introduces Hogan to beautiful Ilse Praeger. Freitag says he'll remain silent about Hogan's operation if Hogan tells him about the Manhattan Project. Hogan makes a deal to talk later if he and his men are guaranteed safety. Back at the barracks, Hogan plans to eliminate Freitag. But before Hogan can do anything, Freitag's underappreciated assistant, Mannheim (Jon Cedar), kills Freitag first.
80	18	"Is There a Doctor in the House?"	Edward H. Feldman	Arthur Julian	January 6, 1968	5784-75
Hogan brings in Janine Robinet (Brenda Benet) from the French Underground. The men have to keep her hidden for two days before she can be sent to a British submarine. She will be smuggled aboard Klink's car when he goes to a staff meeting and then the Underground will transfer her for the rest of the trip to the sub. Schultz tells Hogan that Klink is sick. LeBeau gives Klink a Bearnaise sauce mustard plaster and the men find a way to give Klink a shot of penicillin. The next day, Klink feels better and greets Doctor Kronk (Anthony Eustrel). Maj. Hochstetter comes by and says no one is to leave camp because a female from the French Underground might be in the area. They are going to bring in some tracking dogs to find her. Hogan and LeBeau convince Klink that he is still a little sick and give him some more Bearnaise sauce mustard plaster. The tracking dogs follow Klink around and Hogan is able to safely get Janine into Klink's car for the trip to the staff meeting. The men later learn that Janine made it to the sub. Note: Some syndicated prints of this episode do not have the laugh track, though the version released on home video includes it.
81	19	"Hogan, Go Home"	Edward H. Feldman	Bill Davenport	January 13, 1968	5784-83
The Allied High Command in London is ordering Hogan back to the states. Much to the surprise of his men, Hogan is initially happy to head home. The men decide to throw him a farewell party. Hogan tells the men he is not leaving, but Kinchloe says a replacement is already on the way. Klink tells Hogan that a prisoner is coming to camp who is senior to Hogan. Klink then tells Hogan that the prisoner is Colonel Crittendon (Bernard Fox). Crittendon arrives and he is as bumbling as ever. Because of a mission the men are planning, it would be too risky for Hogan to escape from Stalag 13. Hogan gets Klink to transfer him to a different Stalag. Hogan finds out he is to be put on the very train that the men had planned to blow up. The men try to intercept the truck Hogan is in, but Crittendon bungles the attempt. The men finally get Hogan and bring him back to camp. Crittendon is transferred to Stalag 15 and the men's sabotage mission is a success. Note: Some syndicated prints of this episode do not have the laugh track, though the version released on home video includes it.
82	20	"Sticky Wicket Newkirk"	John Rich	Richard M. Powell	January 20, 1968	5784-86
Newkirk is on a pass in Hammelburg. He is with beautiful Gretel (Ulla Strömstedt) in her apartment. Two Gestapo agents break in and capture Newkirk and bring him back to Stalag 13. Back at camp, Klink says that as punishment, Newkirk will be permanently transferred to Stalag 6. Captain Anderson (Stewart Moss) is smuggled into camp. Hogan tells Newkirk to take the escape route to England. Maj. Hochstetter is upset the Newkirk was transferred as he was to be questioned and wants him brought back at once. Schultz tells Klink that Newkirk escaped. Newkirk returns to camp with Gretel through the tunnels. Hogan describes an outlandish plan to evacuate Anderson and his men. Gretel tells Schultz she wants to see Klink. Turns out she is a spy and that is why Hogan gave the fake plan. The men now have to blow up the tunnels. Hochstetter and Gretel come to the barracks to look for the tunnel, but find nothing. Carter shows up in a German uniform and claims to be Gen. Von Seidleberg. Carter manages to discredit Hochstetter and Gretel's information. Later, Newkirk tries to explain how he misjudged Gretel. Jay Sheffield as Sergeant.
83	21	"War Takes a Holiday"	Bruce Bilson	Art Baer, Ben Joelson	January 27, 1968	5784-84
Maj. Hochstetter brings several captured Underground leaders to Stalag 13 and wants maximum security until they are sent to Berlin. An Inspector General is due at the camp soon and Hogan hints that Klink might be transferred to Stalingrad unless improvements are made, including the issue of new mattresses and disposal of old ones. Hogan hopes to get into the building where the leaders are being kept under the guise of fixing it up for the inspector. Hochstetter arrives and thwarts an attempt to smuggle the leaders out in old mattresses. Hogan then comes up with an elaborate plan to get Klink and Hochstetter to believe the war is over. Hogan convinces Hochstetter to release the Underground prisoners and even give them his car. After the leaders drive off, Inspector General Busse (Frank Marth) arrives at camp. Busse tells them that the war is not over and Hochstetter is in trouble while Klink works to keep his current prisoners from leaving. Note: Carter (Larry Hovis) does not appear in this episode. Schultz, prior to the war, owned the Schotzi Toy Company, the largest toy manufacturing company in Germany. Klink was a bookkeeper in civilian life before the war. The references to Stalingrad and victorious German forces place this episode in 1942.
84	22	"Duel of Honor"	Edward H. Feldman	Richard M. Powell	February 3, 1968	5784-89
Agent Erika Weidler (Antoinette Bower) comes through the tunnel and she has a list of the men who plan to kill Hitler. Hogan thinks the only way to get the list out safely is if Klink unknowingly takes it himself. Hogan devises an elaborate plan to have Klink believe Erika has fallen in love with him. She tells Klink she could be with him if she were not married to General Weidler. The men have Carter pretend to be the General. Carter comes to Klink's office and challenges him to a saber duel. After Carter leaves, Erika tells Klink she has tickets for them to flee to Argentina. She also slips him the list. Things start to go wrong when Erika tells Hogan that she was questioned by Maj. Hochstetter. Hogan is now afraid the Gestapo will pick up Klink before he can leave. Hochstetter does get to Klink before the plane lands and finds the list. Hogan and his men are disguised in masks and claim to be with Abwehr, the German military-intelligence. The men get the list to the plane and convince Hochstetter to forget he was ever there. Back at camp, Hogan tells Klink that Gen. Weidler went back to the front and Erika went to Berlin.
85	23	"Axis Annie"	John Rich	Laurence Marks	February 10, 1968	5784-85
Agent Blue Fox gives Hogan some maps that he is to deliver to Underground agent Vandermeer in town. Anna Gebhart (Louise Troy), from the German propaganda ministry, arrives in camp. She has a radio show and is known as Axis Annie. Anna wants to interview the prisoners and tell the world how well they are treated in German camps. Maj. Hochstetter and the Gestapo set up a radio detection device at Stalag 13 to look for illegal transmissions. Hogan convinces Klink to give the men time in town in exchange for cooperating with Axis Annie. He also has a plan to destroy the Axis Annie recordings. Hogan, Newkirk and Labeau do the interviews with Anna and are then taken into town. Meanwhile, Carter and Kinchloe blow up the detection device truck and destroy Anna's recordings. In town, Hogan and the men create a fiery distraction and are able to get the maps to Vandermeer.
86	24	"What Time Does the Balloon Go Up?"	Marc Daniels	Arthur Julian	February 17, 1968	5784-87
Christopher Downes, a British spy, arrives at Stalag 13 just as Hogan learns that the Gestapo are around the camp looking for him. He has several secret maps and documents that need to get to London soon. Hogan's first plan to get Downes out of camp in Klink's car falls through. Maj. Hochstetter tells Klink anyone leaving the camp will be shot. The team is not sure what kite flying, basketweaving and tent building have to do with planning an escape, but they're pretty sure Hogan has finally gone crazy. Hogan explains that those projects will all be used to get Downes out of camp in a balloon. Because Hochstetter is getting suspicious, Downes will have to leave that night. The men create a diversion and Downes is sent off with the balloon.
87	25	"LeBeau and the Little Old Lady"	Bruce Bilson	Arthur Julian	February 24, 1968	5784-91
LeBeau complains about having to keep meeting up with an Underground contact who is a little old lady that hates him. He leaves on another mission to see her. In fact his contact, Wilhelmina (Celeste Yarnall), is a beautiful young woman. Back at camp, Hogan receives a message that the Gestapo picked up another agent who gave up information about Wilhelmina. LeBeau gets back to camp and Hogan tells him he will not have to see Wilhelmina anymore as the Gestapo will probably pick her up soon. LeBeau wants to go back to rescue her, but Hogan will not risk him getting caught as well. That night, LeBeau sneaks out of camp. The next morning, Hogan tells Klink that LeBeau escaped in hopes that he will find LeBeau before the Gestapo does. Hogan finds a way to have Klink take him and his men to where LeBeau is. Meanwhile, LeBeau cannot convince Wilhelmina to leave with him because her other contacts need her. Hogan, Newkirk and Carter arrive at Wilhelmina's apartment and see she is not a little old lady. Maj. Hochstetter arrives with the Gestapo. Hogan, his men and Wilhelmina dressed as an old lady come out. Before leaving with Klink, Wilhelmina tells Hochstetter there is someone suspicious inside. Wilhelmina is safely dropped off and makes it to London. The men are told they have a new contact named Juliana. No one else wants to go, so it is up to Hogan. Juliana turns out to also be young and beautiful.
88	26	"How to Escape from Prison Camp Without Really Trying"	Edward H. Feldman	Bill Davenport	March 2, 1968	5784-92
Hogan is on a mission to get information from Audrey St. Laurence (Lyn Peters), whose brother is an SS officer. But Audrey turns out to be from Special Operations in London. Klink informs the men that he will be on leave and Colonel Krueger (Willard Sage) will be in charge. Colonel Nikolas, from the Gestapo, is speaking with Krueger in Klink's office. Hogan and his men are eavesdropping on the conversation. Apparently the Gestapo are going to take over the camp in Klink's absence, which will hinder Hogan's operation. Hogan tries to talk Klink out of going, but it does not work. Kinchloe brings Hogan instructions from London. The team is not sure how London expects five unarmed men to keep 10,000 German soldiers from moving for a few days so the Allies can regroup. Hogan stages a massive escape of prisoners, but they are really hiding in the tunnels. Hogan hopes Nikolas will bring in the German Division to search for the men. Meanwhile, Klink is in a mountain ski lodge. Gen. Burkhalter arrives to bring Klink back to camp because of the escape. Hogan's plan works as the German Division was kept occupied. Plus, he makes Klink look good when all the escaped prisoners are back in their barracks when Klink arrives. Tom Hatten as Sergeant. Jay Sheffield as Corporal.
89	27	"The Collector General"	Bruce Bilson	Laurence Marks	March 9, 1968	5784-90
Underground agent Lisa informs Hogan that a local mine has recently been heavily reinforced. General Metzger (Gavin MacLeod) arrives in camp. The men eavesdrop on Metzger and Klink's conversation. Metzger tells Klink of a secret mission to store ammunition in strategic locations and he is using a local mine. He has brought the first shipment in his truck. Metzger insists that Klink's men guard the mine and the truck. Hogan is suspicious of Metzger's story. The men create a distraction, while LeBeau checks out the contents of the truck. LeBeau finds out that the truck is full of looted French museum pieces. That night, Metzger takes the truck and unloads the contents into the mine. Schultz and another man are left to guard the mine. With the help of Underground agent Karl (John Stephenson), who is dressed as a German officer, the guards are lead somewhere else. Hogan and the team steal back all of the museum pieces. Hogan finds a way to get himself and Klink off the hook with Metzger.
90	28	"The Ultimate Weapon"	Marc Daniels	Richard M. Powell	March 16, 1968	5784-88
The Allies have been losing a lot of planes trying to bomb a certain ball bearing factory. Hogan comes up with an elaborate plan to make it look as though Schultz has the ability to predict Allied bombing raids and attacks on the Eastern front. General Burkhalter wants to know if Schultz can predict which cities will be bombed and when. Schultz tells Burkhalter that Hamburg will be bombed and Hogan finds a way for that to happen. Burkhalter will bring in someone from Berlin to test Schultz. Everyone is surprised when that someone is Colonel Karla Hoffman (Marian McCargo), a female. Hogan again has the Allies bomb Schultz's next prediction, Dusseldorf. Hogan hopes to have Schultz then predict Berlin, which is not far from a ball-bearing factory. The Germans will move all their anti-aircraft defenses toward Berlin and the Allies can bomb the factory. Colonel Hoffman finds it interesting that Hogan is always around when Schultz makes his predictions. She speaks to Hogan alone. He thinks she may be on his side but isn't sure. The next day, Hogan is surprised when she tells him that she is going to the factory. Burkhalter later learns that the factory was bombed. Karla shows up at Hogan's barracks and tells him she never intended to go to the factory. She was testing him and she was never on his side. But her superiors are after her for allowing the factory to be bombed and she asks Hogan to get her out of Germany. He agrees to help her.
91	29	"Monkey Business"	Bob Sweeney	Arthur Julian	March 23, 1968	5784-77
Hogan informs London that Carter is delivering a spare part to the Underground to fix their transmitter. Schultz tells the men that the Hammelburg Zoo was hit in a bombing raid on a nearby ball bearing factory. All the animals were released. Carter comes back and says that there were too many guards around and he could not deliver the part. Carter also brings a chimpanzee to camp. The men name him Freddy and decide to keep him as a mascot. Hogan comes up with a plan to tell Klink that LeBeau was a big game hunter and he could help capture the animals. Then LeBeau might be able to get the part to the Underground. Klink is about to let LeBeau leave when General Burkhalter comes by and puts a stop to the plan. Hogan lets Klink find out about Freddy, hoping he will send Freddy back to the zoo. Freddy will be carrying the spare part with him. Hogan informs London that Freddy will be the courier and the plan works. Laurie Main as Colonel Wembley.
92	30	"Drums Along the Dusseldorf"	Bob Sweeney	Arthur Julian	March 30, 1968	5784-73
Hogan and the men learn from the Underground that a German truck carrying an experimental jet fuel will be their next target. They rig up a bridge with explosives that will be triggered by a large truck crossing it. During mail call, the men find out that Carter is part Sioux and that his Indian name is 'Little Deer Who Goes Swift and Sure Through Forest'. Schultz is thrill to meet a real Indian and Carter starts to make a bow and arrow. Klink tells Hogan that there will be new prisoners coming to camp. The problem is that Hogan finds out they will be crossing the bridge they sabatoged. Hogan tries to have Klink send the prisoners to another camp, but it does not work. Newkirk is sent out to stall the prisoner truck and the other truck crosses the bridge and explodes. The Underground lets the men know that the truck they blew up was carrying Red Cross packages. The jet fuel truck has been rerouted and it will pass by the camp that night. Hogan now has to rely on Carter's archery skills to destroy the truck with a flaming arrow. When the truck passes the camp, Carter shoots the arrow but hits the window trim. Newkirk gets the arrow and he fires it, hitting the truck. The truck soon blows up.

=== Season 4 (1968–69) ===
No. overall	No. in season	Title	Directed by	Written by	Original release date	Prod. code
93	1	"Clearance Sale at the Black Market"	Edward H. Feldman	Laurence Marks	September 28, 1968	5784-96
Schultz is at a local tavern and is flirting with the barmaid, Maria (Doris Singleton). While getting a kiss from her, Maria slips a note into Schultz's coat. Turns out that Maria is a spy and she is using Schultz as her courier. Schultz wants to ask her boss, Hermann, if she could get off early. Schultz stumbles into a meeting between Hermann and Gestapo Major Kiegel (Gavin MacLeod), who are dealing in the black market business. Schultz does not know what they are doing, but apologizes and leaves. Major Kiegel decides to transfer Schultz to the Eastern Front. Back at camp, Schultz tells Hogan and the men how much he likes Maria. Newkirk gets the note out of Schultz's coat. It has important information for the Underground. The next day, Kiegel tells Klink that Schultz is to be transferred and Klink reluctantly agrees. After talking to Schultz, Hogan finds out from the Underground that Major Kiegel is into the black market. Hogan meets with Kiegel and threatens to expose him if he does not leave Schultz alone. After Hogan leaves, Kiegel and Hermann load all their merchandise in a truck and drive off. Kinchloe got pictures of them doing it. The pictures are sent to the Gestapo and Keigel is arrested. Schultz tells Hogan that his transfer has been revoked and he will no longer see Maria.
94	2	"Klink vs. the Gonculator"	Bruce Bilson	Phil Sharp	October 5, 1968	5784-94
Major Lutz (Noam Pitlik), an electrical expert, has been working with Underground agent Lila Fenster (Victoria Carroll). He has a homing device he would like to get out of Germany. But Lila tells him there are too many Gestapo agents watching the men in his department. Later, Lila asks Hogan for his help. Meanwhile, Carter shows the men a rabbit trap he built. Schultz walks in and Hogan calls the trap a Gonculator. Hogan tries to tell Schultz it is really a rabbit trap, but Schultz does not believe him. Schultz wants to tell Klink about the device, but he is too busy. Hogan talks to Klink about trying to get Major Lutz to the camp. Schultz finally is able to tell Klink about the Gonculator. Hogan is eavesdropping on the conversation. Klink and Schultz search the barracks and find the Gonculator. Klink brings in General Burkhalter. The two believe it to be a real device and decide to let Hogan finish building it. Klink and Burkhalter separately call supply officer Captain Dingel for information about the Gonculator. Dingel pretends to know about the device but says it is classified. Major Lutz is brought to the camp and shown the device. After Hogan mentions the name Lila, a diversion is created and Lutz is sent through the tunnels with Lila. Hogan comes up with a reason for Lutz's disappearance.
95	3	"How to Catch a Papa Bear"	Bruce Bilson	Laurence Marks	October 12, 1968	5784-98
Hogan is to meet with some Underground leaders but the men learn that Klink will be doing a surprise late night bed check. Hogan figures he'll be the first one Klink looks for. Because they only know him by code name 'Papa Bear', Hogan will send Newkirk in his place. Newkirk meets with Myra (Fay Spain), Wilhelm (Alan Oppenheimer) and a couple other men in a barn. The Gestapo suddenly show up and arrest everyone, but Wilhelm runs off. Turns out Wilhelm is a Gestapo agent and Myra is working with him. Messages are sent back and forth and Wilhelm hopes to catch 'Papa Bear', while Hogan thinks they'll be meeting with Underground agent 'North Star'. Carter and LeBeau go to rendezvous with 'North Star' who turns out to be Myra. They bring her to camp and she has a plan to free the prisoners, but it is really a trap. Hogan does not like the plan and his men cannot believe he will not save Newkirk. Hogan instead wants to attack a munitions dump not far away. Hogan tells Myra he wants to meet with Wilhelm. Once Myra sends the message, Hogan, who suspected her all along, pulls a gun on her. The men now realize that Myra was going to lead them into a trap. Hogan has a plan to release the prisoners and blow up the dump. Jay Sheffield as Gestapo Officer.
96	4	"Hogan's Trucking Service... We Deliver the Factory to You"	Edward H. Feldman	Bill Davenport	October 19, 1968	5784-93
The men are loading a truck with dynamite in order to blow up a ball bearing plant and then the Underground will hit a railroad depot. They are also pretending to repair Klink's car so they can use it on the mission. Hogan hears from the Underground that the new area Commander has changed the mission. Hogan is still going with the original plan. That night, Klink's dinner plans with Hilda are ruined because his car is not ready yet. Hogan finds out that the new Commander is bumbling Colonel Crittendon (Bernard Fox). Hogan talks Crittendon into delivering the truck to the plant. The men are back at their barracks. A confused Crittendon enters the barracks and says the truck is parked outside. There is still time to get the truck back to the plant before the timer detonates the dynamite. A problem arises when Klink posts a guard by the truck. Crittendon says he can over-power the guard, but that does not go well. Crittendon is brought before Klink and Maj. Hochstetter. Hogan comes up with a plan to get Hochstetter to take the truck to the plant. The men hear the explosion go off right on time.
97	5	"To the Gestapo with Love"	Bruce Bilson	Arthur Julian	October 26, 1968	5784-97
Hogan and his men attempt to blow up two bridges in one evening. The first one is a success. While leaving, Carter unknowingly has a button torn off his uniform and a German guard finds it. Back at camp, they wait to hear the second explosion, but it does not happen. Turns out there was a misunderstanding between Newkirk and Carter as to who was to set the timer. Maj. Hochstetter arrives at camp because he believes the sabotage was performed by one of Klink's prisoners. He has Carter's button that has U.S. on it. Hochstetter is bringing in a new Gestapo interrogation team to question the men. It is psychological warfare when the team turns out to be three beautiful women. Everyone but Hogan is looking forward to talking with the women. LeBeau is the first to meet Inge Wagner (Sabrina Scharf), Heidi Baum (Christiane Schmidtmer) and Anna Mannheim. LeBeau tells the men he gave away nothing to the women. But, when Hogan eavesdrops on Inge's report to Hochstetter, it seems the women got quite a lot from LeBeau. Kinchloe gets a message from the Underground saying the other bridge must be blown up by that night. Hogan wants information from the Underground about the women. Hogan finds a way to get Inge to go to the bridge with him, where he covertly starts the timer. Then with information from the Underground, Hogan plays a little psychological warfare himself and gets the women to turn on each other. And after something is revealed about Hochstetter, the Major sends the women away.
98	6	"Man's Best Friend Is Not His Dog"	Bruce Bilson	Phil Sharp	November 2, 1968	5784-95
Hogan intercepts a note from Gen. Burkhalter to Klink that says all prisoners must be kept in their barracks today until 4 o'clock. Hogan makes sure Klink does not get the note. LeBeau finds a dog and wants to keep it as a pet. Hogan tells Schultz that it is a rare dog and the owner, a German General, has offered a reward for it. Schultz lets them hold onto the dog if he gets part of the reward. The men find out that they were to be kept inside because several new style German tanks are passing the camp. Carter manages to get pictures of them. London says that a contact will arrive to retrieve the pictures. Carter develops the film and then remembers he left the camera by the fence. Hogan figures out that Klink found the camera and now wants to trap the men into revealing it is theirs. Hogan does not let that happen. Burkhalter tells Klink a Swiss Prison commission is coming to inspect the camp. When Klink comes to search the barracks, Hogan hides the film in a dog bone and the dog runs off with it. Hogan figures the contact who'll pick up the film will be with the commission. Now the men have to hunt around for the bone. The commission arrives and soon finish their inspection. It turns out that Hanna, the German guide for the commission, is the contact. Hogan tells her he does not have the film. At the last minute, the dog finds the bone with the film. Hogan gives the dog and the bone to Hanna as a pretend gift. Dick Wilson as Mr. Kraft.
99	7	"Never Play Cards with Strangers"	Marc Daniels	Laurence Marks	November 9, 1968	5784-102
Underground agent Olga (Arlene Martel) shows Hogan and Kinchloe a new rocket fuel plant. The area is heavily guarded. A car pulls into the plant and Olga says it is General von Treger's (Dan Tobin) car. He is in charge of the rocket program. Klink tells Schultz that von Treger will be staying at the camp. Klink wants Hogan to have LeBeau cook a special meal for the General. London wants Hogan to destroy the fuel plant. Meanwhile, von Treger would like Hogan to join him for dinner and cards. Hogan comes up with a plan for Newkirk and Carter to get a truck full of dynamite to the fuel plant. That night while playing cards, von Treger has Captain Moss (Jay Sheffield) change a security measure that will wind up getting Newkirk and Carter caught. Hogan manages to have his men cancel the mission. The next night, Hogan comes up with a plan to get into the plant using von Treger's car and Olga. The General and several others will have to be drugged. This time the plan works and the plant is destroyed.
100	8	"Color the Luftwaffe Red"	Marc Daniels	Laurence Marks	November 16, 1968	5784-99
Newkirk and Carter are looking over the Luftwaffe Intelligence headquarters. Newkirk is dressed as an old lady and Carter is her son. They get a picture of the building, but are then chased off by some guards. Hogan wants to get a bug inside the building. General Burkhalter and Klink are discussing the cost of painting the Luftwaffe headquarters. Hogan and his men are eavesdropping on the conversation. Burkhalter tells Klink it is his job to find the money to get the painting done. To save Klink some money, Hogan volunteers his men for the job. Once inside the building, Kinchloe starts to work on planting the bug. Hogan overhears a call Major Vogel is making about copies of secret maps of fighter deployment locations. Hogan manages to get one of the maps. As Schultz and the men are leaving for the day, Major Vogel insists that they be searched. Hogan tosses the map into a ceiling light fixture. Back at the camp, London says they a sending a courier for the map. The next day, Hogan is able to retrieve the map. Hogan wants to get back to camp as soon as possible, but Schultz insists on buying the men a beer. At the bar, a Gestapo Man (John Crawford) shows up. He tells Schultz that he forgot to search the men. Thanks to Newkirk's sleight of hand, the Gestapo do not find the map.
101	9	"Guess Who Came to Dinner?"	Marc Daniels	Arthur Julian	November 23, 1968	5784-101
Hogan is at a grocery store in town to meet an Underground agent. He meets Heidi Eberhardt (Marj Dusay) and asks her to do another mission. She says she cannot as she believes that the Gestapo is on to her. Heidi asks Hogan to get her out of Germany in the next few days. He says it will be difficult but he'll see what he can do. Her contacts will be "Hans" and "Fritz". Back at camp, the men tell Hogan that London says that Heidi's last contact was picked up by the Gestapo and they think she is a double agent. Hogan feels he has given too much away to Heidi and has to find a way to warn "Hans" and "Fritz". Schultz tells the men that Otto von Krubner (Milton Selzer), a munitions expert, will be coming to camp. Klink agrees to let LeBeau make a dinner for von Krubner and his fiancée. LeBeau is in town with Schultz to buy groceries. LeBeau tells Max (Ned Glass), the owner and a contact, to warn "Hans" and "Fritz". Back at camp, Hogan meets von Krubner and his fiancée, who turns out to be Heidi. When Hogan talks to Heidi, she still insists she can be trusted and gives him some information about von Krubner's new secret factory. Kinchloe checks with London and her information is correct. At dinner, Hogan mentions to von Krubner that his new factory will be bombed. Otto figures that Heidi leaked the location of the factory and calls the Gestapo. What von Krubner does not know is that he is talking to Newkirk. Max shows up as a Gestapo agent. Heidi recognizes Max from the grocery and realizes that Hogan is helping her escape. Hogan and LeBeau figure out a way to blow up von Krubner's car as he is leaving.
102	10	"No Names Please"	Marc Daniels	Laurence Marks	November 30, 1968	5784-103
American journalist Walter Hobson (Richard Erdman)'s plane is shot down and he is rescued by Hogan and his men. They bring Walter, who sprained his ankle, back to the tunnels. He finds out all about Hogan's operation and says it would make a great story. However, he is sworn to secrecy and sent back to the States. Meanwhile, the men have been holding on to a radio for the Underground that they are told cannot be delivered yet. Maj. Hochstetter arrives at the camp. Hochstetter shows Klink and Hogan a newspaper article from the States. Apparently when Walter got home he printed an article that he was rescued by POWs in a German Stalag camp. He does not however mention any names or which camp. The Gestapo will now investigate all the camps. Two new guards arrive at Stalag 13. Hogan tells Klink that he believes that one of the guards, Private Berger (James B. Sikking), is Hochstetter's spy. Hogan gives Klink a plan to get rid of Berger. The men will dig a tunnel for the Gestapo to find. Things get complicated, but Hochstetter and Klink get what they think they wanted and the radio gets to the Underground safely.
103	11	"Bad Day in Berlin"	Richard Kinon	Laurence Marks	December 7, 1968	5784-105
German Major Teppel (Harold J. Stone) arrives at camp and is inspecting Hogan's men. Teppel wants to speak to Hogan alone. Hogan finds out that Teppel is actually Robert Morrison, a deep-cover American spy in German Intelligence. That evening, Hogan arranges some time to speak with Teppel. Teppel needs Hogan's help in capturing a double agent named Decker (John Stephenson). He was working in London and has now come back to Berlin with many Allied secrets. Teppel will take Hogan, some of his men and Klink to Berlin under the guise of further questioning. Teppel and Hogan meet with Decker in his hotel room. Decker is drugged and then Newkirk and Carter, dressed in medical gear, take him to an ambulance. Teppel gets all of Decker's paperwork. But as he and Hogan are leaving the room, Gestapo Major Metzger arrives to see Decker. Metzger is to bring Decker to see Colonel Braun (John Hoyt). Hogan reluctantly pretends to be Decker but is terrified. Once outside, things get complicated but Braun winds up being shot. Teppel and Hogan manage to get into the waiting ambulance and drive off. Teppel thanks Hogan and the men bring Decker back to camp where he'll then be sent to London.
104	12	"Will the Blue Baron Strike Again?"	Marc Daniels	Arthur Julian	December 14, 1968	5784-100
Hogan meets with an Underground agent posing as a Nanny (Celeste Yarnall). She tells him that World War One flying ace General von Richter (Henry Corden), a.k.a. the Blue Baron, has been seen in the area. She also says that there is a rumor that von Richter has moved a secret airfield to this section. Back at camp, London informs the men they want the location of the airfield so they can bomb it. Hogan learns from Klink that Klink and von Richter took pilot trainer together. Hogan talks Klink into throwing a party for von Richter and some other generals. Turns out von Richter does not have fond memories of Klink and will not attend. Hogan gets Hilda to make some calls to inform von Richter and the others that Honey Hornburg and her Exotic Dancers will be the entertainment at the party. General Burkhalter now also wants to attend. It is the night of the party and the generals are having a good time. Hogan only has a couple hours to find out from von Richter where the airfield is. Because von Richter does not want to leave the party, Hogan pretends to be him. Hogan, Carter and Newkirk get into von Richter's car and the driver will take them to the airfield. Things get a little complicated, but the men are able to signal the Allied bombers and the airfield is destroyed. Jon Cedar as Cpl. Langenscheidt. Note: John Banner (Schultz) does not appear in this episode.
105	13	"Will the Real Colonel Klink Please Stand Up Against the Wall?"	Richard Kinon	Bill Davenport	December 21, 1968	5784-107
General Burkhalter describes a rash of sabotages to Maj. Hochstetter and Captain Herber (Noam Pitlik). There is a train delivering plane parts that must get through safely. Because many of the mishaps occur around Stalag 13, Hochstetter believes Klink should be investigated. He will send Herber to be Klink's aide and Herber can keep an eye on Klink. Meanwhile, Hogan gets orders to blow up the train with the plane parts. The men come up with a plan to have Carter dress up as Klink. He will use Klink's car to leave camp with the bomb for the train. Herber arrives in camp. That night, Herber sees who he believes is Klink drive off in the direction of the railroad station and he calls Hochstetter. Hochstetter now suspects that Klink is a traitor and wants Herber to look for more evidence. They will also notify the train station to have the train take another route. Hogan and his men are eavesdropping on this conversation. Hogan must concoct an alibi for Klink before the firing squad is assembled. Klink, Schultz, and Hogan are questioned by Burkhalter and Hochstetter. Hogan finds a way for suspicion to be cast on Herber and the train is later blown up.
106	14	"Man in a Box"	Richard Kinon	Laurence Marks	December 28, 1968	5784-106
There is a research center that is located near the camp. London wants diagrams, notes and pictures of the place. LeBeau is to meet with Underground agent Luise and get into the center as a French collaborator. But while all this is going on, Klink finds out that LeBeau has escaped. None of Klinks men can find LeBeau. Hogan volunteers to go into town and bring LeBeau back and Klink finally agrees to let Hogan try. At the research center, LeBeau gets the pictures he needs. Hogan meets in town with Luise and she gives him the camera. Hogan tells her to make sure LeBeau gets back to camp by that evening. Schultz, in civilian clothes, has been covertly following Hogan, but Hogan knows it. Luise keeps Schultz occupied while Hogan gets away. Klink then shows up in civilian clothes and tells Schultz to find Hogan. After viewing the pictures, Hogan comes up with a plan to get LeBeau back into the center. LeBeau is to open a safe, get the information he needs and set the center on fire. Klink sends Hogan out again to look for LeBeau. LeBeau completes his mission and Hogan finds a way to have Klink recapture LeBeau. John Crawford as Gestapo Major.
107	15	"The Missing Klink"	Marc Daniels	Bill Davenport	January 4, 1969	5784-104
Underground agent Hans Wagner has been captured and is due to be executed soon. Hogan learns that Klink is to pick up General Burkhalter from the train station. If the Underground can kidnap Burkhalter, they could trade him for Hans. When Burkhalter is not on the train, Klink heads back to camp. Karl Wagner (Chris Robinson) and his men mistake Klink for Burkhalter and kidnap him. They give Schultz a message to give to the Gestapo. Back at camp, Schultz gives the note requesting a trade to Captain Gruber (Dick Wilson). Karl and Ilse (Ann Prentiss) learn that they have Klink and not Burkhalter. And they receive word from Burkhalter that Hans will still be executed. Hogan tries to convince Burkhalter and Maj. Hochstetter to save Klink with no luck. Hogan then comes up with a plan to make Hochstetter believe that Klink is actually a British undercover agent named Nimrod that the Germans desperately want captured. The trade between Hans and Klink is made and Klink is returned to camp. Hogan then finds a way for Hochstetter to find out he has been fooled and Klink is not Nimrod. Hogan is then surprised to find that the real Nimrod has left him some important plans to smuggle out of camp.
108	16	"Who Stole My Copy of Mein Kampf?"	Bruce Bilson	Phil Sharp	January 11, 1969	5784-109
It is the middle of the night and Kinchloe brings a message from London to Hogan. He starts to read it to his men when Klink and Schultz show up. Hogan hides the message in a book. Klink wants to know what the men are doing up at this time of night. After a brief discussion, Klink leaves and takes the book with him. The men have to get the book back to find out what the urgent message was. The next day, General Burkhalter comes by with Colonel Sitzer (Alan Oppenheimer), who is with the Ministry of Propaganda. For the propaganda value, Klink is to receive an award in a week for his no escape record at camp. The ceremony will be broadcast over the radio. Meanwhile, the men manage to get the book back. The urgent message was that they are to silence Leslie Smythe-Beddoes (Ruta Lee), an Allied defector who join the Propaganda Ministry. Thinking Leslie is a man, Hogan plans to give Leslie an electric razor that will explode when operated. Hogan then finds out Leslie is a woman and has second thoughts about following London's orders. Leslie arrives at camp to talk to Klink about the radio broadcast. Instead of having to kill Leslie, Hogan finds a way to have her embarrassed and discredited over the radio. She is then sent to the Gestapo. Note: Some syndicated prints of this episode do not have the laugh track, though the version released on home video includes it.
109	17	"Operation Hannibal"	Bruce Bilson	Laurence Marks	January 18, 1969	5784-110
General von Behler (John Hoyt) tells a German Captain (Jack Riley) about a plan he has developed that will guarantee victory. Meanwhile, Hogan and his men are helping to build a railroad. A woman comes by with food for the men. When Schultz says she cannot do that, she identifies herself as Hedy von Behler (Louise Troy), the General's daughter. Schultz arrests LeBeau when he takes a cheese sandwich. While Klink has LeBeau on trial, Hogan takes the paper that was wrapped around the sandwich. The note says that Hedy has vital information that must be delivered soon. Hogan knows that Hedy has been giving London information for more than a year, but nothing that could harm her father. Hogan dresses as a German Officer and meets with Hedy. He is then introduced to General von Behler. Later, Hedy tells Hogan about her father's plan called "Operation Hannibal". The German army will begin guerrilla attacks against the Allied armies which could extend the war for years. Hedy would like to see the war be over and Hitler gone. The paperwork for the entire operation is in her father is safe and she will help Hogan get the plans to the Allies. But Hogan cannot take the plans, only photograph them. Hedy says she will do anything to protect her father and if Hogan or his men are caught, they will be shot. Things get a little complicated, but Hogan and his men are successful in their mission. Note: Ivan Dixon does not appear in this episode.
110	18	"My Favorite Prisoner"	Bruce Bilson	Laurence Marks	January 25, 1969	5784-112
Klink is hosting a party and he introduces the lovely Baroness von Krimm (Marj Dusay) to Hogan. Schultz tells Hogan that he can arrange for him to see the Baroness outside of camp the next night. This is part of Klink's plan to have the Baroness charm information out of Hogan. Hogan meets with the Baroness and she asks him about plans to escape the camp. Klink and Schultz are listening in. But Hogan reveals nothing because he sees the microphone in the lamp. Back at camp, London sends a message saying a man will arrive at the camp with special orders. Captain Sears (John Orchard) arrives with plans for an Allied invasion. The plans are fake but the Allies want the Germans to think they are secret plans and prepare for the invasion that is not coming. Major Hochstetter wants Klink to stop using the Baroness as she is a Gestapo agent and he does not want anything to happen to her. But he will let Hogan see her one more time. Hogan and Sears, with the help of the Baroness, find a way for Hochstetter to get the plans. But Sears is arrested in the process. Newkirk, Carter and LeBeau manage to get Sears out of Gestapo headquarters. James B. Sikking as Gestapo Officer.
111	19	"Watch the Trains Go By"	Bruce Bilson	Laurence Marks	February 1, 1969	5784-111
Hogan and his men are placing explosives by a railroad track. Some Germans wind up in the area and the men have to leave before setting the detonators. When the men get back to camp, they notice an increased guard presence. London sends word that they are not happy that the train was not blown up. Hogan learns that General Burkhalter will be making an inspection tour of the camp. Knowing that she still is fond of Klink, Hogan finds a way for Burkhalter to bring his sister, Gertrude Linkmeyer (Alice Ghostley). Burkhalter arranges for Gertrude and Klink to be alone and she mentions marriage. Klink asks Hogans help in getting rid of her. Hogan tells him to just tell her the truth. Schultz drives Klink and Gertrude out of camp and Klink hopes to just tell Gertrude the truth. Hogan has stowed away in the trunk and is able to set the detonators. Gertrude is mad at Klink and the train is blown up. Hogan finds a way to have Klink save face with Burkhalter.
112	20	"Klink's Old Flame"	Bruce Bilson	Arthur Julian	February 8, 1969	5784-108
It is urgent that Hogan get some radios to the Underground in France. LeBeau and Carter will make the trip. The plans are put on hold when Klink doubles the guards and roll calls. Hogan learns from Klink that the camp will have a visit from Count Rudolf von Heffernick (Ben Wright), a Gestapo General. Hogan then has LeBeau pretend to try an escape. Hogan suggests that as punishment, Klink send LeBeau to Stalag 4, which is not far from Paris. Rudolf von Heffernick tells Klink it would be a mistake to send a Frenchman into a Stalag in France. Klink now will send LeBeau to Stalag 14, which ruins Hogan's plan. Meanwhile, von Heffernick is engaged to Marlene Schneider (Norma Eberhardt), who happened to be an old girlfriend of Klink's. Rudolf wants to make sure she does not still have feelings for Klink. If all goes well, they will be married and honeymoon in Paris. And Klink will be promoted to General. Hogan and his men are eavesdropping on the conversation. Hogan agrees to help Klink if LeBeau stays in camp. Marlene arrives to find a disheveled and apparently drunk Klink. She finds him disgusting and never wants to see Klink again. Kinchloe hides the radios in von Heffernick's car. Marlene and Rudolf marry and the radios are on their way to Paris. Something happens to cause General Burkhalter to tear up Klink's promotion.
113	21	"Up in Klink's Room"	Bruce Bilson	Harvey Bullock, R.S. Allen	February 15, 1969	5784-113
London informs the men that a British agent that is posing as a German officer has been wounded and is being sent to a local hospital. The agents name is Major Zimmer (Forrest Compton) and he has a lot of top secret information. Hogan finds a way to have Klink sent to the hospital with a fake injury. Hogan and Schultz go to visit Klink and Hogan finds out when Zimmer will be arriving. Klink is told that his tests are negative and he may leave. Hogan speaks to Dr. Klaus (Henry Corden) in hopes of keeping Klink in the hospital. Klink is still leaving, so Hogan feigns an illness and Dr. Klaus admits him into the hospital. Major Zimmer arrives and Hogan is able to make contact with him and gets the secret information. Hogan then finds a way for Klink to bring him back to camp. Muriel Landers as Second Nurse.
114	22	"The Purchasing Plan"	Marc Daniels	Laurence Marks	February 22, 1969	5784-116
London drops a load of ammunition near Stalag 13 and Hogan and his gang are expected to store it at the camp to eventually be distributed to various Underground groups throughout Germany. Meanwhile, General Burkhalter is angry with Klink because his operating budget for the camp is 30% higher than any other Stalag. Burkhalter insists that Klink bring his costs down. The men manage to get the ammo into their tunnels but do not know how they will get it to 4 different locations. Carter comes up with a cost cutting plan where Stalag 13 will be the distribution center for all the Stalags. Hogan then figures that they can get the Germans to move the ammo for them. Klink hears about Carter's plan and takes it to Burkhalter and Maj. Hochstetter calling it the "Klink Plan". Hochstetter does not like the idea, but Burkhalter wants to try it. Hogan tricks Klink into letting Carter help with the distribution process. The men then find a way to get the ammo mixed in with the Germans boxes. The Underground will then intercept the trucks carrying the boxes and retrieve the ammunition. Hogan learns the plan was successful. Something Klink does causes a small problem that Hogan and Carter have to rectify.
115	23	"The Witness"	Marc Daniels	Richard M. Powell	March 1, 1969	5784-117
General von Rauscher (Gavin MacLeod) and his girlfriend Marya (Nita Talbot) are in Klink's office asking about Hogan. Hogan and the men are eavesdropping on the conversation. Schultz brings Hogan to Klink's office and Hogan believes it is because of his past experience with Marya. The General tells Hogan that the war is over as the Germans have developed a rocket that can destroy any target. Hogan is to witness a test flight of the rocket and then be sent to America to tell the Allies any further fighting is futile. Hogan asks why he was chosen and von Rauscher says that Marya has dropped some hints that Hogan knows something about the Underground. Hogan is brought to the launch site and is told a British ship will be the first target. Hogan tells Illyich Igor Zagoskin (Larry D. Mann), a Russian scientist working on the rocket, that Russia will eventually be a target. Maj. Hochstetter arrives looking for spies. He says the Gestapo will be in charge now. When they're alone, Marya tells Hogan she is still on his side and is only there to bring Zagoskin back to Russia. Zagoskin tells Marya and Hogan that the rocket will take off but then return to the launch site killing everyone including himself. Hogan and his men create a diversion and rewire the rocket to explode upon launch. Hogan then tricks Hochstetter into sending Zagoskin back to Russia.
116	24	"The Big Dish"	Edward H. Feldman	Ben Gershman	March 8, 1969	5784-114
Hogan is flown to London where he attends a meeting with Professor Burrows, Air Marshal Woodhouse (Laurie Main), and General Boland (George Cisar). He is told that the German Ack-Ack is blasting Allied fighters from the sky. And the Luftwaffe are experimenting with a new super sensitive mobile radar. It was developed by Lady Valerie Stanford (Karen Steele), an expert electronics scientist. She is a British citizen who has gone over to the German side. The men believe the radar is in the vicinity of Stalag 13. They would like to have the radar destroyed and hopefully Lady Valerie returned to London. Back at camp, the mobile radar arrives as do Maj. Hochstetter and Luftwaffe General Reicker (Paul Lambert). Hogan and the men eavesdrop on the conversation in Klink's office. Hochstetter is against testing the radar here at camp, but it is Reicker's decision. Hogan learns that Lady Valerie is at a local hotel and he goes to see her. She tells him she was forced to work with the Germans because they held friends of hers hostage. She says the radar test will not go as the Germans planned. Later, Hogan learns that she lied to him. Hogan and his men find a way to sabotage the radar and discredit Lady Valerie. David Wiley as Radar Operator.
117	25	"The Return of Major Bonacelli"	Jerry London	Arthur Julian	March 15, 1969	5784-118
London wants to know if the men have been able to get any pictures or information about Germany's newest anti-aircraft guns, some of which are positioned at a nearby town. Kinchloe says they have not because of very tight security. Major Bonacelli (Vito Scotti), Commandant of an Italian POW camp, arrives at Stalag 13 through the tunnels. He is fleeing the Gestapo who have discovered him to be a spy. Because Klink does not know that Bonacelli is a traitor, Hogan hopes Bonacelli can talk Klink into letting him see the guns. Hogan will then get him to London. Klink is happy to see Bonacelli, who once studied running a POW camp under Klink. Klink agrees to show him the guns and then take him to lunch. While inspecting the guns, Bonacelli accidentally drops his camera and Klink finds it. Bonacelli comes up with a plausible explanation and then gets pictures of the guns. Meanwhile, Maj. Hochstetter shows up at camp. Hogan hears that Hochstetter is looking for Bonacelli. Klink brings Bonacelli to a restaurant for lunch. Hogan, Newkirk and LeBeau show up soon after and are in the kitchen. They manage to get Bonacelli to the kitchen, but then have to hide him when Hochstetter arrives. After some maneuvering, the men get into Klink's car and leave. The men later hear from Bonacelli in London and he says thanks for getting him to safety and the pictures came out great. Marion Brash as Gretchen.
118	26	"Happy Birthday, Dear Hogan"	Marc Daniels	Arthur Julian	March 22, 1969	5784-115
Hogan goes to the movie theater in town and meets with Underground contact Mama Bear (Barbara Babcock). She tells him the Germans are suspicious of Stalag 13 because of the local sabotages. They plan to set a trap with false secret information. If the information is used, the Germans will know that it is someone in camp. Hogan must not do anything until further notice. Meanwhile, Maj. Hochstetter tells Klink about a situation that makes a local ammunition depot vulnerable to a bomb attack. Hochstetter knows that Lebeau is just outside of the open window. Hochstetter gives Klink a note stating that the information he just gave was false and is a trap. Newkirk is making plans for Hogan's birthday party. Lebeau tells the men what he heard, and Newkirk decides bombing the depot would be Hogan's surprise birthday present. Kinchloe radios London with the plan. Hogan returns and tells the men that all activities must stop for a while because of the trap. The men did not say anything to Hogan and Kinchloe goes to tell London to cancel the mission. Hogan tells the men to not send any messages as a radio detection truck pulled into camp. Lebeau meets in the theater with Mama Bear hoping the Underground can send a message to London. She says that the Underground had to dismantle their radio. The men tell Hogan that they fell into the trap. Hogan comes up with a plan. During the birthday party, they find a way to get the men out of the radio detection truck and then send a message to London.

=== Season 5 (1969–70) ===
No. overall	No. in season	Title	Directed by	Written by	Original release date	Prod. code
119	1	"Hogan Goes Hollywood"	Edward H. Feldman	S : Tony Thomas; T : Richard M. Powell	September 26, 1969	5784-121
The POWs watch the latest war film recovered from an aircraft that had just been shot down. The men are not impressed with Hollywood's vision of the war. Klink says that he wants to make a film about how great Stalag 13 is. Klink is now going to introduce a new prisoner who was in the plane that was shot down. Major Byron Buckles (Alan Oppenheimer), who was the star of the movie and is now a soldier, comes in. The egotistical Byron has agreed to be in Klink's film. The men are not happy about Byron turning traitor and being in a propaganda film. Hogan gets word from London about a bridge that needs to be blown up. Hogan decides to let Byron do the film provided Hogan directs it. Hogan tells Klink that Schultz will play the part of the Commandant and Klink will play Schultz. Hogan starts filming and General Burkhalter shows up wanting to know what is going on. Hogan talks Burkhalter into being in the film and also help produce it. Burkhalter is talked into filming a scene at the bridge. Hogan says that they will only pretend to blow it up. The bridge really does gets blown up and Hogan filmed Burkhalter, Klink and Schultz pushing the detonator. Burkhalter agrees to come up with a story of how the bridge was blown up. Buckles will be leaving the camp in a prisoner swap. Victoria Carroll as Actress Playing Nurse.
120	2	"The Well"	Bruce Bilson	Laurence Marks	October 3, 1969	5784-122
Hogan learns that General Burkhalter and Captain Ritter, a Luftwaffe intelligence officer, are coming to the camp. Carter and Lebeau are cleaning Klink's outer office. Lebeau covertly observes Ritter asking Klink to store a top secret Luftwaffe code book in Klink's safe. Lebeau tells Hogan what he saw and that the book is in a water-proof package. Hogan wants to steal the book, copy it and then return it. Hogan finds a way to get Klink out of the office and Newkirk opens the safe and gets the book. As Newkirk is leaving the office, Schultz tells him that there will be an immediate prisoner roll call. Not wanting to be caught with the book, Newkirk tosses it into a dry well. The men blow up the waterworks at Hamelburg, causing the camp to now have no water. Hogan talks Klink into letting his men try to reactivate the dry well. They get the well working and retrieve the book. When Schultz wants to do a spot check, Lebeau is forced to throw the book back into the well. The men create a diversion and Carter is lowered into the ice water of the well. As they are pulling Carter up, a guard comes by and they have to drop Carter into the well again. They finally get Carter up with the book. The books information is sent to London and Newkirk returns the book to Klink's safe.
121	3	"The Klink Commandos"	Edward H. Feldman	Richard M. Powell	October 10, 1969	5784-126
Marya (Nita Talbot), the White-Russian spy, and senior Gestapo officer Count von Waffenschmidt (Frank Marth) arrive in camp. Marya fawns all over Klink as if she were in love with him. Hogan and his men eavesdrop on Klink's office. The Count is a courier on the way to the Russian front with some secret battle plans in an attache case handcuffed to his wrist. That night, Hogan and Newkirk try to get the attache case but the Count wakes up and catches them. It turns out that the Count knows that Marya is a Russian spy and he is trying to catch her other informants. He will have Hogan and Newkirk put into the lock-up until he returns from the front. They will then be turned over to the Gestapo. Hogan comes up with a plan to still get the secret plans. Carter, dressed up like a German General, tells Klink he needs some prisoners for a suicide mission to the Russian front. Carter will pick the men and Klink will be their leader. Hogan and his men, dressed as German soldiers, join Klink on a train to the front. The Count and Marya are also on the train. Hogan tells Marya that the Count knows she is a spy and is after her contacts. She says that she knows that and she already has the plans in the attache case. Marya allowed Hogan to be caught because she needs his help in a larger plan to discredit the Count. The Count has been drugged and they make it look as though they've seen the plans. Hogan and Marya talk the Count into defecting and they head back to Stalag 13.
122	4	"The Gasoline War"	Richard Kinon	Laurence Marks	October 17, 1969	5784-125
Hogan and his men watch as the Germans set up a gasoline refueling depot at Stalag 13. It will be used to refuel convoys heading to France. They can store the fuel there because they know the Allies will not bomb a POW camp. The Underground wants one of Hogan's men to meet with a contact in town who will be code named Eskimo. Hogan meets up with Eskimo, whose real name is Lousia (Marianna Hill). The Underground would like Hogan to destroy the gas pumps. The next day, Klink turns down a request to remove the gas drums from barracks 12. He also will not move the prisoners out of the barracks to prevent any sabotage. Hogan decides to destroy the convoy instead of the gas pumps. Newkirk, dressed as an old woman, meets in town with Eskimo to get more detonators. The convoy arrives and getting the explosives on the trucks is complicated and dangerous. Captain Streicker (Eric Morris), who is commanding the convoy, confronts Newkirk, who is dressed as a German guard. Newkirk manages to convince Streicker that he was stationed there by Klink. Hogan's plan works and the convoy is destroyed. The next day, Klink tells Hogan that Berlin has ordered him to dismantle the gas pumps. Bruce Kirby as Franz. Note: Convoys destined for France are to supply the combat fronts there, setting this episode in 1944 after D-Day.
123	5	"Unfair Exchange"	Richard Kinon	Laurence Marks	October 24, 1969	5784-124
Young Underground contact, Maria Hoffman, is reciting a memorized update of German military movements to Hogan and Kinchloe. Carter comes in saying the Gestapo are near. Maria says she will stall the Gestapo while Hogan gets away. Back at camp, Hogan learns from the Underground that Maria is in a jail in Hammelburg. Hogan says they have to rescue her because she is a valued asset plus she still has more information wanted by Allies. Burkhalter and his sister Gertrude Linkmeyer (Kathleen Freeman) arrive at camp. Hogan decides to kidnap Gertrude and trade her for Maria. Meanwhile, Burkhalter tells Klink to seriously consider marrying Gretrude. Klink thinks this marriage idea is all Burkhalter's. He asks Hogan to talk to Gertrude and find out if it is her idea. Instead, Hogan tells Gertrude how much Klink is interested in her. Gertrude thinks she is going to meet Klink in town. On the way there, she is abducted by Hogan and his men. Once it is discovered that Gertrude is missing, Maj. Hochstetter gets involved. The men are keeping a blindfolded Gertrude in the tunnels, but tell her she is in a hotel. Klink gets a phone call and is told when Maria is freed, Gertrude will be freed. Hochstetter is opposed but Burkhalter insists the trade be made. Hogan learns that Maria has been freed. With Schultz's unknowing help, Hogan finds a way for Gertrude to be found without falling into Hochstetter's trap.
124	6	"The Kommandant Dies at Dawn"	Richard Kinon	Arthur Julian	October 31, 1969	5784-127
A vegetable vendor comes by camp and gives Hogan a message about production numbers for the Luftwaffe. Hogan wants LeBeau to get the information to the Underground. Klink tells Hogan that Field Marshal Kesselring (Ned Wertimer) will be arriving the next day. Gestapo Major Feldkamp (Ben Wright) arrives and confines the prisoners to their barracks. Schultz asks Hogan and his men to help with the cocktail party for Kesselring. Then Klink will host a dinner party in town. The men cannot go with to town so Hogan hopes to use Klink as the courier to the Underground. Kesselring and Fraulein Ziegler arrive to the party. Newkirk has planted the message on Klink's coat. Trying to show off, Klink spills Luftwaffe secrets to Fraulein Ziegler. She tells Major Feldkamp what Klink said and Klink is arrested for treason. He is taken to the guard house with his coat. Hogan tries to get the message off of Klink's coat. Schultz tells Klink he is to be shot. Hogan enlists Schultz to get Klink out of the guard house. Hogan then finds a way to have Kesselring drop the charges on Klink and get the message to the Underground.
125	7	"Bombsight"	Richard Kinon	R.S. Allen, Harvey Bullock	November 7, 1969	5784-128
The men learn that the Germans are storing large crates of something labeled "chicken hawk" in camp. General Burkhalter arrives and he brings with him the blueprints for the chicken hawks. He wants to put them into Klink's safe, which now has a new lock and combination. Hogan and his men eavesdrop on Burkhalter and Klink's conversation. The chicken hawks are a new type of bomb that can pin point radio signals and direct the bomb toward the target. Burkhalter claims these bombs will win the war for the Germans and they will be tested here at camp. The General is about to explain how the bombs work when the men lose the microphones signal. Hogan tricks Klink into opening his safe and Newkirk sees the combination through the office window. Newkirk is caught by Klink trying to open the safe. Hogan tricks Klink into letting him punish Newkirk. Hogan and the men do find a way to get pictures of the blueprints. But, because of something Klink does, the negatives get ruined. Before the bomb test, the men manage to place radios in various places around the camp. The bombs destroy these locations and miss the target. Burkhalter cancels further development of the bomb. Note: Some syndicated prints of this episode do not have the laugh track, though the version released on home video includes it.
126	8	"The Big Picture"	Bruce Bilson	Laurence Marks	November 14, 1969	5784-120
Gestapo Captain Bohrmann (Sandy Kenyon) comes to see Klink. Bohrmann is investigating the assassination attempt on Hitler. He shows Klink a photo of Klink with a prime conspirator in the attempt. Klink and the man have a long history between them. Hogan and his men are eavesdropping on the conversation. Bohrmann says that if he turns the picture over to the Gestapo, Klink may be executed. Bohrmann wants money for his silence. Klink's dipping into the camp's finances, to make payments, begins to affect the prisoners and staff. Hogan decides that they need to get the picture away from Bohrmann. He and Newkirk rent a hotel room next to Bohrmann's and manage to find out where the picture is being kept. The next night, Hogan, Newkirk and LeBeau return to the hotel. Newkirk and LeBeau create a distraction and Hogan gets the picture and its negative. They are then anonymously returned to Klink.
127	9	"The Big Gamble"	Marc Daniels	Laurence Marks	November 21, 1969	5784-129
A large formation of Allied bombers fly over the camp. One of the aircraft is hit and the crew parachute out. The plane crashes near the camp but did not burn up. Captain John Mitchell (Noam Pitlik), from the plane, is brought into camp. Mitchell is sent to solitary. LeBeau distracts Schultz with food and Hogan is able to talk to Mitchell. Mitchell tells Hogan there is a top secret Direction Finder box aboard the plane. Because it failed to self-destruct, someone has to retrieve it before the Germans find it. Hogan lays out a plan for getting the box, but his men are not thrilled about the prospect of getting caught. The plan fails when Gestapo Major Feldkamp shows up. Feldkamp tells Klink that Berlin is sending Dr. Wolfgang Becker, a specialist in electronics, to look over the wreckage. Hogan and his men are, as usual, eavesdropping on the conversation. The men find out that Becker's one weakness is gambling. Hogan tricks Klink into setting up a casino in camp as a way to raise money for a Winter relief fund. Becker does find the DF box in the plane. Hogan hopes to swap the real box for a fake one that Carter built. The casino is running, but Becker is leaving that evening. Hogan talks Becker into gambling a little. The men create a distraction and are able to switch boxes.
128	10	"The Defector"	Jerry London	Laurence Marks	November 28, 1969	5784-131
Hogan meets with Underground agent Gretchen (Arlene Martel) on a dark road near Stalag 13. She tells him that Field Marshal Rudolph Richter (Harold J. Stone), a close friend of Hitler, wants to defect to London. Gretchen says that London approved the plan and they want Hogan's help. Hogan says that Richter is too well known and it would be too dangerous. Hogan tells his men that Richter arrives next Thursday and they'll have to figure something out. Richter and Gretchen, as his secretary, arrive in camp days early. Richter tells Klink that he is there to make an informal inspection. Ritcher arranges to have dinner with Hogan, Gretchen and Klink. Everyone is surprised when Maj. Hochstetter shows up. Richter is able to tell Hogan that he arrived early because the Gestapo is following him. Hochstetter tells Klink that Richter is suspected of treason. Hogan quickly hides Richter, while Hochstetter says he will search the entire camp. The men then make it look as though Richter was blown up in his car. Richter is safely gotten out of camp.
129	11	"The Empty Parachute"	Marc Daniels	Phil Sharp	December 5, 1969	5784-132
Hogan is in Klink's office when Maj. Hochstetter and a Julius Schlager (Parley Baer) suddenly arrive. Hogan notices that Julius has a briefcase chained to his wrist. Back at the barracks, Hogan and his men eavesdrop on the conversation. Julius tells Klink that the results of a highly important mission are in the case and must be safely delivered to Berlin. Hitler is sending plane to pick Julius up. The men have Schultz find an empty parachute in camp. Hochstetter believes someone has landed to steal the briefcase. They search the camp, but no one is found. Hochstetter puts the case in Klink's safe and posts a guard to watch it. A distraction is created in Klink's office and Newkirk is able to get the case out of the safe. After inspecting the case, Hogan believes the locks are booby trapped. Hogan contacts Major Blair (Ronald Long), a demolition expert, in London. It takes some doing, but with Blair's instructions, Hogan is able to open the case. Inside they find an engraving plate and counterfeit US currency. The men tamper with the plate and after creating another distraction, are able to get the case back into the safe.
130	12	"The Antique"	Bruce Bilson	Arthur Julian	December 12, 1969	5784-123
Lebeau brings pretty Underground contact Kristina into the tunnels to meet the men. She tells them that the Underground's courier system is disabled. Hogan has extremely important information that needs to get to various locations in western Europe. They'll have to figure something out. Meanwhile, Klink tells Hogan that because two Commandants had been shot, General Burkhalter has increased the guards at all the camps. Hogan sees a cuckoo clock in Klink's office and tells him it is an antique. Hogan buys the clock from Klink for $100. Klink then buys 50 more clocks and intends to go into the antique business. Hogan suggests that Klink send some of the clocks to various dealers in the towns that Hogan just happens to need to send his information to. Gen. Burkhalter arrives because another Commandant has been shot and he is keeping an eye on Klink. Kinchloe radios Janine Robinet (Brenda Benet) from the Underground. He tries to explain that the important information will be in the cuckoo clocks. The men create a diversion and put Kristina in the trunk of Burkhalter's car. Hogan later learns that Kristina made it to safety and the clocks were delivered.
131	13	"Is There a Traitor in the House?"	Marc Daniels	Arthur Julian	December 19, 1969	5784-133
The men are about to pass to London much needed details regarding a new ball bearing plant located near the camp. But then some aerial bombing close to the Stalag knocks out radio transmissions. Later, Klink has the POWs listen to a radio broadcast by Berlin Betty (Antoinette Bower). She is seeking volunteers to be interviewed on a future program. The man would have to renounce the Allies' war efforts and in return will be treated to an intimate evening with Betty. Hogan learns that Betty also broadcasts to London and he comes up with a plan. Newkirk tells Klink that he will speak to Betty. The men pretend to be angry with Newkirk for being a traitor. Klink informs them that Betty will be coming to the camp to make the broadcast. Berlin Betty arrives in camp and meets with Newkirk. And they have an instant attraction to each other. She tells him the only reason she does the broadcasts is because her family is being held hostage. Newkirk comes back to the barracks, tells the men what Betty told him and he is not going through with the broadcast. He is worried that if the Germans figure out his coded message, Betty and her family will be in trouble. Newkirk reluctantly goes through with the broadcast. He finds out from Betty that she has no family and that when she kissed him it was just a test. Newkirk is now glad he did the broadcast. The next day the plant is bombed. Victoria Carroll as English Girl.
132	14	"At Last—Schultz Knows Something"	Bruce Bilson	Laurence Marks	December 26, 1969	5784-134
General Burkhalter, Dr. Hermann Felzer (John Myhers) and Klink are having a meeting in Klink's office. Felzer is working on Project 49. Felzer has something top secret to discuss with Klink and refuses to do it in the office. Hogan and the men are eavesdropping on the conversation. Klink has been chosen for the highest security project in the Third Reich. They will discuss the details in Burkhalter's car. LeBeau gets into the trunk of the car. He hears about a new atomic research facility, but its location is never mentioned. Klink is to be in charge of security. Hogan needs to find out the location. Kinchloe gets the odometer reading from Burkhalter's car and they know the building is in a 12 mile radius. The men bring in Underground agent Carla (Fay Spain). She says there are no new buildings in that area. As Schultz knows the location of the facility, Carla suggests drugging him. London supplies the men with truth serum and Newkirk dresses up as a German doctor. Schultz is drugged, but all he talks about is the kitchen and potatoes. Carla says there is a town that grows potatoes within the 12 mile zone. With Carla's help they find the location of the underground facility. The men plant explosives inside of some potatoes, dress up a peasants and go to the location. The guards there demand the potatoes and bring them in the building. It is not long before the facility is blown up. Jack Riley as Guard.
133	15	"How's the Weather?"	Marc Daniels	R.S. Allen, Harvey Bullock	January 2, 1970	5784-130
London informs the men that they plan to bomb the hydro-electric dam nearby the camp. They need daily weather reports, especially wind speed and direction. London needs this information so that the planes can navigate the mountain around the dam. At first, they use a volleyball filled with helium. Hogan then finds a way for Newkirk to get balloons out of the Officer's Club. After Klink finds the men with the balloons, Hogan comes up with a story about throwing an anniversary party for when he took command. The next day, LeBeau releases some of the balloons after Schultz "surprises" him. London needs more weather information for the bombing the following day. Hogan and Newkirk trick Klink into calling the meteorological center for the next days forecast. General Burkhalter, who is at the dam checking on security, calls Klink to warn him that unauthorized radio transmissions have been detected in the local area. Fearing possible sabotage, Burkhalter demands that Klink be extra diligent in observing prisoner activity for anything unusual. Hogan finds a way to have Schultz release another set of balloons. Klink is now suspicious of the party Hogan has planned for him. It is the night of the party and Klink tells Hogan he checked on the anniversary date and it is not for months. And Klink notices that Kinchloe is not at the party, so he moves the party to the barracks. Kinchloe was sending a Morse code message but had to stop when Klink showed up. Hogan finds a way for Klink to unknowingly help in the bombing of the dam.
134	16	"Get Fit or Go Fight"	Jerry London	Bill Davenport	January 9, 1970	5784-138
Klink has been on an outing in town. He is at his car giving a goodbye kiss to pretty waitress Gerda (Corinne Conley). While doing this, she has a young boy conceal a note and film in the hubcap of Klink's spare tire. Back at camp, the men retrieve the packet and process the film containing images of several military installations. The note says that the next delivery will contain the information on new J4 rocket bases. But it also says that the note must be picked up before Friday, as this underground group will break up. Meanwhile, General Burkhalter complains to Klink about the number of escapes from camps lately. Burkhalter says the Commandants have become lazy, so they will all have to pass a physical. Those who fail will be sent to the Russian front. Klink's exam will be in one week. Klink tells Hogan about the physical and he'll be constantly working out. That means no more trips into town for a week. The men trick Klink into thinking he is in great shape. Feeling good about himself, Klink decides to go into town. Something Carter does makes Klink feel old and he cancels his trip into town. The men try to help Klink work out. It is the last day to pick up the undergrounds information, but Klink's physical is the next day and he wants to work out. Hogan has Carter dress up as the German doctor and he examines Klink. Maj. Kimmel, the real doctor, shows up a day early wanting to see Klink. Hogan pretends to be Klink and has Kimmel examine him. Thinking he passed the physical, Klink goes into town and the men are able to get the information they wanted.
135	17	"Fat Hermann, Go Home"	Edward H. Feldman	Richard M. Powell	January 16, 1970	5784-136
Hogan is in the compound briefing his men on a trainload of precious stolen artwork that may be headed in their direction. A very proud Schultz lets it slip that he has been selected to escort Reichsmarschall Hermann Göring from town to the Stalag. Schultz goes to the hotel room expecting to meet Göring, but instead finds Marya, the White Russian spy. Marya tells Schultz that whenever Göring makes a public appearance, he is likes to have a double do it for him. Marya and Schultz arrive at camp and go directly to their quarters. Hogan wonders what connection there is between Göring showing up and the train coming soon. Hogan, Carter and LeBeau go to kidnap Göring. The men are surprised when they find Schultz and not Göring. Marya has a plan using Schultz to get the artwork. Marya tells Klink that Göring wants the artwork to be stored at camp. The crated artwork is brought to Hogan's barracks and London is told when to pick it up. Maj. Hochstetter arrives and wants to know why the artwork was sent to the camp. Klink tries to tell him that Göring ordered it. Hogan is eavesdropping on the conversation. Hogan convinces Schultz to continue to pretend to be Göring. Hochstetter is asking a lot of questions when Hogan's men create a diversion and make it look as though the artwork was stolen. The artwork is smuggled out of camp and is on its way to London. Hogan convinces Hochstetter to not pursue the matter any further. Timeline: The transfer of looted art from Carinhall sets this episode in 1945. Göring sent as many art works as he could to a "safer" location before having Carinhall destroyed on April 28.
136	18	"The Softer They Fall"	Richard Kinon	Laurence Marks	January 23, 1970	5784-137
Klink asks Hogan and Kinchloe what they think of Stalag guard "Battling" Bruno's (Chuck Hicks) boxing capabilities. Kinchloe is not impressed. Bruno has reached the finals of the Luftwaffe Boxing tournament. Klink wants Kinchloe to help train Bruno and be his sparing partner. Hogan overhears that General Burkhalter is coming to camp with Captain Stahl and Major Rudel (John Stephenson) for a secret meeting. Carter spy's on the meeting and learns that Stahl and Rudel have a plan to knock out the British radar. They need a place to work in secret for a week to commit the plan to paper. Hogan needs to find a way to get the guards away from the building that Stahl and Rudel are working in. Burkhalter watches as Kinchloe and Bruno spare and Kinchloe knocks out Bruno. Burkhalter tells Klink that word is spreading that a prisoner was able to knock out a guard. To prove German superiority, there needs to be another fight and Bruno must be guaranteed to win. Klink gives Bruno metal weights to put in his gloves. Hogan tells Kinchloe that the fight has to go at least 6 rounds to give LeBeau enough time to photograph the plans. It is the evening of the fight and Stahl and Rudel are ring side to watch. During round one, Kinchloe is knocked down and realizes Bruno has something in his gloves. The guards by Stahl and Rudel's building are distracted by listening to the fight over the loudspeakers. LeBeau gets the photos of the plans. Despite Kinchloe knocking out Bruno, Hogan throws in the towel and lets Bruno win. Jon Cedar as Second Corporal.
137	19	"Gowns by Yvette"	Bruce Bilson	Arthur Julian	January 30, 1970	5784-135
Hogan receives word that the Underground is sending a contact to Hammelburg. The contact will arrive Saturday with information about a mobile rocket launching factory. He will be at the Hauserhof for a wedding and will only pass the info to "Papa Bear" (Hogan). Klink tells Hogan that he is being trapped into marrying Burkhalter's sister and it is to be at the Hauserhof. Hogan now sees a way to meet the contact. Burkhalter arrives and tells Klink that it is his niece Frieda (Muriel Landers) who is marrying Count von Hertzel (Dick Wilson). Klink was only to make the arrangements. Hogan tells Burkhalter that LeBeau can design the wedding dress and Newkirk can sew it. The General consents. Hogan, LeBeau and Newkirk are allowed to go into town to meet with Frieda. Hogan slips away to meet the contact and is arrested by the Gestapo. Schultz is able to be Hogan's alibi and the Gestapo Man (Bruce Kirby) has to release Hogan. But, the Gestapo still have the contact. At the Hauserhof, the wedding is over and LeBeau creates a distraction. The men are able to get the contact away from the Gestapo. The men dress the contact in a copy of the wedding dress, get the info from him and get him out of the building.
138	20	"One Army at a Time"	Edward H. Feldman	Laurence Marks	February 13, 1970	5784-139
Hogan, Carter, LeBeau and Newkirk, dressed in German uniforms, take explosives to blow up a local bridge. Once there, they are surprised by a German patrol and they all scatter trying to return to camp. The patrol finds Carter with the explosives. Back at camp, the men are worried about Carter. At a German base, the Captain (Dave Willock) questions Carter. Carter is regarded as a hero for preventing an attempted sabotage and is promoted to Acting Corporal. Maj. Hochstetter arrives at camp and tells Klink about the failed attempt on the bridge. Despite the late hour, Hochstetter wants a roll call to see if anyone is missing. Carter does manage to get back to camp while the roll call is going on. He tells the men that the Germans have the explosives and the detonator and how afraid he was. Carter reluctantly agrees to go back to retrieve the explosives. Carter comes back and tells Hogan he could not find the dynamite. The next night, Carter returns for another night time roll call. He tells Hogan he found the location of the explosives. Hogan finds a way to get rid of Hochstetter and the nightly roll calls. That night, Carter meets the men with the explosives and a tank. They plant the dynamite on the bridge. Then using the tank from a distance, they set off the explosives and blow up the bridge.
139	21	"Standing Room Only"	Jerry London	Laurence Marks	February 20, 1970	5784-141
Klink has been seeing beautiful Sofia Lindemann (Victoria Carroll) for a month and gives her a jade necklace. Meanwhile, seven POWs who escaped from Stalag 5 have been hiding for two weeks in the tunnels of Stalag 13. They are growing antsy and one of them tries escaping from there. He is caught by Schultz, but Hogan manages to free him. Hogan is upset because this could've exposed his whole operation. Because of tightening of security in and around all the Stalags, moving the escapees to freedom has been put on hold. General Burkhalter arrives in camp with Major Strauss (Noam Pitlik), the Commandant of Stalag 5. Strauss will be assigned to Stalag 13 for training in the proper operation of a POW camp. Strauss is not happy about it. Hogan learns that the Underground are sending 8 shot down fliers to be stored in the tunnels. Strauss, with Schultz's unknowing help, discovers serious discrepancies in Klink's financial records. Klink has been spending a lot of camp funds on Sofia. Strauss tells Klink he will inform Burkhalter. Hogan comes up with an elaborate plan to free the 15 men in the tunnels and to get rid of Strauss. Forrest Compton as Captain. Eddie Firestone as POW Miller.
140	22	"Six Lessons from Madame LaGrange"	Jerry London	Arthur Julian	February 27, 1970	5784-143
Hogan is in town to meet with Underground agent Lily Frankel (Marlyn Mason). She is working as a singer performing at a popular night club. Lily tells Hogan that a traitor is going to pass information to Major Hochstetter, listing the names of the entire Underground organization and Hogan's men. Hogan tells the men what he learns and they decide on a mass escape. Hogan gets Klink and Hochstetter to go see Lily that evening. The men will then escape and blow up the tunnels. The plan is put on hold when Hochstetter assigns Gestapo guards everywhere in camp. The next morning, Klink tells Hogan how he spent the night dancing with Lily. Klink says that Hochstetter was jealous because he does not know how to dance. That night, Hogan meets with Lily again. She says the Double Agent will meet Hochstetter at the club the next night. Hogan comes up with another plan. Lily will ask Hochstetter to go dancing and Hogan will meet the Double Agent pretending to be Hochstetter. Hogan gets Hochstetter to take dancing lessons from LeBeau. Hogan then finds a way to get General Burkhalter to remove all the Gestapo guards from camp and put Hochstetter under house arrest for dancing with a prisoner. Hogan meets with the Double Agent and gets the information from him.
141	23	"The Sergeant's Analyst"	Bruce Bilson	Bill Davenport	March 6, 1970	5784-140
Being the supply sergeant, Schultz comes to the barracks with a stash of canned foods that he stole from the supply depot. He also brings Hogan a loaf of pumpernickel bread. The bread has hidden photos in it. The photos are part of a collage that give the details of the German Western Wall. The details of the wall will make it possible for the RAF to destroy it. The final set of photos will be delivered this coming Friday. Schultz takes a nap on a cot in the barracks. General Burkhalter pulls a surprise inspection and catches Schultz asleep, on duty, and in the prisoner's barracks. Burkhalter is furious and orders Schultz to be sent to the Russian front. The men have to figure out how to keep Schultz in camp because he is the only one who can get the pumpernickel from the contact at the supply depot. Klink is about to have the transfer order torn up until he learns that they came from Burkhalter. Schultz is confined to his quarters. An attempt to obtain the pumpernickel using Klink as the supply sergeant fails. Hogan convinces Klink to call in psychiatrist Dr. von Schram (Newkirk as a lady doctor) and "hypnotize" Schultz into being a better soldier. Schultz does "act" more professional and Burkhalter cancels his transfer. Hogan is now able to have Schultz get the last set of photos in the pumpernickel.
142	24	"The Merry Widow"	Edward H. Feldman	Harvey Bullock, R.S. Allen	March 13, 1970	5784-142
Hogan has a photo negative detailing the construction of a new and complex landmine that is hampering Allied advances. Getting the photos to London has been delayed by a collapse in the primary tunnel. Hogan arranges for Underground agent Countess Marlene (Marj Dusay), aka the Merry Widow, to be in town. After convincing Klink that Marlene is interested in him, Klink goes to town to see her. What he does not know is that LeBeau has placed the negative in his jacket and Marlene finds a way to get it. Back at camp, Hogan is introduced to Sgt. Meadowns. He led the team that obtained the original photos, but it turns out that they are for a prototype of the landmine. If the Allies use the negative as a guide to disarm the mines, they will be blown up. Meadowns brought a replica of the current mine that must be sent to London. Hogan calls Marlene with the news that the negative is worthless and she should get rid of Klink. The plan is now to have Schultz go to see Marlene with a gift of flowers that have the mine hidden in them. Things get complicated when Klink comes back to Marlene's room while Schultz is there. Klink sees the flowerpot and realizing it is from his office, he takes it away with him. There is not much time before Marlene is to catch a plane. Hogan has Marlene come to camp. It takes some doing as Marlene has to deal with both Klink and Schultz. But she gets the flowerpot with the mine and leaves before the two know what happened. William Henry as Florist.
143	25	"Crittendon's Commandos"	Edward H. Feldman	Bill Davenport	March 20, 1970	5784-144
Hogan receives word that he is to pick up six commandos being parachuted into the local area and bring them back to camp. The commandos are there to capture Field Marshal Rommel, who is currently recuperating in a hospital near Hammelburg. The men, wearing German uniforms, arrive at the appointed site with a truck. They run into the commandos who happen to be led by Col. Crittendon (Bernard Fox). Crittendon refuses to have his men ride in the truck and says that he and his men will walk the ten miles to the Stalag. He believes it will be safer that way. Back at camp, Hogan and his men wait. Eventually Crittendon arrives by himself saying the rest of his men were captured. Crittendon is upset because his mission is now ruined. He was to exchange Rommel for captured British Admiral Todly, who is head of naval intelligence. Hogan volunteers his men to complete the mission. At the hospital, Crittendon screws up and sets off an alarm. Before he further jeopardizes the mission, Hogan gives Crittendon a sedative. The men get Rommel and Crittendon out of the hospital. Later, the men learn that they did not get Rommel but instead got Admiral Todly, who was at the same hospital.
144	26	"Klink's Escape"	Bruce Bilson	Harvey Bullock, R.S. Allen	March 27, 1970	5784-119
The men bring in 4 escapees from Stalag 12 and give them all they'll need to be sent to London. Meanwhile, Klink is having a romantic evening with Heidi Friederich. General Burkhalter bursts in bringing news of a prisoner escape from Stalag 12. There have been far too many escapes and Burkhalter wants Klink to increase his guards. He also wants a surprise inspection now. Burkhalter believes that the escapes are far too organized. He thinks there must be a processing center to manage such a large number of escapees. Hogan is concerned about the large number of Allied bombers being shot down in their attempts to destroy a nearby tunnel. Hogan would like to destroy the tunnel but the increased guards will make that hard to do. Hogan knows that Klink and Burkhalter would like to find the processing center. Hogan makes up a story for Sgt. Schultz, where a POW camp commandant arranged for prisoners to escape and be followed to their contacts. Schultz tells Klink the idea and Klink immediately takes credit for it. The next day, Klink provides the men with several opportunities to escape. Klink is happy when he overhears the men say they plan to escape that night. Klink makes it easy for the men to have German uniforms and a vehicle. He placed a radio transmitter in the trunk of the car, but Newkirk removes it. Hogan gets Klink to be his hostage so they can get through Burkhalter's roadblocks. Newkirk puts the radio transmitter in Burkhalter's car. Burkhalter leaves the camp with Heidi. Schultz, not knowing it is him, follows at a distance. Meanwhile, with Klink blindfolded, Hogan and his men are able to set the explosives at the tunnel. Schultz and some guards break in on Burkhalter and Heidi. Hogan brings Klink back to the camp saying they changed their minds about escaping. Not long after, the tunnel blows up. Tom Hatten as Lieutenant. Note: Last appearance of Sgt. Kinchloe (Ivan Dixon).

=== Season 6 (1970–71) ===
Note: Changes for the 1970-71 season included the occasional use of a new more varied and dramatic musical underscore; a re-recorded closing theme; and increasingly dramatic story lines (including the filming of the series’ only dramatized killing). The incorporation of occasional unique and varied camera angles is also noted. In addition, Carter’s character becomes increasingly silly to the point of ineptness, which intensifies Newkirk’s and LeBeau’s disdain. Meanwhile, Washington, added as Kinchloe’s replacement without explanation, never develops as a strong, distinguishable character.

No. overall	No. in season	Title	Directed by	Written by	Original release date	Prod. code
145	1	"Cuisine à la Stalag 13"	Jerry London	Laurence Marks	September 20, 1970	37784-146
Klink is entertaining General Wexler (John Hoyt) and Captain Richter (Jay Sheffield). General Wexler is on the promotion board. Klink has LeBeau prepare a special meal for them. It turns out that Richter is an Allied sympathizer, and he has documents of interest to pass on. While the dinner is going on, Newkirk gets the documents from his briefcase and the men take pictures of them. Most of the documents have low-grade information. But one has a message that at the next dinner, Richter will be bringing plans for German West Wall underwater obstacles. Hogan, Newkirk and LeBeau meet with Underground agent Marie Bizet (Brenda Benet), give her what they have and tell her more is to come. Marie tells LeBeau that Gen. de Gaulle has issued a call for all free Frenchmen to rally in England in preparation to liberate France. LeBeau says he will go to England. The men try to talk him out of it but get nowhere. So as to not ruin the next dinner party and their chances at more information, LeBeau tries to teach the other men to cook. LeBeau is about to leave and the men say their goodbyes. He is to stay with Marie until he can be brought to England. Klink discovers LeBeau is missing and starts a search for him. While Hogan tells LeBeau that Klink is looking for him, agent Karl comes in and tells them that the Gestapo have picked up Marie. Hogan says the men will help free Marie if LeBeau stays and cooks the meal for Wexler and Richter. LeBeau can leave for England after that. The men find a way to free Marie, LeBeau cooks the meal and they get the vital information from Richter. LeBeau tells the men that he has decided to stay. Note: First appearance of Sgt. Baker (Kenneth Washington) replacing Sgt. Kinchloe (Ivan Dixon) in a similar role. The story line did not explain what happened to Sgt. Kinchloe nor how Sgt. Baker came to be part of Hogan's core espionage group.
146	2	"The Experts"	Marc Daniels	Laurence Marks	September 27, 1970	37784-145
It is late at night and Hogan is having some alone time with Hilda in Klink's car. He witnesses the Gestapo pull into camp. Major Stern awakens Klink and tells him that he is there to arrest two recent staff additions, Captain Metzler (Noam Pitlik) and Sgt Holtz. Hogan and his men are eavesdropping on the conversation. Klink tells Stern that Holtz is on guard duty and the Metzler is on leave and will be back in three days. Hogan looks through the sink periscope and witnesses the Gestapo gunning down Holtz in the compound. The next day, Lebeau and Carter procure the personnel files of the two men and Baker takes pictures of them. It turns out that both men are radio communications specialists and were both assigned to the same headquarters in Berlin. The men learn from the Underground that Metzler is at his girlfriends apartment in Hammelburg. Hogan goes to see Metzler and Maria (Barbara Babcock), but Metzler is reluctant to reveal any information. Newkirk and Underground agent Luisa (Sabrina Scharf) come by to say the Gestapo are going through town looking for Metzler. Metzler still does not completely trust Hogan and wants proof that Hogan has connections in London. In exchange, Hogan also wants a little information. Metzler tells him that he was part of a group installing the most important communications center in the world. He can describe it and tell how it can be sabotaged. A few days later, Hogan gets Metzler the proof he wants. Hogan finds a way to get the Gestapo out of Stalag 13 and he brings Metzler and Maria back to camp. At camp, Metzler gives Hogan the rest of the information he needs. The men prepare Metzler and Maria for their trip to London. Note: This episode dramatizes the series' only killing.
147	3	"Klink's Masterpiece"	Richard Kinon	Phil Sharp	October 4, 1970	37784-147
Hogan is picnicking with Underground contact Rhona (Victoria Carroll), who is also a curator at a local art gallery. He tells her that the Germans will be transporting critical supplies using three different routes. Each of the convoys will have to be destroyed. Hogan will soon have maps showing which roads will be used and will get that information to her as soon as it is available. Rhona thinks the Gestapo may be watching her so she gives Hogan a homing pigeon to send her details of their next meeting. Back at camp, Carter brings in the maps but they have been cut up into small pieces. The men have almost finished reassembling the maps when a German plane drops a bomb near camp. This causes parts of their tunnel system to cave in. Hogan sends Rhona a message via the pigeon saying that the three leaders of the attack groups should meet him at the art gallery this Sunday. Hogan comes up with a plan to make Klink believe he has artistic talent. The men supply Klink with some canvases and paints. Hogan convinces Klink to take three of his paintings to the art gallery. Hogan hides the maps behind the canvases and goes with Klink to the gallery. Rhona says she has three collectors that would be very interested in the paintings. Jon Cedar as Cpl. Langenscheidt.
148	4	"Lady Chitterly's Lover: Part 1"	Edward H. Feldman	Richard M. Powell	October 11, 1970	37784-151
Early in the evening the men witness a small plane crashing near the camp. They also see a person parachuting out of the plane. The men use their tunnels to get out of camp. Just as they are apprehending the person, Sgt. Schultz arrives. The men overhear that the man is British and a traitor. Later, Klink is talking with the man who turns out to be Sir Charles Chitterly. Charles wants Klink to notify Hitler of his arrival. The men are eavesdropping on the conversation. Klink calls General von Schlomm (Harold Gould), who will arrive soon to escort Charles to Berlin. LeBeau mentions that except for the glasses and a goatee, Charles looks a lot like Colonel Crittendon (Bernard Fox). Hogan arranges to have Crittendon brought from Stalag 12. Carter dresses in a German uniform and pretends to be von Schlomm. Carter, with Hogan's help, kidnaps Chitterly. Schultz tells a confused Klink that von Schlomm is just arriving in camp. The real von Schlomm tells Klink that he'll be taking Charles to Berlin as soon as Charles' wife arrives. Hogan hopes that Crittendon can find out from Lady Leslie Chitterly (Anne Rogers) what Charles' mission is. Lady Chitterly gives Crittendon a hug. She is about to put a knife in his back when Hogan stops her. Turns out Leslie wanted to kill Charles because he is a traitor. Hogan learns from her that Charles is in Germany to get Hilter's terms for England's surrender. Leslie agrees to work with Hogan.
149	5	"Lady Chitterly's Lover: Part 2"	Edward H. Feldman	Richard M. Powell	October 18, 1970	37784-152
General von Schlomm gets through to Hilter in Berlin and tells him that he, Sir and Lady Chitterly will leave immediately. The men are listening in on the conversation. Hogan tells Leslie that von Schlomm will be taking them away soon. Hogan and Leslie are not sure they can trust each other. In Klink's office, Hogan and Crittendon try to stall von Schlomm. Leslie suddenly calls Hogan "darling" and gives him a long kiss. She says she has fond memories of that "mad, marvelous, romantic" summer shared by the three of them. Leslie tells a stunned von Schlomm to inform Hilter that it will be 3 or 4 days before they will leave. Hogan is not sure her plan will work as Hitler and the Gestapo will want to know what is going on. Newkirk tells Hogan that Sir Charles got away. Charles tries to tell Klink that he was being held by the prisoners in some tunnels. Klink tells Maj. Hochstetter the story that Charles gave him. Meanwhile, Charles is recaptured. Hochstetter questions Crittendon who denies that he claimed to be kidnapped. Leslie and Hogan show up and Hochstetter is very upset. Hitler calls and Leslie talks to him and says they will not be coming to Berlin as von Schlomm has the terms for England's surrender. She then talks Hitler into sending a large contingent of ships to England as a threat. Later, Hogan arranges for Crittendon and Leslie to be sent to England. Baker tells Hogan that the German ships are in the English Channel and Allied planes will bomb them very soon. After learning that the German ships were sunk, Hochstetter arrests von Schlomm and Charles for treason.
150	6	"The Gestapo Takeover"	Irving J. Moore	Laurence Marks	October 25, 1970	37784-150
Major Strauss (Joseph Ruskin), from the Gestapo, is in Klink's office. Strauss calls in Hogan and says that the Gestapo will be taking over Stalag 13. The German officers, including Klink and Schultz, will remain for a couple weeks and then all will be transferred to the Russian front. Strauss says that General Mueller (Martin Kosleck) gave the orders. Hogan is worried that this could end their operation. Strauss and his men find one of the tunnels. When Hogan will not give any information, he is sent to solitary for a week. Hogan wants to get a recording of Mueller's voice and have Newkirk try to imitate it. Hogan is released and meets with Klink, who agrees to work with Hogan to get rid of the Gestapo. Hogan arranges to have Klink bring him into town. At the bar, Hogan has two women keep Klink and Schultz occupied. Hogan slips away and meets with Underground agent Otto Baum (Bruce Kirby). Otto comes to camp pretending to be a Swiss envoy. Otto tells Strauss he is to meet Mueller here at the camp. Strauss calls Mueller, but is actually speaking with Newkirk. Newkirk tells Strauss that he is sending Captain Geissler (Forrest Compton), who is actually an Underground agent, in his place. The men eavesdrop on the conversation between Strauss, Otto and Geissler. Thinking it is what General Mueller wants, Strauss signs a paper agreeing to be paid to be part of an assassination plot against Hitler. Klink gives General Burkhalter the paper and Burkhalter blackmails Mueller into having the Gestapo return control of Stalag 13 to Klink.
151	7	"Kommandant Schultz"	Marc Daniels	Laurence Marks	November 1, 1970	37784-149
An Underground agent named Hercules (Eric Morris) is smuggled into camp. He brings with him a large brick containing uranium and the knowledge of 22 locations where the Germans are storing large quantities of the same type of bricks. London would like to analyze the brick. Hogan is about to prepare for Hercules to be airlifted to London, but then Baker tells him the flight will be delayed for two days due to foul weather. Meanwhile, General Burkhalter tells Klink that Hitler has ordered that all Stalags begin command training to senior non-commissioned officers. This means Schultz will take command and Klink will be his advisor. Schultz then doubles the guard outside of camp. Hogan will not be able to use the tunnels and Hercules is stuck in camp. Hogan thinks they can use Oscar Schnitzer and his dog truck to move Hercules. That plan is ruined when Schultz stops the truck before Hercules can get in it. Hogan now plans to discredit Schultz. He makes Klink believe that he might be sent to the front and Schultz be made permanent commandant. Klink agrees to help Hogan. Klink will pull the guards from outside of camp. They will then stage a crisis to make Schultz look bad. That night, Hogan is now able to get Hercules out of camp and on his way to London. The next morning Schultz is told that Newkirk and LeBeau are missing. Burkhalter relieves Schultz of his command and Klink is back in charge. Hogan arranges for Klink to find Newkirk and LeBeau.
152	8	"Eight O'Clock and All Is Well"	Richard Kinon	Laurence Marks	November 8, 1970	37784-155
Hogan and his men blow up a large convoy of supply trucks. The next day Maj. Hochstetter is in Klink's office. He mentions that recent sabotage operations all occurred suspiciously close to Stalag 13. Hogan and his men are eavesdropping on the conversation. The men had planned on destroying an ammunition train that was passing by next week, but Hogan thinks they need to lie low. Klink introduces a new POW named Captain James Martin (Monte Markham) to Hogan and the men. Martin knows the correct code word to repeat to fellow prisoners if captured and seems to be a legitimate American flier. The men continue to test Martin and Baker says that London has checked him out. Hogan shows Martin their tunnels and tells him about their operation. Underground agent Karl (Dick Wilson) discusses the ammunition train with the men and Hogan decides they will sabotage it. During roll call Martin shoves Schultz and is brought to Klink's office. Hogan grows suspicious. Because of prisoners in the outer office, Martin writes Klink a note. Klink tells Hochstetter that the note says Martin is really Captain Seifert of the Gestapo on a special assignment. Clues lead Hogan to believe Martin is either a German spy or an Allied traitor. Despite his insistence that he is really Martin, the men tie him up and intend to send him to London. They then set the explosives for the train. Schultz tells Klink and Hochstetter that Martin is missing. Hochstetter gets a call that the train was blown up. The men find a way to make it look as though Martin was near the train when it blew up and was killed.
153	9	"The Big Record"	Richard Kinon	R.S. Allen, Harvey Bullock	November 15, 1970	37784-154
Some of the prisoners are relaxing in the recreation hall. Klink comes in with a recording machine that the men can use to send a message to loved ones. Suddenly some SS men show up and Klink orders everyone back to their barracks. The men learn from Schultz that General Burkhalter ordered the hall emptied for Colonel Schneider (John Myhers). Hogan and Newkirk trick Klink into telling them that the hall will be used for a top secret, high-level strategy briefing. The SS guards prevent the men from running a microphone wire to the hall. The men convince Schultz he has a great singing voice and that Newkirk's uncle is a talent scout. They trick Schultz into letting them put the recording device in the hall where recording him will sound better. Klink comes by and after hearing the reason they are there, Klink suggests recording his string quartet (second movement of KV 499). Klink wants the men to bring the recording device to his office right away. Hogan and Baker find a substitute for the recorder and leave the original in the hall. Burkhalter introduces Schneider who will brief the officers on a support plan for an upcoming offensive. The whole meeting is being recorded and is later sent to the Allies. Later, Burkhalter and Schneider learn that the Allies prevented the offensive from being a success. Jack Riley as S.S. Man.
154	10	"It's Dynamite"	Bob Sweeney	Laurence Marks	November 22, 1970	37784-153
Maj. Hochstetter tells Klink that he'll be storing dynamite in the camps "cooler". He will also use one of the cells as his office. Hochstetter will not tell Klink what the dynamite will be used for. Hogan and the men are eavesdropping on the conversation. Schultz is to drive some of the stored dynamite to a secret location to be used. Hogan plans to intercept the truck, take the dynamite and store it out of camp for future use. Somehow, Schultz is not on the road where Hogan thought he should be and there is no intercept. There is another truckload leaving that night and Hogan would like to find out where it is going. Again the men lose track of where the truck went. Hogan asks Underground agent Berger to have some of his men search the area. Later, Hogan gets a message that Berger has located some of the dynamite. The explosives are hidden in bunkers in the ground. Hogan figures that the Gestapo plans to use it to destroy bridges and other resources as the Nazis prepare to retreat from advancing Allied Forces. Hogan believes that Hochstetter has a list of the places that will be blown up. Carter pretends to be the Fire Chief of Hammelburg and Underground agent Elsa (Lyn Peters) is his secretary. The two go to see Hochstetter and the Major is quite taken with Elsa's beauty. While Elsa keeps Hochstetter occupied, Carter plants several smoke bombs in the office. The distraction allows Hogan to get the paperwork that he needs. Note: Newlyweds Bob Crane (Colonel Hogan) and Sigrid Valdis (Hilda) have two scenes where they are kissing in the office and are interrupted by Newkirk (Richard Dawson). They were married October 16th and this episode aired November 22, 1970.
155	11	"Operation Tiger"	Jerry London	Laurence Marks	November 29, 1970	37784-158
Hogan learns that Marie Louise Monet, code-named Tiger (Arlene Martel), a primary Underground leader, has been captured by the Gestapo. His request to London to attempt a rescue is outright denied. Hogan reminds his men that Tiger saved his and many other lives. At first the men are against disobeying London's orders, but when Hogan says he'll go it alone, they join him. The men create a diversion and Underground agent Karl is brought into camp. Karl tells them that Tiger will be brought to Berlin, questioned and then executed. She will be transported the next evening in a munitions trains that will pass nearby. The men manage to stop the train. Carter, dressed as a German officer, tells Gestapo agent Captain Steiger (Frank Marth) that the track up ahead is mined. Carter says that until the mines can be removed, the safest place to stay is Stalag 13. Now that Tiger is in camp, Hogan comes up with an elaborate plan to get her away from the Gestapo. Hogan and Newkirk, as Gestapo agents, will join Tiger and Steiger on the train. Hogan and Newkirk subdue the other Gestapo agents and get Tiger off the train. The train will blow up making the Gestapo Headquarters think Tiger was killed. Tiger is then sent to London.
156	12	"The Big Broadcast"	Jerry London	Bill Davenport	December 6, 1970	37784-160
Baker gets an extremely high priority message that he decides to end abruptly. He believes that a radio detection unit picked up their signal. But Baker thinks that he ended the transmission before their location could be discovered. The part of the message the men did get says that they are to make contact with Underground agent Hercules (James B. Sikking). He has vital information that Command wants immediately. Hogan tricks Klink into letting the men "repair" his car. Maj. Hochstetter comes in and tells Klink that a radio transmission was picked up in the area and he needs to find it. Even if the men get the information from Hercules, they now cannot transmit it from camp. The men put a two way radio into Klink's car. To get past Hochstetter's guards, the men dress up as Gestapo agents and go to meet up with Hercules. Hercules gives them details of the location of a new rocket manufacturing plant. They then radio the information to Command from the car. Jay Sheffield as SS Man. John Crawford as Second Officer. Willard Sage as First Officer. Buck Young as Guard.
157	13	"The Gypsy"	Richard Kinon	Harvey Bullock, R.S. Allen	December 13, 1970	37784-148
Hogan learns that Klink is into astrology and frequents a seer. A large half-track vehicle is parked in the compound and is covered up. Schultz is guarding the vehicle. The men convince Schultz that he should have photos taken of himself with the exposed vehicle so as to impress a local barmaid. Hogan actually takes pictures of the many dials and controls on the vehicle. That night it is raining and it starts to leak over LeBeau's bed. Baker tells Hogan that London has seen the pictures. The vehicle has a magnetic deviator on it that will throw off the aiming of a radar. London wants Hogan to actually send the device to them. While fixing the leak up on the roof, LeBeau is almost hit by lightning. Hogan decides he is going to tell Klink that LeBeau was hit by lightning. This causes LeBeau to acquire psychic abilities gained from his gypsy heritage. The men find a way to get Klink to believe their story. LeBeau then tricks Klink into leaving the half-track unguarded. Baker and Carter are able to get the deviator and place explosives in the vehicle. LeBeau pretends to have lost his psychic abilities due to the blast.
158	14	"The Dropouts"	Marc Daniels	Laurence Marks	December 27, 1970	37784-157
Some of the men are busy placing explosives on a bridge. Hogan and Carter, dressed in German uniforms, are blocking the road to the bridge. A car with S.S. Capt. Steiner (Gordon Pinsent) and two civilians pulls up. When asked for his documents, Steiner gets out of the car and stomps on Carter's foot. Carter lets out a yell in English and Steiner pulls a gun on them. Steiner drives off and Hogan tells his men to cancel the sabotage. Back at camp, Hogan wonders why Steiner did not do anything to them. The next day, the three Germans arrive at camp. Steiner introduces Professor Bauer (John Stephenson) and Dr. Riemann (Ben Wright) to Klink. They ask Klink if they can stay at the camp for a few days. Klink summons Hogan to his office and when Steiner does not say anything, Hogan is relieved. Later, the three come to the men's barracks. It seems that Bauer and Riemann are atomic scientists and along with Steiner, they want to leave Germany rather the help the Nazis develop an atomic bomb. When they prove what they say is true, Hogan agrees to get them to London. Hogan learns that Major Hochstetter is coming to arrest the three men. Hogan finds a way to have Hochstetter unknowingly get the three men out of camp.
159	15	"Easy Come, Easy Go"	Edward H. Feldman	Laurence Marks	January 10, 1971	37784-159
General Burkhalter arrives at camp with beautiful Eva (Cynthia Lynn) and Greta. They are there to wine and dine Hogan. Burkhalter would like Hogan to go to England and steal a P-51 fighter for the Nazis. He offers Hogan one million dollars and safe conduct to Switzerland. A Luftwaffe officer will accompany Hogan. Failure to come back means death for all the men in his barracks. Hogan turns them down. But back in the barracks Hogan remembers Burkhalter let slip that there is a German spy-ring in England. The officer who goes with him will know how to contact them. Hogan can pass that information to the Allies so they can break up the ring. Hogan learns Klink will be going with him. Hogan and Klink are at a London air base. Lieutenant Mills (Stewart Moss) manages to drug Klink. Hogan meets with some Generals and they come up with a plan. Hogan and Klink meet with spy-ring contact Schindler and Hogan gives his location to the Generals. While flying the "stolen" plane, Hogan cuts the engine and pretends it is out of gas. Hogan and Klink have to parachute out and the plane crashes. George Gaynes as General. Tom Hatten as Air Force Captain. Paul Lambert as Colonel Forbes. William Beckley as RAF Intelligence Man. Frank Parker as Lieutenant.
160	16	"The Meister Spy"	Bruce Bilson	R.S. Allen, Harvey Bullock	January 17, 1971	37784-164
A couple of airmen are brought to Stalag 13 after their aircraft crash-landed nearby. Lieutenant Miller is brought to Hogan and authenticates himself. Major Martin (Alan Bergmann), however, is taken to Klink's office. The men eavesdrop on Klink's office and learn that Martin is really Hans Strausser, a German spy. He had to leave London and has complete details regarding a planned Allied offensive. Hans will meet some contacts that evening in Hammelburg. Hans leaves the office. Hogan and Miller convince Klink that Hans' story is a complete lie intended to provide an opportunity to escape. Klink locks a stunned Strausser in the cooler. Hogan wants to find out who has been passing the information to Strausser. That night, Hogan pretends to be Strausser, and with Carter, they go to the meeting. Hogan passes bogus information about the offensive to Herr Mayerink, Fraulein Kissinger and Herr Schneer (Oscar Beregi). Hogan is unable to learn who the traitor in London is, but Carter takes pictures of the three. Hogan comes up with an elaborate plan involving Carter dressed as Hilter to get Strausser to reveal his contact in London.
161	17	"That's No Lady, That's My Spy"	Jerry London	Arthur Julian	January 24, 1971	37784-162
Outside of camp, Hogan and his men pass on valuable information to Underground leader Oskar Danzig (Jon Cedar). Before the war, Danzig was a master of disguises. Suddenly, they are all caught in a Gestapo ambush and LeBeau is shot. Back at camp, they realize the bullet only grazed LeBeau. The men learn that Danzig was seriously wounded and is in urgent need of penicillin. He is the only one who can complete the mission and pass the info to the Allies. Later, Klink tells the men that he has been made an honorary chairman for a fundraising committee. He will be throwing a tea party for several General's wives and wants the men to help. That night, Newkirk and Carter get the air dropped penicillin and are almost caught by Gestapo. Hogan believes if Newkirk could pose as one of the wives, he could get a ride into town after the party and get the medicine to the Underground. At the party, General Burkhalter notices that there is one too many women. Knowing that Danzig is a female impersonator, he wants Klink to call the Gestapo. Klink says he can spot the impostor, but picks the wrong person, Mrs. Mannheim (Alice Ghostley). She is quite upset and Newkirk is able to drive Mrs. Mannheim into town and deliver the penicillin.
162	18	"To Russia Without Love"	Bruce Bilson	Arthur Julian	January 31, 1971	37784-163
A German officer arrives at camp. The men eavesdrop on the conversation in Klink's office. Colonel Becker (H.M. Wynant) tells Klink and General Burkhalter that he is on his way to Berlin to deliver plans for an offensive at Staligard. Hogan is invited to dine with the three that evening. Hogan and Becker are left alone. Becker says he would like Hogan's help in being transferred from the Russian front to Stalag 13. Later that night, Newkirk and Hogan steal the plans but then are caught by Becker. Becker says he'll let Hogan see the plans once he gets him transferred. Back in the barracks, Hogan says that in order to get Klink to want to transfer, he'll need the help of Underground agent Olga Meissner (Ruta Lee), who happens to speak Russian. Olga convinces Klink that going to Russia will be a fast track to getting promoted to General and there is lots of partying with sexy Russian women. Werner Klemperer, as the newly combat-eager Klink, spoofs George C. Scott's role in Patton. Despite Burkhalter initially saying no, Klink finds a way for him and Schultz to be transferred and Becker brought to Stalag 13. Becker double crosses Hogan and does not let him see the plans. The men subdue Becker and prepare to send him to London. Hogan finds a way to have Klink and Schultz stay in Camp and to have Klink believe Becker was killed by a mine.
163	19	"Klink for the Defense"	Jerry London	Bill Davenport	February 7, 1971	37784-167
Hogan meets with Luftwaffe Col. Hauptmann (Sandy Kenyon) in a remote farmhouse. Hauptmann tells Hogan that the Gestapo is on to him and he will no longer be able to provide information to him. Hauptmann has a detailed map of important German defense locations. He will provide the map to the Allies, but only if he delivers it to London in person. After Hogan leaves, Maj. Hochstetter bursts in and arrests Hauptmann. The men learn from Schultz that Hauptmann was arrested for treason. He is being held at Stalag 13 because he is a national hero and they want to keep it out of the public eye. After the court martial, he will be executed. General Burkhalter will be the prosecutor and he makes Klink the defender. Newkirk talks to Hauptmann, but Hauptmann refuses to says where the map is. Hauptmann does say that all the evidence they have are recordings of phone calls that are in Klink's safe. LeBeau manages to get the recordings from the safe. The men fabricate new recordings and return them to the safe. During the trial, Burkhalter questions Fraülein Hibbler, who was Hauptmann's secretary and who made the recordings. Because of a story that Hogan tells Klink, he is able to discredit Hibbler and she is arrested. Hauptmann is then freed.
164	20	"The Kamikazes Are Coming"	Edward H. Feldman	Richard M. Powell	February 21, 1971	37784-166
The men find a new type of rocket that landed near camp. Hogan would love to be able to send it to London, but it is too large. Marya (Nita Talbot), the White Russian, arrives at camp with Dr. Otto von Bornemann (Henry Corden). Otto is the man that made the rocket and they are at camp to look for it. Marya told Otto that Hogan had worked with the Allied missile program and he might be able to help. Marya and Hogan are alone and she asks him where the rocket is. Hogan does not trust Marya, but she makes him give up the location. The rocket is brought into camp and Marya wants to talk to Hogan again. She tells him she wants to steal the rocket but Hogan does not know how that's possible. Marya helps the men gain access to the rocket. Otto finds the rocket missing and Marya sends him to various locations in camp to look for it. Maj. Hochstetter shows up and wants to search the camp again. Marya tells Hochstetter that Hogan has defected to their side. Hogan gives them a location where the rocket was taken out of camp. Hogan and Marya blackmail Otto into manning the rocket to London. Hogan then comes up with a story for Hochstetter as to why the rocket was fired. Timeline: At the end, Hogan refers to Otto as a kamikaze -- a term which began to circulate on the world press at the end of October 1944 and came into widespread use within a month. Thus, The Kamikazes Are Coming is set at some point over the last six full months of WW2.
165	21	"Kommandant Gertrude"	Bruce Bilson	Laurence Marks	February 28, 1971	37784-161
The men are outside of camp and see someone bail out of an Allied plane that was hit. The men then find General Sharp (Johnny Haymer) and bring him to Stalag 13. Back at camp, Klink is entertaining beautiful Karen Richter (Leslie Parrish), not knowing she is an Underground agent. When he leaves the room for a moment, she looks through some of his papers. Karen later tells Hogan that she saw plans to move the guard towers further into the woods. Hogan worries that the towers will now block their escape tunnels. Klink tells Hogan that General Burkhalter and his sister, Gertrude Linkmeyer (Kathleen Freeman), will be coming for an inspection. Gertrude introduces to Klink her fiancé, Major Wolfgang Karp (Lee Bergere). Burkhalter tells Klink that Wolfgang will be his new adjutant. Meanwhile, General Sharp is tired of being stuck at camp and wants out. Klink throws an engagement party and Gertrude tells Hogan that Wolfgang might take Klink's job some day. Hogan finds a way to have Wolfgang stop the moving of the towers. They will now be able to get Sharp out of camp. But then, Gertrude has Wolfgang suggest to Klink to put a guard in every barracks. Hogan realizes that Gertrude is starting to run the camp and he needs to get rid of her. Hogan has Karen break up Wolfgang and Gertrude. Timeline: Wolfgang is transferred to Stalingrad, placing Kommandant Gertrude in 1942 -- the last episode to be set this early. The remaining three episodes are evidently set in 1945.
166	22	"Hogan's Double Life"	Bruce Bilson	Phil Sharp	March 7, 1971	37784-165
Field Marshal Von Leiter (John Hoyt) is having his birthday party in town. Klink has not received an invitation yet. Major Pruhst (Malachi Throne) of the Gestapo comes to see Klink. The men are eavesdropping on the conversation. Pruhst believes that Hogan is responsible for many of the sabotage incidents that has been going on in the area. He even has a witness to a bridge being destroyed that claims to have seen the man responsible. Pruhst wants a picture of Hogan to send to the witness in Berlin. Despite Hogan trying to avoid Prusht, a picture is taken. Pruhst gets a call from the witness who confirms it is Hogan. Hogan listens in as Pruhst says he'll arrest Hogan in the morning. Hogan dresses up as a German officer and goes to Von Leiter's party. He passes himself off as Captain Eric Shroffstein, an old friend of Von Leiter's. Pruhst and Klink show up and recognize Hogan despite his disguise. When Pruhst and Klink call out Hogan, Von Leiter comes to his defense. Knowing Hogan cannot be in two places at the same time, Pruhst and Klink rush back to camp. Hogan makes it back to camp before Pruhst and Klink do. The two now believe that Shroffstein was the person the witness saw and they head back to the party. Dick Wilson as Underground Agent Bruner.
167	23	"Look at the Pretty Snowflakes"	Irving J. Moore	Arthur Julian	March 21, 1971	37784-168
The men get a message from London that they planned an airstrike against General Strommberger's (Harold J. Stone) Panzer division outside of Hammelburg. Because of it snowing quite heavily the airstrike is called off. Strommberger comes to camp and needs some of Klink's men to clear snow off a road he is using. The men are eavesdropping on the conversation. Hogan works it so his men are sent to clear the road, but they'll actually bring some dynamite. The men are waiting in a bar in Hammelburg for the picks and shovels. Because of a mix up, they have lost their explosives and have to find another way to stop the Panzers. Klink tells them that snowplows have arrived and they will not have to shovel. Hogan finds a way for them to still stay in town. Strommberger comes by and chains the men together. He mentions that there is an avalanche hanging over the pass by the Panzers. After he leaves, the men play the instruments in the bar hoping to trigger the avalanche, but it does not work. Knowing what the men tried to do, Strommberger wants them sent back to camp. Something Klink does triggers the avalanche and blocks the pass.
168	24	"Rockets or Romance"	Marc Daniels	Arthur Julian	April 4, 1971	37784-156
The men are doing some road work outside of camp with Schultz guarding them. Major Heintzen (Norman Alden) drives up with a flat tire and asks Schultz to have the men change the tire. Heintzen, who is really with the Underground, tells Hogan that three mobile rocket launchers have been moved into the area. They know the general location where two of them are, but Hogan needs to find the third and report to London. General Burkhalter is speaking with Klink and the men are eavesdropping. He says that one rocket launcher will be placed in camp. It will be fired at England the next day to coincide with an all out Blitz. London wants the location of the two launchers and the men will have to destroy the one in camp themselves. Hogan goes to the lookout shack to meet an agent and try to spot the launchers. Lily Frankel (Marlyn Mason) shows up and things get quite cozy between the two. Lily comes up with a way to alter the course of the rocket in camp. When Hogan sends a message back to his men, a radio detection truck picks up his location. Lily spots the two launchers, Hogan sends a message to the bombers and the rockets are destroyed. Newkirk and Baker find a way to send the detection truck in another direction. Timeline: Hogan says that he has been at Stalag 13 for three years, placing this episode in 1945. Final episode of the series.

== Home releases ==
The following DVD sets were released by CBS Home Entertainment.

DVD set	Episodes	Release date
Hogan's Heroes: The Complete First Season	32	March 15, 2005
Hogan's Heroes: The Complete Second Season	30	September 27, 2005
Hogan's Heroes: The Complete Third Season	30	March 7, 2006
Hogan's Heroes: The Complete Fourth Season	26	August 15, 2006
Hogan's Heroes: The Complete Fifth Season	26	December 19, 2006
Hogan's Heroes: The Sixth & Final Season	24	June 5, 2007
Hogan's Heroes: Kommandant's Kollection – The Complete Series	168	November 24, 2009
