= Borzysławiec =

- Village
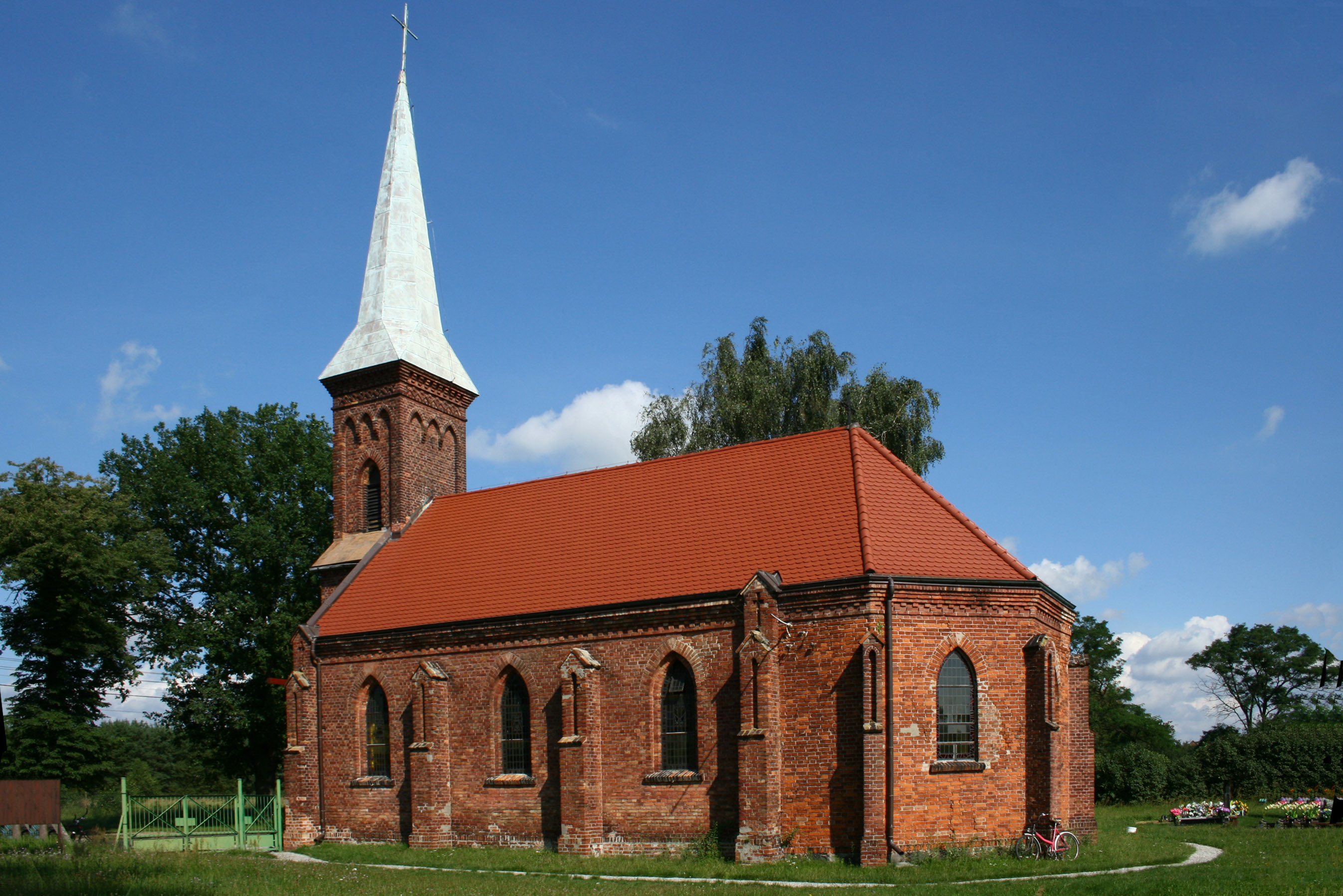
- Church of Saints Peter and Paul

- Location within Poland
- Coordinates: 53°31′N 14°43′E
- Country: Poland
- Voivodeship: West Pomeranian
- County: Goleniów
- Gmina: Goleniów

Population
  - Total: 90

Borzysławiec [bɔʐɨˈswavjɛt͡s] (German: Louisenthal) is a village in the administrative district of Gmina Goleniów, within Goleniów County, West Pomeranian Voivodeship, in north-western Poland. It lies approximately 8 km (5 mi) south-west of Goleniów and 15 km (9 mi) north-east of the regional capital Szczecin.

== History ==
In 1809 August Heinrich von Borgstede, proprietor of the Rörchen manor estate near Lübzin (renamed as Lubczyna in 1946) and secretary of the Marcher War and Demesne Chamber, granted larger grounds for the foundation of a new village. The area was former moorland drained in a campaign started at the end of the 18th century. The vast drained lands had been part of the flatlands along the Dammscher See (now Jezioro Dąbskie). The village was then founded in 1809 as Louisenthal (later also altered as Luisenthal). A neighbouring newly founded hamlet of Rörchen bore the name Friedrichwilhelmsthal (aka Friedrich-Wilhelmsthal), thus both using the names of the then ruling royal couple.

Many settlers came from Pomeranian Hoppenwalde and Viereck. Unlike their prevailingly Lutheran fellow Pomeranians they were Roman Catholic since these villages had been settled under Fredrick the Great by immigrants from the County of Sponheim. They preserved a particular Palatine dialect. Among Louisenthal's first inhabitants were Johann Franz Petri (1781–1839) and Johann Valentin Petri (1786–1835) from Viereck. In 1816 Johann Wilhelm Thomas moved in from Hoppenwalde, marrying the Louisenthal native Maria Carolina Senft in 1835. Like all the Roman Catholics in Brandenburgian Pomerania they initially formed part of the parish of the St. John the Baptist Church in Stettin, formed in 1722. However, Louisenthal built its own little half-timbered chapel holding the first Catholic mass there in 1820. The Louisenthal curacy counted 146 souls in 1827.

Louisenthal was laid out in northsouth direction as a long linear village. The main street was planted with three lines of linden, oaks and chestnut trees. This structure is mostly preserved until today. The village structure is dominated by the Catholic Saints Peter and Paul Church, surrounded by a churchyard used as the cemetery. Louisenthal curacy was elevated to the rank of a parish in 1866.

Later also Lutherans moved to Louisenthal, thus in 1867 the village counted 458 inhabitants, among them 227 Catholics. The Lutherans belonged to the Lutheran parish of Lübzin. Louisenthal consisted of 40 farm homesteads, two handicraft businesses and about 60 buildings forming the agricultural inventory in 1867. The village measured 321 hectares (790 acres) of arable land, of which 103 hectares (250 acres) were used as ploughlands, 195 hectares (480 acres) as meadows and 20 hectares (49 acres) of pasturages.

According to the census of 1 December 1871 there were 451 inhabitants, of which 230 were Lutheran and 221 Catholic. The inhabitants formed 85 households in 39 homesteads, spreading in the linear village and in other small outlying hamlets. These were Dammhorst, Krachtshorst, Langenhorst and Seebudenlake.

In 1901 the municipality of Louisenthal was incorporated into Lübzin. On 2 December 1902 the present Ss. Peter and Paul Church was consecrated, replacing the older structure. As the sole Catholic village in the wide Diaspora of the then prevailingly Lutheran Farther Pomerania the parish then comprised many other villages and towns on the eastern bank of the Oder such as Alt Fanger, Barfußdorf, Birkenwerder, Blankenfelde, Buddendorf, Burow, Daarz, Damerfitz, Diedrichsdorf, Eichenwalde, Franzfelde, Freiheide, Friedrichswalde, Fürstenflagge, Glewitz, Gollnow, Gollnowshagen, Groß Christinenberg, Groß Sophienthal, Großenhagen, Hackenwalde, Hinzendorf, Ihnamünde, Immenthal, Jakobsdorf, Karlsbach, Karlshof, Kattenhof, Klein Christinenberg, Klein Sophienthal, Korkenhagen, Kriewitz, Lübzin, Lüttkenhagen, Marsdorf, Massow, Matzdorf, Münchendorf, Neu Massow, Neuendorf bei Massow, Pflugrade, Priemhausen, Puddenzig, Resehl, Retztow, Rosenow, Rörchen, Schönhagen, Speck, Stevenhagen and Wangeritz. Among the 40,000 overall inhabitants in the Kreis Naugard there were about 400 Catholics in the 1870s. Only in 1930 a second Catholic parish in Naugard district was founded, St. George in Gollnow, taking over about 250 parishioners.

On 1 May 1931 Albert Hirsch (1894–1944) became parish priest at Ss. Peter and Paul in Louisenthal, then counting 127 parishioners. On 2 March 1943, in the course of the arrestation campaign against Pomeranian Catholics, the Fall Stettin, Hirsch was incarcerated too and on 30 July 1943 sued in one of the Nazi special courts for having listened to enemy broadcast, spreading anti-regime opinions and pastoring Polish forced labourers, working on farms in his parish. He was sentenced to four years of jail in the Gollnow prison, where his colleague Jerzy Kubiak from Gollnow's St. George's visited him as the prison chaplain. Hirsch, suffering from doing forced labour, died in prison from exhaustion and hunger on 22 August 1944. He was buried next to his mother in Louisenthal, and his grave in the village cemetery is preserved. His diocese of Berlin commemorates him as one of the martyrs under National Socialism.

1945 many village people fled before the invading Soviet forces. The remaining inhabitants were expelled in the course of the ethnic cleansing in June and July 1945, acknowledged in August by the three Allies at the Potsdam Agreement. The village was renamed as Borzysław in 1945, and later as Borzysławiec.

== Population ==
Population
Year	Pop.	±%
1867	458	—
1871	451	−1.5%
1895	355	−21.3%
1905	209	−41.1%
2000	87	−58.4%
2008	72	−17.2%
Source: See footnotes

== Sources ==
- Gemeindelexikon für den Freistaat Preußen. Provinz Pommern. Nach dem endgültigen Ergebnis der Volkszählung vom 16. Juni 1925 und anderen amtlichen Quellen unter Zugrundelegung des Gebietsstandes vom 1. Oktober 1932. Berlin: Preußisches Statistisches Landesamt (ed.), 1932, p. 48
- H. Hampel, Sprache der 1748 aus der Grafschaft Sponheim bei Creuznach eingewanderten Unterpfälzer, mit geschichtlicher Einleitung.
- Karl-Otto Konow, Geschichte des Dorfes Lübzin in Pommern, Siegen: J.-G.-Herder-Bibliothek Siegerland, 1987
