= Expressway S3 (Poland) =

Expressway in Poland connecting Baltic Sea with Czech Republic

Expressway S3
- Droga ekspresowa S3

Route information
- Part of E65
- Length: 470.6 km (292.4 mi)

Major junctions
- From: Świnoujście
- merge with A6 east of Szczecin separation from A6 south of Szczecin; A2 near Jordanowo A4 near Legnica
- To: D11 border with Czech Republic

Location
- Country: Poland
- Regions: West Pomeranian Voivodeship; Lubusz Voivodeship; Lower Silesian Voivodeship
- Major cities: Szczecin, Gorzów Wielkopolski, Zielona Góra, Legnica

Highway system
- National roads in Poland; Voivodeship roads
← S 2	→ S 5

Expressway S3 or express road S3 (in Polish droga ekspresowa S3) is a Polish highway, which runs from Świnoujście on the Baltic Sea through Szczecin, Gorzów Wielkopolski, Zielona Góra and Legnica, to the border with the Czech Republic, where it will connect to the planned D11 motorway.

The road was constructed from 2008 until 2025. Its total length is 470.6 km (292.4 mi), but the last 3 km near the border remain closed to traffic until the connecting stretch of the D11 motorway is constructed in Czech Republic. This stretch is expected to be opened in late 2026.

== Route ==
Section	Length	Constructed	Notes
Świnoujście – Troszyn	33.0 km (20.51 mi)	2020 – 2025	
Troszyn, Parłówko, Ostromice bypass	4.2 km (2.61 mi)	2009 – 2012	
Ostromice – Miękowo	22.1 km (13.73 mi)	2017 – 2021	
Miękowo bypass	4.8 km (2.98 mi)	2009 – 2012	
Miękowo – Rzęśnica	21.8 km (13.55 mi)	In the 1970s with at-grade intersections, Reconstructed 2019 – 2020	
Rzęśnica – Szczecin Klucz	18.3 km (11.37 mi)	In the 1930s by Nazi Germany, Reconstructed 2007 – 2021	Concurrency with
Szczecin Klucz – Gorzów Wielkopolski	81.6 km (50.70 mi)	2007/2008 – 2010	
Gorzów Wielkopolski bypass	11.7 km (7.27 mi)	Single carriageway: 2001 – 2007; Second carriageway: 2014 – 2017	
Gorzów Wielkopolski – Międzyrzecz	37 km (22.99 mi)	2011 – 2014	
Międzyrzecz bypass	6.4 km (3.98 mi)	Single carriageway: 2004 – 2006; Second carriageway: 2014 – 2016	
Międzyrzecz – Sulechów	43 km (26.72 mi)	2010 – 2013	
Sulechów – Nowa Sól	44 km (27.34 mi)	Single carriageway: 1985 – 1995, 2006 – 2008; Second carriageway: 2015 – 2018	
Nowa Sól – Polkowice	33.3 km (20.69 mi)	2014 – 2018	
Polkowice – Lubin	14.4 km (8.95 mi)	2014 – 2021	
Lubin – Legnica – Bolków	69.7 km (43.31 mi)	2015 – 2018	
Bolków – Kamienna Góra	16.1 km (10.00 mi)	2020 – 2024	Includes two tunnels: 2300m and 320m long
Kamienna Góra – Lubawka	15.3 km (9.51 mi)	2020 – 2023	The last 3 km are finished, but remain closed until the connecting D11 motorway is constructed in Czech Republic

== History ==
=== Initial route plans (autostrada A3) ===
The autostrada A3 was a motorway planned from 1993 to 2001 that was supposed to run from Szczecin to Lubawka on the Czech–Polish border. Some road maps published in the 1990s depicted an approximate route of the motorway, which in some places was different from the final route of S3, most notably the motorway was supposed to form north-eastern bypass of Legnica while S3 was constructed as its western bypass.

In 2001 the decision was made to build a lower standard "express road" as the traffic density was judged too low to justify a motorway. One legacy of the road having been planned as an autostrada is that from the beginning it was being constructed on a completely new alignment some distance away from the old route of the DK3 road. This is akin to how most expressways in Poland are constructed nowadays, but in contrast to the standards of the 2000s when most of the expressways were being constructed by upgrading existing roads. Like other modern Polish expressways, S3 shares the crucial properties of an autostrada, including physical separation, restricted access, all interchanges being grade-separated, and at least two continuous lanes in each direction as well as emergency lanes (hard shoulder).

=== Świnoujście – Szczecin ===
One section of S3 east of Szczecin (19 km) was constructed in the 1970s in an expressway standard of those times, featuring one-level intersections and a pedestrian crossing. It was reconstructed in 2019–2020 to contemporary standards, with the intersections and the pedestrian crossing upgraded to grade-separated ones.

S3 south of Szczecin overlaps with A6 motorway (see Autostrada A6: History of construction).

=== Szczecin – Legnica ===
A single carriageway was constructed in years 1985–1995 on the section Sulechów–Zielona Góra (27 km). Three short sections were constructed in years 2001–2008, also with the first carriageway only.

The first large section of S3 was the stretch from Szczecin to Gorzów Wielkopolski (82 km), opened to traffic in 2010, followed by the stretch from Gorzów Wielkopolski to Sulechów (80.6 km), opened to traffic in 2013/2014. The new sections had two carriageways, separated by the older stretches (Sulechów–Nowa Sól, Gorzów Wielkopolski bypass and Międzyrzecz bypass) which still remained as single-carriageway.

In 2014–2017/2018, the expressway between Nowa Sól and Legnica (junction with A4) was constructed, and the second carriageway was added on the three older stretches. The exception was the section Polkowice - Lubin, which was also contracted to be completed in the first half of 2018, but the deal with Salini Impregilo was terminated in 2019 due to extensive delays in construction. It was ultimately opened to traffic in 2021.

=== Legnica – border with Czech Republic ===
Signing the contracts for construction of all four stretches between A4 at Legnica and the Czech border was planned for 2014. However, in 2013 the officials announced that the section will not enter into construction yet, because delays in preparations in the Czech Republic meant that the connecting motorway on the Czech side of the border might enter into construction no earlier than 2018 (ultimately, the delays on the Czech side turned out to be even larger and the construction of the connecting stretch is expected to start in 2024 rather than in 2018). Some of the money allocated for it has been re-purposed to build the S2 expressway in Warsaw.

Later the decision was partially reversed, and in 2014 two tenders were opened for the section between Legnica and Bolków. This part (35.8 km) was constructed in years 2015–2018. The two remaining design-build contracts for the section from Bolków to the Czech border were signed in October 2018. The section from Kamienna Góra to the border was opened in September 2023, while the section from Bolków to Kamienna Góra was opened in July 2024.

== Exit list ==
Country	Voivodeship	Location	km	mi	Exit	Name	Destinations	Notes
Poland	West Pomeranian Voivodeship	Świnoujście			—	Roundabout near Warszów	DK 3 / E65 – Ystad via Ferry; DK 93 – Świnoujście via the Świnoujście Tunnel	Northern endpoint of expressway Kilometrage starting point
Poland	West Pomeranian Voivodeship	Świnoujście			1	Świnoujście	Warszów	Incomplete junction: no exit ramp Szczecin → Świnoujście; no entry ramp Świnoujście → Szczecin
Poland	West Pomeranian Voivodeship	Świnoujście			2	LNG	Świnoujście LNG terminal	
Poland	West Pomeranian Voivodeship	Świnoujście			3	Łunowo	Łunowo; Świnoujście LNG terminal (planned)	
Poland	West Pomeranian Voivodeship	Gmina Międzyzdroje			4	Międzyzdroje	DW 102 – Międzyzdroje	
Poland	West Pomeranian Voivodeship	Gmina Wolin			5	Dargobądz	Dargobądz	
Poland	West Pomeranian Voivodeship	Gmina Wolin			6	Wolin Zachód	Wolin	Zachód means west
Poland	West Pomeranian Voivodeship	Gmina Wolin			7	Wolin Wschód	DW 111 – Goleniów	Wschód means east
Poland	West Pomeranian Voivodeship	Gmina Wolin			8	Parłówko	DW 107 – Kamień Pomorski DW 108 – Golczewo/Płoty; Ostromice	
Poland	West Pomeranian Voivodeship	Gmina Przybiernów			9	Brzozowo	Brzozowo	
Poland	West Pomeranian Voivodeship	Gmina Przybiernów			10	Przybiernów	Przybiernów	
Poland	West Pomeranian Voivodeship	Gmina Przybiernów			11	Babigoszcz	Babigoszcz	
Poland	West Pomeranian Voivodeship	Gmina Goleniów			12	Miękowo	Miękowo/Stepnica	
Poland	West Pomeranian Voivodeship	Gmina Goleniów			13	Goleniów Północ interchange	S 6 / E28 – Gdańsk/Solidarity Szczecin–Goleniów Airport	Northern End of concurrency with Expressway S6 (temporary) modified trumpet interchange planned extension of Expressway S6 will end here Północ means north
Poland	West Pomeranian Voivodeship	Gmina Goleniów			14	Goleniów Zachód	DW 111 – Recław; Goleniów/Święta	Zachód means west
Poland	West Pomeranian Voivodeship	Gmina Goleniów			15	Goleniów Południe	Rurka/Goleniów/Lubczyna	Południe means south
Poland	West Pomeranian Voivodeship	Gmina Goleniów			16	Kliniska	Stawno/Kliniska Wielkie	
Poland	West Pomeranian Voivodeship	Gmina Goleniów			17	Rzęśnica	DW 142 – Chociwel	
Poland	West Pomeranian Voivodeship	Gmina Goleniów			—	—	A 6 / E28 S 3 / E65	Southern End of concurrency with Expressway S6 (temporary) Road continues as common section of A6 autostrada and expressway S3 with kilometrage of A6
Poland	West Pomeranian Voivodeship	Szczecin			6	Szczecin Dąbie	Szczecin-Dąbie/Szczecin-Wielgowo	Exit number part of A6 autostrada
Poland	West Pomeranian Voivodeship	Szczecin			5	Szczecin Kijewo interchange	DK 10 — Szczecin-Centrum/Lubieszyn/Bydgoszcz	Exit number part of A6 autostrada cloverleaf interchange planned Expressway S10 will start here Centrum means center
Poland	West Pomeranian Voivodeship	Szczecin			4	Szczecin Podjuchy	Szczecin-Podjuchy	Exit number part of A6 autostrada
Poland	West Pomeranian Voivodeship	Szczecin			18	Szczecin Klucz interchange	A 6 / E28 — Szczecin-Gumieńce/Kołbaskowo/Berlin	Southern End of concurrency with A6 autostrada Semi-directional T interchange
Poland	West Pomeranian Voivodeship	Gmina Gryfino			19	Gryfino	DW 120 — Gryfino/Stare Czarnowo	
Poland	West Pomeranian Voivodeship	Gmina Banie			20	Pyrzyce	DW 122 — Pyrzyce/Krajnik Dolny	
Poland	West Pomeranian Voivodeship	Gmina Myślibórz			21	Myślibórz	DK 26 — Myślibórz/Krajnik Dolny	
Poland	Lubusz Voivodeship	Gorzów Wielkopolski			22	Gorzów Wielkopolski Północ	DW 130 — Dębno/Gorzów Wielkopolski-K-S SSE/Gorzów Wielkopolski-Centrum	Północ means north Centrum means center
Poland	Lubusz Voivodeship	Gorzów Wielkopolski			23	Gorzów Wielkopolski Zachód	DW 132 — Kostryn nad Odrą/Gorzów Wielkopolski-Centrum	Zachód means west Centrum means center
Poland	Lubusz Voivodeship	Gorzów Wielkopolski			24	Gorzów Wielkopolski Południe	DK 22 — Gorzów Wielkopolski-Centrum/Wałcz/Gdańsk/Kostryn nad Odrą	Południe means south Centrum means center
Poland	Lubusz Voivodeship	Gmina Skwierzyna			25	Skwierzyna Zachód	Skwierzyna/Deszczno; DK 24 — Kostryn nad Odrą	Northern End of concurrency with national road 24 Zachód means west
Poland	Lubusz Voivodeship	Gmina Skwierzyna			26	Skwierzyna Południe	Skwierzyna; DK 24 — Poznań	Southern End of concurrency with national road 24 Południe means south
Poland	Lubusz Voivodeship	Gmina Międzyrzecz			27	Międzyrzecz Północ	Międzyrzecz	Północ means north
Poland	Lubusz Voivodeship	Gmina Międzyrzecz			28	Międzyrzecz Zachód	DW 137 — Międzyrzecz/Sulęcin/Trzciel	Zachód means west
Poland	Lubusz Voivodeship	Gmina Międzyrzecz			29	Międzyrzecz Południe	Międzyrzecz	Południe means south
Poland	Lubusz Voivodeship	Gmina Świebodzin			30	Jordanowo interchange	A 2 / E30 — Świecko/Poznań	interchange equipped with toll station double trumpet interchange
Poland	Lubusz Voivodeship	Gmina Świebodzin			31	Świebodzin Północ	Świebodzin/Świecko/Poznań with access to DK 92	Północ means north
Poland	Lubusz Voivodeship	Gmina Świebodzin			32	Świebodzin Południe	Świebodzin/Krosno Odrzańskie (southbound); DK 92 — Świebodzin/Świecko/Poznań (northbound)	Południe means south
Poland	Lubusz Voivodeship	Gmina Sulechów			33	Sulechów	DK 32 — Poznań; Sulechów/Cigacice	Northern End of concurrency with national road 32
Poland	Lubusz Voivodeship	Zielona Góra			34	Zielona Góra Północ	DK 32 — Zielona Góra-Strefa Aktywności Gospodarczej, Centrum, Osiedle Pomorskie/Gubinek/Krosno Odrzańskie	Southern End of concurrency with national road 32 Północ means north Centrum means center
Poland	Lubusz Voivodeship	Zielona Góra			35	Zielona Góra Południe	DW 282 — Zielona Góra-Racula/Zielona Góra-Stary Kisielin	Południe means south
Poland	Lubusz Voivodeship	Gmina Otyń			36	Niedoradz	Niedoradz/Otyń	Incomplete junction: no exit ramp Legnica → Niedoradz; no entry ramp Niedoradz → Legnica
Poland	Lubusz Voivodeship	Gmina Nowa Sól			37	Nowa Sól Zachód	DW 297 — Nowa Sól/Kożuchów; K-SSSE Nowa Sól DW 315 — Wolsztyn	Zachód means west
Poland	Lubusz Voivodeship	Gmina Nowe Miasteczko			38	Nowa Sól Południe	DW 333 — Nowe Miasteczko/Nowa Sól; Bytom Odrzański/Kożuchów	Południe means south
Poland	Lubusz Voivodeship	Gmina Nowe Miasteczko			39	Nowe Miasteczko	DW 333 — Nowe Miasteczko/Miłaków	
Poland	Lower Silesian Voivodeship	Gmina Gaworzyce			40	Gaworzyce	Gaworzyce/Kurów Wielki	
Poland	Lower Silesian Voivodeship	Gmina Radwanice			41	Głogów Zachód	DK 12 — Głogów/Leszno/Żary	Zachód means west
Poland	Lower Silesian Voivodeship	Gmina Jerzmanowa			42	Głogów Południe	DW 329 — Głogów	Południe means south
Poland	Lower Silesian Voivodeship	Gmina Polkowice			43	Polkowice Północ	Polkowice/Chocianów	Północ means north
Poland	Lower Silesian Voivodeship	Gmina Polkowice			44	Polkowice Południe	DW 331 — Polkowice/Chocianów	Incomplete junction: no exit ramp Zielona Góra → Polkowice; no entry ramp Polkowice → Zielona Góra Northern endpoint of the stretch with three lanes per carriageway Południe means south
Poland	Lower Silesian Voivodeship	Gmina Lubin			45	Lubin Północ	Lubin-Stadion/Rawicz/Góra with access to DK 36	Southern endpoint of the stretch with three lanes per carriageway Północ means north
Poland	Lower Silesian Voivodeship	Gmina Lubin			46	Lubin Zachód	DW 335 — Chojnów; Lubin-Centrum	Zachód means west Centrum means center
Poland	Lower Silesian Voivodeship	Gmina Lubin			47	Lubin Południe	DW 333 — Chróstnik/Lubin-Przylesie	Południe means south
Poland	Lower Silesian Voivodeship	Gmina Miłkowice			48	Legnica Północ	DW 333 — Legnica/Kochlice	Północ means north
Poland	Lower Silesian Voivodeship	Gmina Miłkowice			49	Legnica Zachód	DK 94 — Legnica/Zgorzelec	Zachód means west
Poland	Lower Silesian Voivodeship	Gmina Krotoszyce			50	Legnica Południe interchange	A 4 / E40 — Wrocław/Jędrzychowice/Zgorzelec	double trumpet interchange Południe means south
Poland	Lower Silesian Voivodeship	Jawor			51	Jawor Północ	Jawor/Nowa Wieś Legnicka	Północ means north
Poland	Lower Silesian Voivodeship	Gmina Paszowice			52	Jawor Wschód	Jawor/Strzegom/Świdnica	Wschód means east
Poland	Lower Silesian Voivodeship	Gmina Paszowice			53	Jawor Południe	Paszowice/Sokola	Południe means south
Poland	Lower Silesian Voivodeship	Gmina Bolków			54	Bolków	DK 3 / E65 — Jelenia Góra/Prague; DK 5 — Wrocław/Lubawka planned Expressway S5 will end here in a new interchange	
Poland	Lower Silesian Voivodeship	Gmina Kamienna Góra			55	Kamienna Góra Północ	DK 5 — Bolków/Kamienna Góra/Lubawka Północ means north	
Poland	Lower Silesian Voivodeship	Kamienna Góra			56	Kamienna Góra Południe	DW 367 — Kamienna Góra/Wałbrzych/Jelenia Góra Południe means south	
Poland	Lower Silesian Voivodeship	Gmina Lubawka			57	Lubawka	DW 369 — Lubawka/Jelenia Góra	
Poland	Lower Silesian Voivodeship	Gmina Lubawka			—	Czech Republic–Poland border	D11	border crossing planned Border with the Czech Republic Southern endpoint of expressway
1.000 mi = 1.609 km; 1.000 km = 0.621 mi: Concurrency terminus; Incomplete access; Proposed; Tolled

== See also ==
- Highways in Poland
- European route E65
