= Voivodeship road 111 =

Road in Poland

Voivodeship Road 111
- Droga wojewódzka nr 111

Route information
- Maintained by Zachodniopomorski Zarząd Dróg Wojewódzkich
- Length: 13.3 km (8.3 mi)

Location
- Country: Poland
- Regions: West Pomeranian Voivodeship
- Major cities: Goleniów

Highway system
- National roads in Poland; Voivodeship roads
← DW 110	→ DW 112

Voivodeship Road 111 (Polish: Droga wojewódzka nr 111, abbreviated DW 111) is a route in the Polish voivodeship roads network. The route links Recław near Wolin with the western bypass of Goleniów with the Expressway S3 and National Road 6. The route was separated from the Voivodeship Road 113 on 1 January 2013.

== Important settlements along the route ==
- Święta
- Modrzewie
- Goleniów

== Route plan ==
km	Icon	Name	Crossed roads
0.7		Święta	—
9.4		Modrzewie	
13.3		Goleniów	—
x		Świnoujście	—
x		Szczecin	—
x		Gdańsk	—
