= Voivodeship road 113 =

Road in Poland

Voivodeship Road 113
- Droga wojewódzka nr 113

Route information
- Maintained by Zachodnio Pomorski Zarząd Dróg Wojewódzkich
- Length: 19 km (12 mi)

Location
- Country: Poland
- Regions: West Pomeranian Voivodeship
- Major cities: Maszewo

Highway system
- National roads in Poland; Voivodeship roads
← DW 112	→ DW 114

Voivodeship road 113 (Polish: Droga wojewódzka nr 113, abbreviated DW 113) is a route in the Polish voivodeship roads network. The route runs through the Goleniów County. The route has 19 km in length.

== Important settlements along the route ==
- Żółwia Błoć
- Żółwia
- Mosty
- Jarosławki
- Maszewo

== Route plan ==
km	Icon	Name	Crossed roads
0		"Solidarity" Szczecin–Goleniów Airport	
3		Level crossing for the railway line in Goleniów	—
19		Maszewo	
