= Voivodeship road 112 =

Road in Poland

Voivodeship Road 112
- Droga wojewódzka nr 112

Route information
- Maintained by Zachodnio Pomorski Zarząd Dróg Wojewódzkich
- Length: 62 km (39 mi)
- Existed: 17 December 2020–present

Major junctions
- From: S 6 in Wicimice
- To: S 11 in Koszalin Zachód

Location
- Country: Poland
- Regions: West Pomeranian Voivodeship

Highway system
- National roads in Poland; Voivodeship roads
← DW 111	→ DW 113

Voivodeship Road 112 (Polish: Droga wojewódzka nr 112, abbreviated DW 112) is a route in the Polish voivodeship roads network. The route links the S6 expressway in Wicimice with the S11 expressway in Koszalin along an old routing of national road 6.

== Previous route ==
Between 2000 and 2014, DW 112 originally ran from Stepnica to Modrzewie. This became a portion of DW 111 on 1 January 2015.

== Important settlements along the route ==
- Wicimice
- Karlino
- Biesiekierz
- Stare Bielice

== Route plan ==
km	Icon	Name	Crossed roads
x		Level crossing in Stepnica	—
15		Modrzewie	
x		Święta	—
x		Maszewo	—
