= Smolno, West Pomeranian Voivodeship =

Coordinates: 53°30′36″N 14°44′20″E

Smolno
- Village
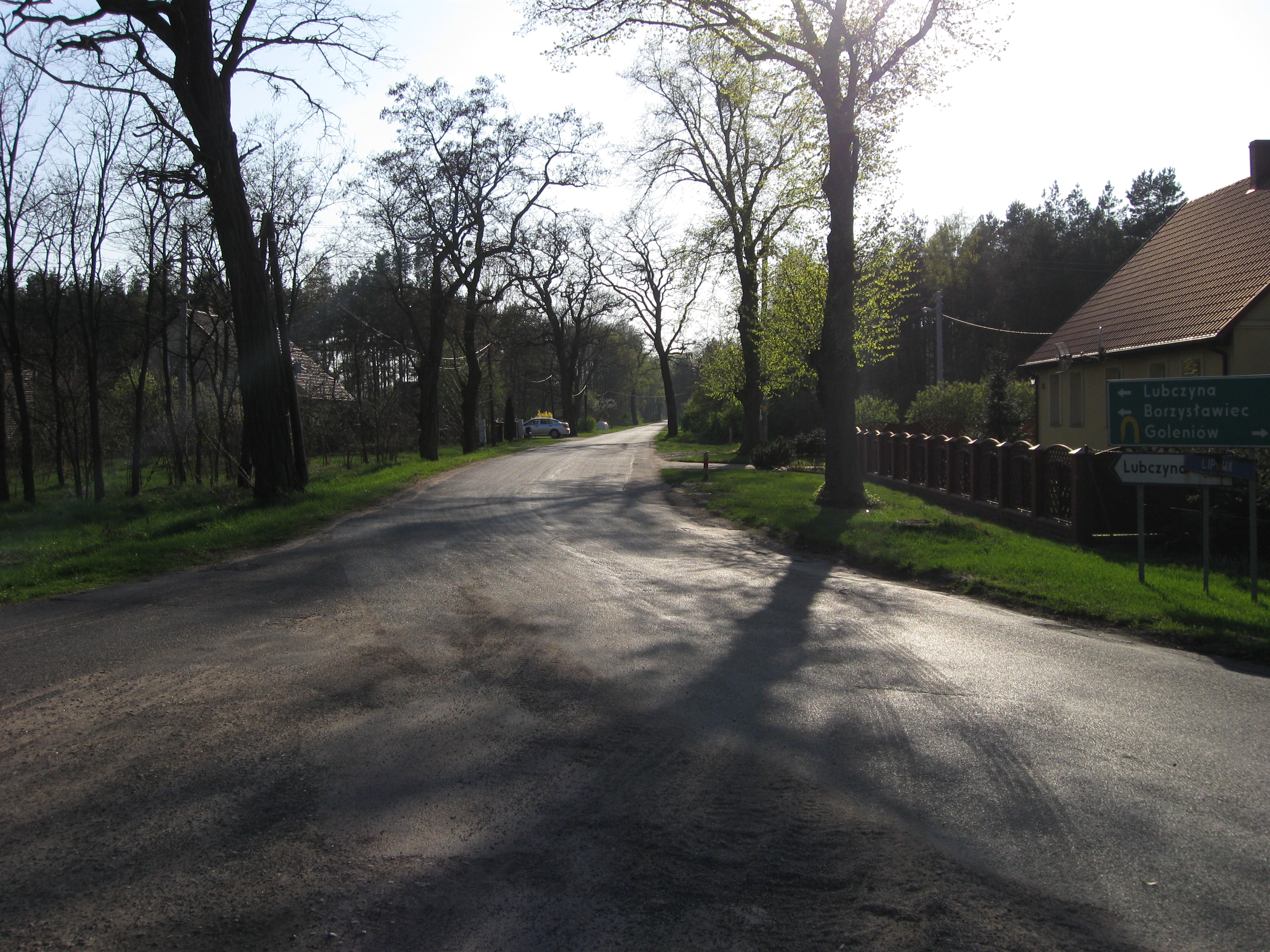
- Street of Smolno, West Pomeranian Voivodeship
- Interactive map of Smolno
- Country: Poland
- Voivodeship: West Pomeranian
- County: Goleniów
- Gmina: Goleniów

Smolno is a village in the administrative district of Gmina Goleniów, within Goleniów County, West Pomeranian Voivodeship, in north-western Poland.

For the history of the region, see History of Pomerania.
