= Bolechowo =

Bolechowo refers to the following places in Poland:

- Bolechowo, Greater Poland Voivodeship
- Bolechowo, West Pomeranian Voivodeship
