= Gniazdowo =

Gniazdowo may refer to the following places:

- Gniazdowo, Masovian Voivodeship (east-central Poland)
- Gniazdowo, Pomeranian Voivodeship (north Poland)
- Gniazdowo, Warmian-Masurian Voivodeship (north Poland)
- Gniazdowo, Goleniów County in West Pomeranian Voivodeship (north-west Poland)
- Gniazdowo, Koszalin County in West Pomeranian Voivodeship (north-west Poland)
