= Kamieniska =

- Settlement
- Location within Poland
- Coordinates: 53°32′44″N 14°38′28″E
- Country: Poland
- Voivodeship: West Pomeranian
- County: Goleniów
- Gmina: Goleniów

Kamieniska [kamjɛˈniska] (German: Brachhorst) is a settlement in the administrative district of Gmina Goleniów, within Goleniów County, West Pomeranian Voivodeship, in north-western Poland. It lies approximately 13 km (8 mi) west of Goleniów and 16 km (10 mi) north of the regional capital Szczecin.

For the history of the region, see History of Pomerania.
