= Trzebuskie Łęgi, West Pomeranian Voivodeship =

Coordinates: 53°26′28″N 14°42′45″E

Trzebuskie Łęgi
- Village
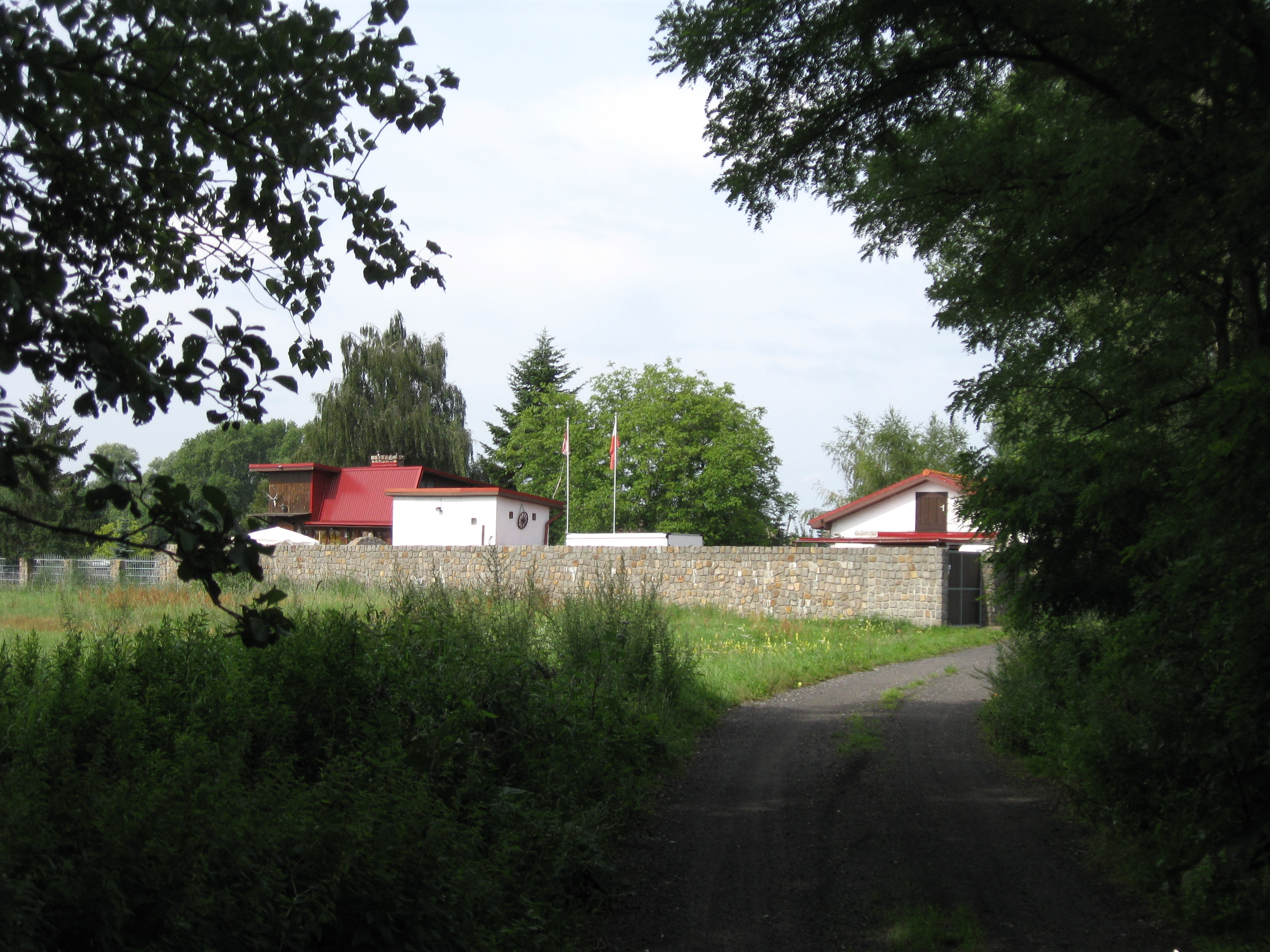
- Interactive map of Trzebuskie Łęgi
- Country: Poland
- Voivodeship: West Pomeranian
- County: Goleniów
- Gmina: Goleniów

Trzebuskie Łęgi is a village in the administrative district of Gmina Goleniów, within Goleniów County, West Pomeranian Voivodeship, in north-western Poland.

For the history of the region, see History of Pomerania.
