= Twarogi, West Pomeranian Voivodeship =

Twarogi
- Village
- Location within Poland
- Coordinates: 53°36′37″N 14°48′11″E
- Country: Poland
- Voivodeship: West Pomeranian
- County: Goleniów
- Gmina: Goleniów

Twarogi [tfaˈrɔɡi] (German: Schnittsoll) is a village in the administrative district of Gmina Goleniów, within Goleniów County, West Pomeranian Voivodeship, in north-western Poland.

For the history of the region, see History of Pomerania.
