= Krzewno, West Pomeranian Voivodeship =

Krzewno
- Village
- Location within Poland
- Coordinates: 53°33′15″N 14°49′47″E
- Country: Poland
- Voivodeship: West Pomeranian
- County: Goleniów
- Gmina: Goleniów
- Population: 150

Krzewno [ˈkʂɛvnɔ] (German: Lüttkenheide) is a village in the administrative district of Gmina Goleniów, within Goleniów County, West Pomeranian Voivodeship, in north-western Poland. It lies approximately 1 km (1 mi) north-east of Goleniów and 23 km (14 mi) north-east of the regional capital Szczecin.

For the history of the region, see History of Pomerania.

The village has a population of 150.
