= Pucie =

- Settlement
- Location within Poland
- Coordinates: 53°28′7″N 14°47′23″E
- Country: Poland
- Voivodeship: West Pomeranian
- County: Goleniów
- Gmina: Goleniów

Pucie [ˈput͡ɕɛ] (German: Püttkrug) is a settlement in the administrative district of Gmina Goleniów, within Goleniów County, West Pomeranian Voivodeship, in north-western Poland. It lies approximately 10 km (6 mi) south of Goleniów and 15 km (9 mi) north-east of the regional capital Szczecin.

For the history of the region, see History of Pomerania.
