= Domastryjewo =

- Village
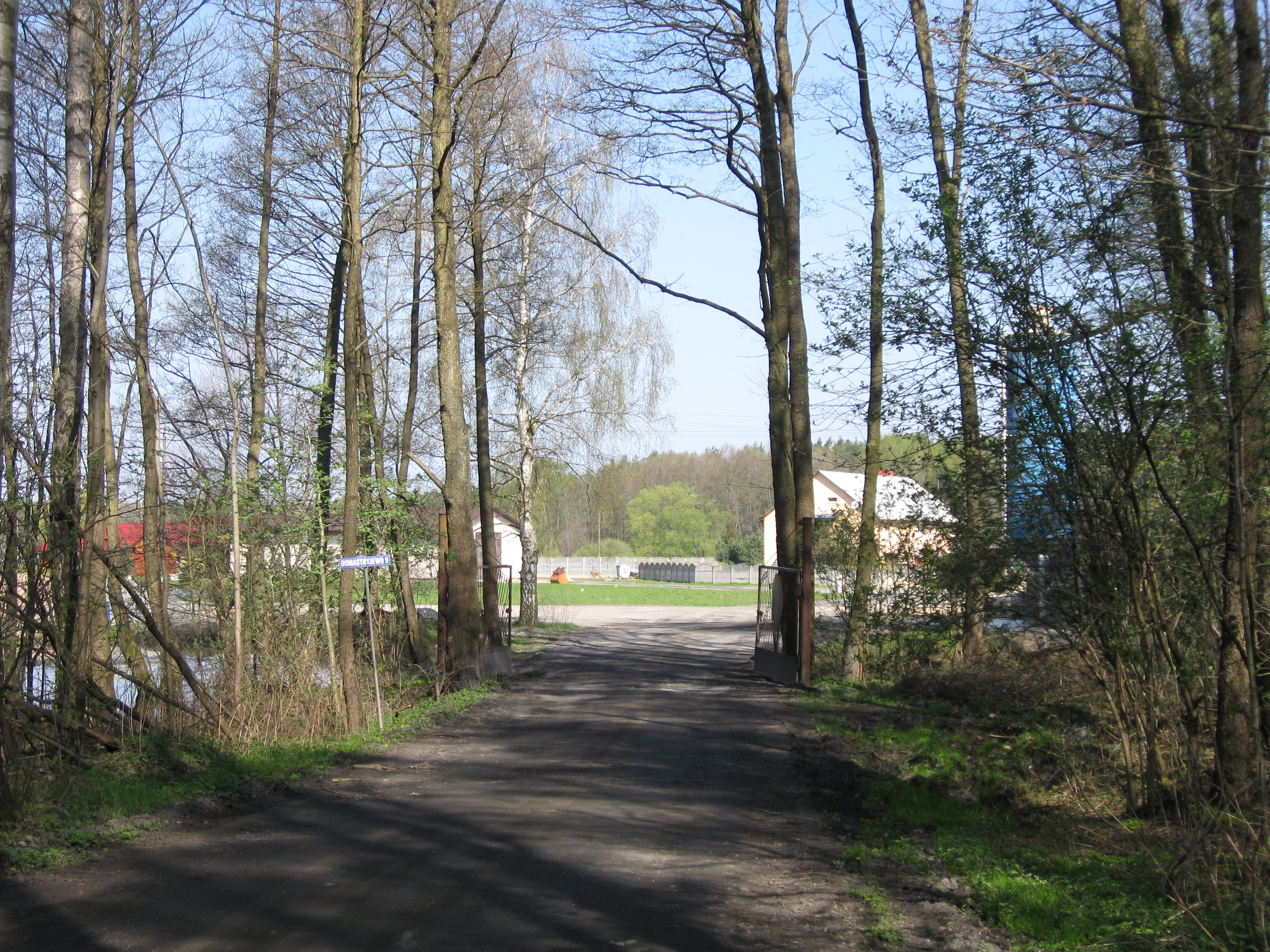
- View from the forest in Domastryjewo

- Location within Poland
- Coordinates: 53°33′48″N 14°47′37″E
- Country: Poland
- Voivodeship: West Pomeranian
- County: Goleniów
- Gmina: Goleniów

Domastryjewo [dɔmastrɨˈjɛvɔ] is a village in the administrative district of Gmina Goleniów, within Goleniów County, West Pomeranian Voivodeship, in north-western Poland.

For the history of the region, see History of Pomerania.
