= Pucice =

- Village
- Location within Poland
- Coordinates: 53°27′8″N 14°44′39″E
- Country: Poland
- Voivodeship: West Pomeranian
- County: Goleniów
- Gmina: Goleniów
- Population: 490

Pucice [puˈt͡ɕit͡sɛ] (German: Oberhof) is a village in the administrative district of Gmina Goleniów, within Goleniów County, West Pomeranian Voivodeship, in north-western Poland. It lies approximately 12 km (7 mi) south-west of Goleniów and 12 km (7 mi) east of the regional capital Szczecin.

For the history of the region, see History of Pomerania.

The village has a population of 490.
