= Zabród =

- Settlement
- Location within Poland
- Coordinates: 53°31′22″N 14°51′1″E
- Country: Poland
- Voivodeship: West Pomeranian
- County: Goleniów
- Gmina: Goleniów

Zabród [ˈzabrut] (German: Schönwerder) is a settlement in the administrative district of Gmina Goleniów, within Goleniów County, West Pomeranian Voivodeship, in north-western Poland. It lies approximately 4 km (2 mi) south-east of Goleniów and 22 km (14 mi) north-east of the regional capital Szczecin.

For the history of the region, see History of Pomerania.
