= Wierzchosław =

- Village
- Location within Poland
- Coordinates: 53°38′N 14°47′E
- Country: Poland
- Voivodeship: West Pomeranian
- County: Goleniów
- Gmina: Goleniów
- Population: 230

Wierzchosław ([vjɛʂˈxɔswaf]; formerly German: Amalienhof) is a village in the administrative district of Gmina Goleniów, within Goleniów County, West Pomeranian Voivodeship, in north-western Poland. It lies approximately 10 km (6 mi) north of Goleniów and 28 km (17 mi) north-east of the regional capital Szczecin.

For the history of the region, see History of Pomerania.

The village has a population of 230.
