= Zaborze, West Pomeranian Voivodeship =

Zaborze
- Hamlet
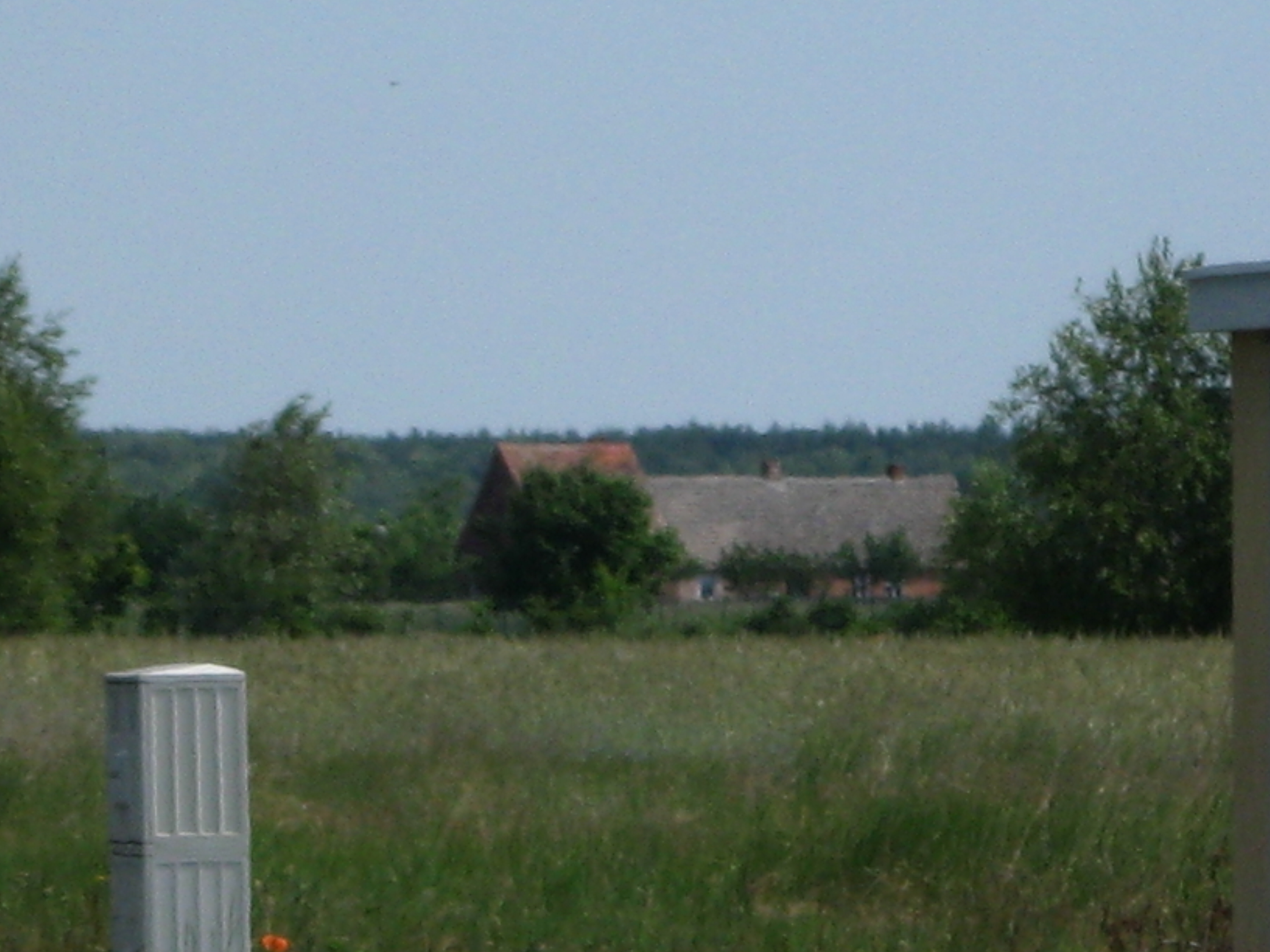

- Location within Poland
- Coordinates: 53°31′38″N 14°43′37″E
- Country: Poland
- Voivodeship: West Pomeranian
- County: Goleniów
- Gmina: Goleniów
- Elevation: 2 m (6.6 ft)

Zaborze [zabɔrzɛ] (German: Langenhorst) is a hamlet in the administrative district of Gmina Goleniów, within Goleniów County, West Pomeranian Voivodeship, in north-western Poland.
