= Tarnowiec, West Pomeranian Voivodeship =

Tarnowiec
- Village
- Location within Poland
- Coordinates: 53°29′40″N 14°54′54″E
- Country: Poland
- Voivodeship: West Pomeranian
- County: Goleniów
- Gmina: Goleniów
- Population (approx.): 60

Tarnowiec [tarˈnɔvjɛt͡s] (German: Neu Lüttkenhagen) is a village in the administrative district of Gmina Goleniów, within Goleniów County, West Pomeranian Voivodeship, in north-western Poland. It lies approximately 9 km (6 mi) south-east of Goleniów and 24 km (15 mi) east of the regional capital Szczecin.

For the history of the region, see History of Pomerania.

The village has an approximate population of 60.
