= Nadrzecze, West Pomeranian Voivodeship =

Nadrzecze
- Village
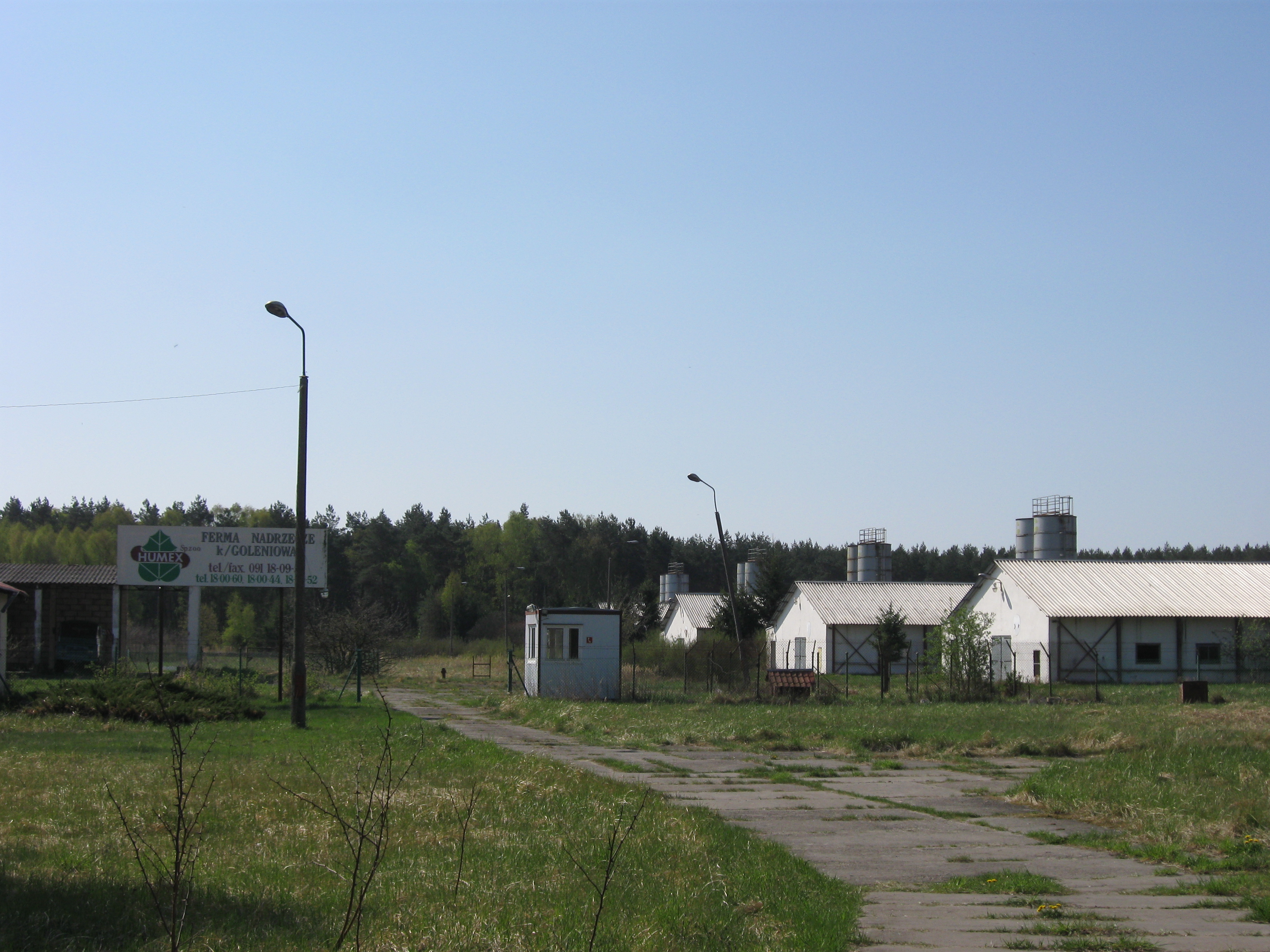
- Poultry farm in Nadrzecze

- Location within Poland
- Coordinates: 53°33′24″N 14°45′32″E
- Country: Poland
- Voivodeship: West Pomeranian
- County: Goleniów
- Gmina: Goleniów

Nadrzecze [naˈdʐɛt͡ʂɛ] (German: Höfe Vorwerk) is a village in the administrative district of Gmina Goleniów, within Goleniów County, West Pomeranian Voivodeship, in north-western Poland.

For the history of the region, see History of Pomerania.
