= Grabina, West Pomeranian Voivodeship =

Grabina
- Village
- Location within Poland
- Coordinates: 53°36′39″N 14°52′37″E
- Country: Poland
- Voivodeship: West Pomeranian
- County: Goleniów
- Gmina: Goleniów

Grabina [ɡraˈbina] is a village in the administrative district of Gmina Goleniów, within Goleniów County, West Pomeranian Voivodeship, in north-western Poland.

For the history of the region, see History of Pomerania.
