= Czarna Łąka =

- Village
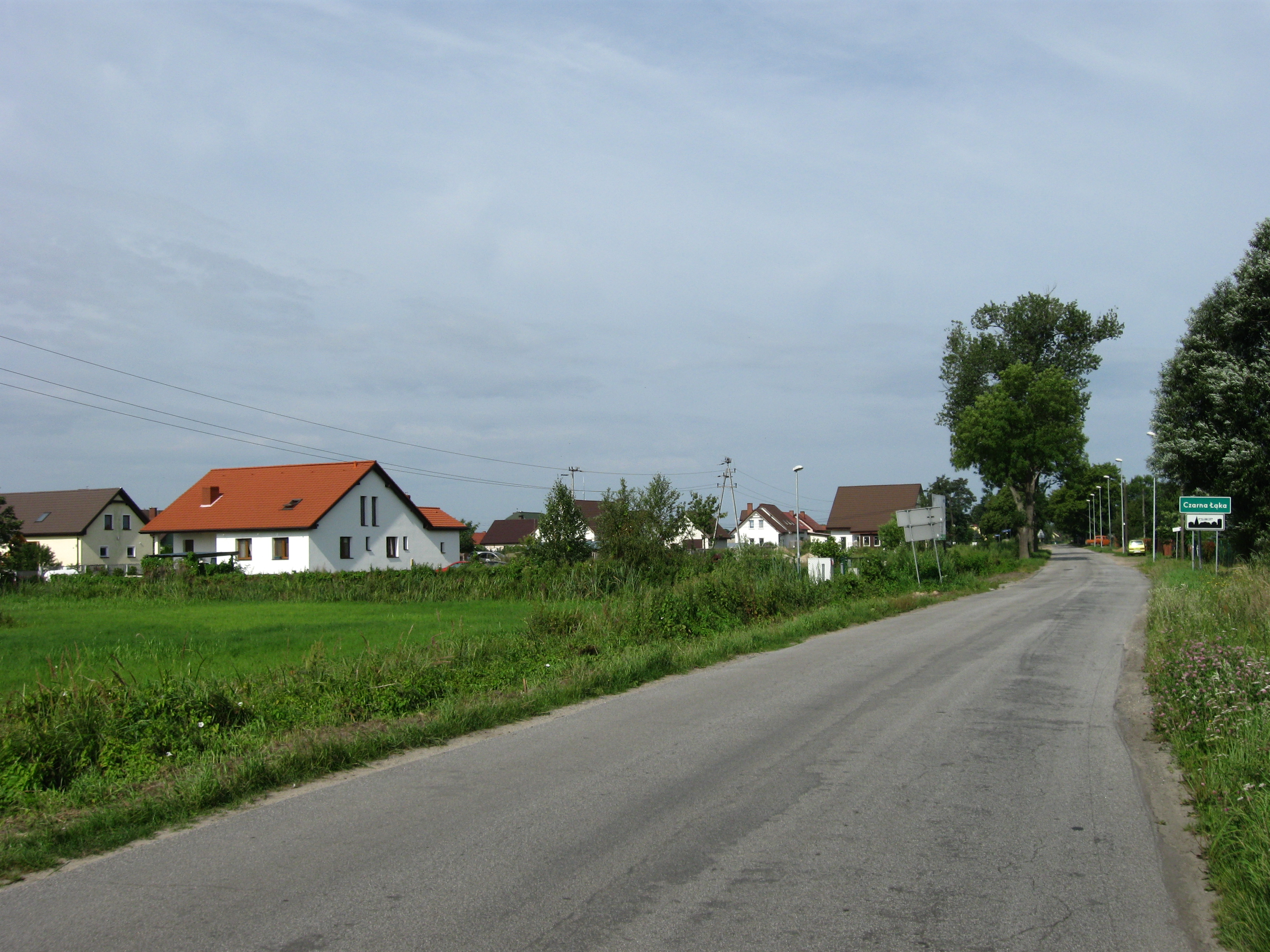
- Entrance to the village

- Location within Poland
- Coordinates: 53°27′30″N 14°43′17″E
- Country: Poland
- Voivodeship: West Pomeranian
- County: Goleniów
- Gmina: Goleniów
- Population: 350
- Time zone: UTC+1 (CET)
  - Summer (DST): UTC+2 (CEST)
- Vehicle registration: ZGL

Czarna Łąka [ˈt͡ʂarna ˈwɔnka] (German: Wilhelmsfelde) is a village in the administrative district of Gmina Goleniów, within Goleniów County, West Pomeranian Voivodeship, in north-western Poland. It lies approximately 12 km (7 mi) south-west of Goleniów and 11 km (7 mi) north-east of the regional capital Szczecin.

The village has a population of 350.

In the past the area formed part of Kingdom of Poland, the Duchy of Pomerania, the Kingdom of Prussia, and from 1871 to 1945 it was part of Germany (as Wilhelmsfelde in Prussia). When part of Nazi Germany, a forced labour subcamp of the Nazi prison in Szczecin was operated in the village. After Germany's defeat in World War II, the region became again part of Poland.
