= Łozienica =

- Village
- Location within Poland
- Coordinates: 53°32′20″N 14°47′10″E
- Country: Poland
- Voivodeship: West Pomeranian
- County: Goleniów
- Gmina: Goleniów

Łozienica [wɔʑɛˈnit͡sa] (German: Neuhof) is a village in the administrative district of Gmina Goleniów, within Goleniów County, West Pomeranian Voivodeship, in north-western Poland. It lies approximately 4 km (2 mi) west of Goleniów and 20 km (12 mi) north-east of the regional capital Szczecin.

For the history of the region, see History of Pomerania.
