= Łaniewo, West Pomeranian Voivodeship =

Łaniewo
- Village
- Location within Poland
- Coordinates: 53°35′21″N 14°45′7″E
- Country: Poland
- Voivodeship: West Pomeranian
- County: Goleniów
- Gmina: Goleniów
- Population (approx.): 60

Łaniewo [waˈɲɛvɔ] (German: Langenhals) is a village in the administrative district of Gmina Goleniów, within Goleniów County, West Pomeranian Voivodeship, in north-western Poland. It lies approximately 7 km (4 mi) north-west of Goleniów and 23 km (14 mi) north-east of the regional capital Szczecin.

For the history of the region, see History of Pomerania.

The village has an approximate population of 60.
