= Bystra, West Pomeranian Voivodeship =

Bystra
- Settlement
- Location within Poland
- Coordinates: 53°27′45″N 14°42′46″E
- Country: Poland
- Voivodeship: West Pomeranian
- County: Goleniów
- Gmina: Goleniów

Bystra [ˈbɨstra] (German: Bergland) is a settlement in the administrative district of Gmina Goleniów, within Goleniów County, West Pomeranian Voivodeship, in north-western Poland. It lies approximately 12 km (7 mi) south-west of Goleniów and 10 km (6 mi) north-east of the regional capital Szczecin.

For the history of the region, see History of Pomerania.
