= Żdżary, West Pomeranian Voivodeship =

Żdżary
- Village
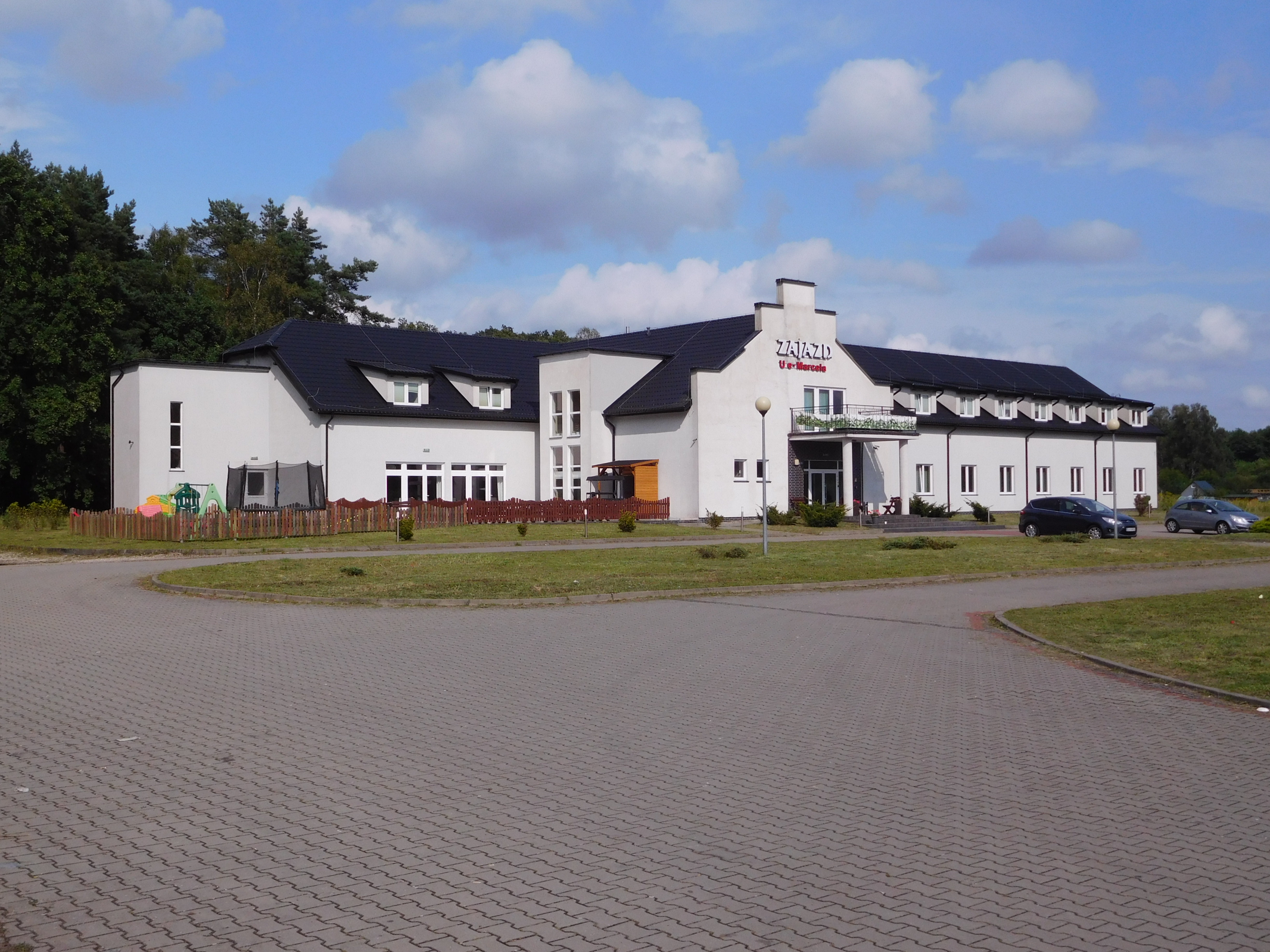
- Roadhouse U Marcela in Żdżary

- Location within Poland
- Coordinates: 53°35′3″N 14°47′41″E
- Country: Poland
- Voivodeship: West Pomeranian
- County: Goleniów
- Gmina: Goleniów
- Population (approx.): 120

Żdżary [ˈʐd͡ʐarɨ] (German: Eichberg) is a village in the administrative district of Gmina Goleniów, within Goleniów County, West Pomeranian Voivodeship, in north-western Poland. It lies approximately 5 km (3 mi) north of Goleniów and 24 km (15 mi) north-east of the regional capital Szczecin.

For the history of the region, see History of Pomerania.

The village has an approximate population of 120.
