= Smolniki, West Pomeranian Voivodeship =

Smolniki
- Settlement
- Location within Poland
- Coordinates: 53°29′46″N 14°51′17″E
- Country: Poland
- Voivodeship: West Pomeranian
- County: Goleniów
- Gmina: Goleniów

Smolniki [smɔlˈniki] is a settlement in the administrative district of Gmina Goleniów, within Goleniów County, West Pomeranian Voivodeship, in north-western Poland.

For the history of the region, see History of Pomerania.
