= Bącznik =

- Village
- Location within Poland
- Coordinates: 53°29′56″N 14°52′33″E
- Country: Poland
- Voivodeship: West Pomeranian
- County: Goleniów
- Gmina: Goleniów
- Population: 13

Bącznik [ˈbɔnt͡ʂnik] (German: Dickmühl) is a village in the administrative district of Gmina Goleniów, within Goleniów County, West Pomeranian Voivodeship, in north-western Poland. It lies approximately 7 km (4 mi) south-east of Goleniów and 22 km (14 mi) north-east of the regional capital Szczecin.

For the history of the region, see History of Pomerania.

The village has a population of 13.
