= Tarnówko, West Pomeranian Voivodeship =

Tarnówko
- Village
- Location within Poland
- Coordinates: 53°30′18″N 14°54′39″E
- Country: Poland
- Voivodeship: West Pomeranian
- County: Goleniów
- Gmina: Goleniów
- Population (approx.): 110

Tarnówko [tarˈnufkɔ] (German: Lüttkenhagen) is a village in the administrative district of Gmina Goleniów, within Goleniów County, West Pomeranian Voivodeship, in north-western Poland. It lies approximately 8 km (5 mi) south-east of Goleniów and 24 km (15 mi) north-east of the regional capital Szczecin.

For the history of the region, see History of Pomerania.

The village has an approximate population of 110.
