= Iwno, West Pomeranian Voivodeship =

Iwno
- Hamlet
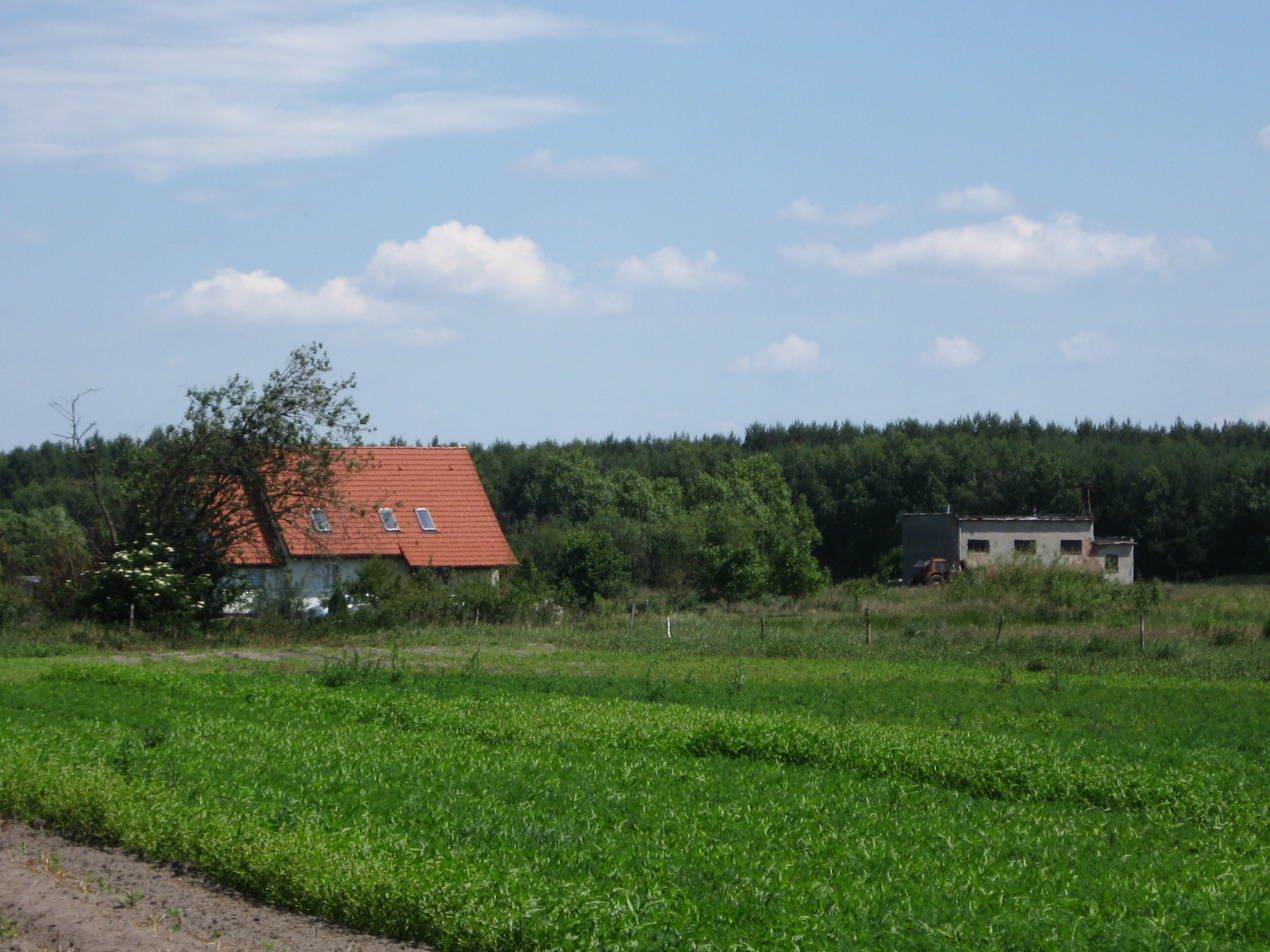

- Location within Poland
- Coordinates: 53°29′32″N 14°44′29″E
- Country: Poland
- Voivodeship: West Pomeranian
- County: Goleniów
- Gmina: Goleniów
- Elevation: 1 m (3.3 ft)

Population
  - Total: 5

Iwno [ivnɔ] (German: Ibenhorst) is a hamlet in the administrative district of Gmina Goleniów, within Goleniów County, West Pomeranian Voivodeship, in north-western Poland.

For the history of the region, see History of Pomerania.

The settlement was founded as a colony owners Lubczyny - Borgstade family in 1805.

Currently, a hamlet is located within the village Lubczyna. Iwno land lies along the road connecting the Rurzyca - Lubczyna. There are two houses, farm, and old water pump. Hamlet is surrounded by meadows and wetlands.
