= Kępy Lubczyńskie =

- Village
- Location within Poland
- Coordinates: 53°30′47″N 14°43′44″E
- Country: Poland
- Voivodeship: West Pomeranian
- County: Goleniów
- Gmina: Goleniów
- Population: 31 (2,002)

Kępy Lubczyńskie [ˈkɛmpɨ lupˈt͡ʂɨɲskʲɛ] (German: Jagenkamp) is a village in the administrative district of Gmina Goleniów, within Goleniów County, West Pomeranian Voivodeship, in north-western Poland. It lies approximately 7 km (4 mi) south-west of Goleniów and 15 km (9 mi) north-east of the regional capital Szczecin.

For the history of the region, see History of Pomerania.
