= Ininka =

- Settlement
- Location within Poland
- Coordinates: 53°33′44″N 14°45′33″E
- Country: Poland
- Voivodeship: West Pomeranian
- County: Goleniów
- Gmina: Goleniów
- Population: 31

Ininka [iˈninka] (German: Höfe) is a settlement in the administrative district of Gmina Goleniów, within Goleniów County, West Pomeranian Voivodeship, in north-western Poland. It lies approximately 4 km (2 mi) west of Goleniów and 20 km (12 mi) north-east of the regional capital Szczecin.

For the history of the region, see History of Pomerania.

The settlement has a population of 31.
