= Kliniska Małe, West Pomeranian Voivodeship =

Kliniska Małe
- Village
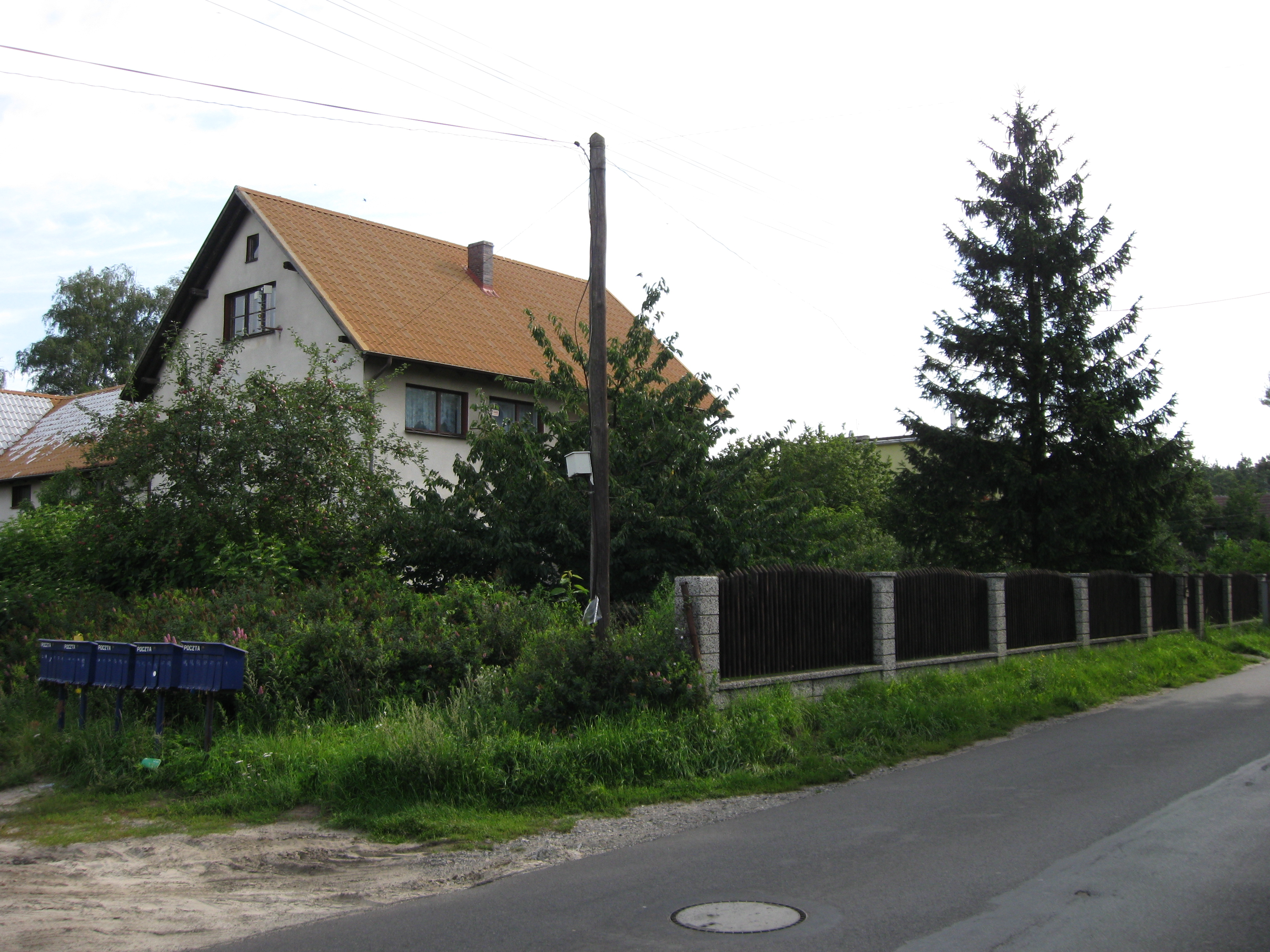
- House by the road in Kliniska

- Location within Poland
- Coordinates: 53°27′42″N 14°47′12″E
- Country: Poland
- Voivodeship: West Pomeranian
- County: Goleniów
- Gmina: Goleniów

Kliniska Małe is a village in the administrative district of Gmina Goleniów, within Goleniów County, West Pomeranian Voivodeship, in north-western Poland.

For the history of the region, see History of Pomerania.
