= Zamęcie, Gmina Goleniów =

Zamęcie
- Hamlet
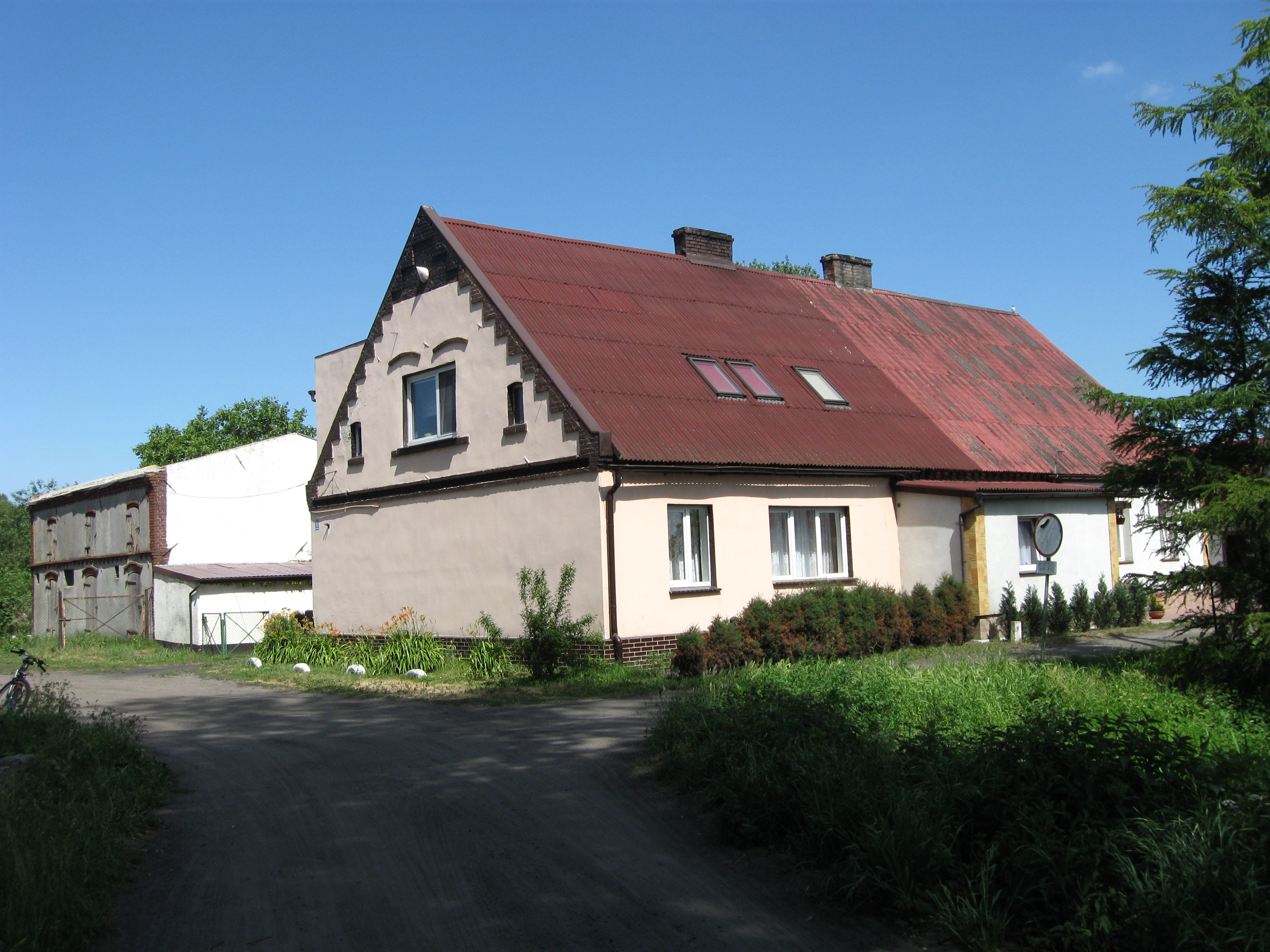

- Location within Poland
- Coordinates: 53°30′28″N 14°42′03″E
- Country: Poland
- Voivodeship: West Pomeranian
- County: Goleniów
- Gmina: Goleniów
- Elevation: 1 m (3.3 ft)

Zamęcie [zamɛ̃t͡siɛ] is a hamlet in the administrative district of Gmina Goleniów, within Goleniów County, West Pomeranian Voivodeship, in north-western Poland.

For the history of the region, see History of Pomerania.
