= Mosty-Osiedle =

- Settlement
- Location within Poland
- Coordinates: 53°34′14″N 14°56′41″E
- Country: Poland
- Voivodeship: West Pomeranian
- County: Goleniów
- Gmina: Goleniów

Mosty-Osiedle [ˈmɔstɨ ɔˈɕɛdlɛ] is a settlement in the administrative district of Gmina Goleniów, within Goleniów County, West Pomeranian Voivodeship, in north-western Poland. It lies approximately 9 km (6 mi) east of Goleniów and 30 km (19 mi) north-east of the regional capital Szczecin.

For the history of the region, see History of Pomerania.
