= Pucko, Poland =

Pucko
- Village
- Location within Poland
- Coordinates: 53°27′41″N 14°47′19″E
- Country: Poland
- Voivodeship: West Pomeranian
- County: Goleniów
- Gmina: Goleniów

Pucko [ˈput͡skɔ] (German: Pütt) is a village in the administrative district of Gmina Goleniów, within Goleniów County, West Pomeranian Voivodeship, in north-western Poland. It lies approximately 11 km (7 mi) south of Goleniów and 15 km (9 mi) east of the regional capital Szczecin.

For the history of the region, see History of Pomerania.
