= Niedamierz =

- Settlement
- Location within Poland
- Coordinates: 53°37′31″N 14°51′54″E
- Country: Poland
- Voivodeship: West Pomeranian
- County: Goleniów
- Gmina: Goleniów

Niedamierz [ɲɛˈdamjɛʂ] (German: Stiefelsberg) is a settlement in the administrative district of Gmina Goleniów, within Goleniów County, West Pomeranian Voivodeship, in north-western Poland.

For the history of the region, see History of Pomerania.
