= Budno, West Pomeranian Voivodeship =

Budno
- Village
- Location within Poland
- Coordinates: 53°32′41″N 14°54′30″E
- Country: Poland
- Voivodeship: West Pomeranian
- County: Goleniów
- Gmina: Goleniów
- Population (approx.): 190

Budno [ˈbudnɔ] (German: Buddendorf) is a village in the administrative district of Gmina Goleniów, within Goleniów County, West Pomeranian Voivodeship, in north-western Poland. It lies approximately 7 km (4 mi) east of Goleniów and 26 km (16 mi) north-east of the regional capital Szczecin.

For the history of the region, see History of Pomerania.

The village has an approximate population of 190.
