= Rurzyca, West Pomeranian Voivodeship =

Rurzyca
- Village
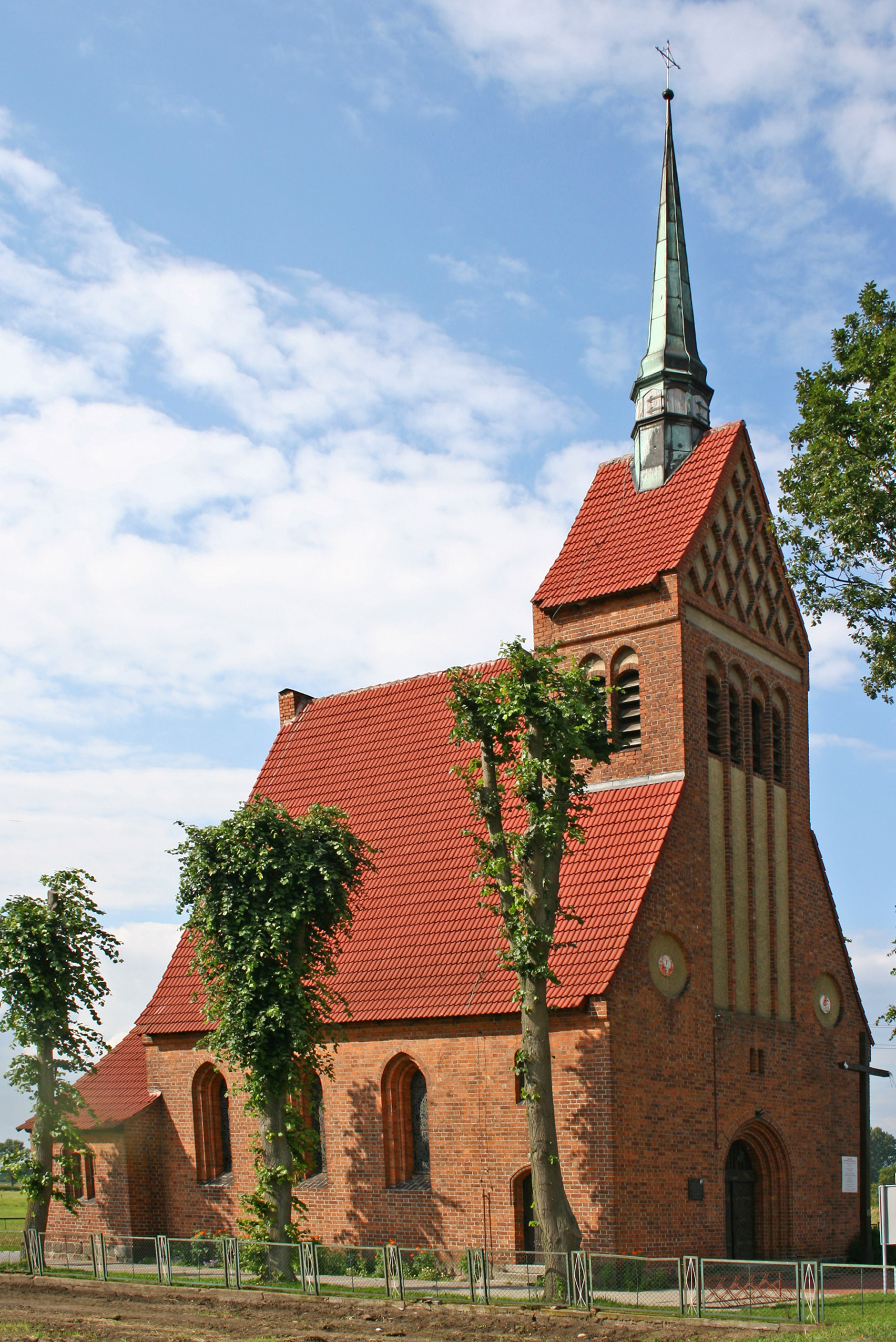
- Catholic Church of the Immaculate Conception of the Virgin Mary, formerly a German Lutheran church

- Location within Poland
- Coordinates: 53°29′4″N 14°46′39″E
- Country: Poland
- Voivodeship: West Pomeranian
- County: Goleniów
- Gmina: Goleniów

Population
  - Total: 500

Rurzyca [ruˈʐɨt͡sa] (German: Rörchen) is a village in the administrative district of Gmina Goleniów, within Goleniów County, West Pomeranian Voivodeship, in north-western Poland. It lies approximately 8 km (5 mi) south of Goleniów and 15 km (9 mi) north-east of the regional capital Szczecin.

For the history of the region, see History of Pomerania.

The village has a population of 500.
