= Krępsko, West Pomeranian Voivodeship =

Krępsko
- Village
- Location within Poland
- Coordinates: 53°35′50″N 14°44′27″E
- Country: Poland
- Voivodeship: West Pomeranian
- County: Goleniów
- Gmina: Goleniów
- Population: 350

Krępsko [ˈkrɛmpskɔ] (German: Hackenwalde) is a village in the administrative district of Gmina Goleniów, within Goleniów County, West Pomeranian Voivodeship, in north-western Poland. It lies approximately 8 km (5 mi) north-west of Goleniów and 23 km (14 mi) north-east of the regional capital Szczecin.

For the history of the region, see History of Pomerania.

The village has a population of 350.
