= Recław =

- Village
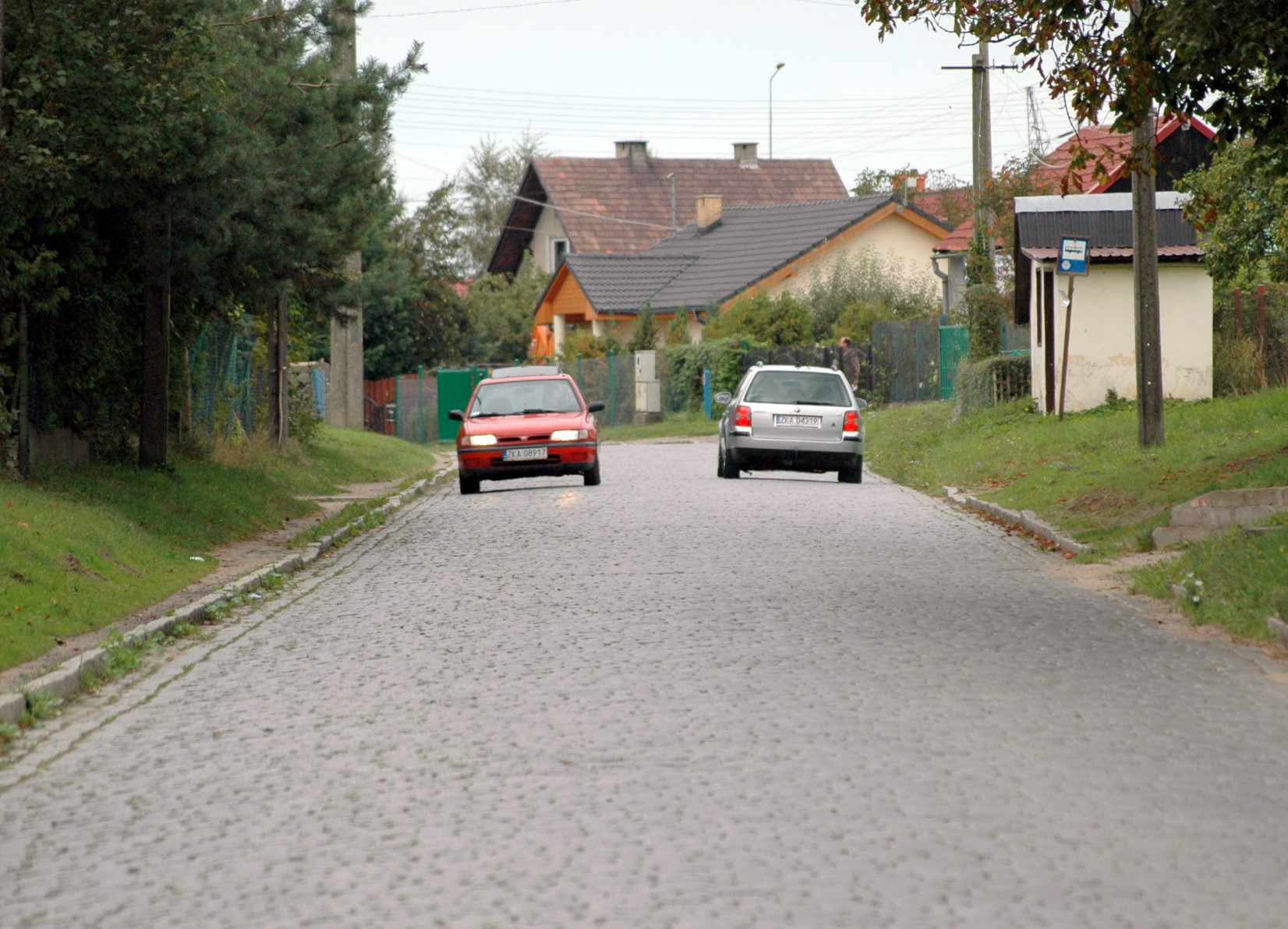
- The voivodeship road 111 in Recław, in 2009.

- Location within Poland
- Coordinates: 53°50′32″N 14°37′37″E
- Country: Poland
- Voivodeship: West Pomeranian
- County: Kamień
- Gmina: Wolin
- Population (2001): 409
- Time zone: UTC+1 (CET)
  - Summer (DST): UTC+2 (CEST)
- Postal code: 72-510
- Area code: +48 91
- Vehicle registration: ZKA

Recław (Polish: [ˈrɛt͡s.waf]; German until 1945: Hagen [ˈhaːɡən]) is a village in the West Pomeranian Voivodeship, Poland, located within Gmina Wolin, Kamień County. In 2001, it had a population of 409 people.

== History ==
Recław was originally a tribal settlement of Wolinians. The earliest known mention of the settlement in the documentation comes from 1291, then noted as Wenkenhagen. At the time, it was a property of the Order of Cistercians.

In 1892, in the village was opened the Recław railway station.

In 1945, in the aftermath of World War II, the area that included the settlement was incorporated from Germany to Poland, with original German population being displaced, and replaced by Polish population. As such, the settlement was renamed from Hagen, to Recław.

From 1945 to 1954, it was a seat of government of the Gmina Recław, one of gminas (municipalities) of the Kamień County.

== Transportation ==
In the settlement is located the Recław railway station, located on the railway line 401, between stations of Szczecin Dąbie and Świnoujście Port.

Though Recław also goes the voivodeship road 111.
