= Dargobądz =

- Village
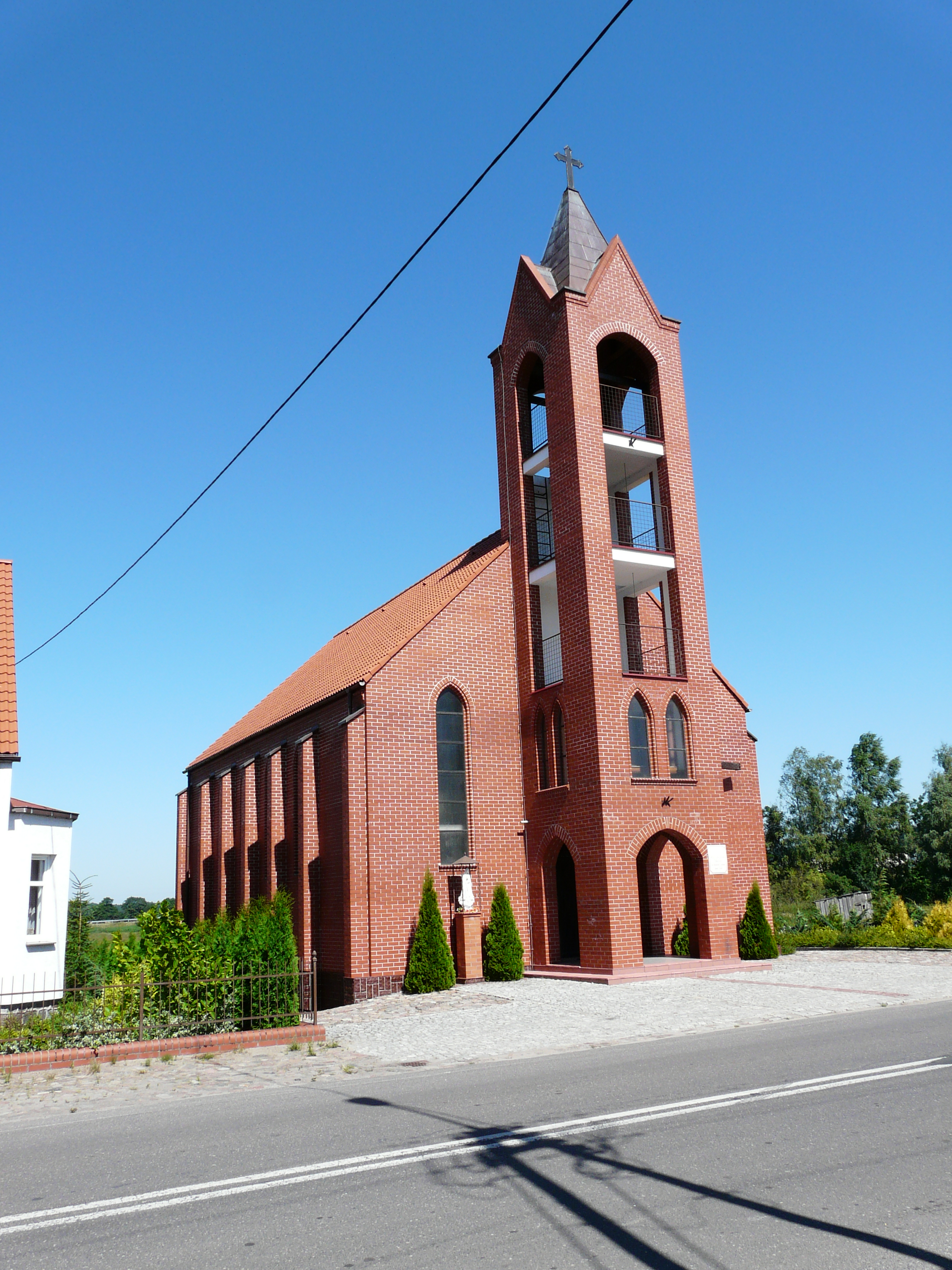
- Church

- Location within Poland
- Coordinates: 53°52′21″N 14°32′4″E
- Country: Poland
- Voivodeship: West Pomeranian
- County: Kamień
- Gmina: Wolin
- Population: 380
- Website: http://dargobadz.tnb.pl/news.php

Dargobądz [darˈɡɔbɔnt͡s] is a village in the administrative district of Gmina Wolin, within Kamień County, West Pomeranian Voivodeship, in north-western Poland. It lies approximately 7 km (4 mi) north-west of Wolin, 20 km (12 mi) south-west of Kamień Pomorski, and 51 km (32 mi) north of the regional capital Szczecin.
