= Kąty, West Pomeranian Voivodeship =

Kąty
- Village
- Location within Poland
- Coordinates: 53°37′19″N 14°44′22″E
- Country: Poland
- Voivodeship: West Pomeranian
- County: Goleniów
- Gmina: Goleniów
- Population: 200

Kąty [ˈkɔntɨ] (formerly German: Kattenhof) is a village in the administrative district of Gmina Goleniów, within Goleniów County, West Pomeranian Voivodeship, in north-western Poland. It lies approximately 10 km (6 mi) north-west of Goleniów and 26 km (16 mi) north-east of the regional capital Szczecin.

For the history of the region, see History of Pomerania.

The village has a population of 200.
