= Glewice =

- Village
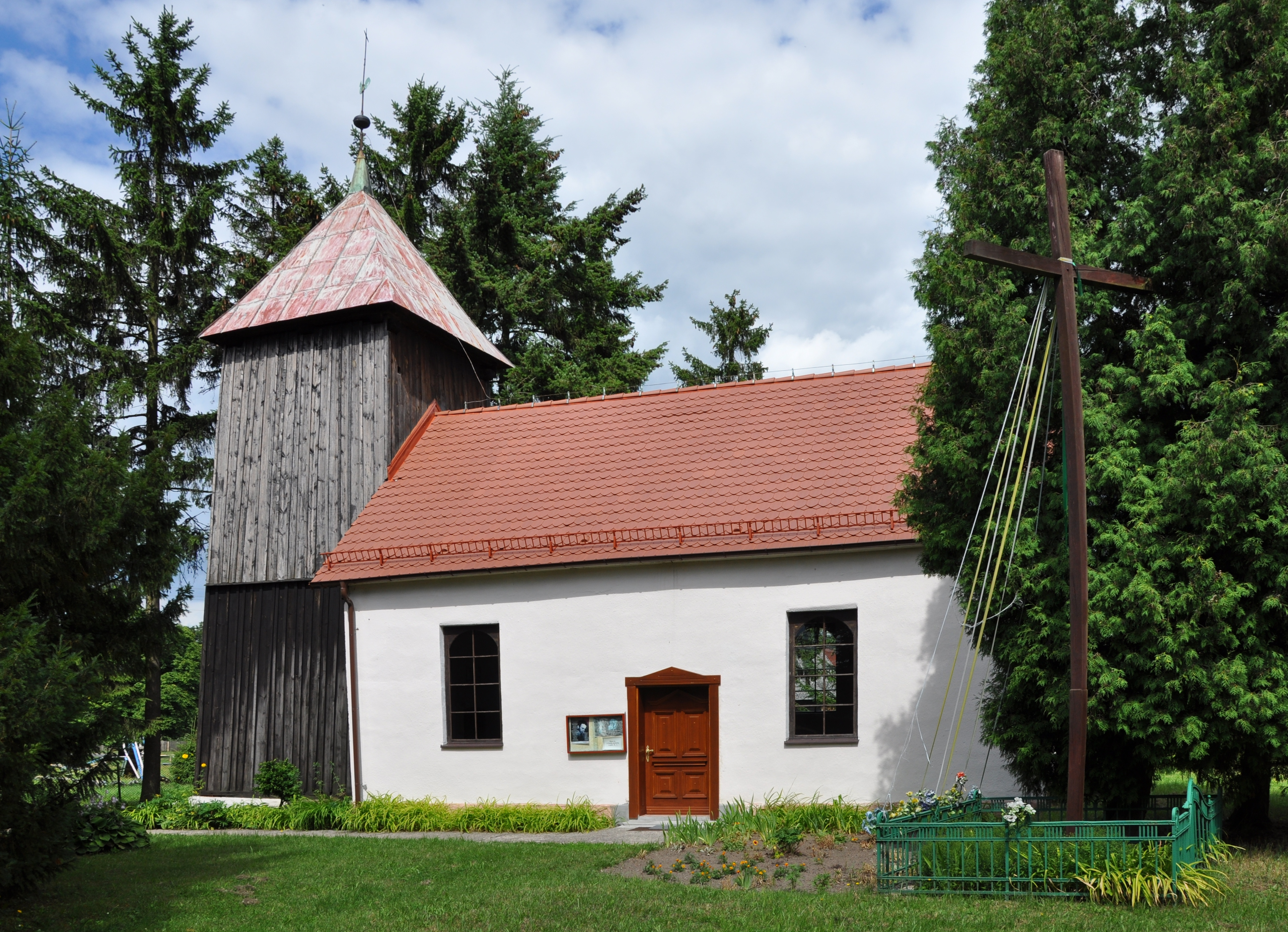
- Saint Stanislaus church in Glewice

- Location within Poland
- Coordinates: 53°36′N 14°55′E
- Country: Poland
- Voivodeship: West Pomeranian
- County: Goleniów
- Gmina: Goleniów
- Population: 130
- Time zone: UTC+1 (CET)
  - Summer (DST): UTC+2 (CEST)
- Vehicle registration: ZGL
- Primary airport: Solidarity Szczecin–Goleniów Airport

Glewice [ɡlɛˈvit͡sɛ] (German: Glewitz) is a village in the administrative district of Gmina Goleniów, within Goleniów County, West Pomeranian Voivodeship, in north-western Poland. It lies approximately 9 km (6 mi) north-east of Goleniów and 31 km (19 mi) north-east of the regional capital Szczecin. It is located in the historic region of Pomerania.

The village has a population of 130.

== Transport ==
The Solidarity Szczecin–Goleniów Airport, the main international airport of north-western Poland, is located in Glewice, and the S6 highway runs through the village.
