= Żółwia =

- Village
- Location within Poland
- Coordinates: 53°33′22″N 14°51′58″E
- Country: Poland
- Voivodeship: West Pomeranian
- County: Goleniów
- Gmina: Goleniów

Żółwia [ˈʐuu̯vja] (German: Gollnow-Papiermühle) is a village in the administrative district of Gmina Goleniów, within Goleniów County, West Pomeranian Voivodeship, in north-western Poland.

For the history of the region, see History of Pomerania.
