= Niedoradz =

- Village
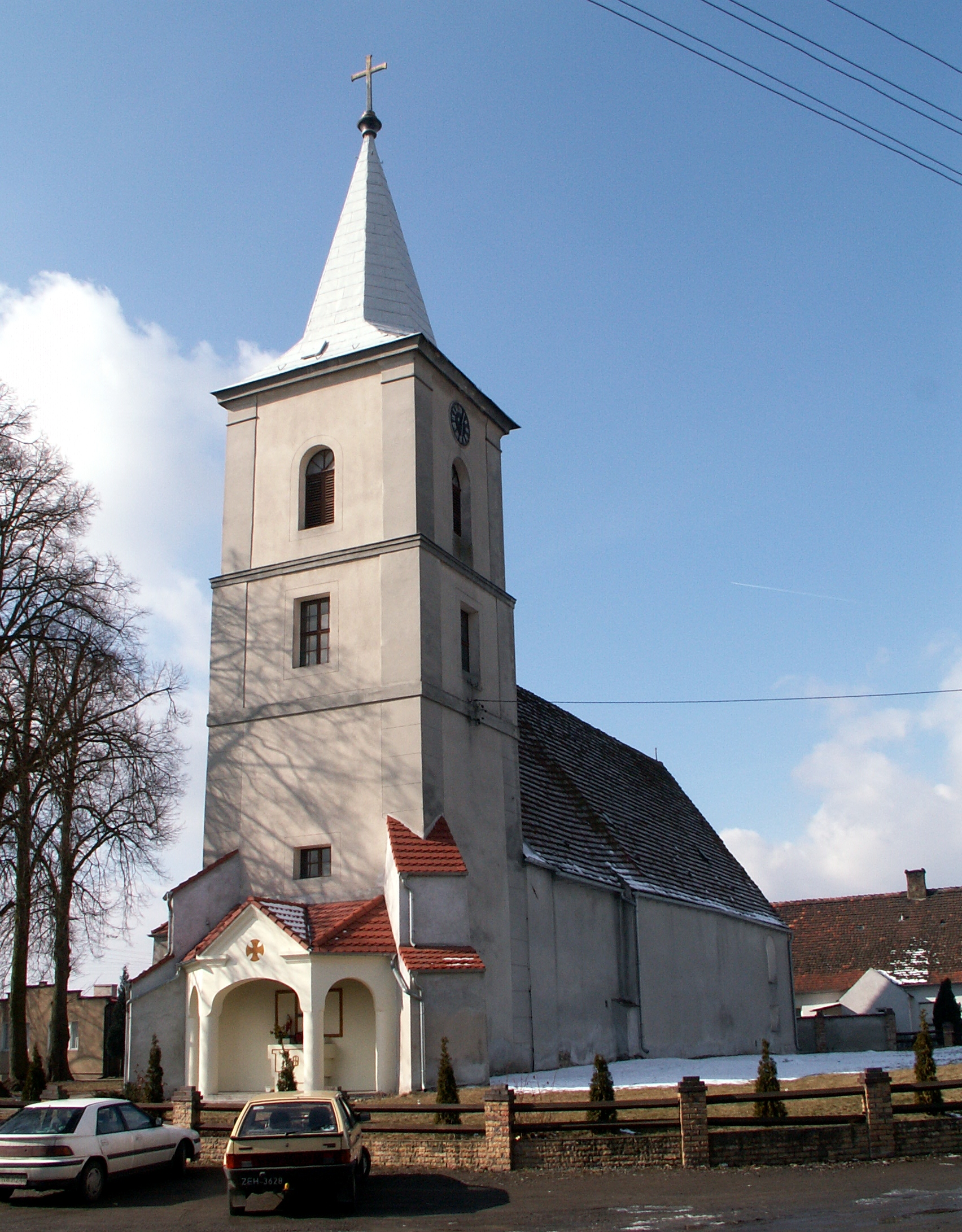
- Catholic church

- Location within Poland
- Coordinates: 51°52′N 15°40′E
- Country: Poland
- Voivodeship: Lubusz
- County: Nowa Sól
- Gmina: Otyń

Niedoradz [ɲɛˈdɔrat͡s] is a village in the administrative district of Gmina Otyń, within Nowa Sól County, Lubusz Voivodeship, in western Poland.
