= Bolesławice, West Pomeranian Voivodeship =

Bolesławice
- Village
- Location within Poland
- Coordinates: 53°33′53″N 14°40′46″E
- Country: Poland
- Voivodeship: West Pomeranian
- County: Goleniów
- Gmina: Goleniów

Bolesławice [bɔlɛswaˈvit͡sɛ] (German: Fürstenflagge) is a village in the administrative district of Gmina Goleniów, within Goleniów County, West Pomeranian Voivodeship, in north-western Poland. It lies approximately 10 km (6 mi) west of Goleniów and 18 km (11 mi) north of the regional capital Szczecin. For the history of the region, see History of Pomerania.
