= Komarowo =

- Village
- Location within Poland
- Coordinates: 53°32′6″N 14°44′38″E
- Country: Poland
- Voivodeship: West Pomeranian
- County: Goleniów
- Gmina: Goleniów
- Population: 640

Komarowo [kɔmaˈrɔvɔ] (German: Karlshof) is a village in the administrative district of Gmina Goleniów, within Goleniów County, West Pomeranian Voivodeship, in north-western Poland. It lies approximately 6 km (4 mi) west of Goleniów and 17 km (11 mi) north-east of the regional capital Szczecin.

For the history of the region, see History of Pomerania.

The village has a population of 640.
