= Imno, Goleniów County =

Imno
- Village
- Location within Poland
- Coordinates: 53°33′20″N 14°56′0″E
- Country: Poland
- Voivodeship: West Pomeranian
- County: Goleniów
- Gmina: Goleniów
- Population (approx.): 60

Imno [ˈimnɔ] (German: Immenthal) is a village in the administrative district of Gmina Goleniów, within Goleniów County, West Pomeranian Voivodeship, in north-western Poland. It lies approximately 8 km (5 mi) east of Goleniów and 28 km (17 mi) north-east of the regional capital Szczecin.

For the history of the region, see History of Pomerania.

The village has an approximate population of 60.
