= Burowo =

- Village
- Location within Poland
- Coordinates: 53°33′48″N 14°58′32″E
- Country: Poland
- Voivodeship: West Pomeranian
- County: Goleniów
- Gmina: Goleniów
- Population: 120

Burowo [buˈrɔvɔ] (German: Burow) is a village in the administrative district of Gmina Goleniów, within Goleniów County, West Pomeranian Voivodeship, in north-western Poland. It lies approximately 11 km (7 mi) east of Goleniów and 31 km (19 mi) north-east of the regional capital Szczecin.

For the history of the region, see History of Pomerania.

The village has a population of 120.
