= Łęsko =

- Village
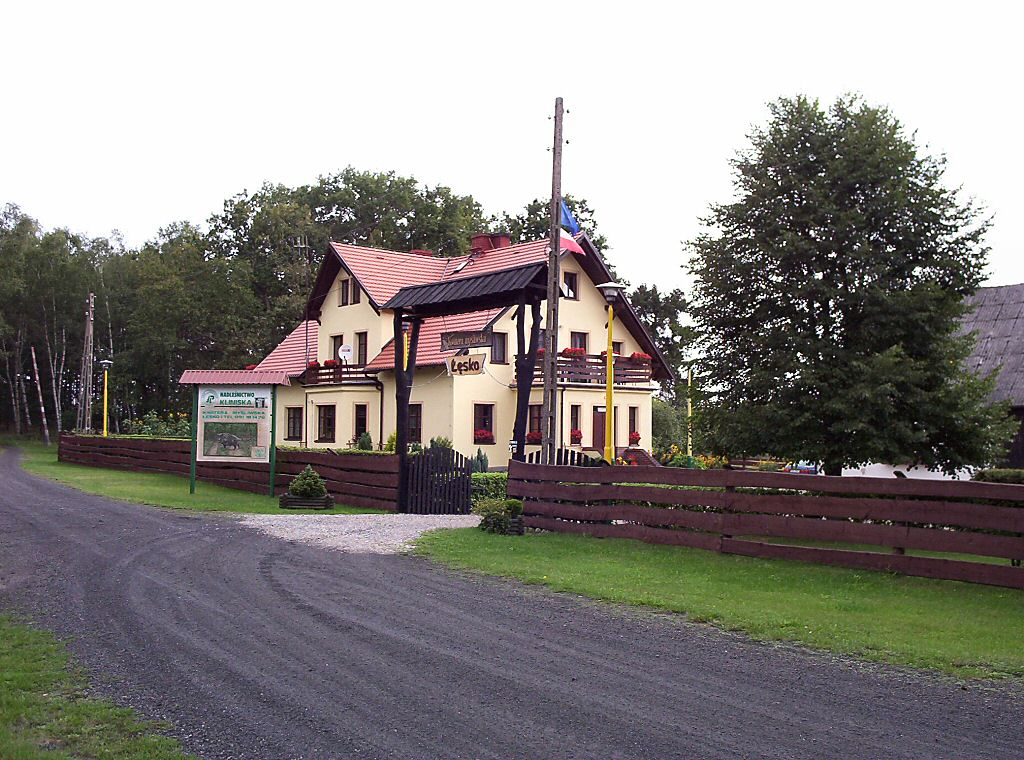

- Location within Poland
- Coordinates: 53°29′21″N 14°51′53″E
- Country: Poland
- Voivodeship: West Pomeranian
- County: Goleniów
- Gmina: Goleniów
- Population: 4

Łęsko [ˈwɛ̃skɔ] (German: Unter Karlsbach) is a village in the administrative district of Gmina Goleniów, within Goleniów County, West Pomeranian Voivodeship, in north-western Poland.

For the history of the region, see History of Pomerania.

The village has a population of 4.
