= Białuń, Goleniów County =

Białuń
- Village
- Location within Poland
- Coordinates: 53°36′40″N 14°51′2″E
- Country: Poland
- Voivodeship: West Pomeranian
- County: Goleniów
- Gmina: Goleniów
- Elevation: 27 m (89 ft)
- Population: 340

Białuń [ˈbjawuɲ] (formerly German: Gollnowshagen) is a village in the administrative district of Gmina Goleniów, within Goleniów County, West Pomeranian Voivodeship, in north-western Poland. It lies approximately 8 km (5 mi) north of Goleniów and 28 km (17 mi) north-east of the regional capital Szczecin.

The village has a population of 340.

For the history of the region, see History of Pomerania.
