= Rurka, Goleniów County =

Rurka
- Settlement
- Location within Poland
- Coordinates: 53°29′30″N 14°47′38″E
- Country: Poland
- Voivodeship: West Pomeranian
- County: Goleniów
- Gmina: Goleniów
- Population: 22

Rurka [ˈrurka] (German: Rörchen) is a settlement in the administrative district of Gmina Goleniów, within Goleniów County, West Pomeranian Voivodeship, in north-western Poland. It lies approximately 8 km (5 mi) south of Goleniów and 17 km (11 mi) north-east of the regional capital Szczecin.

For the history of the region, see History of Pomerania.

The settlement has a population of 22.
