= Dobroszyn, Gmina Goleniów =

Dobroszyn
- Village
- Location within Poland
- Coordinates: 53°29′39″N 14°46′37″E
- Country: Poland
- Voivodeship: West Pomeranian
- County: Goleniów
- Gmina: Goleniów

Dobroszyn [dɔˈbrɔʂɨn] (German: Klein Sophienthal) is a village in the administrative district of Gmina Goleniów, within Goleniów County, West Pomeranian Voivodeship, in north-western Poland. It lies approximately 7 km (4 mi) south-west of Goleniów and 16 km (10 mi) north-east of the regional capital Szczecin.

== See also ==
- History of Pomerania
