= Marszewo, Goleniów County =

Marszewo
- Village
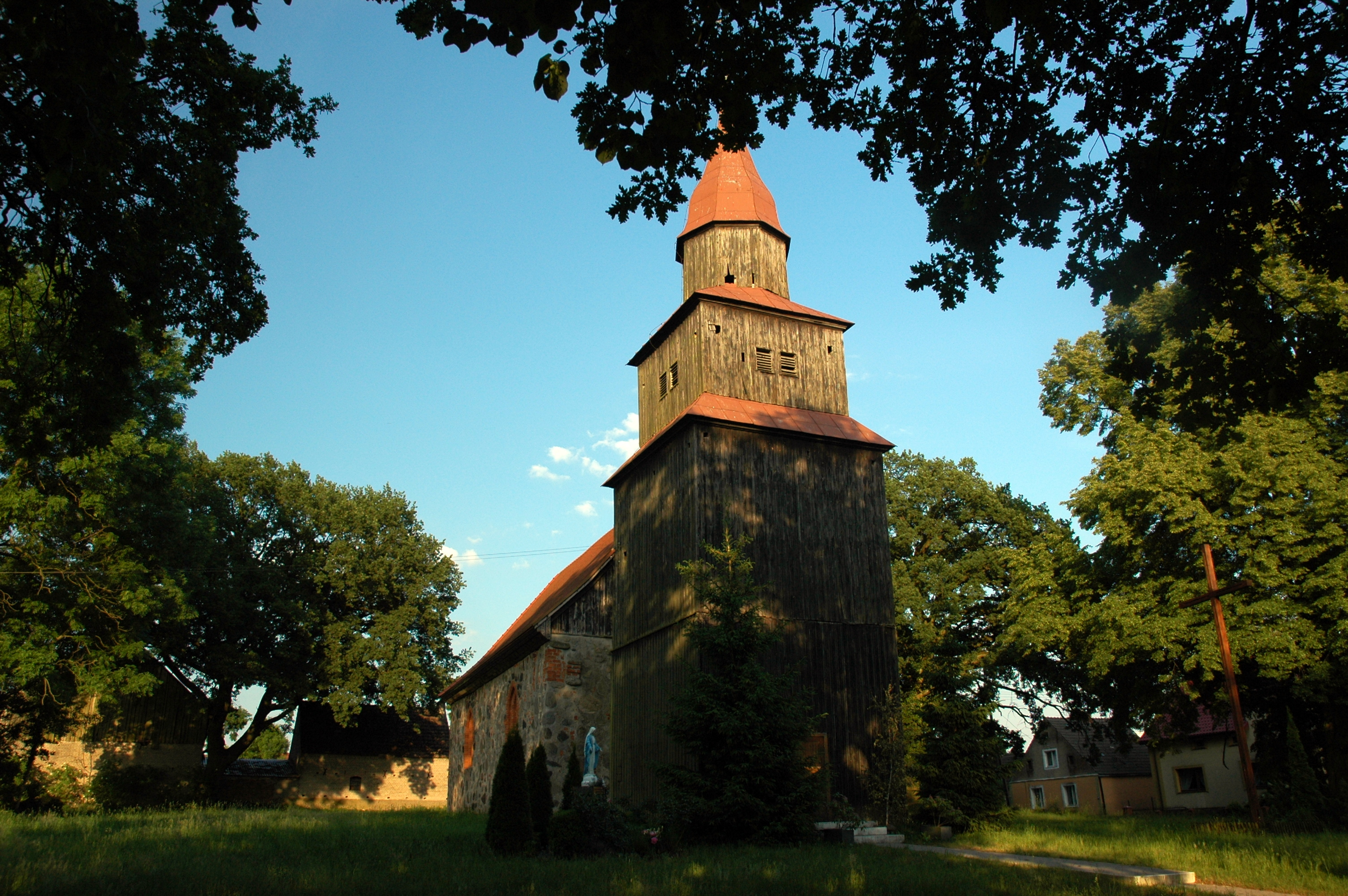
- Church of the Ascension of Christ

- Location within Poland
- Coordinates: 53°34′15″N 14°53′29″E
- Country: Poland
- Voivodeship: West Pomeranian
- County: Goleniów
- Gmina: Goleniów

Population (approx.)
  - Total: 200
- Time zone: UTC+1 (CET)
  - Summer (DST): UTC+2 (CEST)
- Vehicle registration: ZGL
- Primary airport: Solidarity Szczecin–Goleniów Airport

Marszewo [marˈʂɛvɔ] (German: Marsdorf) is a village in the administrative district of Gmina Goleniów, within Goleniów County, West Pomeranian Voivodeship, in north-western Poland. It lies approximately 6 km (4 mi) north-east of Goleniów and 27 km (17 mi) north-east of the regional capital Szczecin. It is located in the historic region of Pomerania.

The village has an approximate population of 200.
