= Danowo, West Pomeranian Voivodeship =

Danowo
- Village
- Location within Poland
- Coordinates: 53°31′26″N 14°56′30″E
- Country: Poland
- Voivodeship: West Pomeranian
- County: Goleniów
- Gmina: Goleniów
- Population: 250

Danowo [daˈnɔvɔ] (German: Jakobsdorf) is a village in the administrative district of Gmina Goleniów, within Goleniów County, West Pomeranian Voivodeship, in north-western Poland. It lies approximately 9 km (6 mi) east of Goleniów and 27 km (17 mi) north-east of the regional capital Szczecin.

For the history of the region, see History of Pomerania.

The village has a population of 250.
