= Żółwia Błoć =

- Village
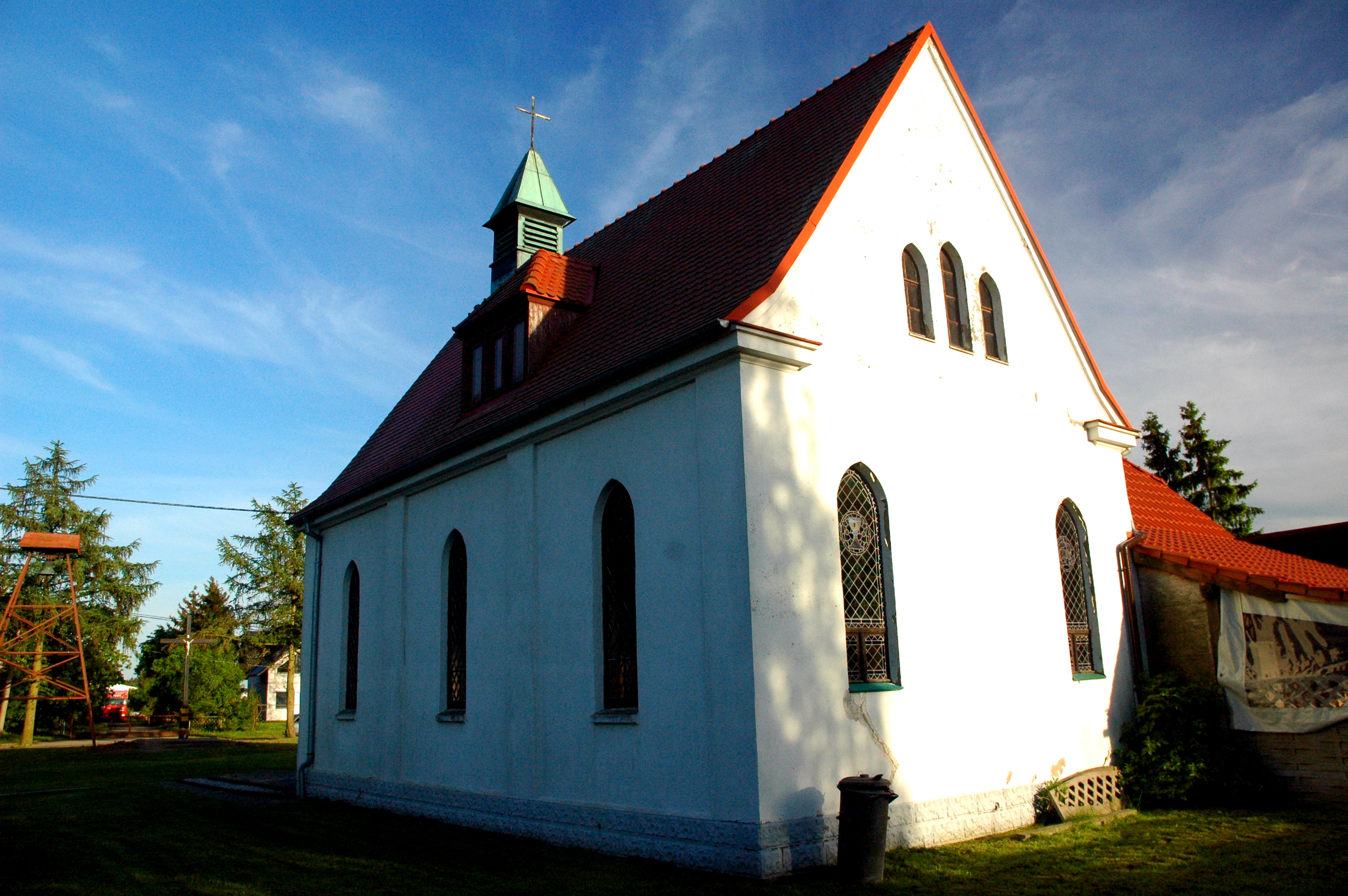
- Saint Anthony church in Żółwia Błoć

- Location within Poland
- Coordinates: 53°35′48″N 14°51′43″E
- Country: Poland
- Voivodeship: West Pomeranian
- County: Goleniów
- Gmina: Goleniów

Żółwia Błoć [ˈʐuu̯vja ˈbwɔt͡ɕ] (formerly German: Barfußdorf) is a village in the administrative district of Gmina Goleniów, within Goleniów County, West Pomeranian Voivodeship, in north-western Poland. It lies approximately 6 km (4 mi) north-east of Goleniów and 28 km (17 mi) north-east of the regional capital Szczecin.

During World War II, the German Nazi government operated a forced labour subcamp of the Stalag II-D prisoner-of-war camp in the village.
