= Stawno, Goleniów County =

Stawno
- Village
- Location within Poland
- Coordinates: 53°29′47″N 14°53′55″E
- Country: Poland
- Voivodeship: West Pomeranian
- County: Goleniów
- Gmina: Goleniów
- Population (approx.): 110

Stawno [ˈstavnɔ] is a village in the administrative district of Gmina Goleniów, within Goleniów County, West Pomeranian Voivodeship, in north-western Poland. It lies approximately 9 km (6 mi) south-east of Goleniów and 23 km (14 mi) north-east of the regional capital Szczecin.

== See also ==
- History of Pomerania
