= Miękowo, Goleniów County =

Miękowo
- Village
- Location within Poland
- Coordinates: 53°36′55″N 14°49′21″E
- Country: Poland
- Voivodeship: West Pomeranian
- County: Goleniów
- Gmina: Goleniów

Miękowo [mjɛnˈkɔvɔ] is a village in the administrative district of Gmina Goleniów, within Goleniów County, West Pomeranian Voivodeship, in north-western Poland. It lies approximately 8 km (5 mi) north of Goleniów and 28 km (17 mi) north-east of the regional capital Szczecin.

For the history of the region, see History of Pomerania.
