= Kliniska Wielkie =

- Village
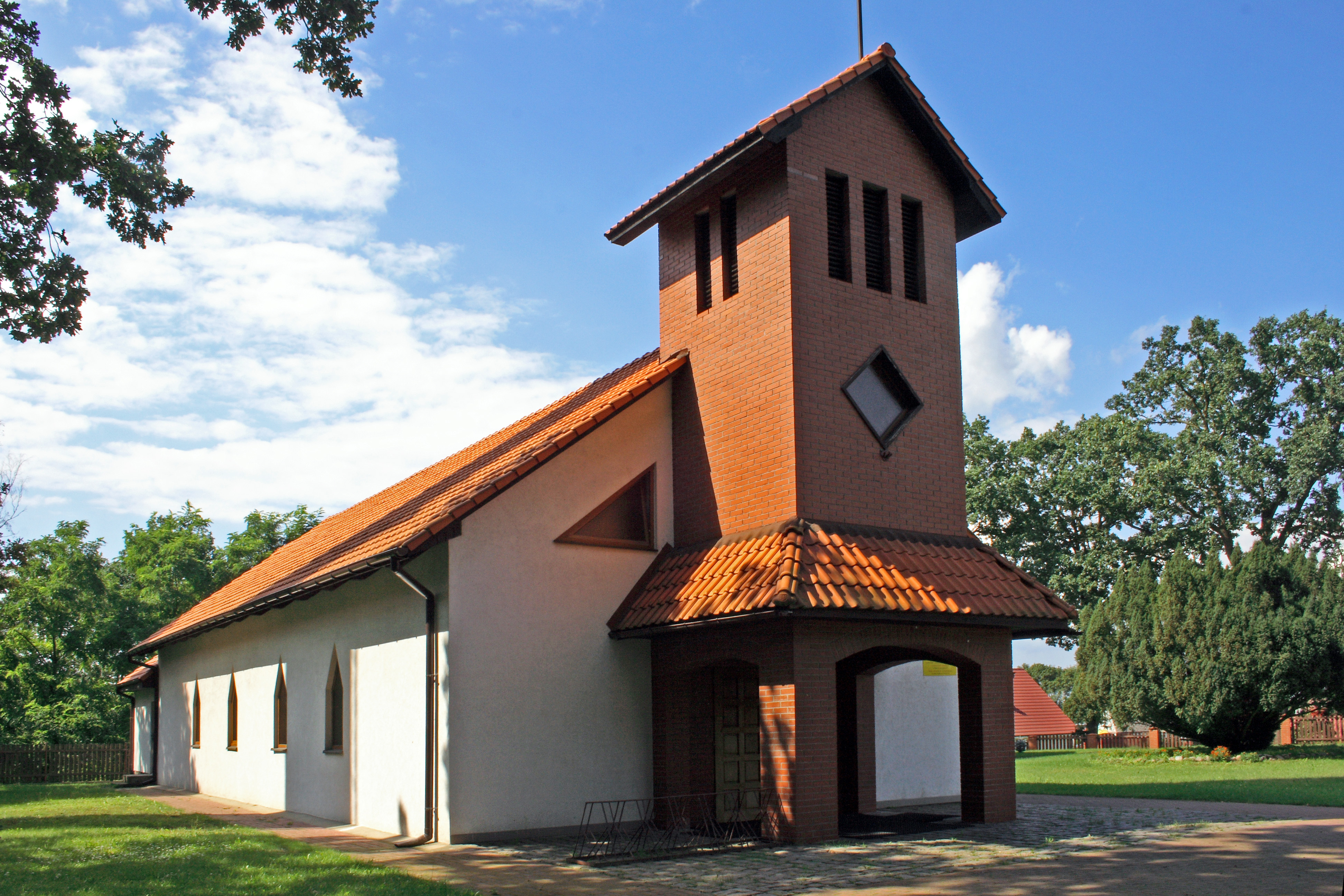
- Church of Blessed Michał Kozal

- Location within Poland
- Coordinates: 53°27′42″N 14°46′24″E
- Country: Poland
- Voivodeship: West Pomeranian
- County: Goleniów
- Gmina: Goleniów

Kliniska Wielkie [kliˈniska ˈvjɛlkʲɛ] (German: Groß Christinenberg) is a village in the administrative district of Gmina Goleniów, within Goleniów County, West Pomeranian Voivodeship, in north-western Poland. It lies approximately 11 km (7 mi) south of Goleniów and 14 km (9 mi) east of the regional capital Szczecin.

For the history of the region, see History of Pomerania.
