= Modrzewie, West Pomeranian Voivodeship =

Modrzewie
- Village
- Location within Poland
- Coordinates: 53°34′44″N 14°44′28″E
- Country: Poland
- Voivodeship: West Pomeranian
- County: Goleniów
- Gmina: Goleniów
- Population: 130

Modrzewie (Polish: [mɔdˈʐɛvjɛ]; German: Grünhorst) is a village in the administrative district of Gmina Goleniów, within Goleniów County, West Pomeranian Voivodeship, in north-western Poland. It lies approximately 6 km (4 mi) north-west of Goleniów and 21 km (13 mi) north-east of the regional capital Szczecin.

For the history of the region, see History of Pomerania.

The village has a population of 130.
