= Bolechowo, West Pomeranian Voivodeship =

Bolechowo
- Village
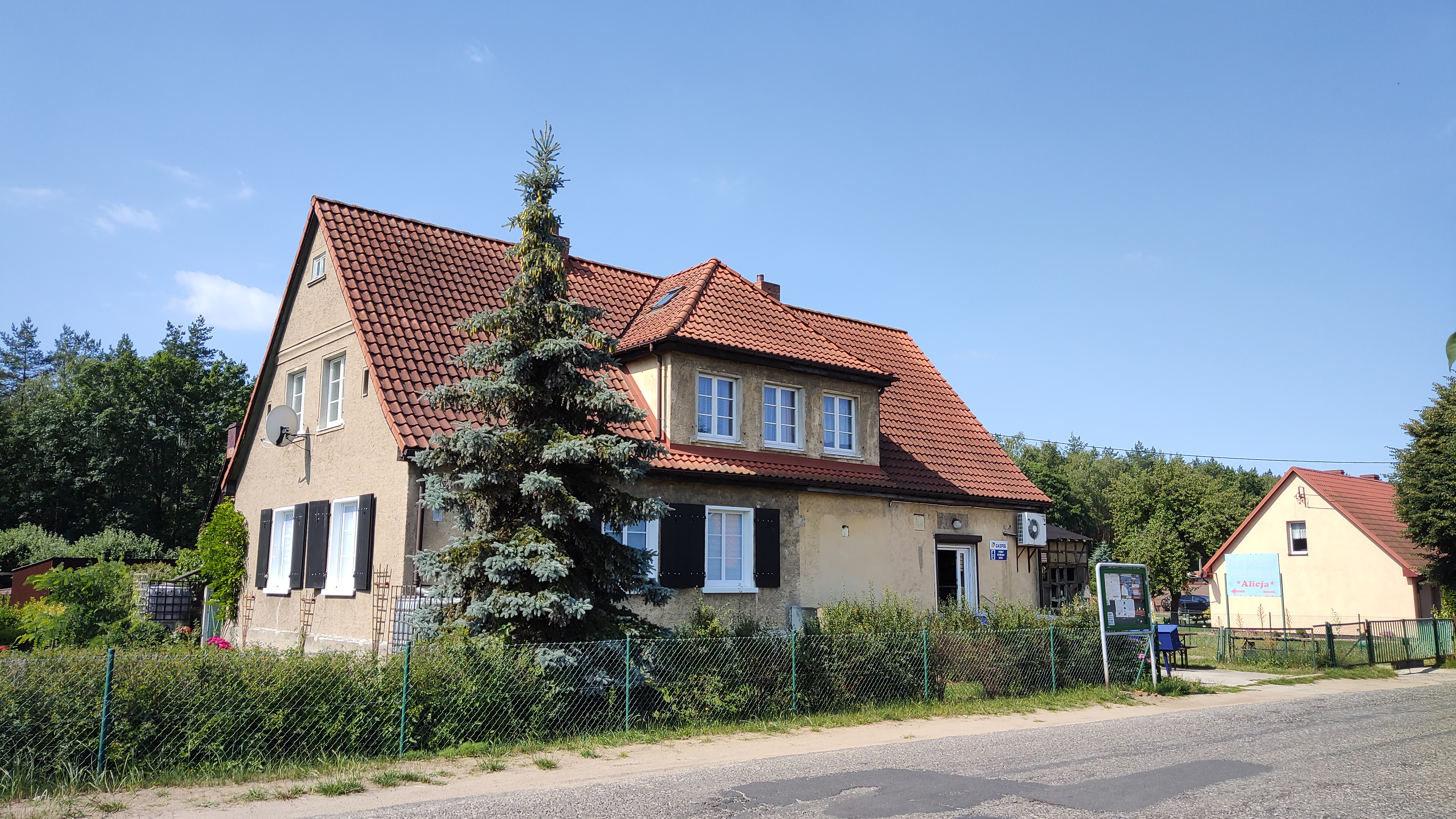

- Location within Poland
- Coordinates: 53°30′20″N 14°52′20″E
- Country: Poland
- Voivodeship: West Pomeranian
- County: Goleniów
- Gmina: Goleniów

Population
  - Total: 180
- Time zone: UTC+1 (CET)
  - Summer (DST): UTC+2 (CEST)
- Vehicle registration: ZGL

Bolechowo [bɔlɛˈxɔvɔ] (German: Diedrichsdorf) is a village in the administrative district of Gmina Goleniów, within Goleniów County, West Pomeranian Voivodeship, in north-western Poland. It lies approximately 7 km (4 mi) south-east of Goleniów and 22 km (14 mi) north-east of the regional capital Szczecin.

For the history of the region, see History of Pomerania.

The village has a population of 180.
