= Mosty, West Pomeranian Voivodeship =

Mosty
- Village
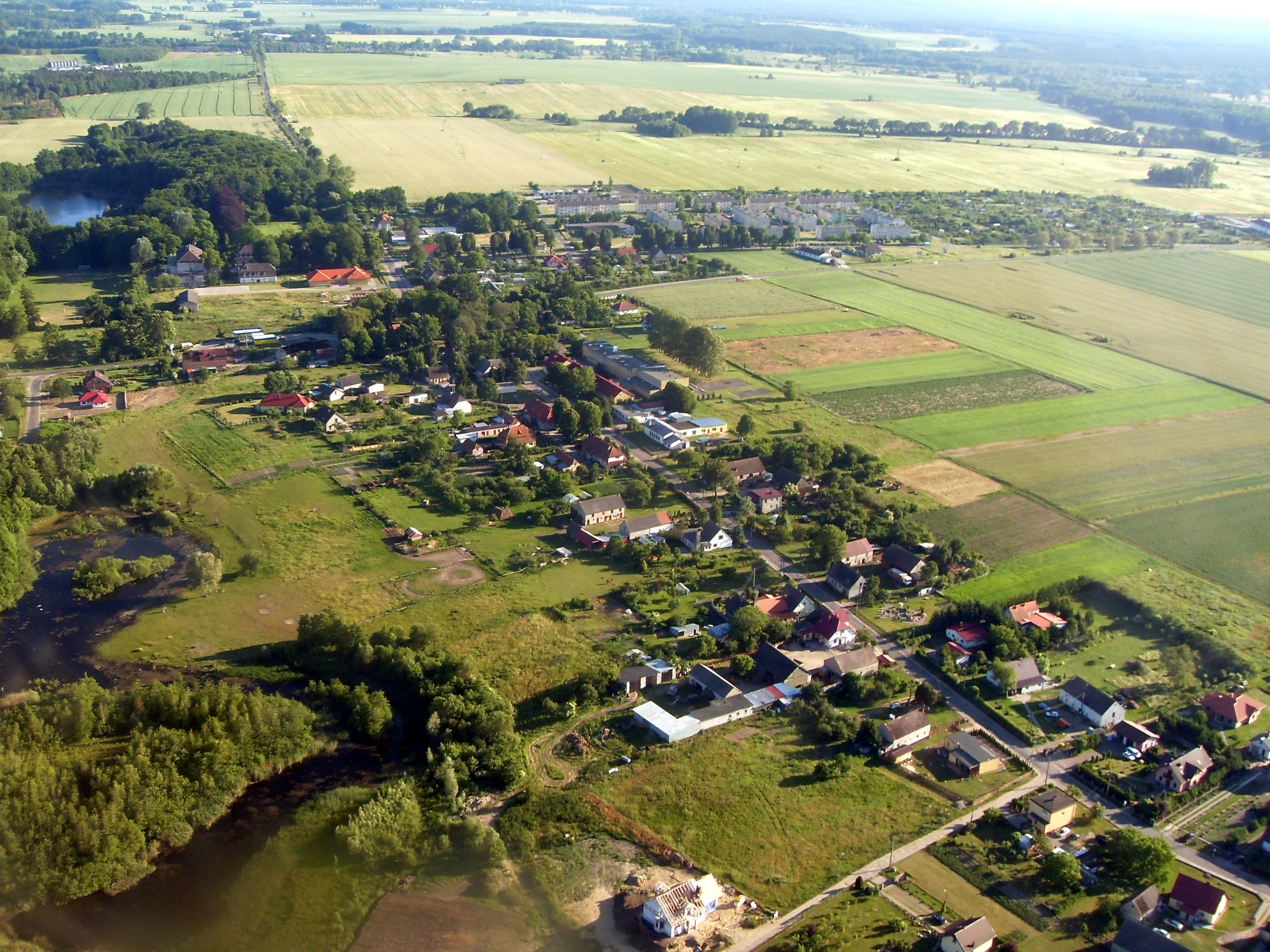
- Aerial view

- Location within Poland
- Coordinates: 53°32′53″N 14°57′20″E
- Country: Poland
- Voivodeship: West Pomeranian
- County: Goleniów
- Gmina: Goleniów

Population
  - Total: 1,420
- Time zone: UTC+1 (CET)
  - Summer (DST): UTC+2 (CEST)
- Vehicle registration: ZGL

Mosty [ˈmɔstɨ] is a village in the administrative district of Gmina Goleniów, within Goleniów County, West Pomeranian Voivodeship, in north-western Poland. It lies approximately 10 km (6 mi) east of Goleniów and 29 km (18 mi) north-east of the regional capital Szczecin.

For the history of the region, see History of Pomerania.

The village has a population of 1,420.
