= Święta, West Pomeranian Voivodeship =

Święta
- Village
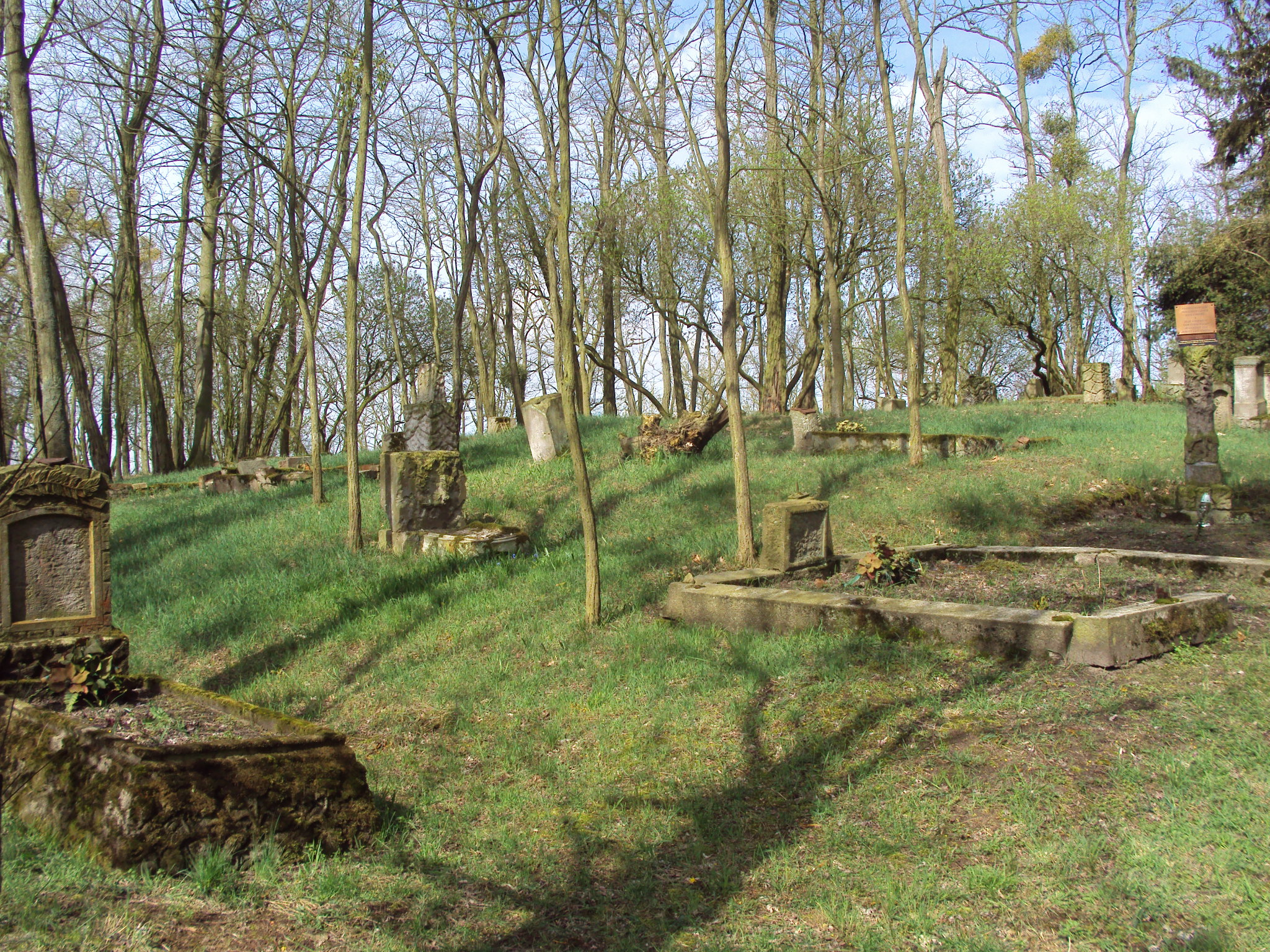

- Location within Poland
- Coordinates: 53°33′28″N 14°37′46″E
- Country: Poland
- Voivodeship: West Pomeranian
- County: Goleniów
- Gmina: Goleniów
- Population (approx.): 300

Święta (Polish: [ˈɕfjɛnta]; German: Langenberg) is a village in the administrative district of Gmina Goleniów, within Goleniów County, West Pomeranian Voivodeship, in north-western Poland.

For the history of the region, see History of Pomerania.

The village has an approximate population of 300.
