= Gmina Goleniów =

Gmina Goleniów Goleniów Commune
- Gmina
- Flag Coat of arms
- Interactive map of Gmina Goleniów
- Coordinates (Goleniów): 53°33′N 14°49′E
- Country: Poland
- Voivodeship: West Pomeranian
- County: Goleniów
- Seat: Goleniów

Area
  - Total: 443.06 km^{2} (171.07 sq mi)

Population (2006)
  - Total: 33,137
  - Density: 74.791/km^{2} (193.71/sq mi)
  - Urban: 22,448
  - Rural: 10,689
- Website: http://www.goleniow.pl/

Gmina Goleniów is an urban-rural gmina (administrative district) in Goleniów County, West Pomeranian Voivodeship, in north-western Poland. Its seat is the town of Goleniów, which lies approximately 22 kilometres (14 mi) north-east of the regional capital Szczecin.

The gmina covers an area of 443.06 square kilometres (171.1 sq mi), and as of 2006 its total population is 33,137 (out of which the population of Goleniów amounts to 22,448, and the population of the rural part of the gmina is 10,689).

== Villages ==
Apart from the town of Goleniów, Gmina Goleniów contains the villages and settlements of Bącznik, Białuń, Bolechowo, Bolesławice, Borzysławiec, Budno, Burowo, Bystra, Czarna Łąka, Danowo, Dobroszyn, Domastryjewo, Glewice, Gniazdowo, Grabina, Imno, Ininka, Inoujście, Iwno, Kamieniska, Kąty, Kępy Lubczyńskie, Kliniska Wielkie, Komarowo, Krępsko, Krzewno, Łaniewo, Łęsko, Łozienica, Lubczyna, Marszewo, Miękowo, Modrzewie, Mosty, Mosty-Osiedle, Nadrzecze, Niedamierz, Niewiadowo, Podańsko, Pucice, Pucie, Pucko, Rurka, Rurzyca, Smolniki, Stawno, Święta, Tarnowiec, Tarnówko, Trzebuskie Łęgi, Twarogi, Wierzchosław, Zaborze, Zabród, Załom, Zamęcie, Żdżary, Żółwia and Żółwia Błoć.

== Neighbouring gminas ==
Gmina Goleniów is bordered by the city of Szczecin and by the gminas of Kobylanka, Maszewo, Osina, Police, Przybiernów, Stargard and Stepnica.
