= Mieleński Cut =

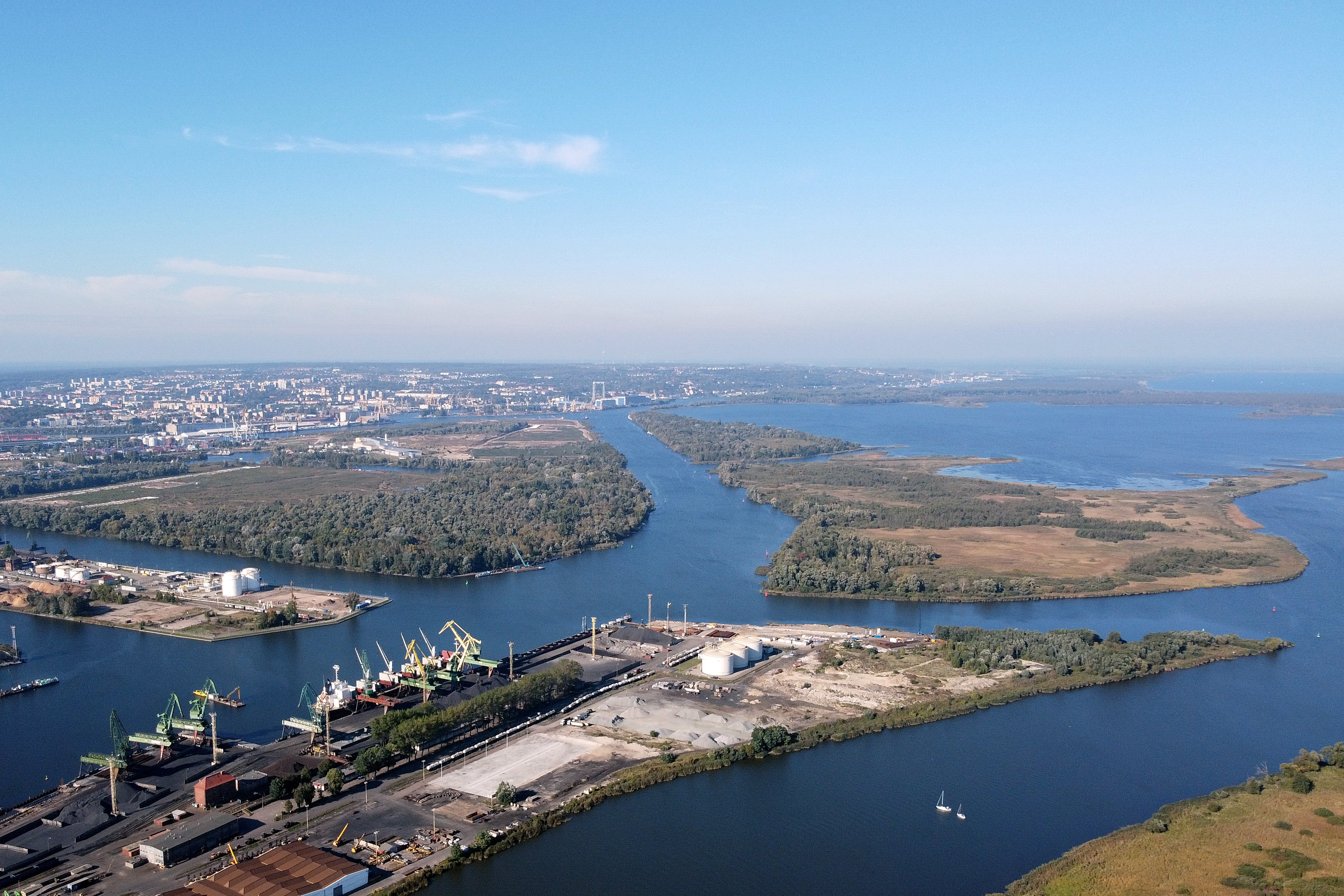
- Mieleński Cut (view from the south)
- Interactive map of Mieleński Cut
- Location: Szczecin, West Pomeranian Voivodeship, Poland

Specifications
- Length: 5 km (3.1 miles)
- Status: Navigable

Geography
- Start point: Oder River
- End point: Parnica
- Beginning coordinates: 53°27′27″N 14°35′52″E
- Ending coordinates: 53°24′41″N 14°36′39″E

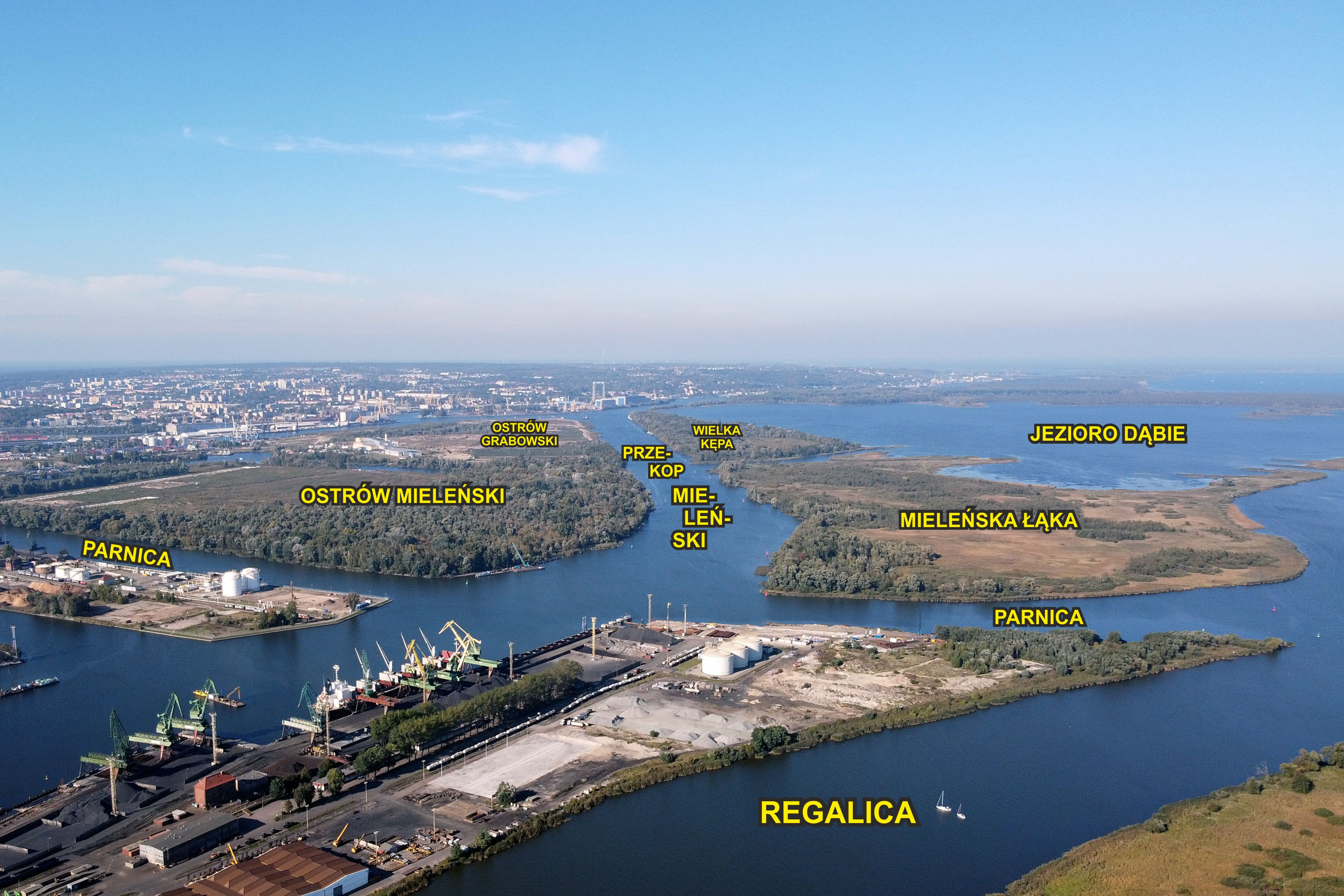
Mieleński Cut – view from the south (annotated)

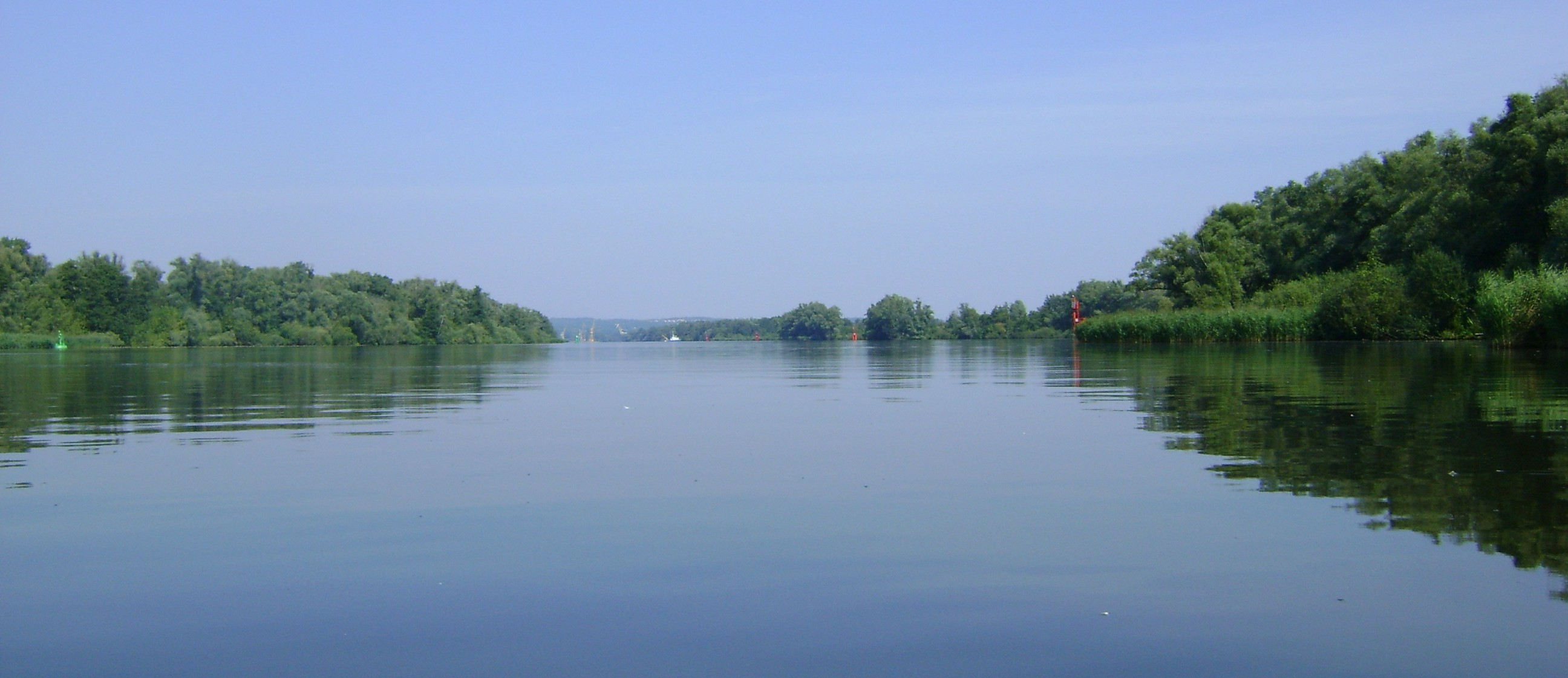
Mieleński Cut (view northward from its junction with the Parnica)

Mieleński Cut (1945–1949: Nowy Przekop – "New Cut") is a canal in Szczecin, located in the Lower Oder Valley on the Międzyodrze islands, in the West Pomeranian Voivodeship of Poland. It forms part of the waterways of the Port of Szczecin.

The canal runs from the Oder River to the northern bank of the Parnica. It is a navigable canal approximately 5 km long with a depth of 10.5 m. The northern section is about 1,500 m long and 90 m wide, with its axis aligned roughly along 190°–010°.

At the level of the Orli Przesmyk strait and the Gnieźnieńskie Quay, opposite the northern tip of Ostrów Grabowski, the Mieleński Cut connects with the Grabowski Canal, which in turn links it to the Oder from the west. The southern section of the canal runs southeast toward the Górniczy Basin and the Parnica.

The name Mieleński Cut was officially introduced in 1949, replacing the German name Mölln Fahrt.
