= Lower Oder Valley =

Region of Poland and Germany

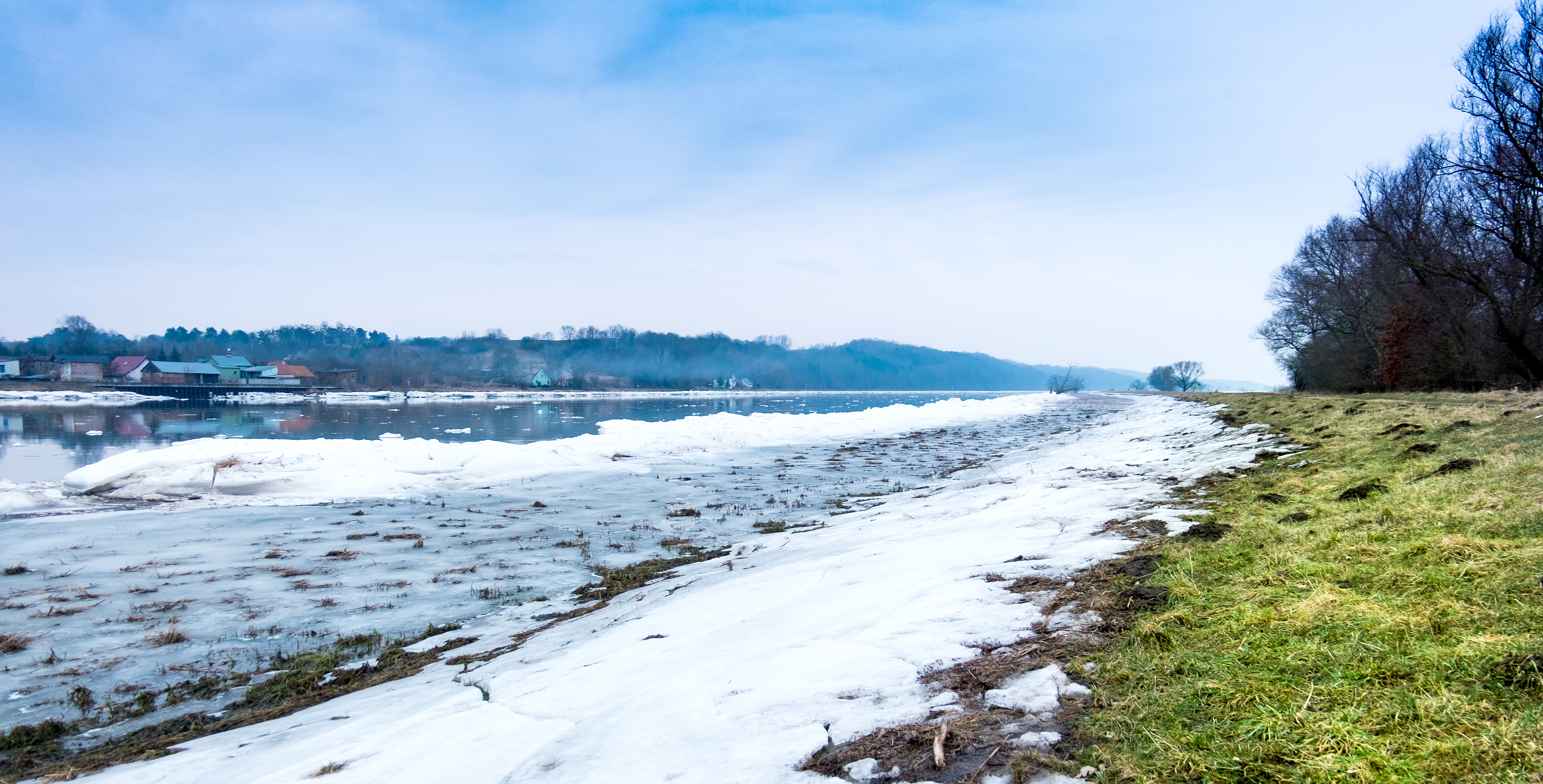
On the Oder River in Krajnik Dolny

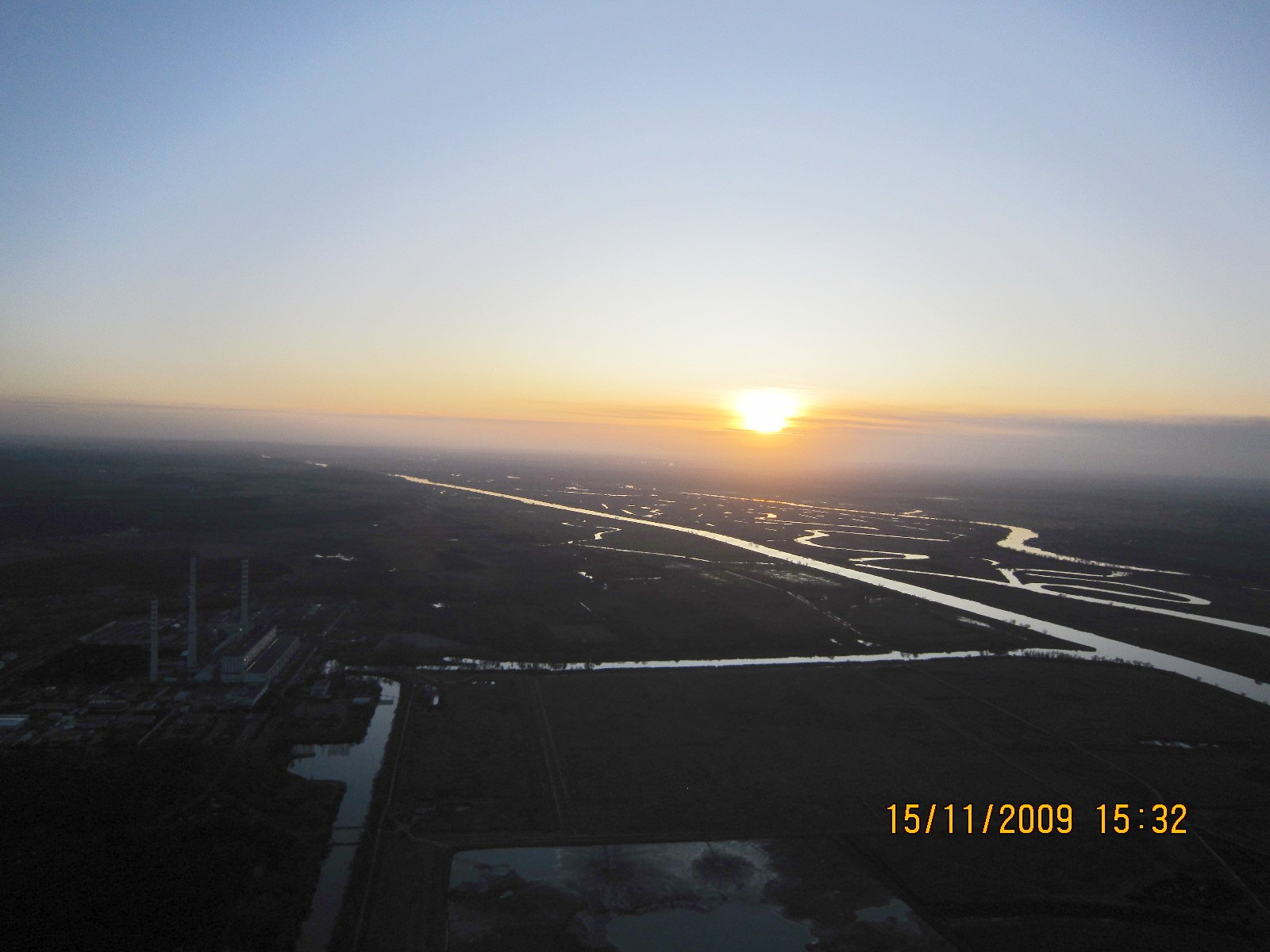
Lower Oder Valley from the air

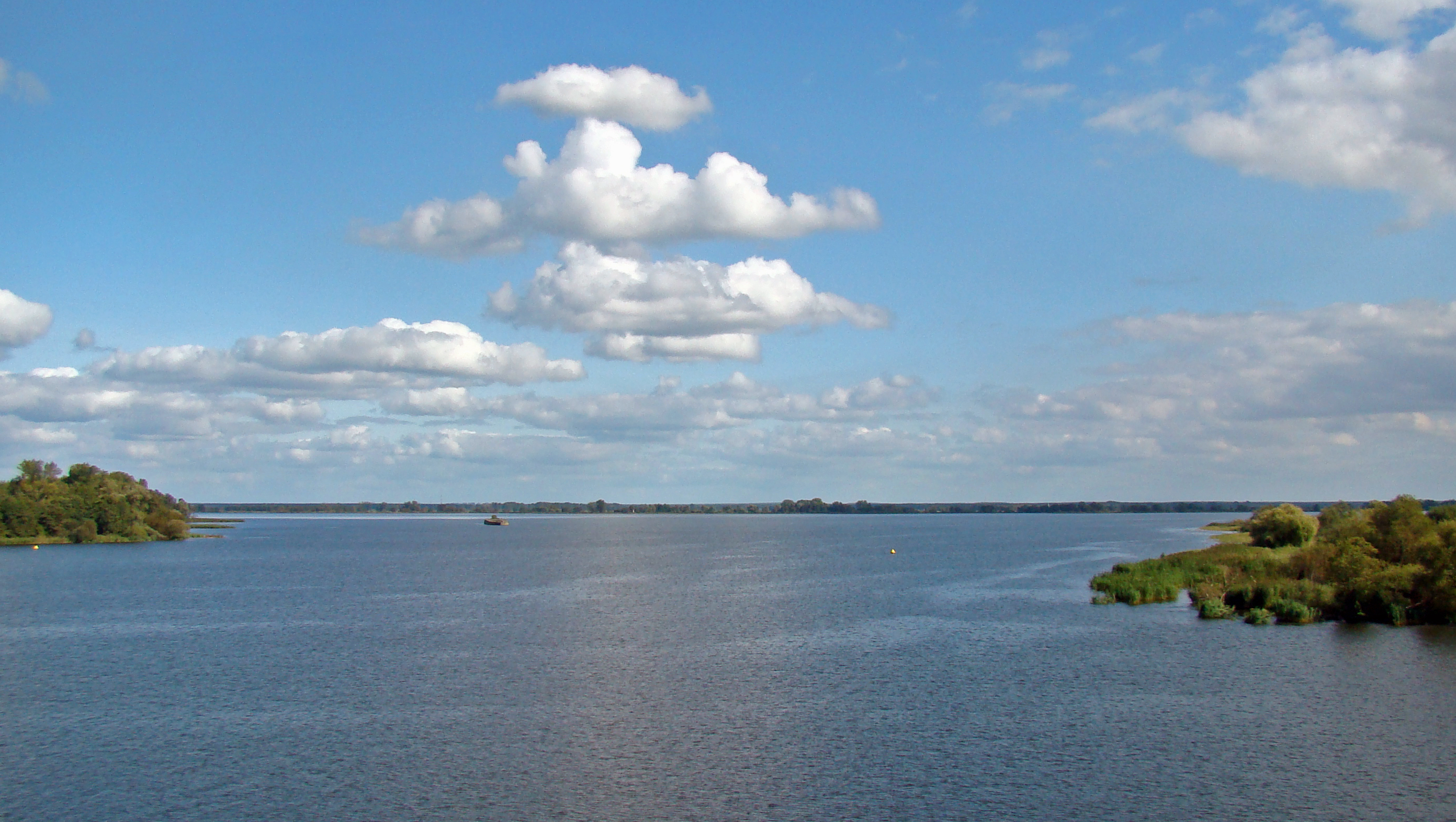
Iński Nurt and Lake Dąbie

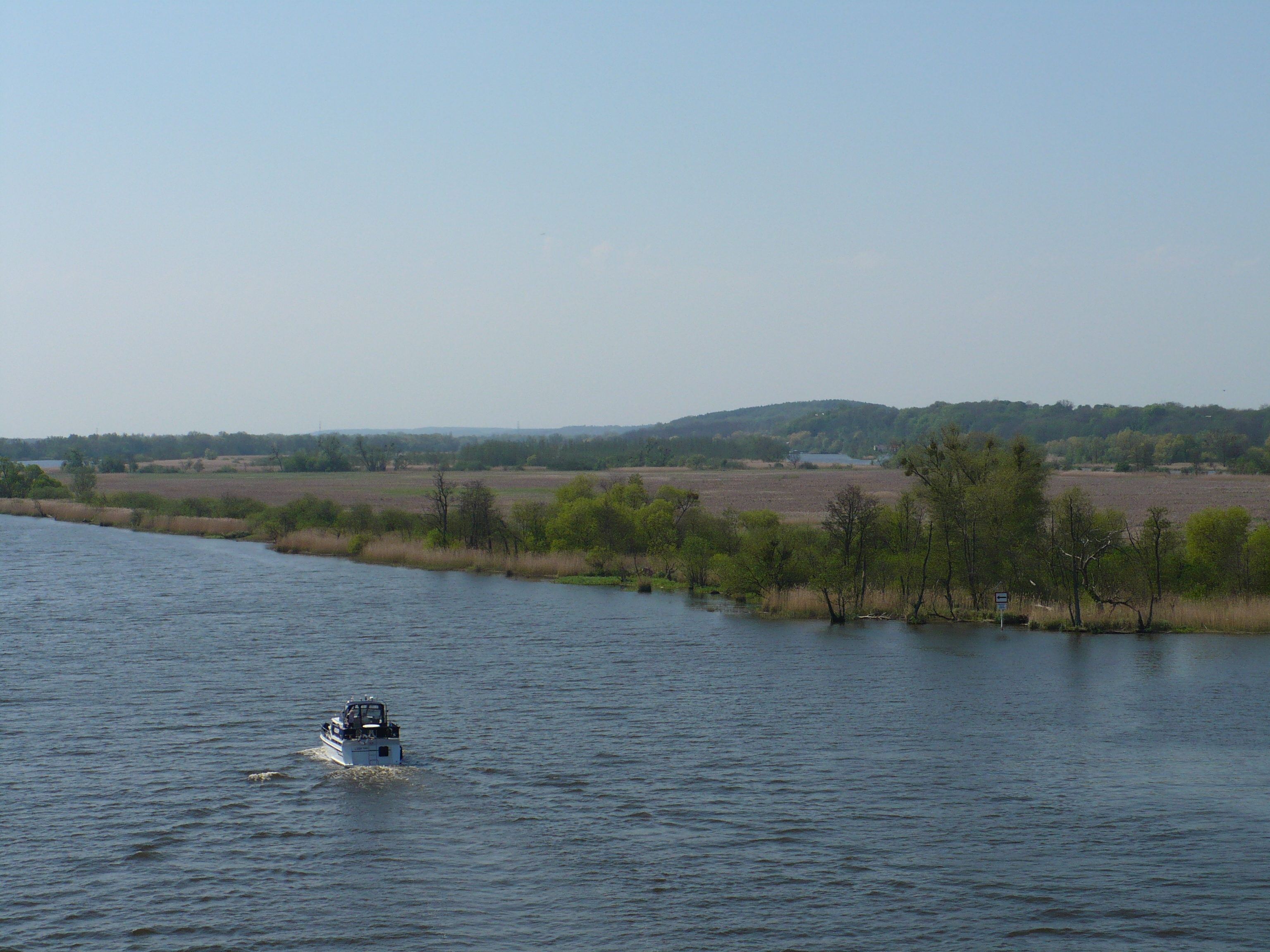
Międzyodrze

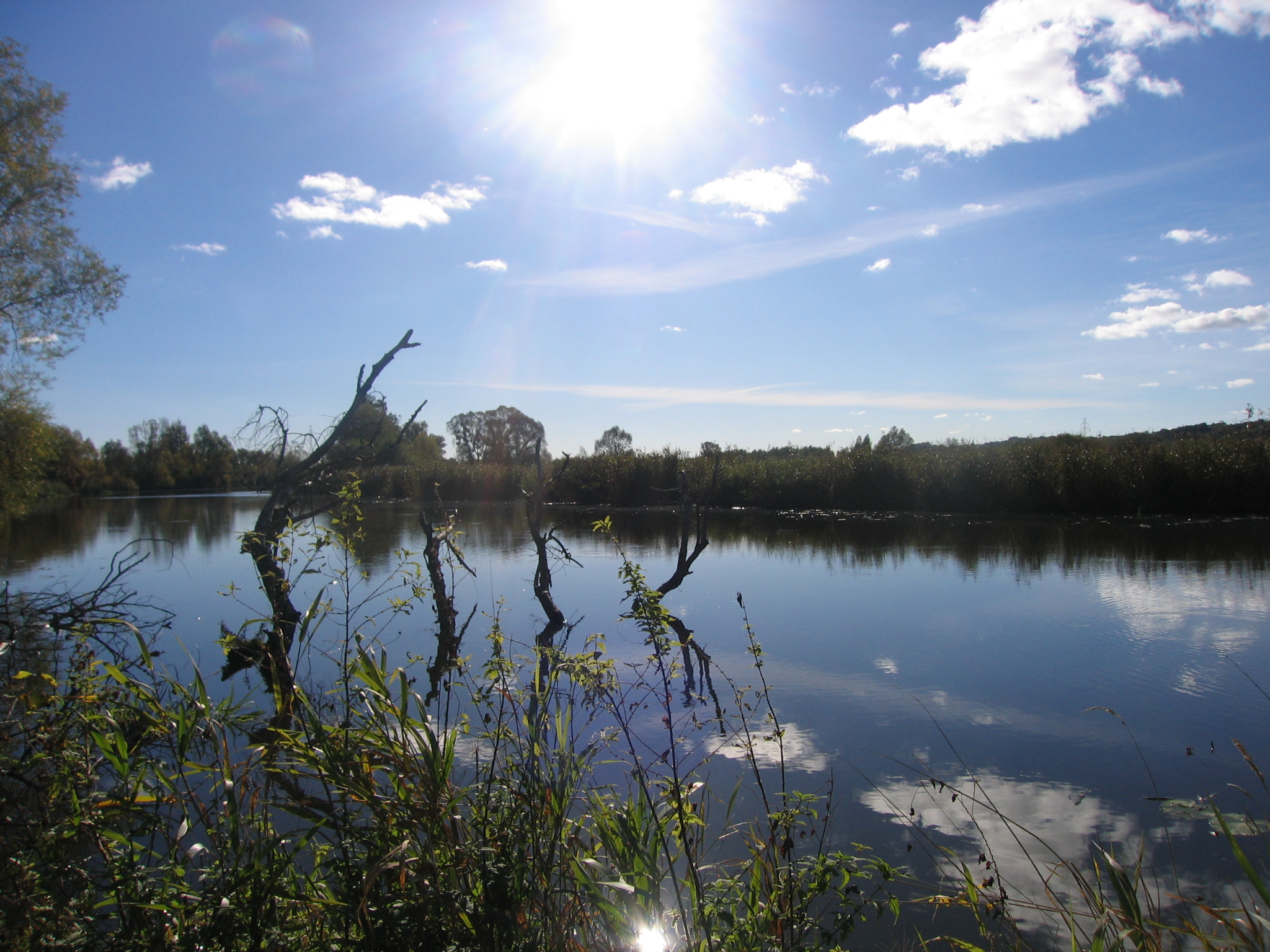
Oder branch – Łarpia surrounding the Polickie Łąki island in Police

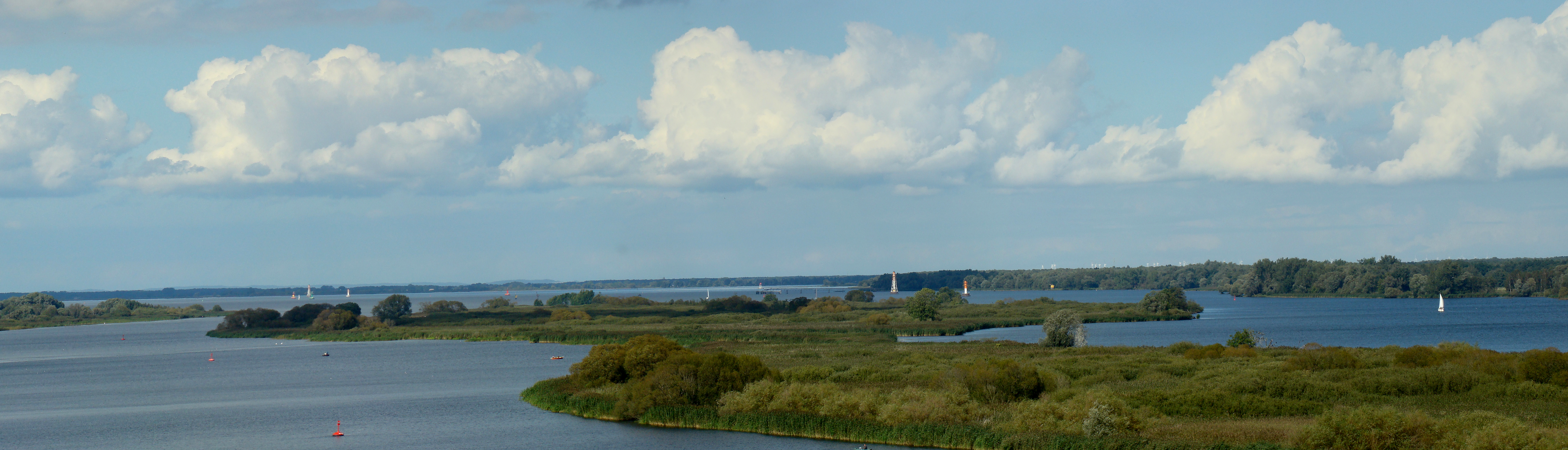
Oder River mouth into Szczecin Lagoon (Roztoka Odrzańska)

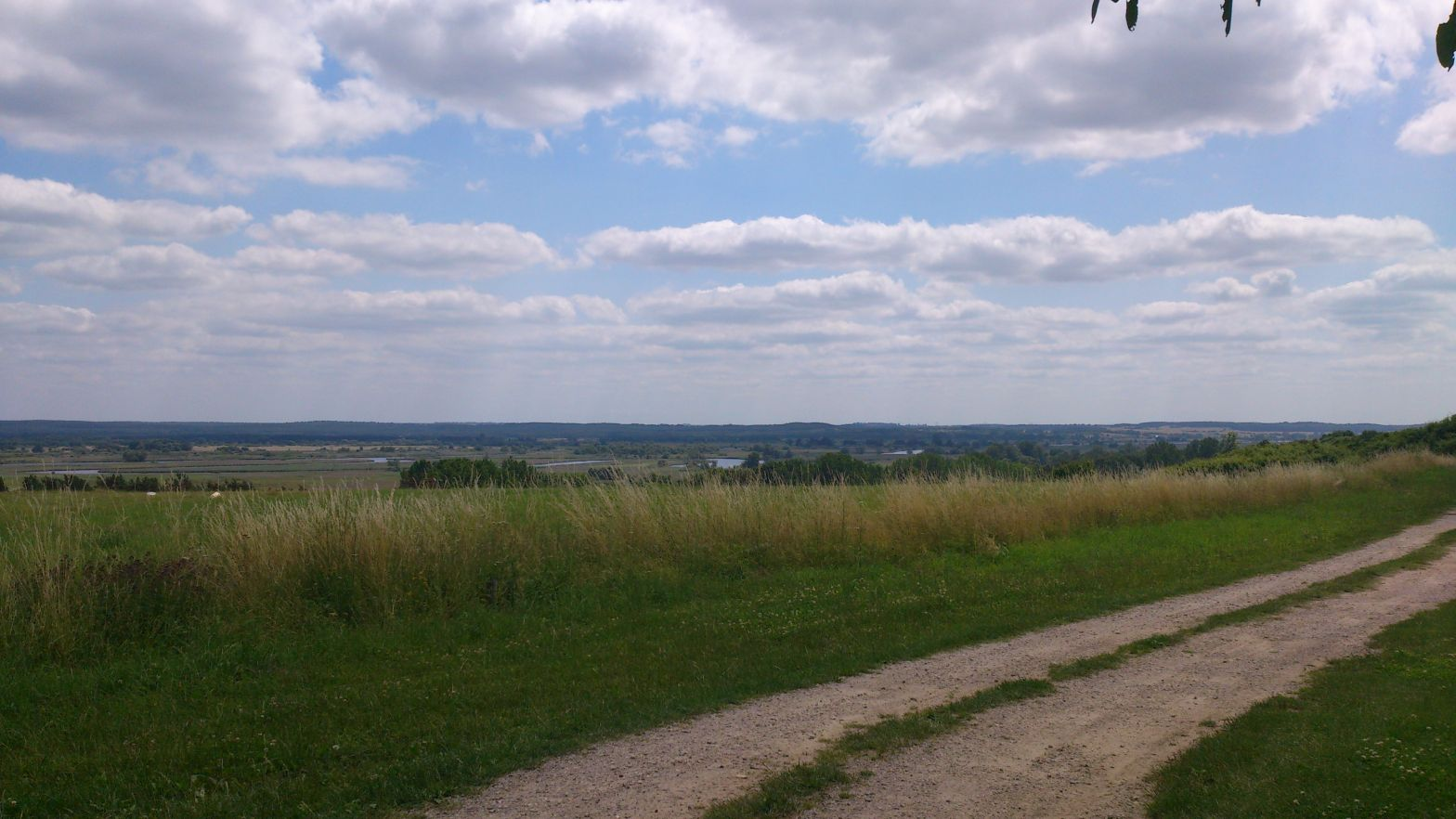
Lower Oder Valley near Gartz

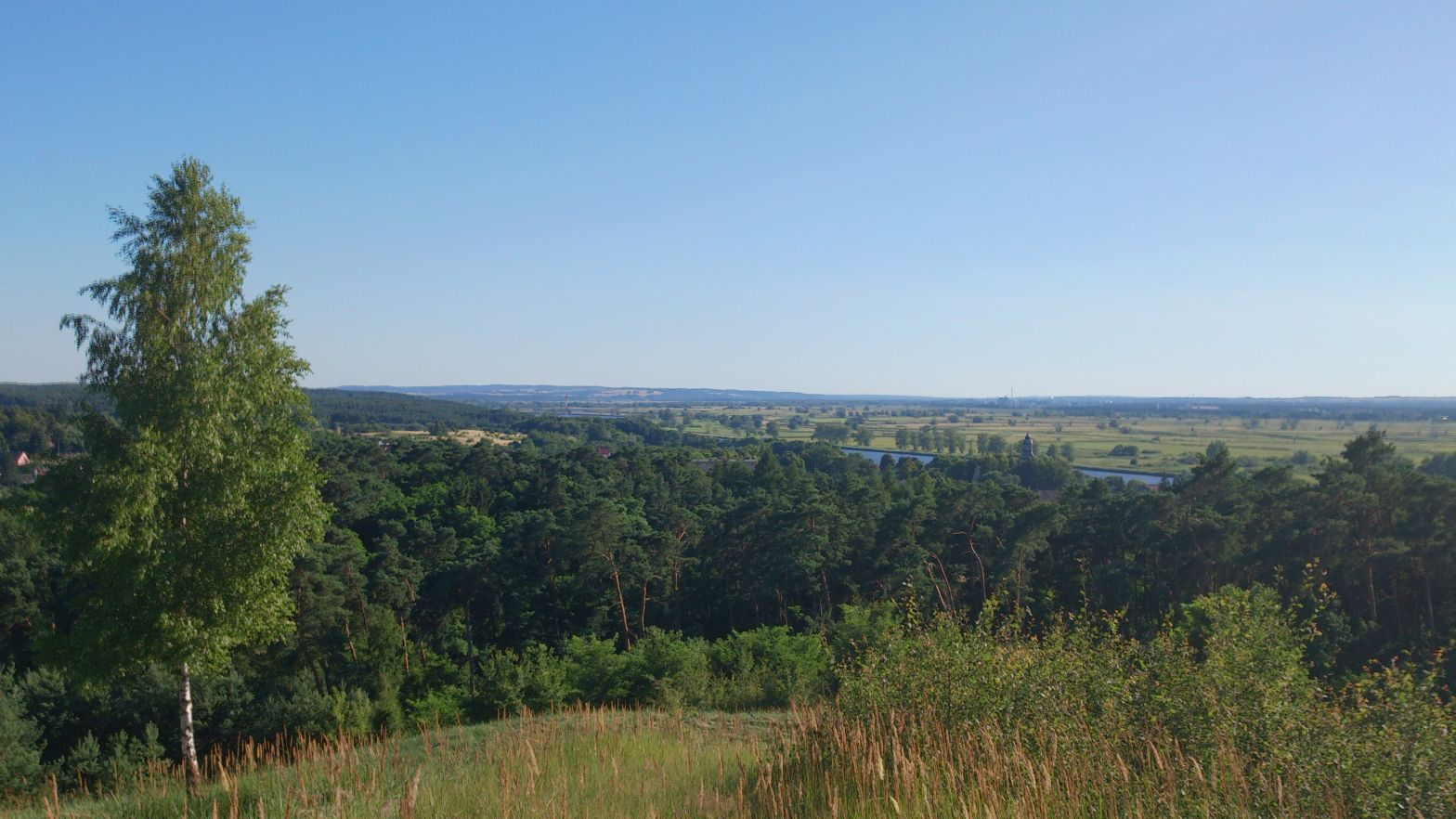
Lower Oder Valley near Widuchowa

Lower Oder Valley (Polish: Dolina Dolnej Odry, German: Unteres Odertal, physico-geographical code 313.24) is a mesoregion of the Szczecin Coast in north-western Poland and north-eastern Germany. It encompasses the valley of the Oder River from the vicinity of Cedynia to the Szczecin Lagoon near Stepnica. The valley is approximately 95 km long and ranges in width from 2 to 12 km.

== Geography ==
The Lower Oder Valley consists of several subregions:

- Osinów Dolny – Widuchowa: The main axis is a single riverbed of the Oder and the 'Hohensaaten-Friedrichsthaler Wasserstrasse', interconnected by numerous canals and polders. Major tributaries include the 'Alte Oder' with the Oder–Havel Canal (left) and Rurzyca River (right). The valley is bordered to the east by the Krzymowskie Hills and the undulating Wełtyń Plain. Near Cedynia, the area is known as the 'Cedynia Delta' ('Żuławy Cedyńskie').
- Międzyodrze: Above Widuchowa, the valley splits into two main channels – the Western Oder and Eastern Oder (Regalica) – connected by multiple canals, oxbows, and polders. Major islands include Zaleskie Łęgi, Dębina, Ostrów Grabowski, Pucka Island, Polickie Łąki in Police, and Wielkie Bagno Kurowskie and Ustowskie Mokradła. Significant tributaries: Welse River (L), Bukowa River (L), Tywa River (R), Omulna River (R). Westward, the valley is bordered by the Szczecin Hills (including Stobno Embankment and Warszewo Hills near Szczecin), and eastward by the Bukowe Hills moraines.
- Lake Dąbie: A deltaic lake with numerous polders on its eastern bank. Its main tributary is the Płonia River.
- Roztoka Odrzańska: The estuary of the Oder and the outlet to the Szczecin Lagoon, including riparian wetlands at the eastern edge of the Wkrzańska Forest and the western edge of the Goleniów Forest. Main tributaries include the Ina River (R), Gowienica River (R), and Gunica River (L).

== Cities and towns ==
- Cedynia (Poland)
- Gartz (Oder) (Germany)
- Gryfino (Poland)
- Police (Poland)
- Schwedt (Germany)
- Stepnica (Poland)
- Szczecin (Poland)

== Tourism towns ==
- Czarna Łąka (Poland)
- Czarnocin (Poland)
- Lubczyna (Poland)
- Mescherin (Germany)
- Moczyły (Poland)
- Police (Poland)
- Siadło Dolne (Poland)
- Stepnica (Poland)
- Stolpe (Angermünde) (Germany)
- Trzebież (Poland)
- Widuchowa (Poland)

== Transport ==
- Border crossings: Osinów Dolny – Hohenwutzen (DW124–B158), Krajnik Dolny – Schwedt (DK26–B166), Gryfino – Mescherin (DW120–B113)
- A6 motorway
- Swing railway bridge over the Regalica River in Podjuchy (Szczecin–Gryfino line)
- Road bridges: Gryfitów Bridge (DK31), Pomorzan Bridge (DK31), Długi Bridge (DK10), Portowy Bridge (DK10), Pioneers of Szczecin City Bridge (DK10), Customs Bridge in Szczecin
- Szczecin western bypass (planned)

== History ==
The valley's strategic location near the sea, river routes, trade paths, and urban centers has historically attracted Pomeranian, Polish, German (including Prussian and Brandenburgian), Swedish, and Danish influences. Early Slavic tribes, primarily Pomeranians and Wkrzanie, inhabited the region. In 972, the Battle of Cedynia took place. Ten centuries later, the Berlin offensive reached this area. The current landscape was heavily shaped during the Prussian Province of Pomerania era, when canals, hydraulic structures, and industrial, agricultural, and navigational facilities were constructed.

== Nature conservation ==
Floodplain ecosystems are dominated by wetlands and marshes. Upland areas host meadows, xerothermic habitats, and forests. Nearby large forest complexes include Bukowa Forest, Goleniów Forest, Piaskowa Forest, and Wkrzańska Forest.

The valley supports significant populations of waterfowl and wetland birds, including up to 9,000 cranes during autumn migrations. It is a key habitat for the white-tailed eagle and hosts at least 34 species of birds listed in Annex I of the EU Birds Directive and 14 species in the Polish Red Book. Other vertebrates, including moose and beavers, are abundant.

Notable conservation initiatives include the **Lower Odra International Park**, comprising the Lower Odra Valley Landscape Park (Poland) and the German Lower Oder Valley National Park (*Nationalpark Unteres Odertal*). The southern part includes the Cedynia Landscape Park. The valley is part of the Natura 2000 network: Special Protection Area *Lower Oder Valley* (PLB320003) and Special Areas of Conservation *Lower Oder* (PLH320037) and *Oder Estuary and Szczecin Lagoon* (PLH320018).

=== Nature reserves ===
- Białodrzew Kopicki
- Bielinek
- Czarnocin
- Kanał Kwiatowy
- Kurowskie Błota
- Olszanka
- Uroczysko Święta
- Wrzosowiska Cedyńskie
- Słoneczne Wzgórza
- Wzgórze Widokowe nad Międzyodrzem
- Krzywy Las (Crooked Forest)
- Dolina Miłości

Other protected areas: Szczecin Lagoon Nature Park, *Zaleskie Łęgi* and *Dębina* landscape complexes, and the Klucki Ostrów ecological site.

== Tourism ==
The valley is popular for sailing and kayaking. Small ship cruises and hydrofoil services operate along the Szczecin–Świnoujście route. Numerous hiking and cycling trails are available on both sides of the valley.

=== Viewpoints ===
- Left bank: Warszewo Hills, Stobno Embankment, Szczecin – Cathedral tower, castle tower, museum tower at Wały Chrobrego; German side – Stolpe observation tower, Mescherin – Stettiner Berg, Seeberg, *Flying Crane* observation tower, Kroatenberg near Gartz
- Right bank: Bukowe Hills, Góra Zielonczyn, Blankowe Hills, Sarbskie Górki, Dolina Miłości, Cedynia tower, Góra Czcibora, Bielinek reserve, Słoneczne Wzgórza

=== Trails ===
- Odra–Neisse Cycle Route (red)
- Szczecin Lagoon Bicycle Route R-66 (green)
- Green Oder Trail
- Nadodrzański Trail (red)
- Rajska Dolina Trail (green)
- Stepnicko-Rokicki Trail (green)
- Międzyodrze kayaking route
- Berlin–Szczecin–Baltic water route

== Panoramas ==
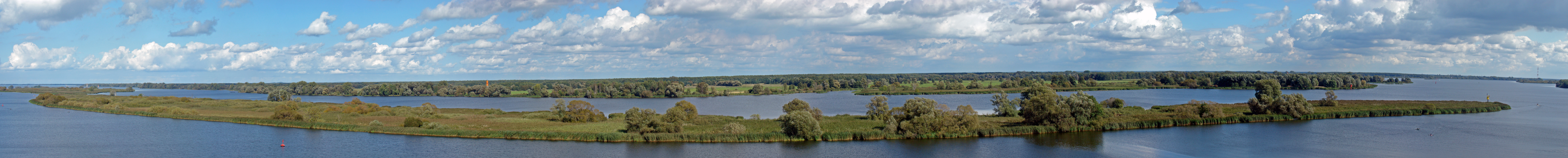
- – Długi Ostrów Island and Oder River at the Roztoka Odrzańska estuary
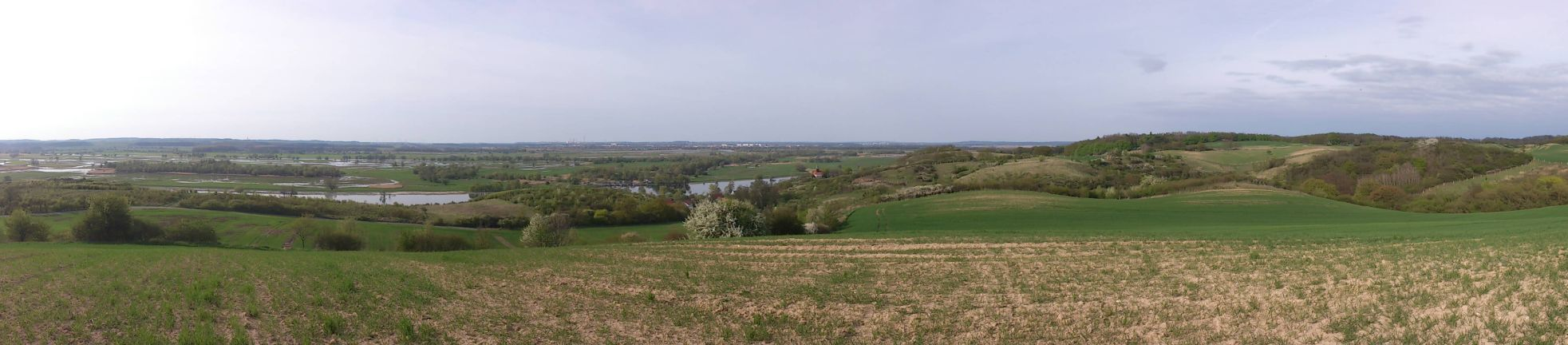
- – View from the Krzymowskie Hills near Zatonia Dolna

== Publications ==
- Marek Cichoń, *Lower Oder Valley* (*The Lower Odra Valley*, *Das Untere Odertal*), Soft Vision, Szczecin, 2007, ISBN 978-83-921646-5-4

== See also ==
- Police canals
- Freienwald Depression
