= Warfare in Medieval Poland =

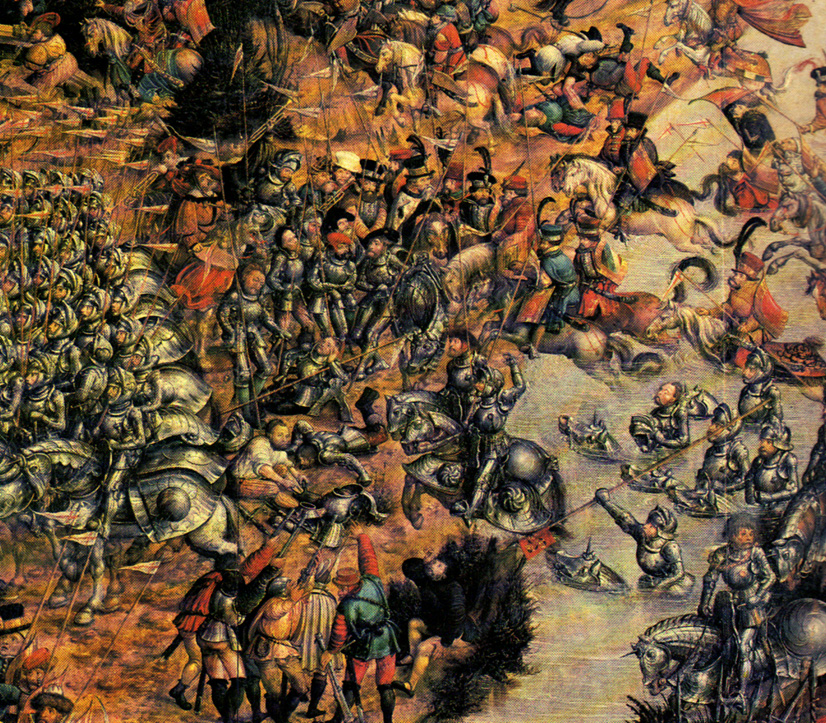
Battle of Orsza 1514. National Museum in Warsaw, unknown author of 16th century. Observe the masses of heavy armoured cavalry and lightly equipped hussars

Warfare in Medieval Poland covers the military history of Poland during the Piast and Jagiellon dynasties (10th–16th centuries).

== Periodization ==
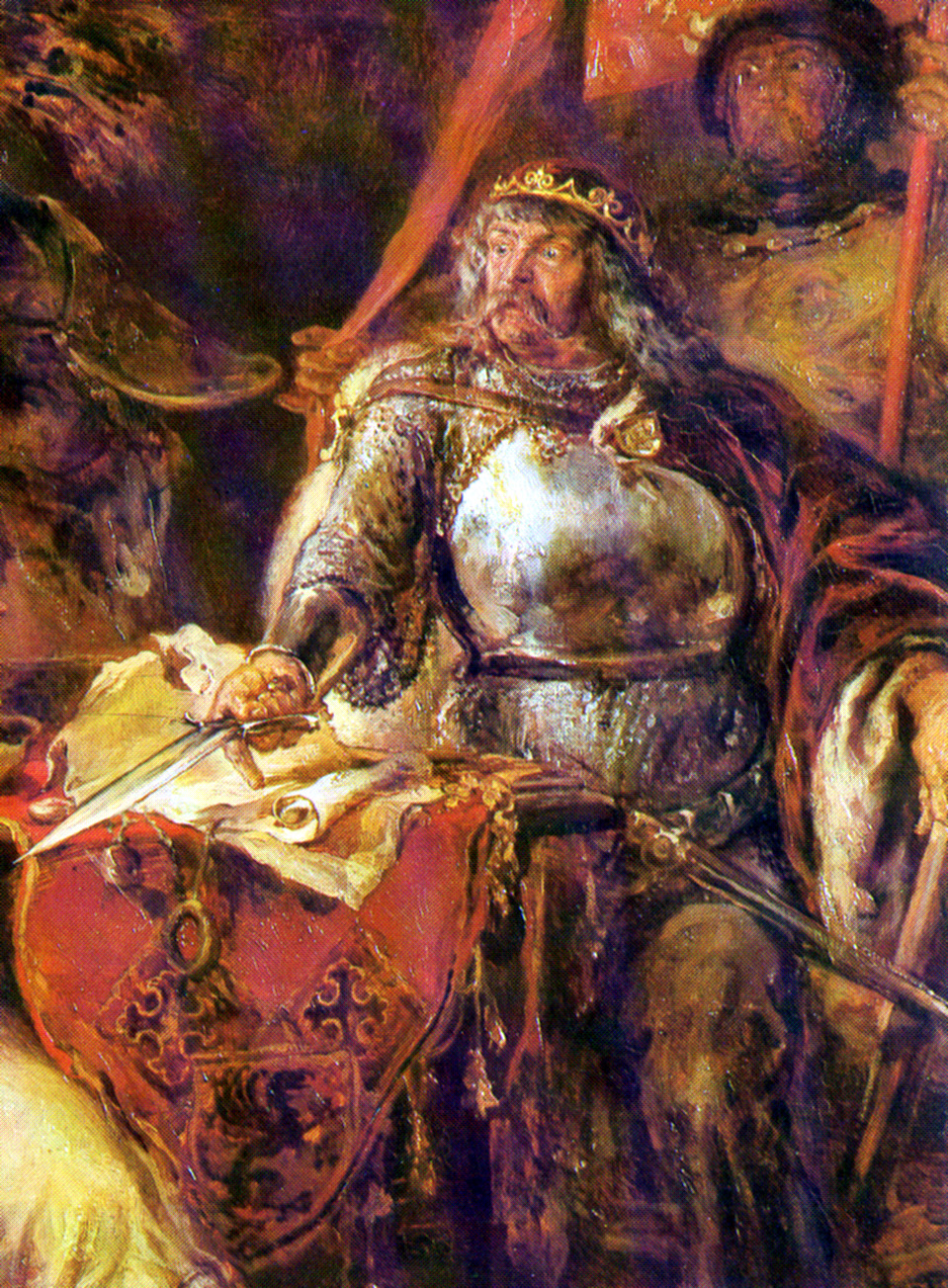
Władysław I the Elbow-high in the composite armour of the 14th century

In the military history of Poland in the Middle Ages one has to separate three different periods: early, transitional, and late, each demarcated by the reign of particular princes and kings. The early medieval period was enclosed between times of Mieszko I and Bolesław III Wrymouth, the transitional period spanned the times of the Fragmentation of the State to the rule of Władysław I the Elbow-high, and the late period from Casimir III the Great through dynasties of Angevins and Jagiellons up to 1514.

There are some difficulties with establishing the time-frame of the epoch, and the territory of the state, especially in the earliest period, and in the time of Fragmentation of Poland as well.^{[a]} There are no doubts as to the beginning of the medieval period of Polish history – it was at the start of the reign of Mieszko I, and the first historically annotated battles with Wichmann the Younger (967) the Veleti, and the battle of Cedynia in 972. However it is much more difficult to establish the end of the era as there is no definite turning point in the history of Poland, parallel to events such as the Fall of Constantinople (1453), the discovery of America by Cristopher Columbus (1492), or the beginning of the Reformation (1517) in Western and Southern Europe. Most historians agree, that the end of the medieval age and the beginning of the Renaissance in Poland took place during the rule of the Jagiellon dynasty, probably in its waning period (times of Sigismund I the Old). It is much more difficult to establish a single unique battle of that period that can be considered a "final one."

In the history of warfare in Western Europe the end of the medieval period is strictly connected to the end of chivalry, its ethos, and its method of fighting. In Poland, as well as in some other countries of Eastern Europe, knights (noblemen, the Polish szlachta) were called for war (pospolite ruszenie) until the end of the 18th century, or until the end of the (Saxon times). In such circumstances the criteria for the end of the chivalry ethos - as the end of medieval times in Poland - has to be rejected. Rather, the appropriate moment is more likely the time when heavy cavalry, with its full plate armour, was replaced with lighter formations like the husaria. The painting, in the collection of National Museum in Warsaw, known as The Battle of Orsza depicts the common fighting formations of heavy, armoured cavalry, and light hussars. The Battle of Orsha took place in the Fall of 1514. During the battle of Obertyn (1531) there was only light cavalry present on the Polish side. It is possible (but speculative) that these two dates are the border points; the last medieval battle (Orsha) and first battle of modern times (Obertyn).

== Armament ==
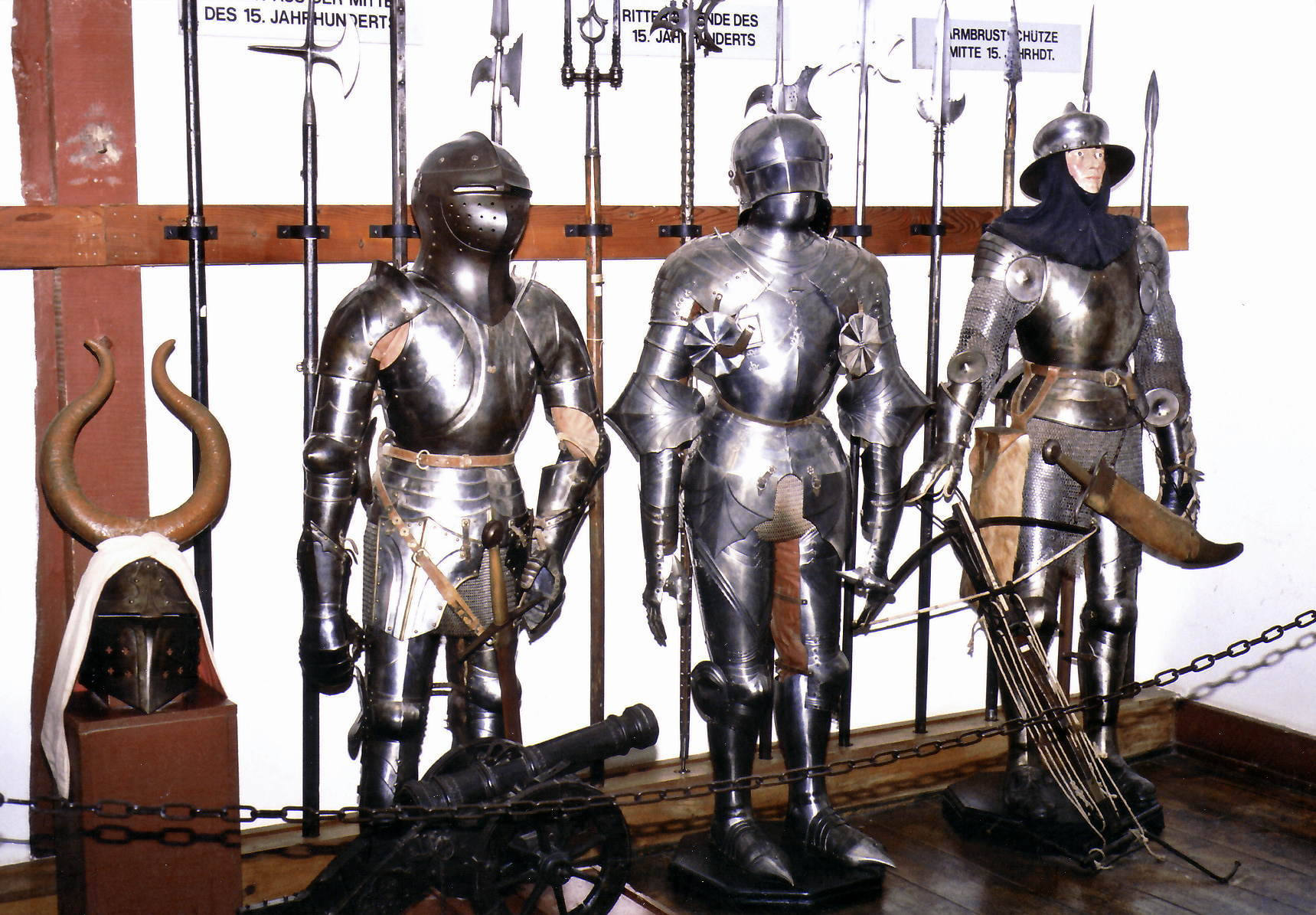
Armors of 15th century

The basic weapon of the European knight was the sword and the spear (heavy, thrusting weapon). Besides these, a typical arsenal included a number of small armaments from daggers to battle axes, maces, horseman's picks, and many others. The Polish sword was no different than swords used in the West – it was straight, with a blade 80–120 cm long, 1,0 - 1,8 kg of weight, having an almond-shaped pommel and a bar crossguard. The spear, in Poland of the time referred to as "wood" (pol. drzewo), was 3,5 - 4,5 m long, had a spearhead of lancet-like or leaf-like shape, but there were also heavier, armour-piercing rhomboid spearheads.

Defensive armament - armour – at first included the gambeson, then developed into the brigandine, followed by hauberk, and then mail with some plate elements, such as breastplates and brassards, and finally panoply, which by the end of 16th century gained its perfect form, protecting the whole of a knight's body, and sometimes his horse. There were some differences between the rich knights of Małopolska, Wielkopolska or Śląsk and those of Mazowsze, who, because they faced enemies from the East, like Old Prussians, Lithuanians, and Tatars, partially adopted their fighting manners, and lighter armament as well. Even their horses were smaller and lighter.

Different armament was used by infantry, which marched onto the battlefield in close order formations of shield-bearers covering heavy cavalry detachments, or mobile units of bowmen and cross-bowmen, and sometimes irregulars, who used different weapons specialized to fight both foot soldiers and cavalry: (war hammer, war scythe, glaive, fork, flail, morgenstern, halberd, bardiche). Defensive armaments of the infantry consisted of shields (wooden, round or oval, through light bucklers, up to heavy pavises), quilted jackets and gambesons or brigandines. A characteristic helmet of the foot soldier was the kettle hat - an iron hat with board brim. Earlier infantry units wore conical helmets, later sallets, but more often thick felt caps. Camp followers were used mainly for field work and sometimes to defend fortified camps or trains. Their armament was simple and coincidental.

There were many different types of throwing weapons. The sling went out of use, and the composite bow did not appear until the arrival of the Mongols in the 13th century. Before their invasion, the Poles used straight, long, yew bows. The crossbow reached Poland relatively early, undoubtedly during wars of Bolesław III Krzywousty in the 12th century. Javelins and throwing axes were also in use. During sieges both defenders and attackers commonly used a variety of heavy hurling machines like catapults, onagers, trebuchets etc., and from the end of the 14th century bombards, arquebuses, and finally cannons.

With increasing tension and fighting along the eastern border, Poles adopted many eastern-style war customs and weapons. This is why the sword was so easily and so commonly replaced in the 16th century with the szabla. Previously, the szabla evoked aversion on the part of the noblemen; it was even forbidden to present it during formal reviews. This change would not probably have happened so widely and so quickly without the Polish–Lithuanian union. In the Grand Duchy of Lithuania, especially in Rus', the eastern style was adopted much earlier.

The most visible armour transformation in medieval times was that of the helmet, which changed its shape from a conical shape into a great helm (11th-12th century) and later to the bascinet with different shapes in following centuries.

The knight was usually accompanied by one, two or more squires, the most experienced of whom (mainly from the impoverished szlachta) had to protect their master during the battle, and to hand him the most convenient weapons. Other servants had to deliver fresh horses, spears, shields, and take care of wounded men. All were armed with swords or falchions and often bows or cross bows. They all formed the smallest element in the army's structure − the kopia, or Lances fournies.

Wealthy knights of Wielkopolska and Śląsk did not differ much – in the sense of weapons and armour – from the western knighthood. Novelties were accepted quickly, and the only constraining factor was the wealth of the knight. Travelers from the West (as for example Widukind of Corvey, or bishop Thietmar of Merseburg), wrote with respect of the pancerni of Mieszko I, and Bolesław I Chrobry. Much later, at tournaments of European Western kingdoms, the Polish knight Zawisza Czarny z Garbowa ("Zawisza the Black") gained eternal fame and became known for his bravery, chivalry, and his black armour. However, until the battle of Grunwald, 15 July 1410, most of Polish knights were less armoured than their competitors from the West, due to the fact that many of the members of szlachta were relatively poor. In the 15th century however, knights became much wealthier as export of grains and forest goods grew rapidly during this period which became a source of wealth for the szlachta.

An important element of medieval army equipment was the horse. Horses were bred in Poland from prehistoric times. Imported from abroad or taken during the war high blood stallions and mares were incorporated into szlachta's herds for the quality improvement of Polish horse breeds. The size of these herds is unknown, but likely large.^{[b]}

== Fortifications ==
Fortified grodys (a fortified Slavic town or castle) were built in Poland along the borders, near the crossings of main trade routes, in naturally defensive locations (hills, river curves), as centers of administration, and defensive strongholds in case of enemy invasion. In the very beginning they were simple earthworks and later evolved into wooden-earth constructions of two types: grate and case,) and finally built of brick or stone. Many of these brick-and-stone built castles can still be found in Jura Krakowsko-Częstochowska, Mazowsze and in the Świętokrzyskie region.

Grody, castles, and fortified towns were built in Poland from prehistoric times, but the true blossoming of modern castle construction can be observed from the archeological record in the 13th and 14th centuries after the Mongolian invasion. During this time many cities (like Kraków) and towns had to be rebuilt from ashes, and as a result acquired solid, brick walls. This was particularly noticeable during the rule of Kazimierz Wielki, when internal peace and growing wealth of the state allowed the construction of new castles. In the same time period, (especially along the Northern border and in Śląsk) szlachta's strongholds, sometimes in the form of dungeons (pol. stołp) appeared. However, until the 17th century, when such fortresses as Zamość or Kudak were constructed, there were no unconquerable stronghold in Poland.

== Human sources and tactics ==
=== Earliest times ===
In the prehistoric times the main military force of the state consisted of all the grown males subject of a local Władyka. A Władyka was a leader who had enough power to overwhelm previous senior tribal leaders of particular tribes, or who distinguished himself during the war and thanks to it gained hereditary sovereignty. In later times however – with more and more towns and villages – this hereditary ruler, now a duke, began to form his own drużyna. A drużyna became the basic formation of the state. However, to build an army a ruler had to send wici to call to arms a pospolite ruszenie of free landowners, who later transformed into the szlachta. The drużyna was equipped and armed by the duke, but a levy-en-masse went to war armed quite arbitrarily: weapons and armour had to be bought privately or captured in the battle. Hence the weapons of the pospolite ruszenie were quite different in origin and quality; predominately spears and javelins, war axes, bows and maces.

Information about the size of an army at the beginning of Polish statehood comes basically from two written sources: Description of Slavic Territories of Ibrahim ibn Jakub and Chronicles and Deeds of the Dukes or Princes of the Poles of Gall Anonym. The first of these wrote that Mesko, King of the North had 3000 pancerni. According to the second, Polish forces around 1000 AD were much bigger, which may support the theory of escalating militarization of the state during the rule of Bolesław Chrobry. Gall Anonym wrote, that the Prince had at his command:

- from Poznań 1300 pancerni and 4000 shield-warriors
- from Gniezno 1500 pancerni and 5000 shield-warriors
- from Włocławek 800 pancerni and 2000 shield-warriors
- from Giecz 300 pancerni and 2000 shield-warriors

These numbers probably did not refer to the regular army, but to drużyna and pospolite ruszenie, which the Prince could mobilize in the northern part of Poland. Calculations, based on estimated population numbers demonstrate that Bolesław Chrobry was able to call 16-18 thousand men.

The exact number of horse warriors remains unclear. According to one compilation of the "Description of Slavic Lands" Mieszko provided his men with horses, but according to another ...this country lies by the sea in the middle of dense forests, which are difficult to an army to cross, so mentioned Mśko has foot soldiers only.. It is quite possible that mounted soldiers of Mieszko's army were not numerous, or that only the cadre had horses. In the opinion of some historians cavalry units made up 1/3 of the army: about 800 horsemen in proportion to 2400 infantry. Following Gallus Anonimus one can recognize 3900 pancerni as cavalry, and 13 000 shield-warriors as infantry.

=== During the times of Bolesław III Wrymouth ===
The Drużyna of the 12th century no longer formed the nucleus of the army. Instead it became the guard of the ruler; some of magnates had drużynas comparable to that of the Prince. By this time the army consisted of drużyna of the Prince, the detachments of the magnates, and the pospolite ruszenie, whose members came from the former free landowners (now mounted knights), as well as peasant infantry. We know almost nothing about the tactics of those times, or about the human resources.

There were some changes in the armament of soldiers, as the cross bow and heavy hurling weapons appeared. The defensive armament did not change a lot, but generally knights wore conical helmets with nasals and full mail armours. Cavalry was the basic element of the army, which improved the speed of the march: in 1103 Wrymouth's army covered a distance of 330 km (from Głogów to Kołobrzeg) in five days, proving its great mobility.

We do not know how big the army was, but it had to be quite big, since it could wage war on two, or even three different fronts.

=== In the time of Mongol's invasion ===
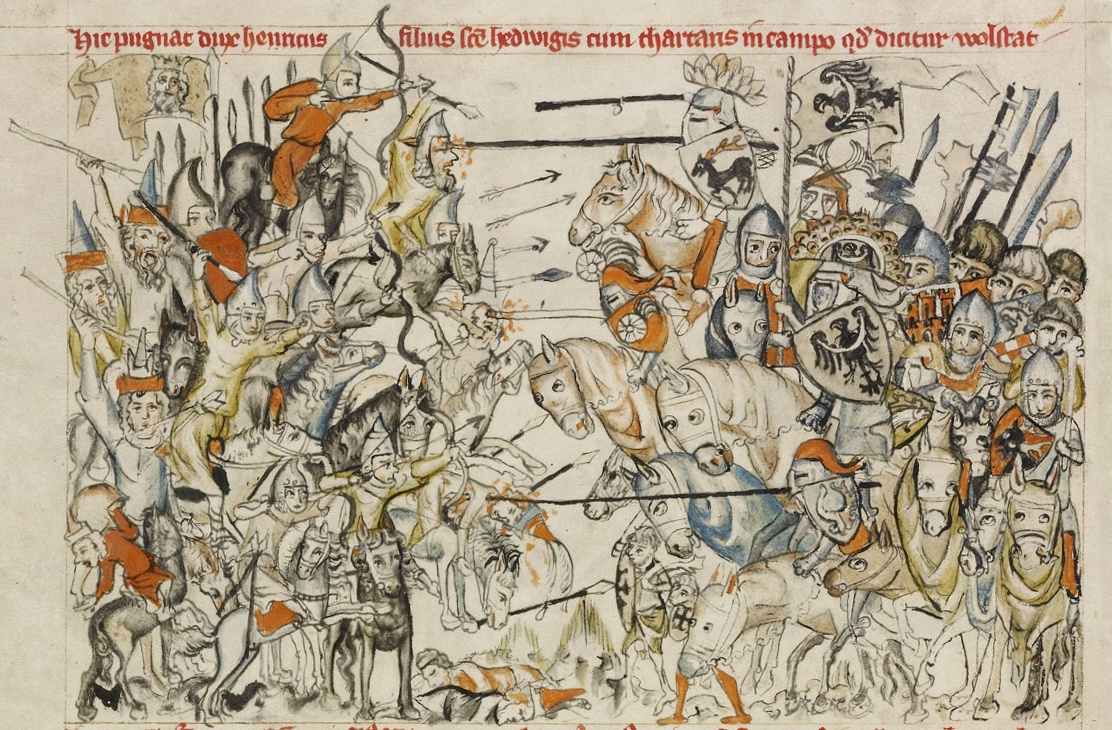
Battle of Legnica, 1241 (miniature of the Picturesque Legend of saint Hedwig of Andechs)

In the 12th century the process of creation of the knighthood began in Poland (and lasted more than a century), which was strictly connected with a tenure of land. In order to recreate the picture of the army of those times, it is essential to know the duties of particular classes of society: military duty, specified works for army's needs duty and services in kind for the army duty. The first type of duty rested mainly in soldiers' hands. The other two were the responsibility of the burghers and (most of) the peasants.

This period is - as the previous one - little understood, but the Battle of Legnica has such rich iconography, that it is possible to attempt to make some estimates. Armour of an ordinary soldier changed very little, but eminent knights (including Henry II the Pious) had their hauberks enriched with iron plate elements, and great helms, nicely ornamented. Leszek Czarny, who died in 1288, is depicted on his gravestone in Kraków in full plate armour.

Tactics of the battlefield were not complicated. Knights (along with their squires) stayed in close order formation with infantry on the flanks, and – after the initial shots of bowmen or crossbowmen – started the charge. In the same moment the commander – who was fighting at the head of the main detachment - usually lost control over the army and the battle degenerated into a melée in the scourge and disarray. In such circumstances the possibility of panic was the crucial element of the fight, and the battle - supposedly won - could be lost.

=== In the 14th and 15th centuries ===
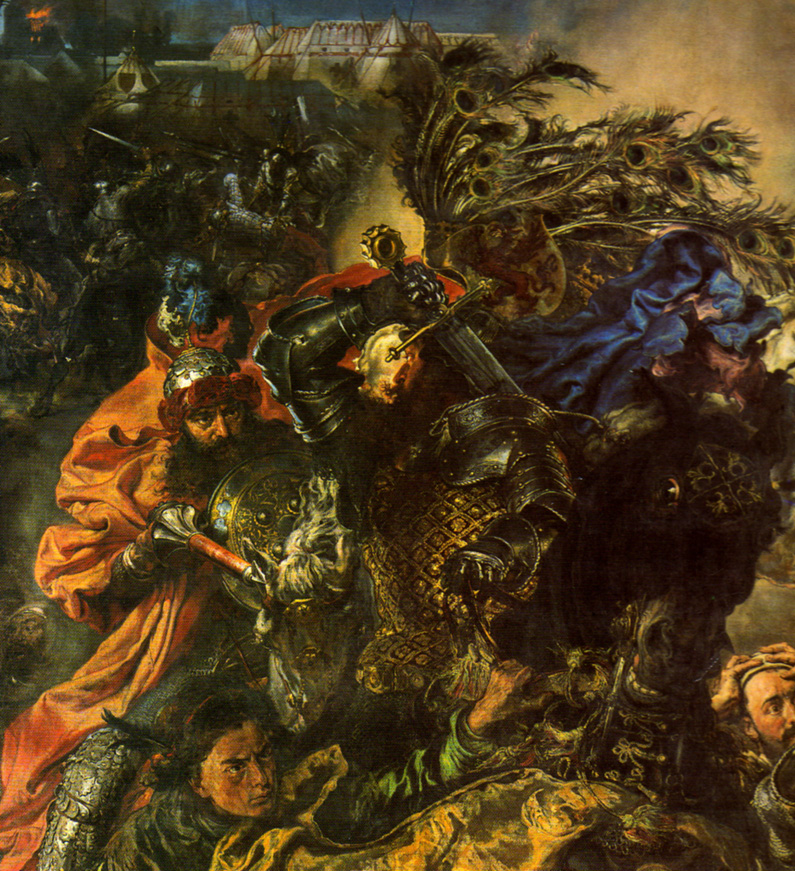
Battle of Grunwald (fragment), by Jan Matejko

The 14th and the beginning of 15th centuries were characterized by fast development of arms, tactics and strategy as well. Knighthood of the Kingdom of Poland strengthened for good, and in the battlefield developed and dominated maneuverability, with full scale outflanking, surrounding, unconventional uses of cavalry and infantry units to surprise the enemy.^{[none]} In those days commanders stayed away from the fight, observing battle from a carefully selected place (mostly at the top of the hill), from where they had a wide view over the surroundings. All detachments were led by known, experienced knights named voyvodes.

Polish army of that period consisted - as before - of knights, burghers, and peasants, with obvious division of labor and specialization: cavalry, infantry, and fortified cities defenders. The knight, along with his lance belonged to his own chorągiew (or rota) of land, clan, or mercenary, and the best warriors were called to lead the chorągiews of the army. Szlachta of moderate means, able to arm and support the lance, enlisted to a chorągiew of a particular land, where knights had their estates. Poorer knights enlisted to the chorągiews created and maintained by magnates, or to a few mercenary royal chorągiews created under king's order by a particular, rich and famous commandander. Infantry was made up of peasants (one of five men of royal villages: four remaining in the village had to equip and arm the fifth). Burghers had to defend their cities, and different guilds were responsible for particular part of the walls' defense. They, as much richer than peasants, were able to get much better armours and weapons: light helmets, mail, or mail-plate armours; in addition they were taught how to fight, for which purpose the shot brotherhoods were created.

The weapon of the knight changed a little: swords were longer, some with long cruciform hilts with grips over 15 cm in length (providing room for two hands), straight double-edged blades often over 90 cm in length, and weigh typically between 1.2 and 1.4 kg (so called longswords or bastards). On the contrary armour transformed significantly. Mail was gradually enriched with iron plates, which covered the most of endangered parts of the body, and in the beginning of 15th century was replaced with full plate armour. Worth to know that the armour was covered with outer garment of tunic form, open at the sides and so usually belted, usually emblazoned with coats of arms, known as tabard. Uncomfortable great helms went out of use, replaced with first visored bascinets, typically fitted with an aventail and hinged visor.

The crossbows of infantry became heavier, and more dangerous for the knights, and the ordinary shield of the past was replaced with the pavise; a high, rectangle shield, from behind which a foot soldier could safely shoot at the enemy. The very last inventions of the 15th century were black powder and cannon. The latter was for the first time used in Poland after the death of king Louis I of Hungary, when followers of one of candidates to the throne besieged their opponents in the castle of Pyzdry in 1383. Bombards of that times, which shot stone projectiles, were quite good against fortifications, but almost useless on the battlefield.^{[d]}

=== In the times of Jagiellons ===
The most characteristic changes of this period was the appearance – at the side of heavy cavalry – of light horse detachments of hussars and the new pancernis (Armored Companions), as well as a gradual termination of the call of peasants. Burghers kept their privileges to defend their towns, but only three cities in all of Poland had a right to send troops to the battlefield. Another novelty was also the so-called obrona potoczna (later wojsko kwarciane) organized to defend royal lands and – in a general sense – the whole territory of the state against incursions from the East.

Also the armament has been changed. The heavy cavalryman's armour (of both knight and horse) was thicker, and heavier, but weapons remained the same. In the same time light cavalryman dropped out the armour at all (like first hussars) or stayed with the mail (like pancerni). The novelty was personal fire weapon of the soldier, as pistol and arquebus, soon replaced by musket. The infantry of that times was formed of the mercenary regiments of "foreign style" (pol. cudzoziemskiego autoramentu), or of the "field infantry" (pol. piechota łanowa) recruited from peasants.

The gunpowder domination of the battlefield became almost complete in Europe. Armour, of little use against either small arms or artillery fire, was gradually disappearing, but not everywhere: in the nearest future light hussars of the battle of Orsha would eventually wore heavier breastplates, helmets, gorgets, and forearm pieces.

== List of the most important battles ==
Early Middle Ages
Battle of Cedynia	972
Battle of the Spree	1005
Siege of Niemcza	1017
Battle of Kijów (Kyiv, also Kiev)	1018
Battle of Drzycim	1091
Battle of Głogów	1109
Battle of Psie Pole	1109
Battle of Sajó River	1132
Transitional Period
Battle of Mozgawa	1195
Battle of Zawichost	1205
Battle of Chmielnik	1241
Battle of Legnica	1241
Battle of Stolec	1277
Battle of Goźlice	1280
Battle of Płowce	1331
Late Middle Ages
Battle of Vorskla River	1399
Battle of Grunwald	1410
Battle of Koronowo	1410
Battle of Wilkomierz	1435
Battle of Grotniki	1439
Battle of Varna	1444
Battles of the Thirteen Years' War
Battle of Chojnice	1454
Battle of Iława	1455
Battle for Kneiphof	1455
Battle of Ryn	1456
Battle of Bornholm	1457
Battle of Sępopole	1457
Battle of Pruszcz Gdański	1460
Battle of Świecino	1462
Battle of Vistula Lagoon	1463
Battle of Kletsk	1506
Battle of Orsha	1514

== See also ==
- Military of the Polish-Lithuanian Commonwealth

== Notes ==
a Due to fluctuations of the borders and almost instant gains and losses of – sometimes large – territories

b There were 18 000 Polish cavalrymen, each of them with at least two horses

c Such surprising maneuver in the Battle of Grunwald was keeping part of Polish troops in the woods

d Ex. according to Jan Długosz (The Annals..., ISBN 1-901019-00-4) bombards were used in the beginning of the Battle of Grunwald, but without any significant effect
