= Military of the Kingdom of Poland =

Military of the Kingdom of Poland can refer to:

- Military of the Kingdom of Poland, used during warfare in Medieval Poland during the Piast and Jagiellon dynasties (10th–16th centuries)
- Military of the Polish-Lithuanian Commonwealth
- Military of the Congress Kingdom of Poland
