= WICI =

Wici may refer to:

- The formal call letters of a South Carolina Radio Station WWBD.
- Wici (call to arms), a medieval way of calling men to arms in Poland.
- Women in Communications, Inc., former name of trade group Association for Women in Communications

== See also ==
- Wiki (disambiguation)
