= Śląska Ochla =

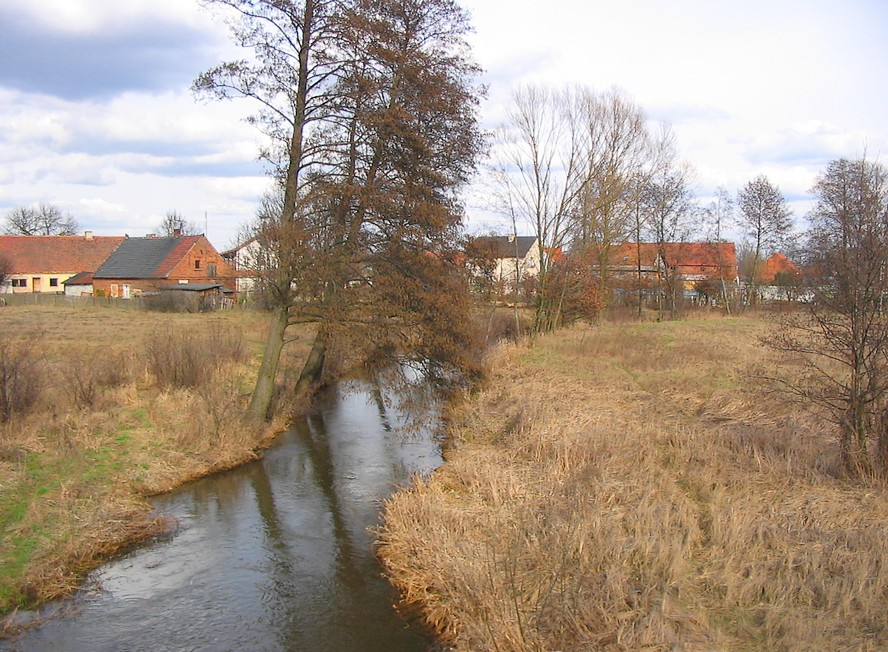

Location
- Country: Poland

Physical characteristics
- Mouth
  - location: Oder
  - coordinates: 51°53′54″N 15°45′46″E

Basin features
- Progression: Oder→ Baltic Sea

Śląska Ochla is a river in Poland with a length of 40.81 km. It flows into the Oder from the left near Bobrowniki in the close vicinity of the Bukowa Góra Reserve. The river flows in the Lubusz Voivodeship through the Barucko-Głogowska Proglacial Valley. It drains the southern slopes of the Zielona Góra Embankment (it receives several streams draining the southern part of Zielona Góra) Its source is located in the municipality of Świdnica, near the village of Letnica.
