= Battle of the Spree =

1005 battle of the German-Polish War (1003–1018)

- Part of Polish–German Wars (1003–1018)
| Date | 6 September 1005 |
| Location | Spree |
| Result | Inconclusive |

Belligerents
| Duchy of Poland | Holy Roman Empire |

Commanders and leaders
| Bolesław I | Henry II; Thiedbern † |

The Battle of the Spree was a battle part of the German–Polish War which took place on 6 September 1005 between the Duchy of Poland and the Holy Roman Empire led by Henry II. It ended up Inconclusive.

== Prelude ==
Despite his successes, Henry II did not achieve all his goals, failing to regain all the lands occupied by Bolesław I the Brave. Therefore, he announced the next expedition into Poland in August 1005, summoning his vassals under royal sanction.

Bolesław, expecting this expedition, made plans to fortify Lusatia as much as possible, knowing it'd be the main target. This area was also defended by marshes on the Spree river. The main defense line stretched along the Oder and Bóbr rivers, and the main point of resistance was to be Krosno, where the most convenient point for crossing was located. It was also secured to make it more difficult for the Germans.

== Battle ==
Even though Bolesław I had given orders to the invaders to slow down their match, they ignored it and kept going further into Polish land, crossing swamps on the Spree and moving towards Krosno near the Oder.

The German army is said to have set up camp on the Spree river. Thiedbern (knight) learned that the Poles were going to attack their army from the side, prompting him to gather his best knights. He decided to then approach the enemy and destroy him by deception. However, the enemy had managed to escape into densely cut trees, harassing the Germans from there even more.

Thiedbern had shot his arrows, killing many and then plundering the place. This all happened on the 6th of September and caused great pain to both the king and his surroundings. Some sources say that Bolesław felt remorseful about this.

== See also ==
- List of wars involving Poland
- List of wars involving Germany

== Cited sources ==
- J. Strzelczyk: Bolesław Chrobry. WBP, Poznań, 1999.
