= Battle of Cedynia =

972 battle between Mieszko I of Poland and Odo I of Lusatia

Coordinates: 52°52′N 14°12′E

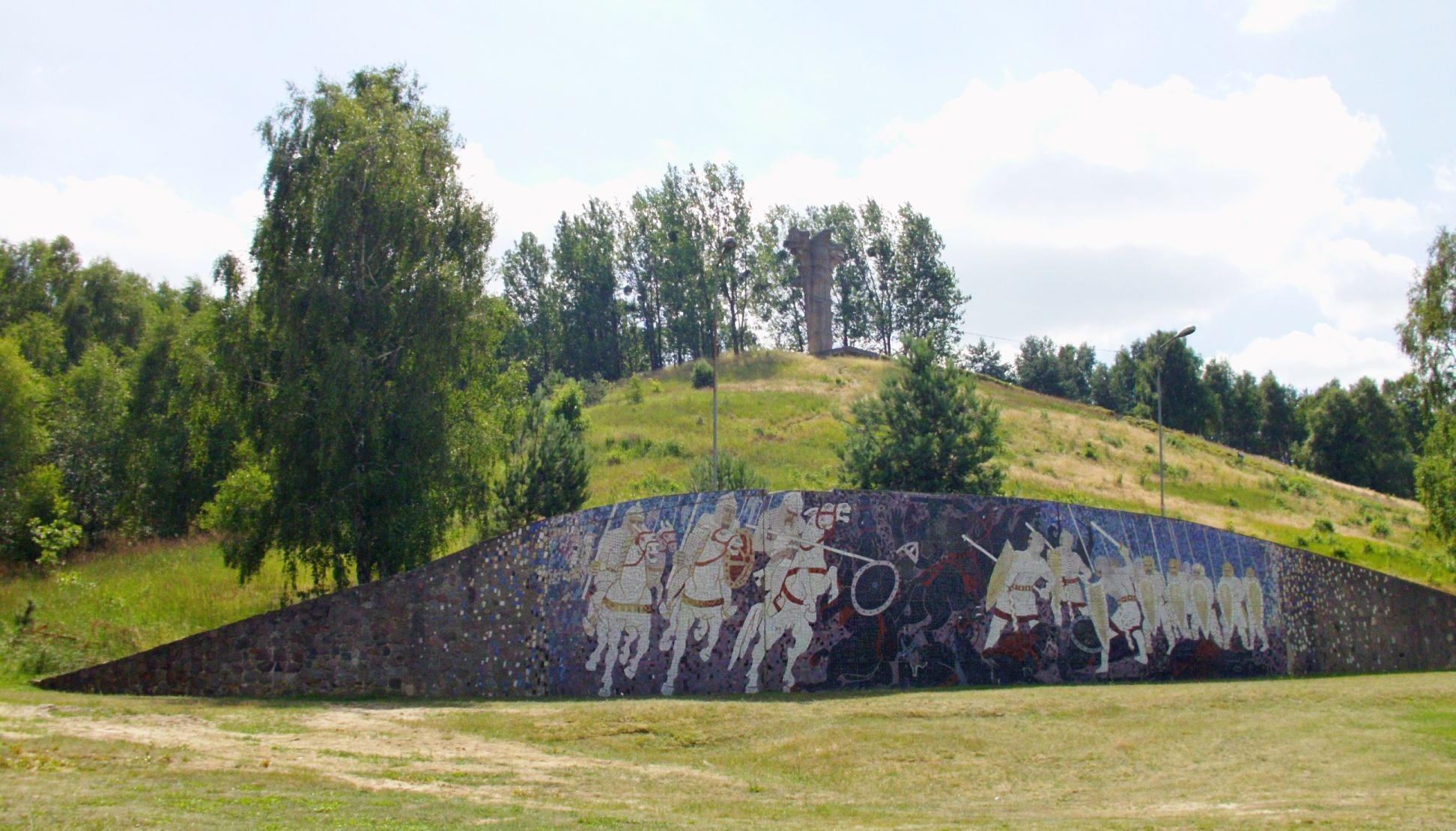
- Monument to the Battle of Cedynia
Date	24 June 972
Location	Cedynia, present-day Poland
Result	Polish victory

Belligerents
Duchy of Poland	Saxon Eastern March

Commanders and leaders
Mieszko I of Poland; Prince Czcibor	Odo I, Margrave of the Saxon Ostmark

Strength
c. 4,000	c. 3,000 infantrymen 1,000–1,300 cavalrymen

Casualties and losses
Light	Heavy

The Battle of Cedynia (also known as the Battle of Zehden) was fought on 24 June 972 near the Oder river, when an army led by Mieszko I of Poland defeated the forces of the Saxon margrave Hodo (or Odo I of Lusatia). Whether the battle actually took place near the modern-day town of Cedynia is disputed in modern scholarship.

Mieszko I, Poland's first documented ruler based in Greater Poland, had successfully campaigned in the Cedynia area, then a West Slavic tribal territory also coveted by Holy Roman Emperor Otto I and German nobles. While Mieszko's differences with Otto I were settled by an alliance and payment of tribute to the latter, the nobles whom Otto I had invested with the former Saxon Eastern March, most notably Odo I, challenged Mieszko's gains. The battle was to determine the possession of the area between Mieszko and Odo. Records of the battle are sparse, it was briefly described by the chronicler Thietmar of Merseburg (975−1018), whose father participated in the battle (Chronicon II.19).

== Background ==
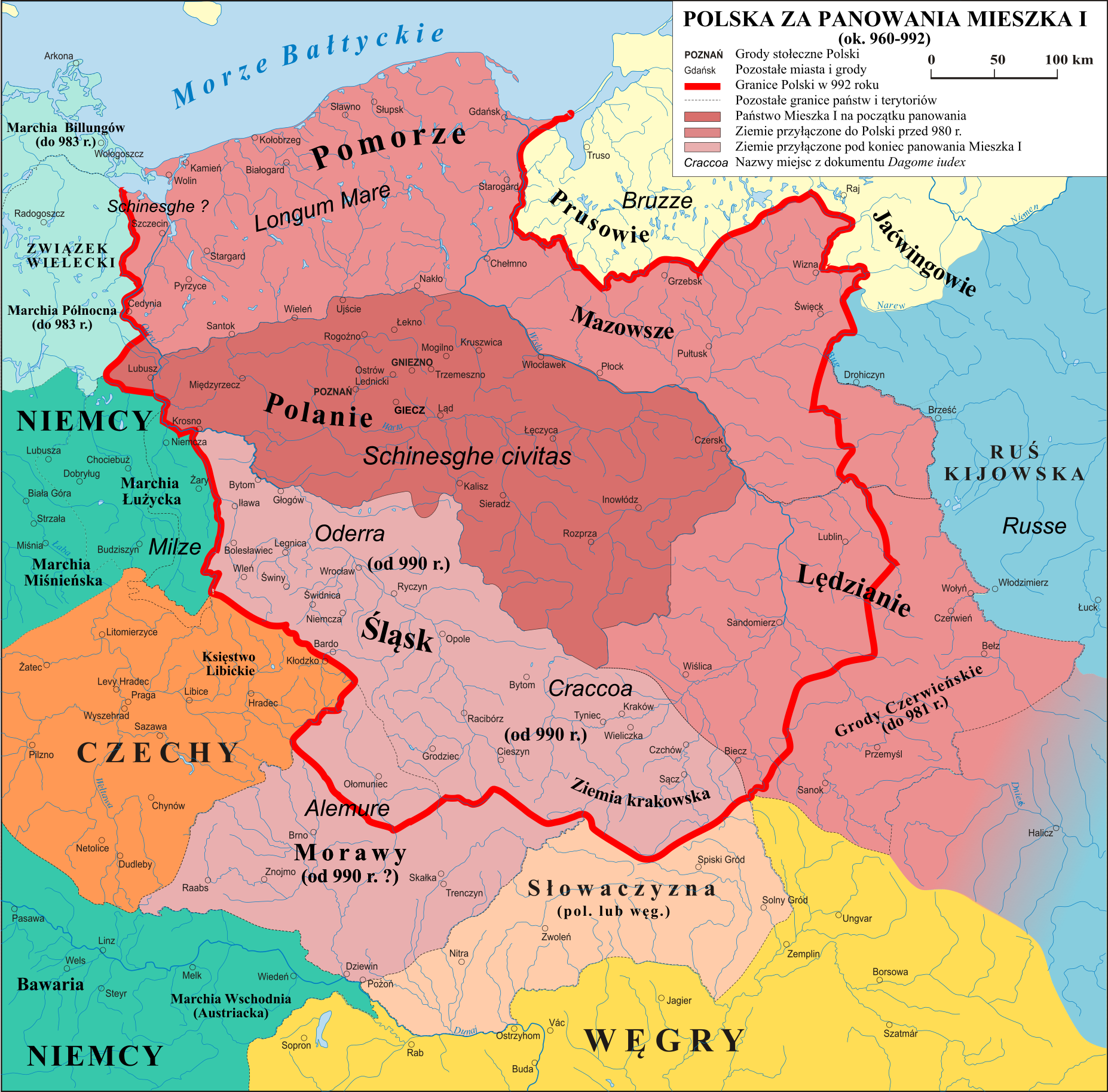
Poland under Mieszko I, 960–992

About 937 the Saxon margrave Gero had conquered vast territories east of the Elbe River, where he subdued the tribes of the Polabian Slavs. The German forces thereby reached the Oder River and the western border of the young Polish country. After several clashes of arms the conflict for the present was settled by an agreement in 963 whereafter Duke Mieszko had to pay a recurrent tribute to Emperor Otto.

Upon Gero's death in 965, his vast Marca Geronis was divided into several smaller marches, while the power in the area was exercised by unchecked warlords. Duke Mieszko took the occasion to capture the lightly defended and economically important estuary of the Oder on the Baltic Sea, in order to secure his influence in Pomerania up to Wolin. In turn Odo I had been vested with the Saxon Eastern March (the later March of Lusatia) by Emperor Otto I and was responsible for gathering tribute of the tribes which were Mieszko's point of interest.

The margrave wanted to extend his territory and influence, he finally gathered his forces and decided to attack. He was sure of victory; his raid was a private conflict, against the agreements made by the Emperor, who at the same time struggled to secure his rule in the Kingdom of Italy. However, against Odo's expectations, the battle was won by Mieszko.

== The battle as reported by Thietmar ==
The only more-or-less contemporary account of the battle is chapter 19 of the second book of Thietmar of Merseburg's Chronicon, consisting of three sentences:

original text	English translation
Interea Hodo, venerabilis marchio, Miseconem, inperatori fidelem tributumque usque in Vurta fluvium solventem, exercitu petivit collecto. Ad cujus auxilium pater meus comes Sigifridus, tunc juvenis necdumque conjugali sociatus amori, venit solum cum suis, et in die sancti Johannis Baptistae adversus eum pugnantes, primoque vincentes, a fratre ejusdem Cideburo, exceptis tantum comitibus prefatis, omnes optimi milites interfecti oppecierunt in loco, qui vocatur Cidini. Hac de fama miserabili inperator turbatus, de Italia nuncios misit, precipientes Hodoni atque Miseconi, si gratiam suimet habere voluissent, usque dum ipse veniens causam discuteret, in pace permanerent.	Meanwhile, the honorable margrave Hodo [Odo I] attacked duke Miseco [Mieszko I], who loyally paid tribute to the Emperor [Otto I] for the lands up to the Vurta [Warta, Warthe], with an army. To his aid came alone my [Thietmar's] father lord Sigifrid [Siegfried von Walbeck], then an unmarried juvenile, with his [men], and on the day of John the Baptist [24 June] they fought against him [Miesko]; they were victorious at first, but then his [Miesko's] brother Cidebur [Czcibor], except for the aforementioned great lords [Odo and Siegfried], slew all the best warriors at the site called Cidini [Cedynia, Zehden]. Disturbed by this miserable story, from Italy the emperor sent orders to Hodo but also Miseco, that by his graciousness, until he arrived himself to investigate the case, they were to remain peaceful.

== Aftermath ==
After Emperor Otto I returned to Germany, he mediated a truce between the belligerents at the Hoftag diet of 973 in Quedlinburg, according to which Mieszko was obliged to transfer his minor son Bolesław as a hostage to the Imperial court. Nevertheless, the Emperor died a few weeks later and the conflict with the Saxon margraves continued to smoulder. After Mieszko had interfered in the conflict of Otto's son and successor Emperor Otto II with the Bavarian duke Henry the Wrangler, German forces again attacked Poland without success in 979.

The relations with the Empire improved upon Mieszko's marriage with Oda of Haldensleben, daughter of Margrave Dietrich of the Northern March.

== Modern era ==
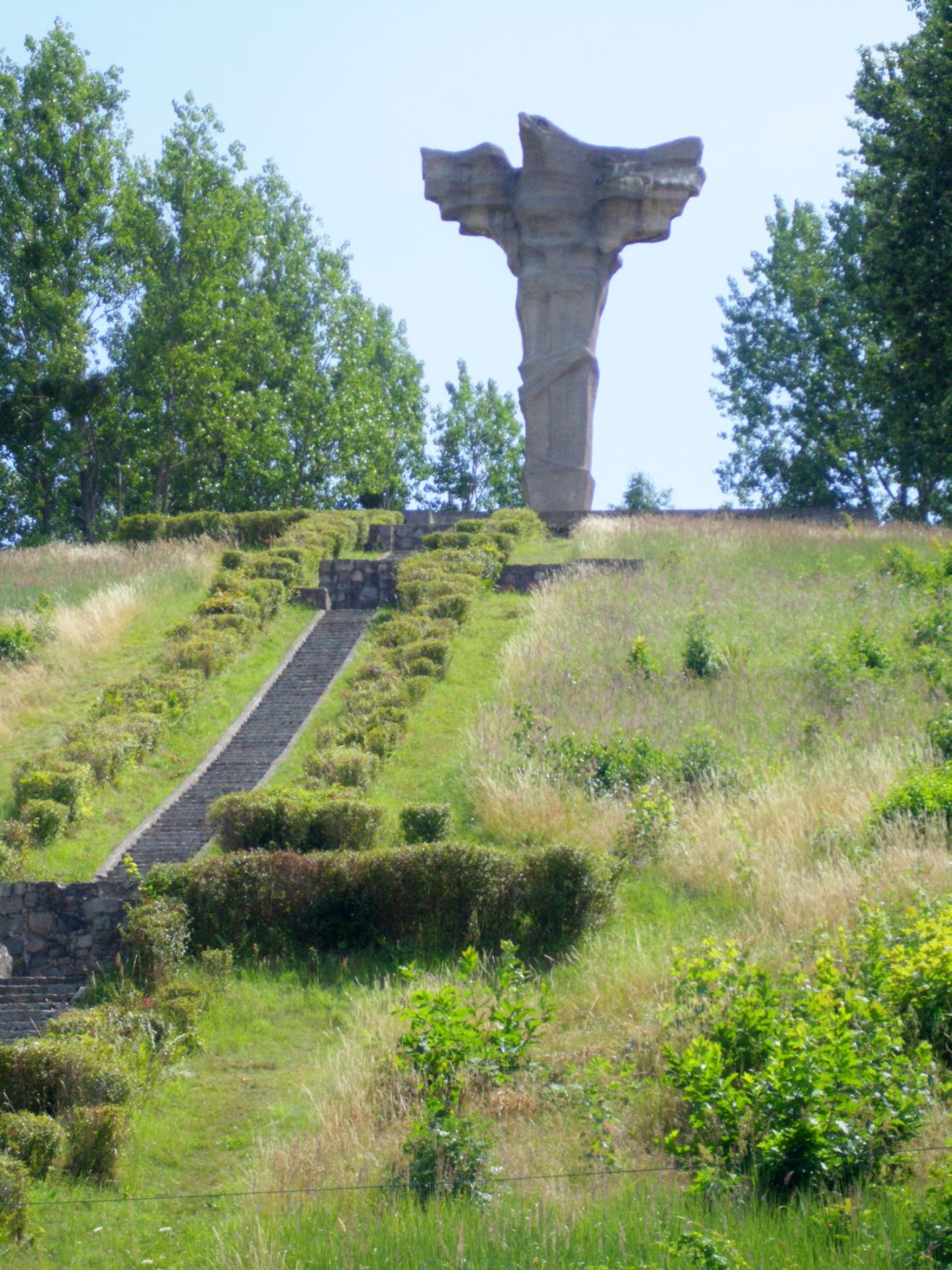
Cedynia monument

In 1945, the implementation of the Oder-Neisse line resulted in the transfer of the town of Zehden from the German province of Brandenburg to the People's Republic of Poland. The town was renamed Cedynia. Contemporary Polish historiography, tasked to justify the post-war borders, turned the encounter of 972 into the first medieval battle between Poles and Germans.

Largely unknown in Poland before World War II, the battle was instrumentalized by post-war Polish propaganda to justify the Oder-Neisse line, which in 1945 made former German Cedynia Poland's westernmost town, and rendered into a German-Polish battle to underline the doctrine of "eternal German-Polish enmity". Several memorials were erected in Cedynia to that effect, including a 15 metres (49 ft) tall concrete statue of a Polish eagle on a sword overseeing town and Oder river from a hilltop. With the fall of Communism, the propagandistic approach was discarded, yet the battle retained some prominence and is included in modern Polish curricula.

Several battle memorials were installed in the small town: walls were covered with mosaics depicting medieval battle scenarios, wooden statues of knights were placed in the town, the hotel was named "Piast" after the dynasty founded by Mieszko I. A hill near the town was converted into the battle memorial "Victory at Cedynia", with a 15 metres (49 ft) tall concrete statue on the hilltop, showing a Polish eagle sitting on a sword rammed in the hill, the face turned west overseeing town and Oder river. The mosaics on the hill's foot show white knights encircling and defeating black knights. The monument was erected in 1972 to commemorate the 1000th anniversary of the battle, which was celebrated in the town by people from all regions of Poland, including high-ranking politicians, and accompanied by a large youth festival, "Cedynia 72".

The lower Oder area, Cedynia and the associated battle in particular, had also played a prominent role in the 1000th anniversary of the Polish state in 1966. The story of the battle was popularized by various means: rallies, monuments, press reports, popular science, travel guides, prosaic and lyrical works, movies, a dedicated medal, post stamps and envelope editions, even special match box designs.

Recent reassessment has resulted in doubts whether the battle had taken place near modern-day Cedynia. According to Pawel Migdalski, "Cedynia has lost its propagandistic value and is now just one of several small border towns". The memory of the battle is now upheld in a non-political fashion, by an annual festival and re-enactments.

The Battle of Cedynia is commemorated on the Tomb of the Unknown Soldier, Warsaw, with the inscription "CEDYNIA 24 VI 972"

== See also ==
- History of Poland
- Battles of Medieval Poland
- Ostsiedlung

== Sources ==
=== Bibliography ===
- Gerstenberg, Julia; Migdalski, Pawel (2008). "Cedynia : eine unscheinbare Stadt am Rande Polens, die alle Polen kennen". In Bernd Vogenbeck (ed.). Terra Transoderana. Zwischen Neumark und Ziema Lubuska. Almanach (in German). Berlin: be.bra Wissenschaftsverlag. pp. 79–85. ISBN 978-3-937233-50-5.
- Korbal, Rafał (1997). Słynne bitwy w historii Polski. Klucz do Ojczyzny (in Polish). ISBN 83-7083-801-4.
- Ranft, Andreas (2006). Der Hoftag in Quedlinburg 973. Von den historischen Wurzeln zum Neuen Europa (in German). Akademie Verlag. ISBN 3-05-004113-7.
