= Łarpia =

Coordinates: 53°33′20″N 14°35′45″E

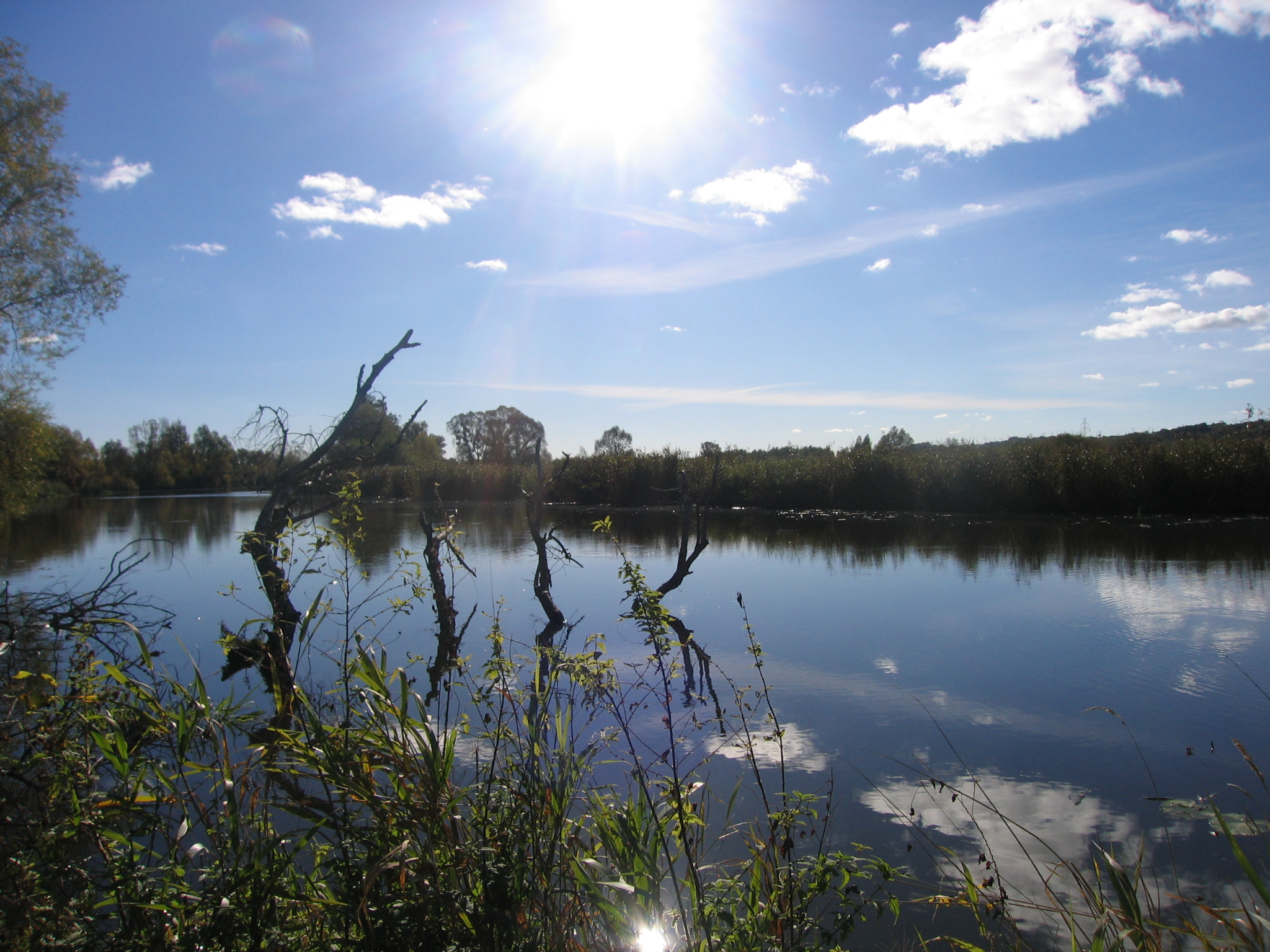

Location
- Country: Poland

Łarpia (German: Larpe) is an eastern branch of Oder in the town of Police, Poland. The name of the river is an origin of the Łarpia Sail Festival.
