= Wici =

Wici (Polish: [ˈvi.t͡si] VEE-chee) was a call to arms in the medieval Poland (Latin: restis), known from prehistoric times. It was a specific method to spread a warning that the country is in danger, and that warriors should immediately go to the nearest commandant's headquarters, where an army attachment would be formed.

It was a simple tuft of osier or garland made of straw (sometimes of rope), delivered to the towns and villages by horse relays from the local administrators (a voivode or a starost) to the subjects of the Crown. Horse messengers threw the wici in the center of a settlement and galloped away to deliver their messages to the other places in the shortest possible time.

Later (possibly in the 15th century) wici was replaced by the letter mustering the pospolite ruszenie.

Sending the wici was described in Librī Īnscrīptiōnum or the "Books of Enrolment" of the Crown Metrica of Poland (Latin: Metrica Rēgnī Poloniae).

Today, although not in common use, the term wici still means in the Polish language a "sudden, important message".
