= Ostrów Grabowski =

Island in Poland

Coordinates: 53°26′N 14°36′E

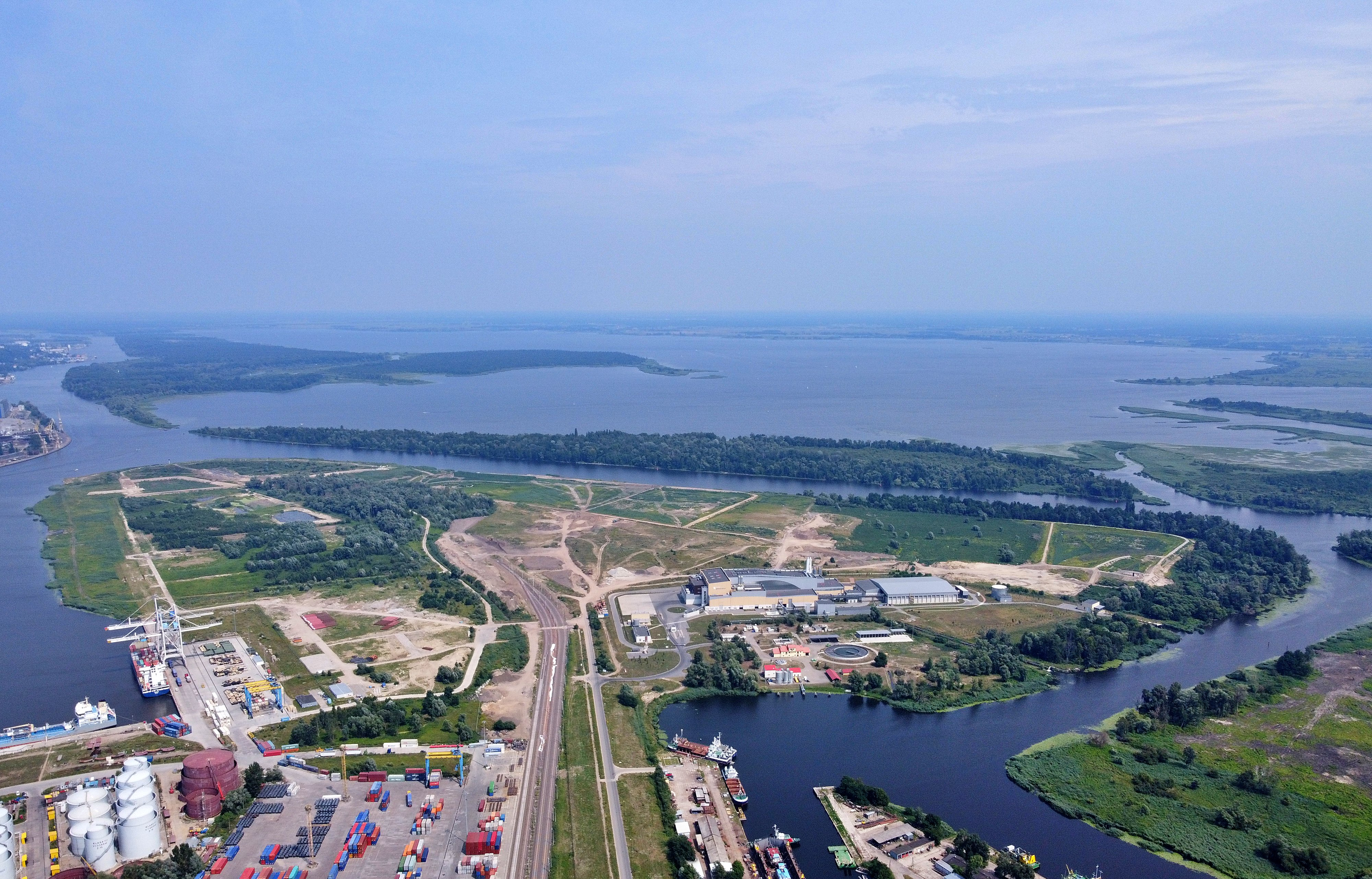

Ostrów Grabowski (pronounced [ˈɔstruf ɡraˈbɔfski]) is a little island on Oder River in Poland, which is placed in Szczecin. The surface of it is approaching 175 ha. Ostrów Grabowski is surrounded by Odra and Duńczyca.
