= Oder =

River in Central Europe

Oder Odra
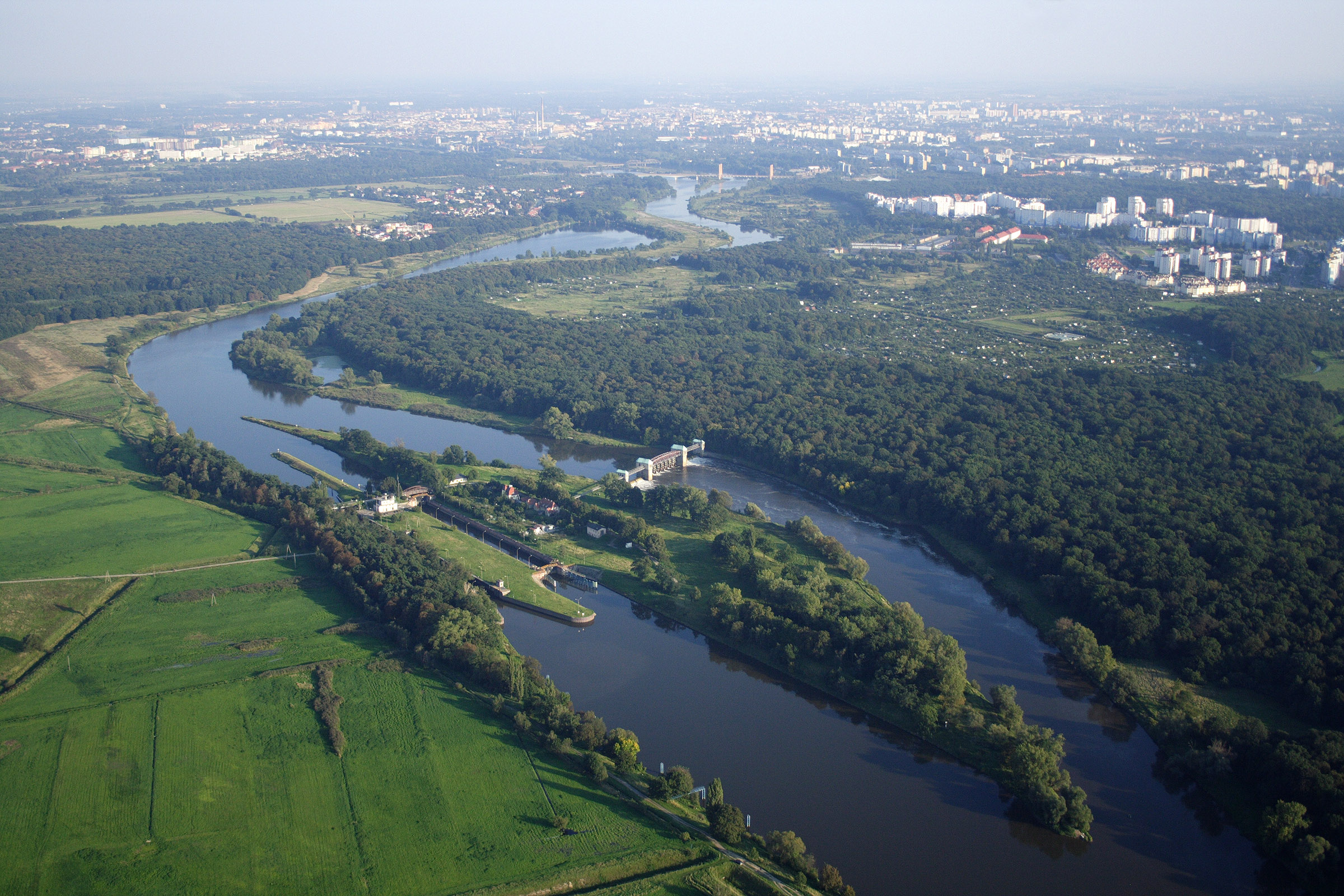
- The Oder in the city of Wrocław, Poland. Rędzin Island before the construction of the Rędzin Bridge.
- Native name: Oder (German); Odra (Polish); Odra (Czech)

Location
- Countries: Czech Republic; Poland; Germany
- Cities: Ostrava; Racibórz; Opole; Brzeg; Wrocław; Głogów; Eisenhüttenstadt; Frankfurt (Oder)/Słubice; Kostrzyn nad Odrą; Schwedt; Szczecin

Physical characteristics
- Source
  - location: Fidlův kopec, Oderské vrchy, Olomouc Region, Czech Republic
  - coordinates: 49°36′47″N 17°31′15″E
  - elevation: 634 m (2,080 ft)
- Mouth: Szczecin Lagoon
  - location: Baltic Sea, Poland
  - coordinates: 53°40′19″N 14°31′25″E
- Length: 840 km (520 mi)
- Basin size: 119,074 km^{2} (45,975 sq mi)
- Discharge
  - location: Mouth
  - average: 567 m^{3}/s (20,000 cu ft/s)

Basin features
- River system: Waterway E70

The Oder (/ˈoʊ.dər/ OH-dər (Note: German pronunciation: [ˈoːdɐ]); Czech and Polish: Odra (Note: Czech pronunciation: [ˈodra], Polish pronunciation: [ˈɔdra].)) is a river in Central Europe. It is Poland's second-longest river and third-longest within its borders after the Vistula and its largest tributary the Warta. The Oder rises in the Czech Republic and flows 742 kilometres (461 mi) through western Poland, later forming 187 kilometres (116 mi) of the border between Poland and Germany as part of the Oder–Neisse line. The river ultimately flows into the Szczecin Lagoon north of Szczecin and then into three branches (the Dziwna, Świna and Peene) that empty into the Bay of Pomerania of the Baltic Sea.

== Names ==
The Oder is known by several names in different languages, but the modern ones are very similar: English and German: Oder; Czech, Polish, and Lower Sorbian: Odra, Upper Sorbian: Wódra; Kashubian: Òdra (pronounced [ˈwɛdra]); Silesian: Ôdra; Medieval Latin: Od(d)era; Renaissance Latin: Viadrus (invented in 1534).

The origin of this name is said by onomastician Jürgen Udolph to come from the Illyrian word *Adra ('water vein").

Ptolemy knew the modern Oder as the Συήβος (Suebos; Latin: Suevus), a name apparently derived from the Suebi, a Germanic people. While he also refers to an outlet in the area as the Οὐιαδούα Ouiadoua (or Οὐιλδούα Ouildoua; Latin Viadua or Vildua), this was apparently the modern Wieprza, as it was said to be a third of the distance between the Suebos and Vistula. The name Suebos may be preserved in the modern name of the Świna river (Swine), an outlet from the Szczecin Lagoon to the Baltic.

== Geography ==
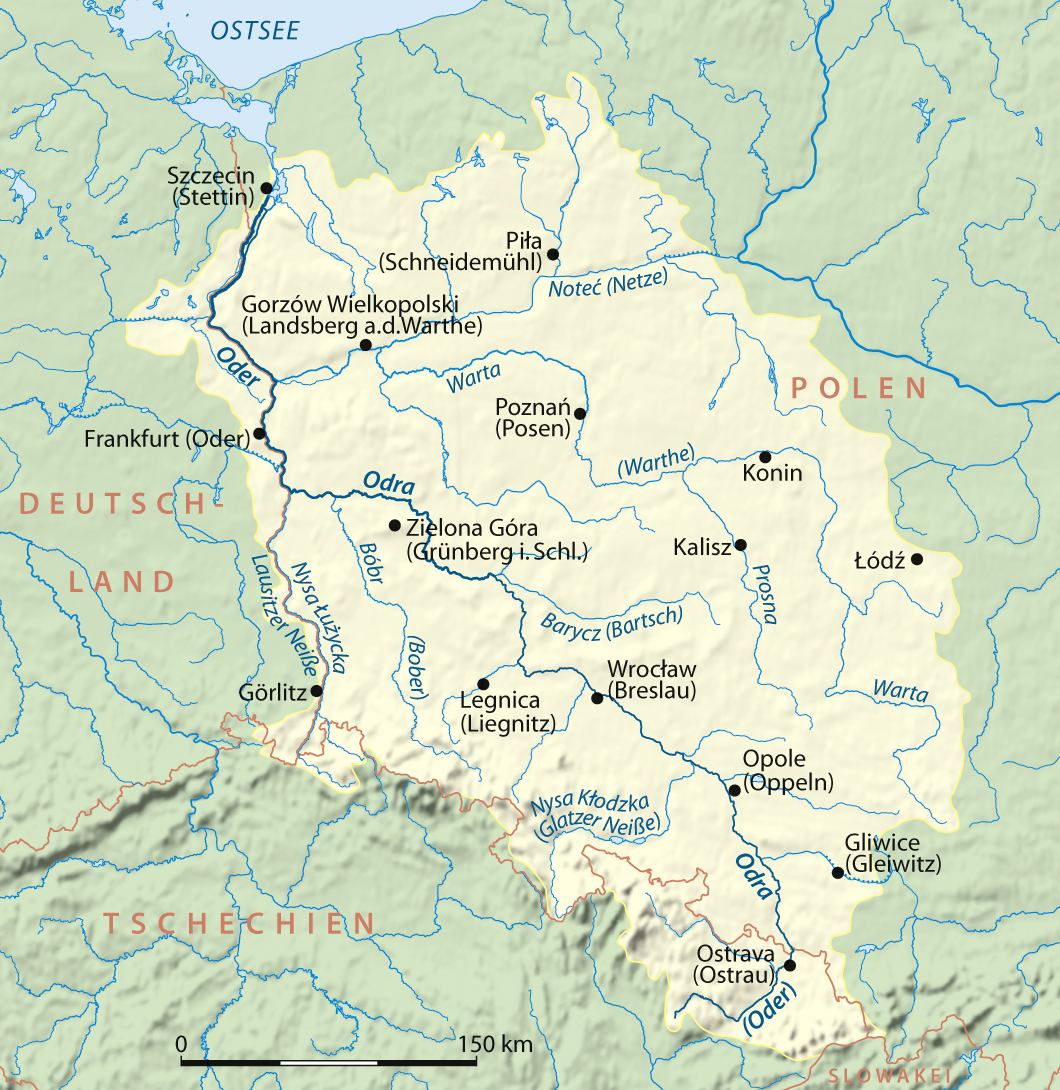
The Oder and its longest tributaries

The Oder is 840 kilometres (522 miles) long: 112 km (70 miles) in the Czech Republic, 726 km (451 miles) in Poland (including 187 km (116 miles) on the border between Germany and Poland). It is the third longest river located within Poland (after the Vistula and Warta); however, it is the second longest river overall taking into account its total length, including parts in neighbouring countries.

The Oder drains a basin of 119,074 square kilometres (45,975 sq mi), 106,043 km^{2} (40,943 sq mi) of which are in Poland (89%), 7,246 km^{2} (2,798 sq mi) in the Czech Republic (6%), and 5,587 km^{2} (2,157 sq mi) in Germany (5%). Channels connect it to the Havel, Spree, Vistula system and Kłodnica. It flows through Silesian, Opole, Lower Silesian, Lubusz, and West Pomeranian voivodeships of Poland and the states of Brandenburg and Mecklenburg-Vorpommern in Germany.

The main branch empties into the Szczecin Lagoon near Police, Poland. The Szczecin Lagoon is bordered on the north by the islands of Usedom (west) and Wolin (east). Between these two islands, there is only a narrow channel (Świna) going to the Bay of Pomerania, which forms a part of the Baltic Sea.

=== Main tributaries ===
The longest tributaries of the Oder are:

Tributary	Length (km)	Side
Warta	808.2	right
Bóbr / Bobr	279	left
Lusatian Neisse	252	left
Eastern Neisse	189	left
Barycz	139	right
Mała Panew	132	right
Opava	129.3	left
Ina	126.0	right
Widawa	109.0	right
Bystrzyca	101.5	left

Other tributaries longer than 30 km
Tributary	Length (km)	Side
Oława	99.0	left
Kaczawa	98.0	left
Myśla	95.6	right
Olza / Olše	89.1	right
Stobrawa	80.3	right
Ślęza	78.6	left
Kłodnica	75.0	right
Krzycki Rów	74.3	right
Płonia	72.6	right
Osobłoga / Osoblaha	65.5	left
Ostravice	64.7	right
Cicha Woda	57.3	left
Pliszka	56.0	right
Bierawka	55.5	right
Ruda	52.3	right
Gowienica	51.1	right
Psina	49.3	left
Obrzyca	49.1	right
Tywa	47.9	right
Rurzyca	44.4	right
Śląska Ochla	40.8	left
Prószkowski Potok	40.8	left
Czarna Struga	40.2	left
Stradunia	37.8	left
Lubina	36.8	right
Zimnica	36.0	left
Jezierzyca	33.6	right
Średzka Woda	32.3	left

=== Cities ===
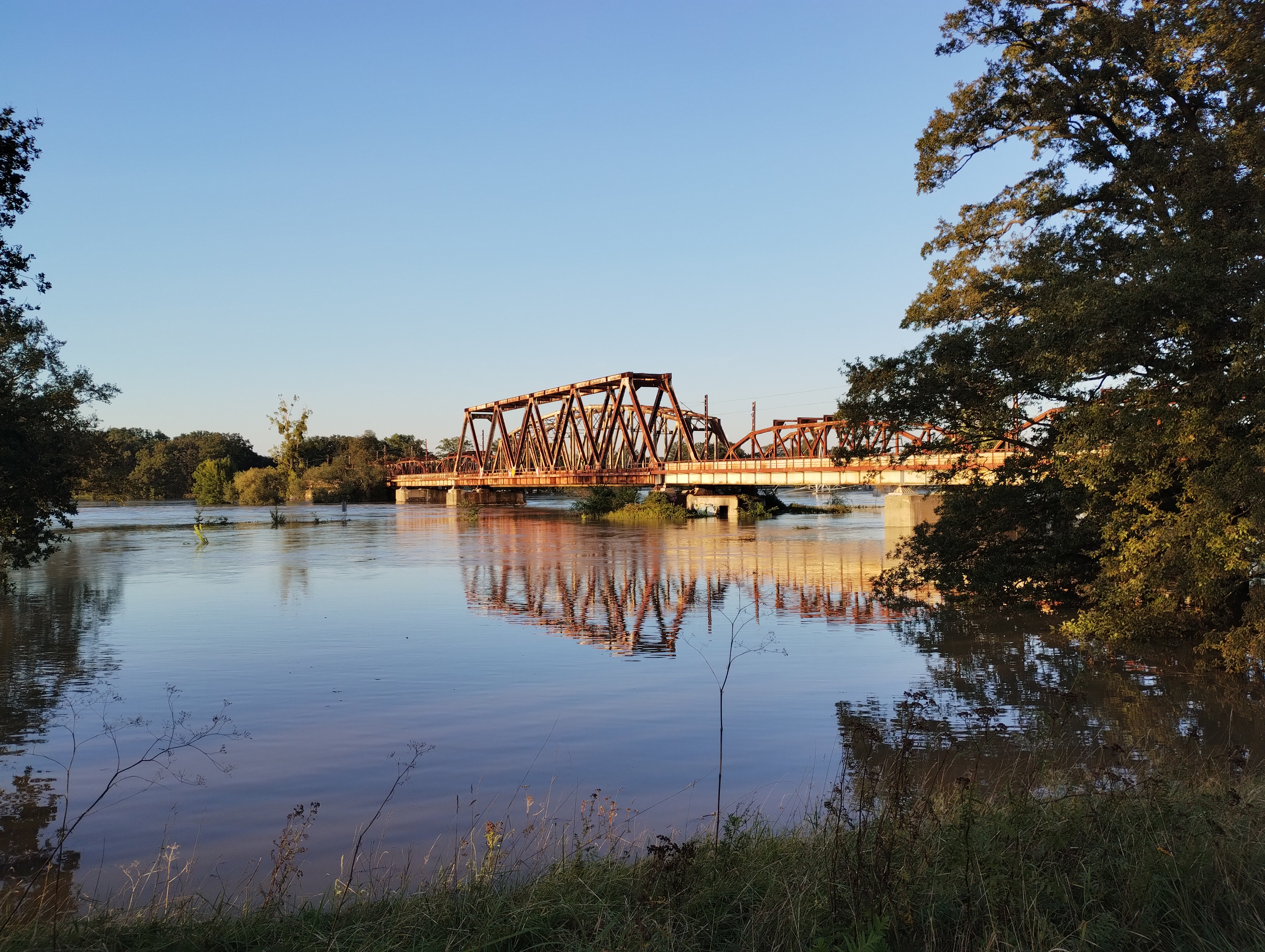
Exceptionally high water level in Brzeg Dolny (September 2024)

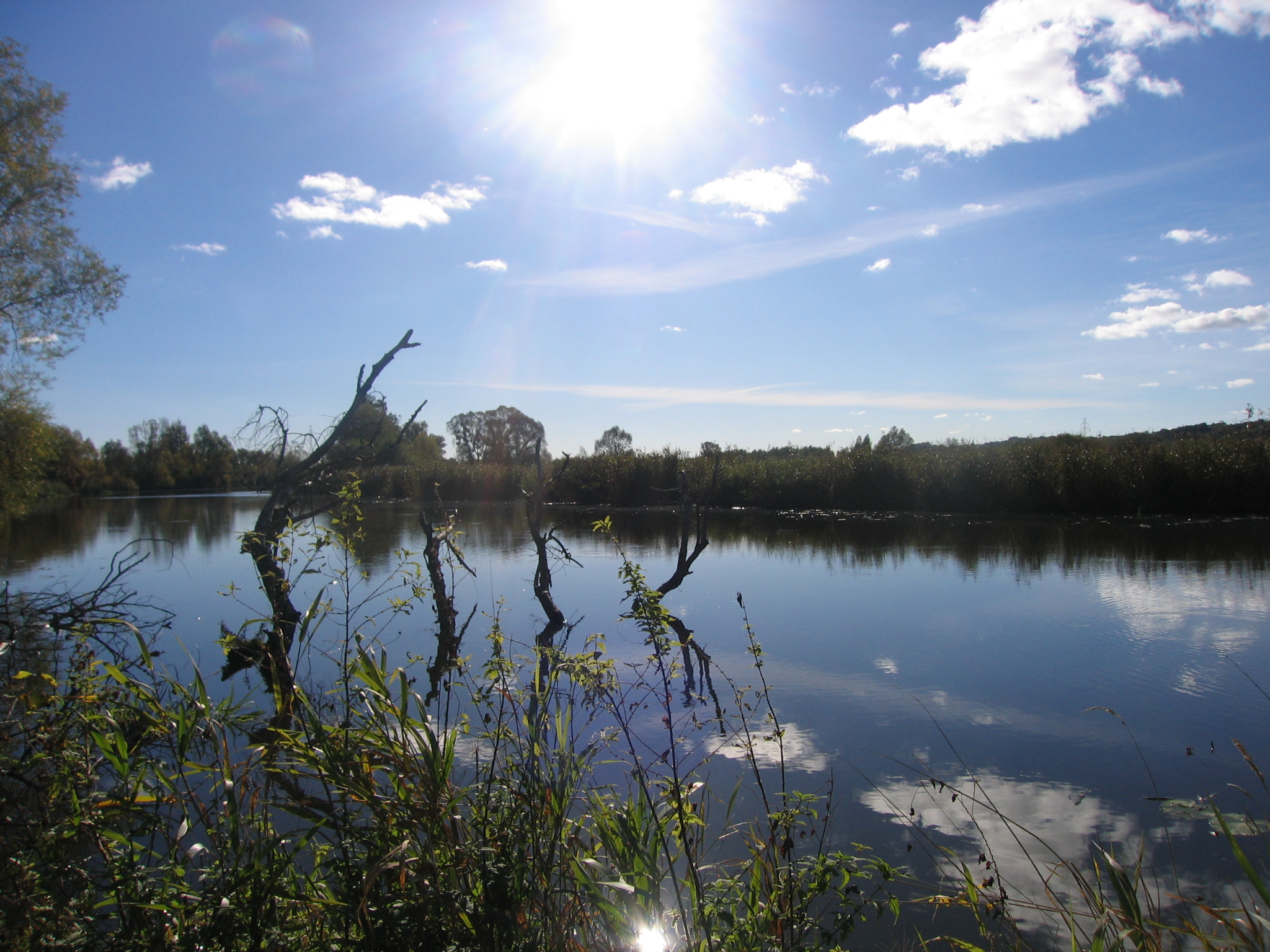
Łarpia, a left distributary of the Oder in Police, Poland

The largest city on the Oder is Wrocław in Lower Silesia.

Main section:

Odry – Ostrava – Bohumín – Racibórz – Kędzierzyn-Koźle – Krapkowice – Opole – Brzeg – Oława – Jelcz-Laskowice – Wrocław – Brzeg Dolny – Ścinawa – Szlichtyngowa – Głogów – Bytom Odrzański – Nowa Sól – Zielona Góra – Krosno Odrzańskie – Eisenhüttenstadt – Frankfurt (Oder) – Słubice – Lebus – Kostrzyn nad Odrą – Cedynia – Schwedt – Gartz – Gryfino – Szczecin – Police

Szczecin Lagoon:

Nowe Warpno – Ueckermünde

east: Dziwna (German: Dievenow) branch (between Wolin Island and mainland Poland):

Wolin – Kamień Pomorski – Dziwnów

middle: Świna (German: Swine) branch (between Wolin and Usedom islands):

Świnoujście

west: Peenestrom (Peene) (Polish: Piana) branch (between Usedom Island and mainland Germany):

Usedom – Lassan – Wolgast

== Navigation ==
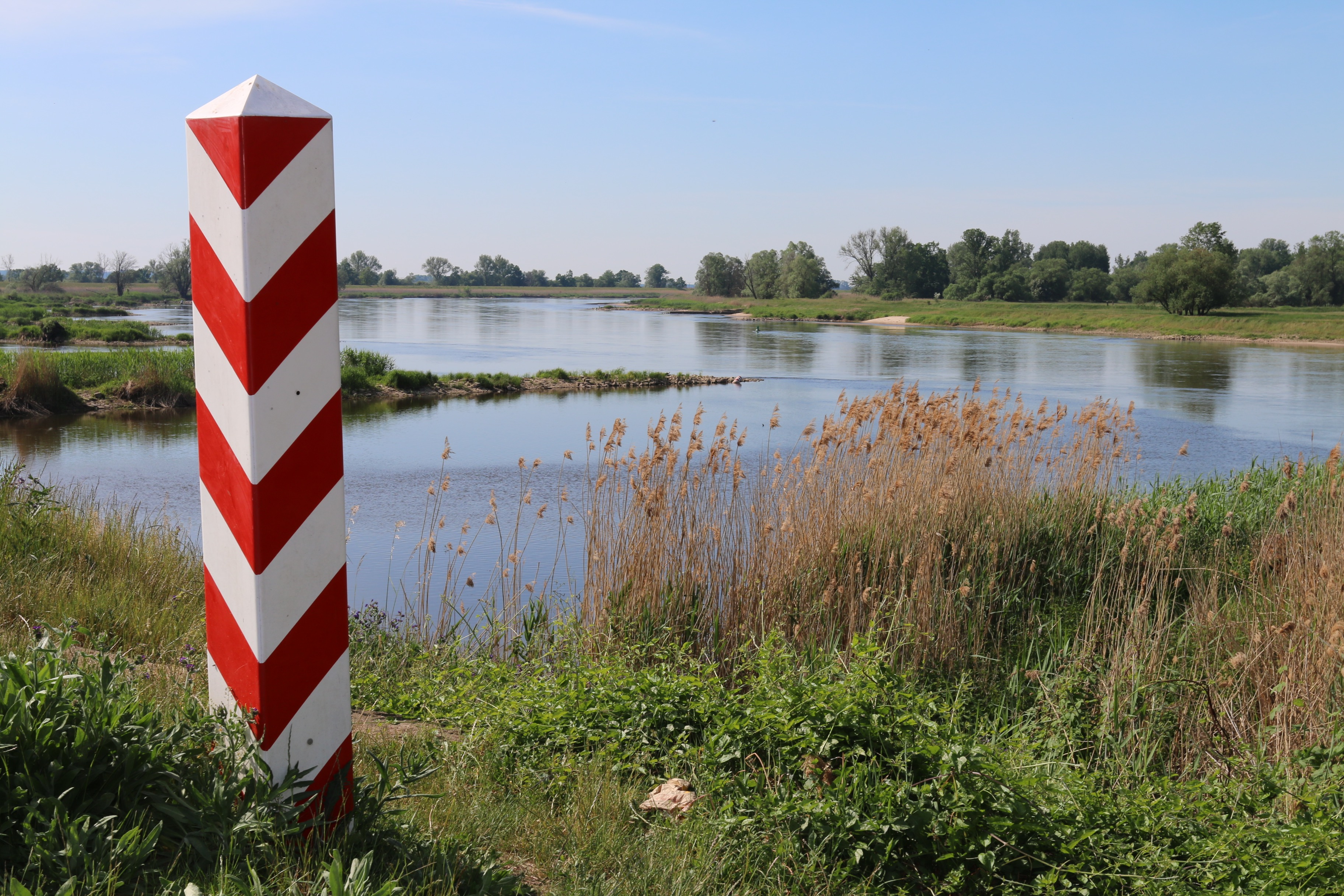
The Oder dividing Poland and Germany seen from the Polish side near Kostrzyn nad Odrą

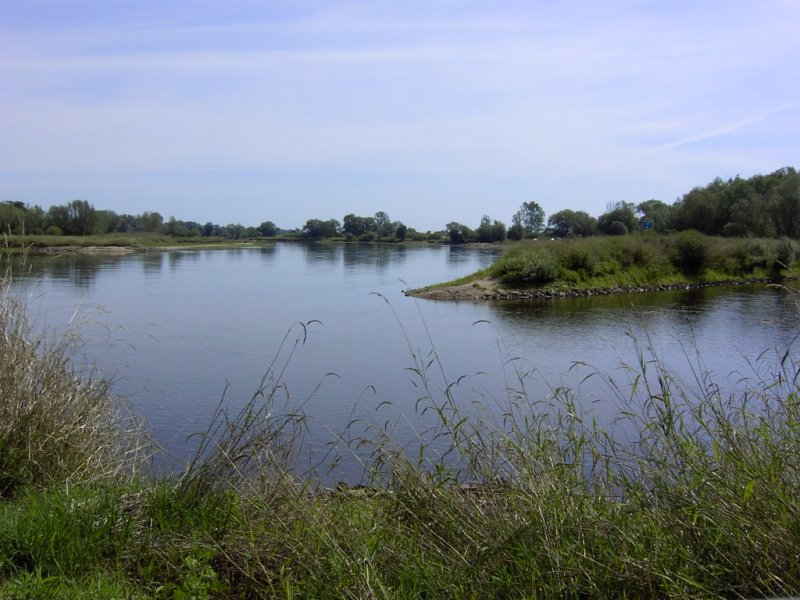
Estuary of the Lusatian Neisse into the Oder

The Oder is navigable over a large part of its total length, as far upstream as the town of Koźle, where the Gliwice Canal connects the river to the city of Gliwice. The upstream part of the river is canalized and permits larger barges (up to CEMT Class IV) to navigate between the industrial sites around the Wrocław area.

Further downstream the river is free-flowing, passing the towns of Eisenhüttenstadt (where the Oder–Spree Canal connects the river to the Spree in Berlin) and Frankfurt upon the Oder. Downstream of Frankfurt the river Warta forms a navigable connection with Poznań and Bydgoszcz for smaller vessels. At Hohensaaten the Oder–Havel Canal connects with the Berlin waterways again.

Near its mouth the Oder reaches the city of Szczecin, a major maritime port. The river finally reaches the Baltic Sea through the Szczecin Lagoon and the river mouth at Świnoujście.

== History ==
Under Germania Magna, the river was known to the Romans as the Viadrus or Viadua in Classical Latin, as it was a branch of the Amber Road from the Baltic Sea to the Roman Empire. In Germanic languages, including English, it was, and still is called the Oder, written in medieval Latin documents as Odera or Oddera. Most notably, it was mentioned in the Dagome iudex, which described territory of the Duchy of Poland under Duke Mieszko I in A.D. 990, as a part of Poland's western frontier, however, in most sections the border ran west of the river.

Before Slavs settled along its banks, the Oder was an important trade route, and towns in Germania were documented along with many tribes living between the rivers Albis (Elbe), Oder, and Vistula. Centuries later, after Germanic tribes, the Bavarian Geographer (ca. 845) specified the following West Slavic peoples: Sleenzane, Dadosesani, Opolanie, Lupiglaa, and Golensizi in Silesia and Wolinians with Pyrzycans in Western Pomerania. A document of the Bishopric of Prague (1086) mentions Zlasane, Trebovyane, Poborane, and Dedositze in Silesia.

In the 10th century, almost the entire course of the Oder River found itself within the borders of the newly formed Polish state, with the exception of the area around the source of the river, which was under Bohemian rule. Several important cities of medieval Poland developed along the Oder, including Opole which became the capital of Upper Silesia, Wrocław which became the capital of Lower Silesia, and one of the main cities of the entire Kingdom of Poland (Latin: sedes regni principales), and Lubusz (now Lebus) which became the capital of the Lubusz Land, nicknamed "the key to the Kingdom of Poland" in medieval chronicles. Wrocław and Lubusz became seats of some of the oldest Catholic bishoprics of Poland, founded in 1000 (Wrocław) and 1125 (Lubusz). Located near the mouth of the river, Szczecin became one of the main cities and ports of the Pomerania region and the entire southern coast of the Baltic Sea.

From the 13th century on, the Oder valley was central to German Ostsiedlung, making the towns on its banks German-speaking over the following centuries. Over time, control over parts of the river was taken from Poland by other countries, including the Margraviate of Brandenburg and the Kingdom of Bohemia, and later also by Hungary, Sweden, Prussia and Germany.

=== Canals and waterway modifications ===
The Finow Canal, first built in 1605, connects the Oder and Havel. After the completion of the more straight Oder – Havel Canal in 1914, its economic relevance decreased.

The earliest important undertaking to modify the river to improve navigation was initiated by Frederick the Great, who recommended diverting the river into a new and straight channel in the swampy tract known as Oderbruch near Küstrin (Kostrzyn nad Odrą). The work was carried out in the years 1746–53, a large tract of marshland being brought under cultivation, a considerable detour cut off and the mainstream successfully confined to a canal.

In the late 19th century, three additional alterations were made to the waterway:

- The canalization of the mainstream at Breslau (Wrocław), and from the confluence of the Glatzer Neisse to the mouth of the Klodnitz Canal (Kłodnica Canal), a distance of over 50 miles (80 km). These engineering works were completed in 1896.
- In 1887–1891 the Oder–Spree Canal was made to connect the two rivers.
- The deepening and regulation of the mouth and lower course of the stream.

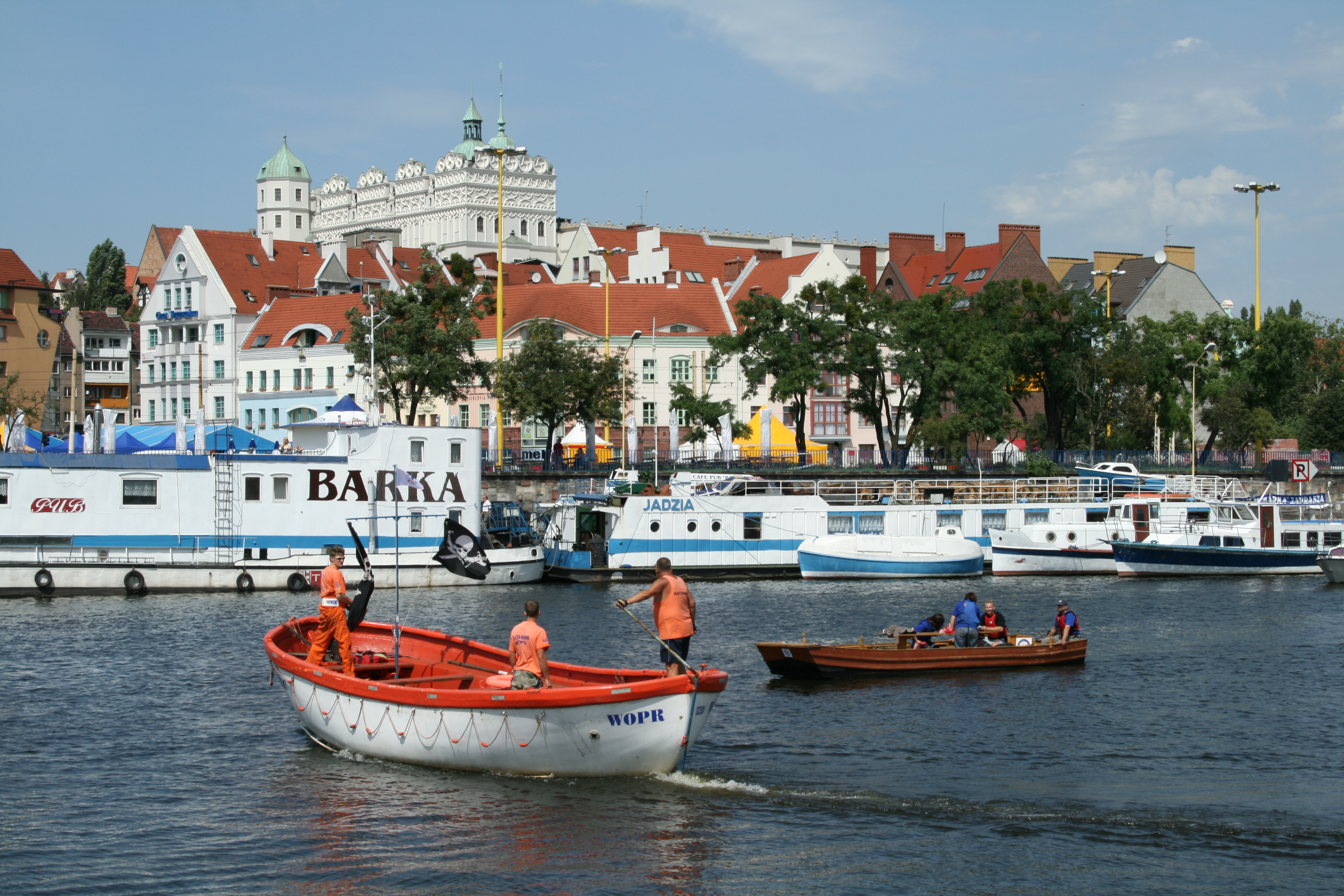
The Oder in Szczecin, Poland, flows along the banks of the Old Town and the Ducal Castle

=== Conditions in the Treaty of Versailles ===
By the Treaty of Versailles, navigation on the Oder became subject to International Commission of the Oder. Following the articles 363 and 364 of the Treaty Czechoslovakia was entitled to lease in Stettin (now Szczecin) its own section in the harbor, then called Tschechoslowakische Zone im Hafen Stettin. The contract of lease between Czechoslovakia and Germany, and supervised by the United Kingdom, was signed on 16 February 1929, and would end in 2028. However, after 1945, Czechoslovakia did not regain this legal position, de facto abolished in 1938–39.

=== 1943 Border with Germany ===
At the 1943 Tehran Conference the Allies decided that the new eastern border of Germany would run along the Oder. After World War II, the former German areas east of the Oder and the Lusatian Neisse passed to Poland by decision of the victorious Allies at the Potsdam Conference (at the insistence of the Soviets). As a result, the so-called Oder–Neisse line formed the border between the Soviet occupation zone (from 1949 East Germany) and Poland. The final border between Germany and Poland was to be determined at a future peace conference. A part of the German population east of these two rivers was evacuated by the Nazis during the war or fled from the approaching Red Army. After the war, the remaining 8 million Germans were expelled from these territories by the Polish and Soviet administrations. East Germany confirmed the border with Poland under Soviet pressure in the Treaty of Zgorzelec in 1950. West Germany, after a period of refusal, confirmed the inviolability of the border in 1970 in the Treaty of Warsaw. In 1990 newly reunified Germany and the Republic of Poland signed a treaty recognizing the Oder–Neisse line as their border.

=== 2022 environmental disaster ===
On 11 August 2022, it was discovered that the Oder river had been contaminated and at least 135 tonnes of dead fish washed up on its shores. Water samples taken on 28 July indicated possible mesitylene contamination, although the toxin was not present in samples taken after 1 August.

=== 2024 environmental crisis ===
On 18 December 2024, Czech media reported about a new environmental crisis as hundreds of fish were found dead in the river. This started talks about a possible toxic pollution. Environmental experts along with firefighters were called to take urgent action in order to identify the sources and prevent further contamination.

== See also ==
- List of rivers of Germany
- List of rivers of Poland
- Lower Oder Valley National Park
- Oder–Neisse line
- Odra Wodzisław
- Ostrów Grabowski, a river island in Szczecin
- City Barrage, Wrocław
- Bartoszowice Barrage
