= National road 6 (Poland) =

National road in Poland

National Road 6
- Droga krajowa nr 6
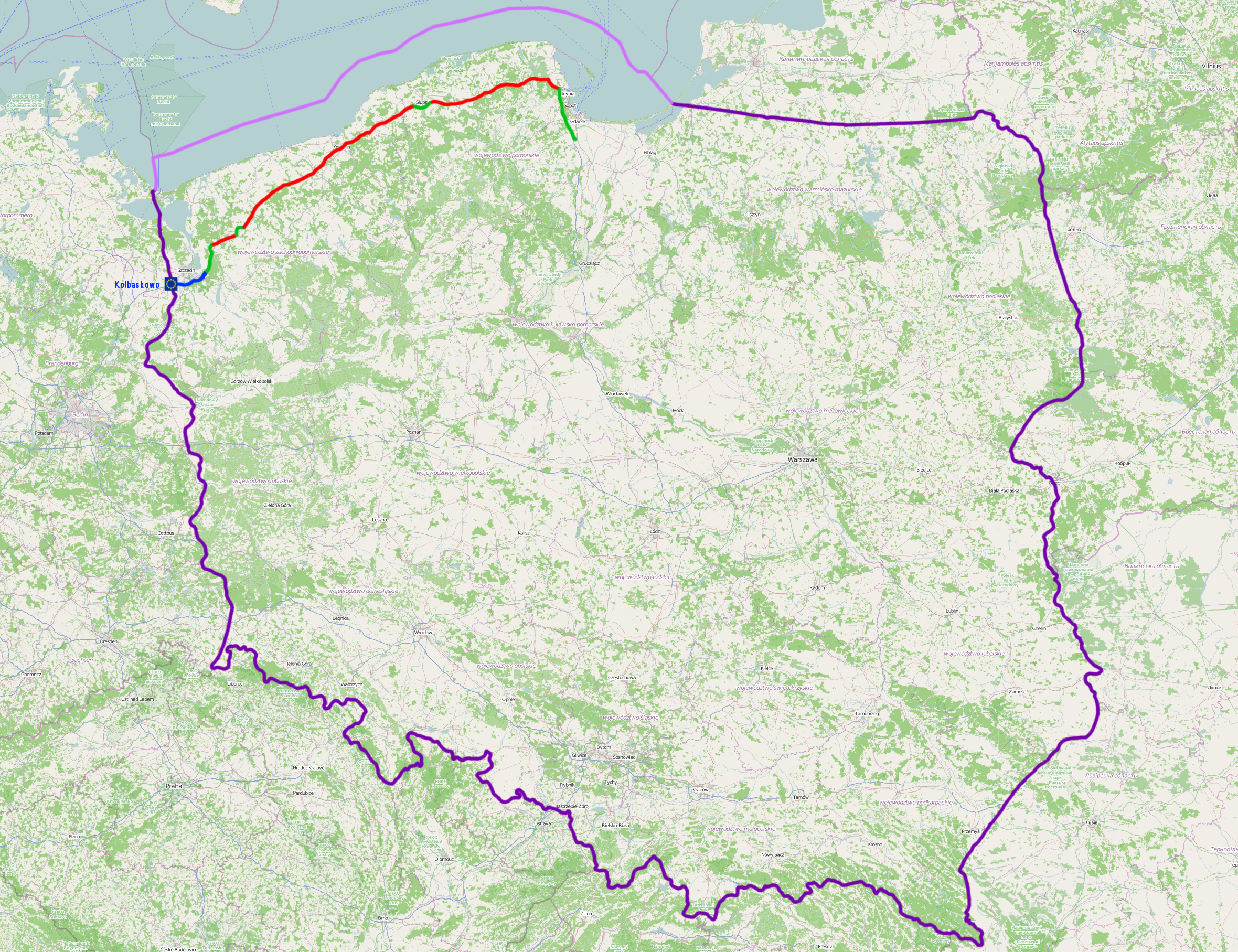

Route information
- Maintained by GDDKiA
- Length: 351 km (218 mi)
- Existed: 1986–present

Major junctions
- West end: German border in Kołbaskowo
- East end: Łęgowo

Location
- Country: Poland
- Regions: West Pomeranian Voivodeship Pomeranian Voivodeship

Highway system
- National roads in Poland; Voivodeship roads
← DK 5	→ DK 7

National Road 6 (Polish: Droga krajowa 6, abbreviated DK 6) is a route belonging to the Polish national roads network. The route is in the north of Poland and runs from the German border, in Kołbaskowo-Nadrensee, to Łęgowo for 351 km. The route runs through the West Pomeranian Voivodeship and the Pomeranian Voivodeship; it is important for transportation between the two largest agglomerations in northern Poland, Szczecin and the Tricity.

The National Road 6 runs from Kołbaskowo and ends in Łęgowo, near Pruszcz Gdański, on the roundabout with the National Road 91.

== A6 motorway ==
The route Kołbaskowo - Kijewo - Dąbie has the status of the A6 motorway. A part of the route Dąbie - Rzęśnica is also labelled as a motorway.

== Expressway S6 ==
A part of the route on the northern bypass, Southern Słupsk Bypass and the western part of the Tricity Beltway, Rzęśnica - Goleniów, the road has the status of an expressway. The Tricity Beltway and the southern Słupsk bypass is presented as the S6 Expressway, with the Rzęśnica–Goleniów route being part of the National Road 3 and S3 Expressway.

== Important settlements along the National Road 6 ==
- Szczecin
- Goleniów
- Płoty
- Karlino
- Koszalin
- Sianów
- Sławno
- Słupsk
- Lębork
- Wejherowo
- Reda
- Rumia
- Gdynia
- Gdańsk
- Pruszcz Gdański
- Rusocin
