= European route E28 =

Road in trans-European E-road network

E28

Major junctions
- West end: Berlin, Germany
- East end: Minsk, Belarus

Location
- Countries: Germany, Poland, Russia, Lithuania, Belarus

Highway system
- International E-road network; A Class; B Class

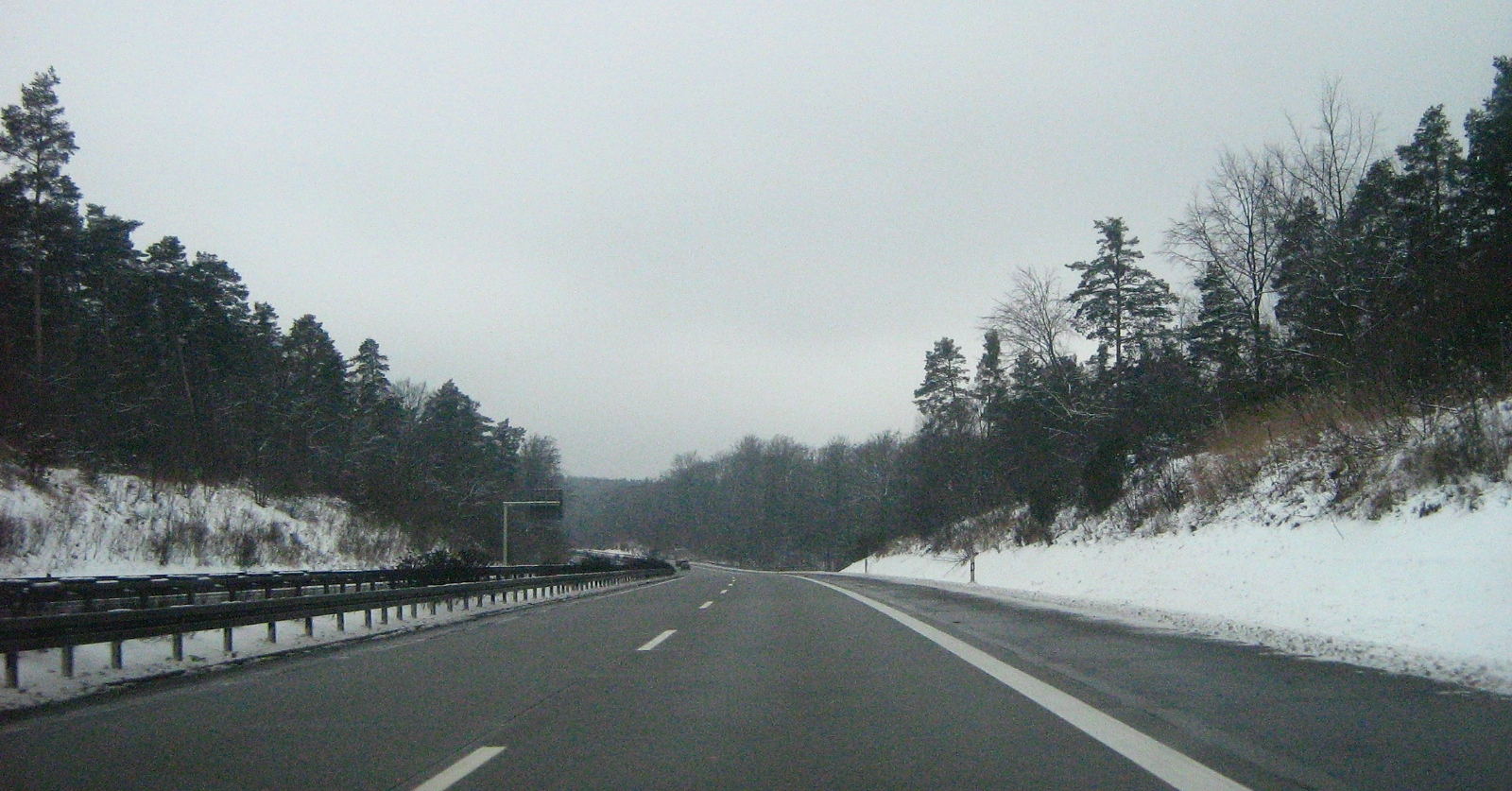
Bundesautobahn 11 in Germany, north of Berlin

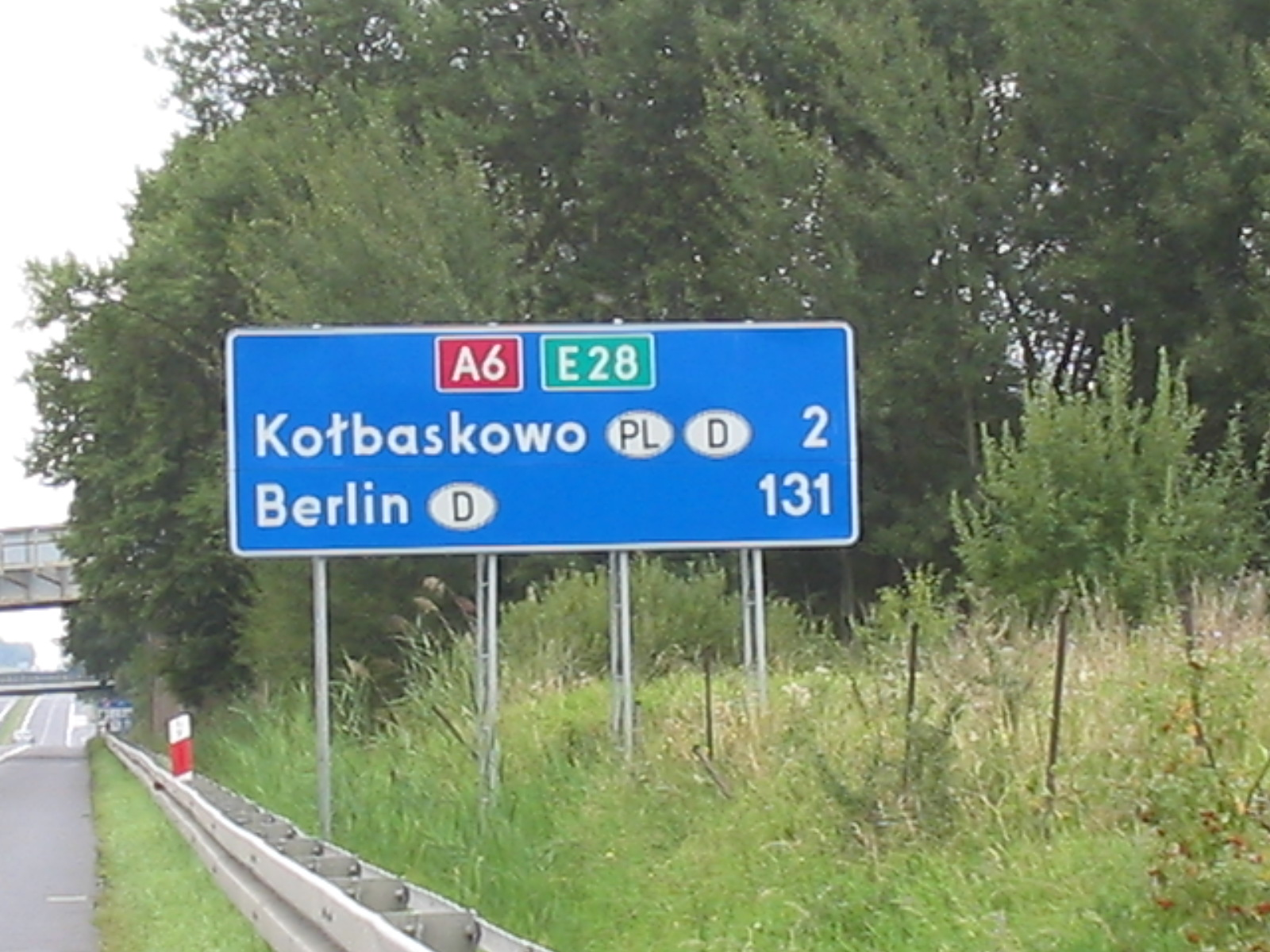
E28 road sign on the A6 highway in direction of Germany-Poland border

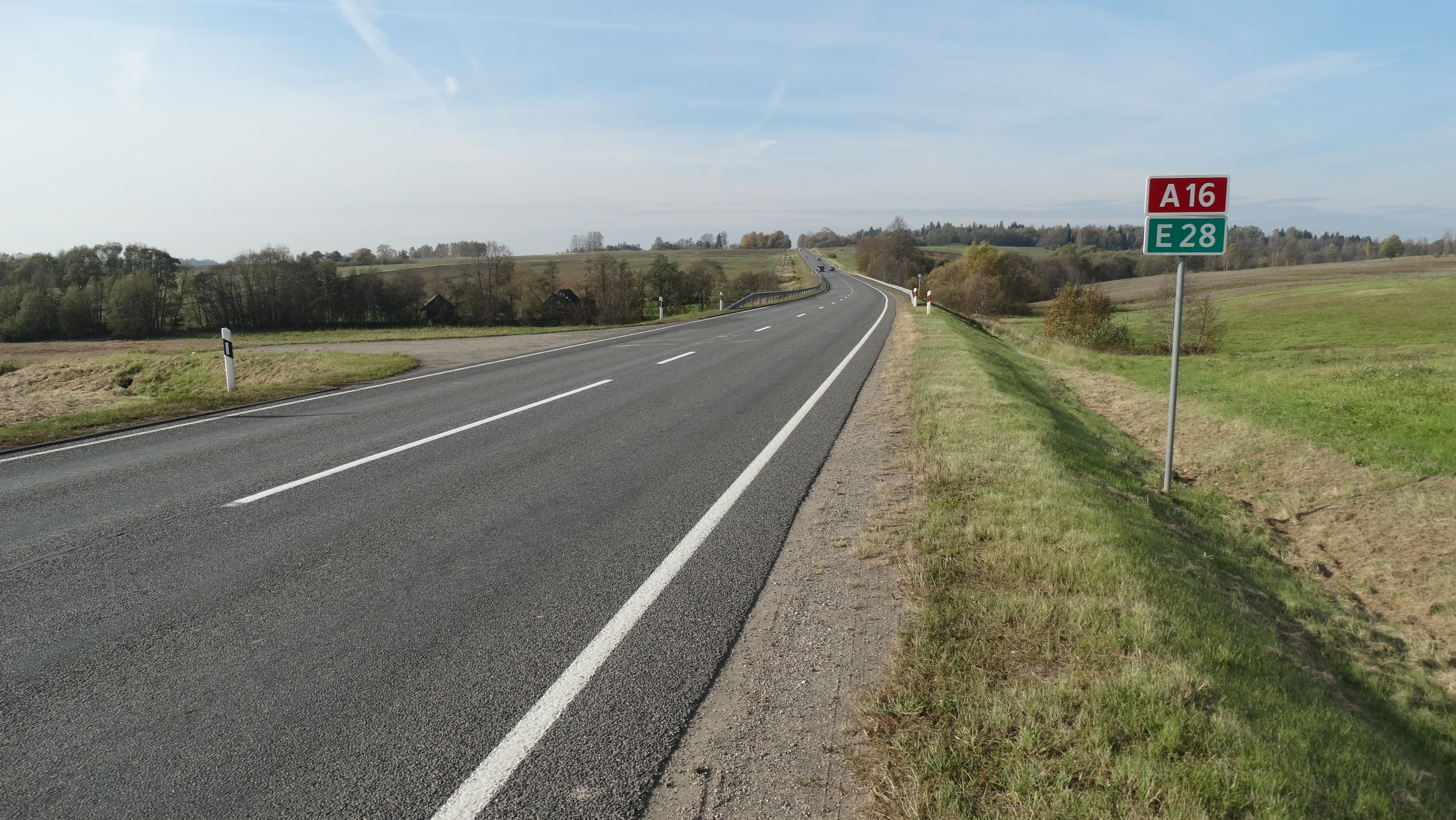
E28 route in Lithuania, near Jieznas (road A 16)

European route E28 is a west–east intermediate road in the international E-road network. Beginning at the Bundesautobahn 10 (Berliner Ring) near Berlin, Germany, it runs west–east for a length of 1,230 km (760 mi) to Minsk, Belarus. The section between Kaliningrad Oblast and Minsk is part of the Pan-European Corridor IX.

== History ==
In the 1975-version of E-roads, the predecessor of this road was the E26 (and current E26 was called E28) going from Berlin to Gdańsk. It changed its name when it still was this short. This was not signposted, as signposting was delayed until the modified version was released, in which the road was called E28.

In the 1950-version of E-roads, signposted until after 1980, the Berlin-Szczecin road was the E74, while Szczecin-Minsk was not an E-road.

== Route ==
Germany

- A 11: Berlin - Prenzlau - Pomellen border crossing

Poland

- A 6: Kołbaskowo - Szczecin
- S 6 / DK 6: Szczecin - Goleniów - Koszalin - Słupsk - Gdańsk
- S 7: Gdańsk - Elbląg
- S 22: (Berlinka) Elbląg - Grzechotki border crossing

Russia

- 27A-021: Mamonovo II - Kaliningrad
- 27A-008: within Kaliningrad
- A 229: Kaliningrad - Nesterov - Chernyshevskoye border crossing

Lithuania

- A 1 / A 7: Kybartai - Marijampolė
- A 16: Marijampolė - Prienai - Vilnius
- A 3: Vilnius - Medininkai border crossing

Belarus

- M 7: to Minsk
