= Szczecin Airport =

Szczecin Airport may refer to:

- Solidarity Szczecin–Goleniów Airport, a major airport serving Szczecin, situated near Goleniów, in Poland (IATA: SZZ)
- Szczecin-Dąbie Airport, a small sport aviation airport in Szczecin proper
- Szczecin-Lotnisko, a municipal neighbourhood of Szczecin
