= Berlinka =

Partially built Nazi German road project

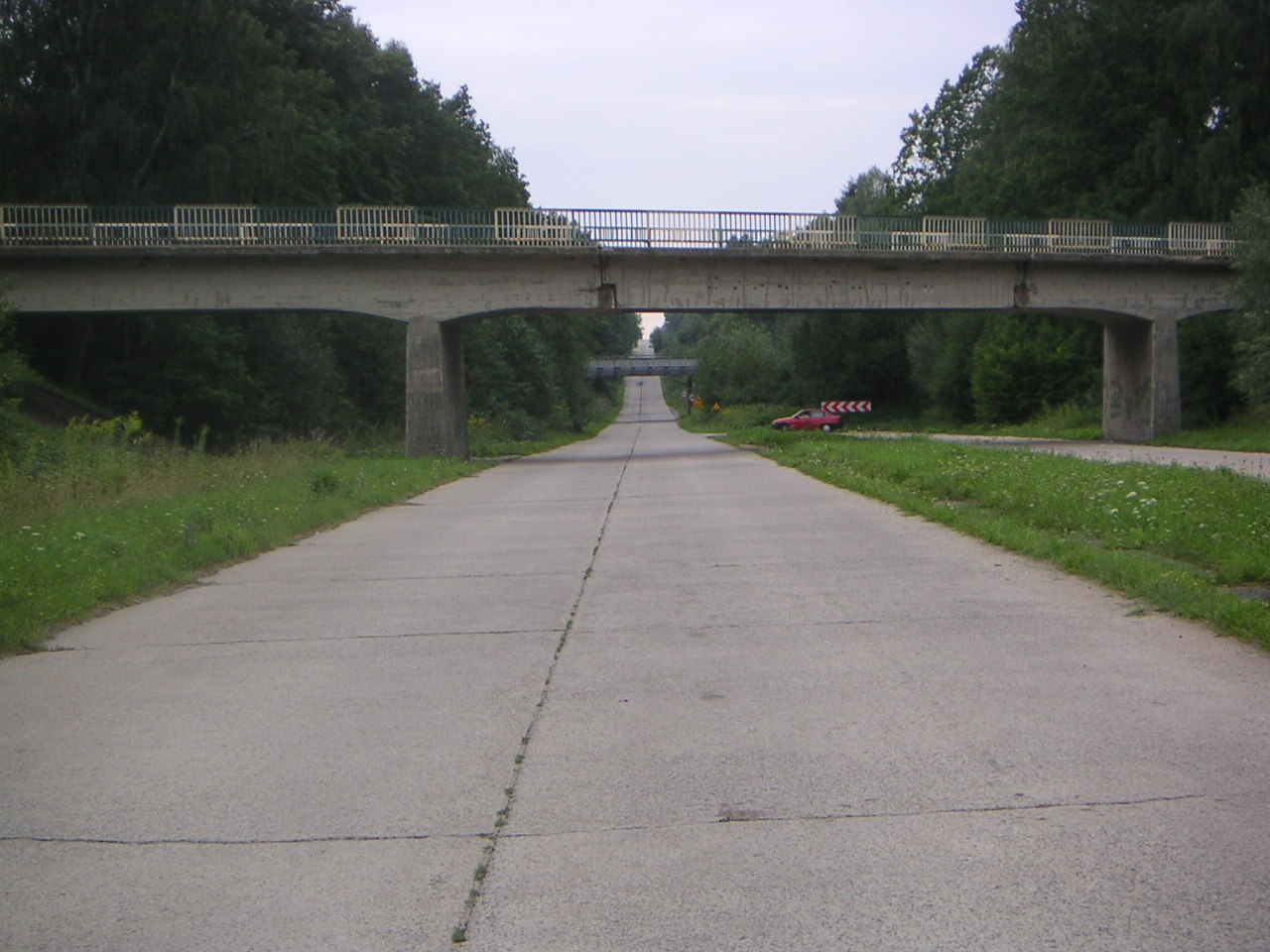
Stretch in Poland, east of Elbląg, as it appeared before 2007 when a complete reconstruction and upgrade began. This section opened as Express Road S22 in September 2008.

Berlinka (Russian: Берлинка) is the informal Polish and Russian name given to sections of the unfinished Reichsautobahn Berlin-Königsberg, which was a pre-World War II German Reichsautobahn project to connect Berlin with Königsberg in East Prussia.

In the late 1930s, the sections near these two cities were finished, but not the larger section in between. The German demand in 1939 to run this road across the Polish Corridor with extraterritorial status and Poland's refusal to allow this were used by Nazi Germany as a pretext to start a war. During the war, the Germans did not continue construction on a large scale and the route was never built. After the war, the German Democratic Republic, the Polish People's Republic and the Soviet Union's Kaliningrad Oblast inherited the remnants.

== Background ==
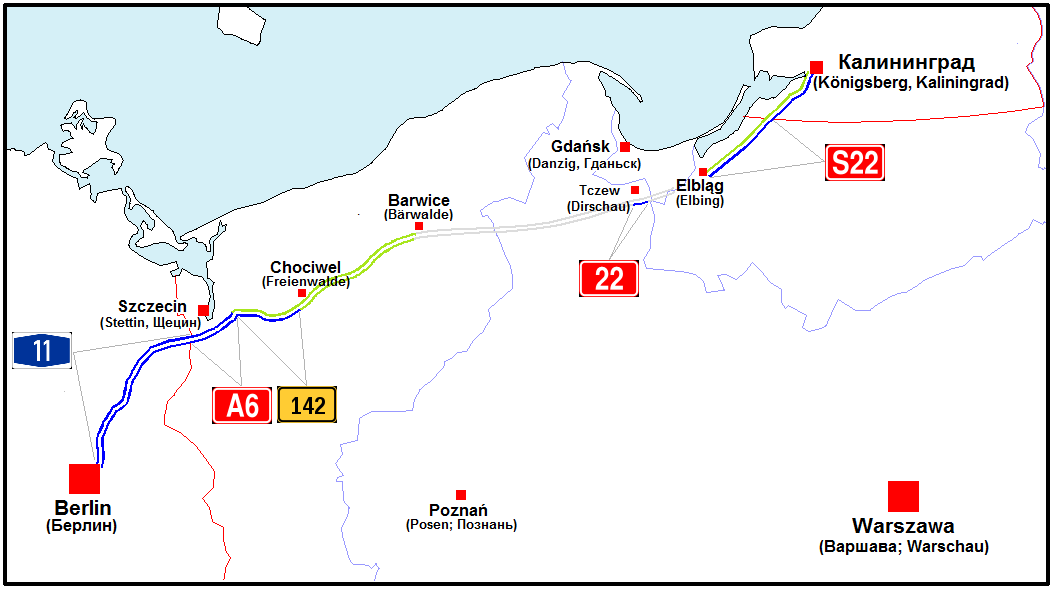
Map of Reichsautobahn Berlin-Königsberg route. Completed sections that are still in use are marked in blue, sections where construction work commenced but never completed are marked in green, and planned sections that never reached construction are marked in grey. The red squares are cities, the red lines are modern day borders and the light blue lines are the pre 1939 borders.

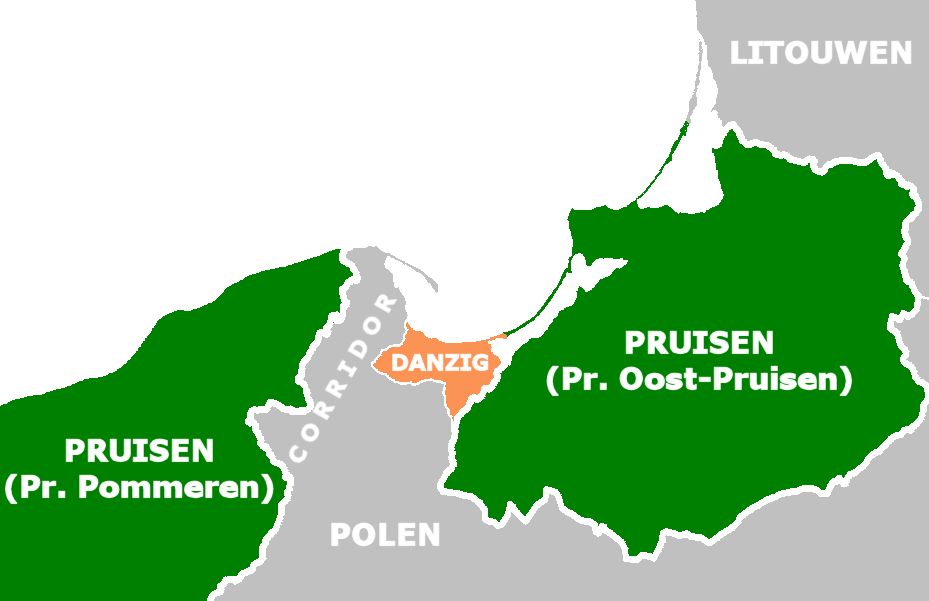
the Polish Corridor and the Free City of Danzig

Eastern Prussia had been separated from Germany following the Treaty of Versailles by the Polish Corridor of the Second Polish Republic. By 1939, Poland had already refused demands made by Nazi Germany, including one for an extraterritorial corridor within the Polish territory. This fact was eventually used by Adolf Hitler as one of the pretexts for the German invasion of Poland in 1939.

The road was planned under the Weimar Republic, but was partially constructed during the 1930s and early 1940s by the Third Reich.

Following territorial changes made after World War II it ran through three countries: the Soviet Union's Kaliningrad Oblast (today an exclave of the same name, in post-1991 Russia), Poland, and what had been East Germany through to October 1990. Its original purpose gone, some segments of the road were incorporated into local road networks while most of it fell into disrepair. The border between the Kaliningrad Oblast and Poland was completely sealed to civilian traffic during the Cold War, given the high density of Soviet military installations in that area, which ensured the Berlinka section in that area saw almost no use. The border between Poland and East Germany was open to civilian traffic but the economies of the two countries were not well connected and auto traffic between them was not significant for many decades. Given these conditions, some segments of Berlinka became a minor tourist attraction in the years after the war, as an example of a Nazi-built autobahn preserved in an almost pristine state, carrying very little or no traffic. A number of movies made in Poland and the USSR that were set in Germany had their autobahn scenes shot on Berlinka sections. A popular Polish book and television series about Pan Samochodzik had a high speed car chase that was set on Berlinka (as at the time one of the few places in Poland where a high speed car chase was even plausible, given the execrable condition of other roads). In recent years that attraction has diminished as most of the stretches completed in the 1930s have been reconstructed to modern standards and largely lost their original appearance. Today the last remaining stretch in Poland that still has Nazi era construction features is signed as voivodeship road 142, north-east of Szczecin. As that stretch is only a local road, it is unlikely to be rebuilt in the foreseeable future. On the Russian side, the remains of the old road are still visible (54.5264296°N 20.2836840°E) next to the E28 highway from the Polish-Russian border to the ring road of the city of Kaliningrad.

Along with constructing the motorway, after invading Poland, the Germans also quickly upgraded the main road going to East Prussia, in places paving it with concrete. Even though it is only a single carriageway road and not a motorway, it is also considered to be a part of the Berlinka's route. This section includes one interesting cloverleaf interchange (54.04836°N 18.7610°E) some 34.5 kilometres (21.4 miles) south-southeast of Gdańsk, and a large bridge over the Vistula south of Tczew (54.05205°N 18.81676°E).

== Construction ==
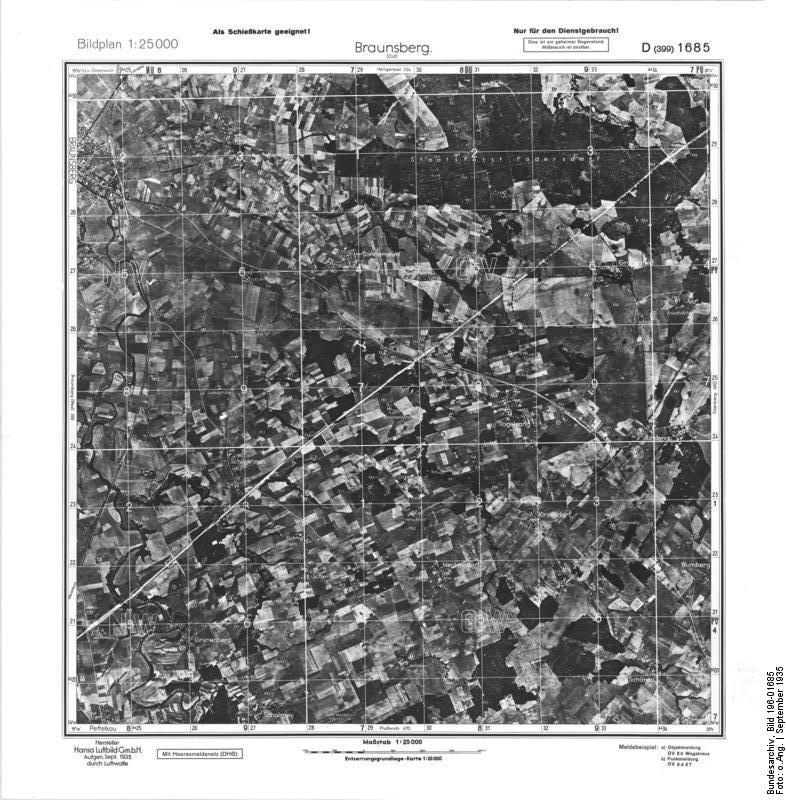
Reichsautobahn east of Braniewo (Braunsberg), aerial photo from September 1935

Construction began in late 1933, using unemployed German workers as part of the state's reforms to counteract the Great Depression, the construction of the Reichsautobahn (RAB) network. The first 113 kilometre (70 mile) long segment near Stettin (now Szczecin), Stettiner Dreieck to Stettin-Süd, was opened on September 27, 1936. The segment from Königsberg to Elbing (now Elbląg) was opened in 1937. In 1937, beltways near Stettin and Elbing were built.

In 1938, work slowed as Germany geared up for war, and workers were directed to other projects. The highway featured prominently in Nazi political rhetoric of 1939, as Hitler's demands included an extraterritorial corridor—the Danzig Corridor through the Polish Corridor—which would connect Germany to Eastern Prussia. This, alongside other demands, was refused by the Polish government, and Hitler used this as one of the pretexts for the invasion of Poland in September 1939.

By October 1939, Poland was defeated, and work on the Berlinka resumed. The labour pool was increasingly composed of conscript workers from Poland. The Bäderstraße (near Rzęśnica and Wielgowo) to Stargard-Massow (near Łęczyca) segment was built subsequently. Construction stopped in 1942, as military priorities once again took over available labour. In 1945, German forces, retreating along the Eastern Front, blew up most of the bridges to slow the Soviet advance.

== Aftermath ==
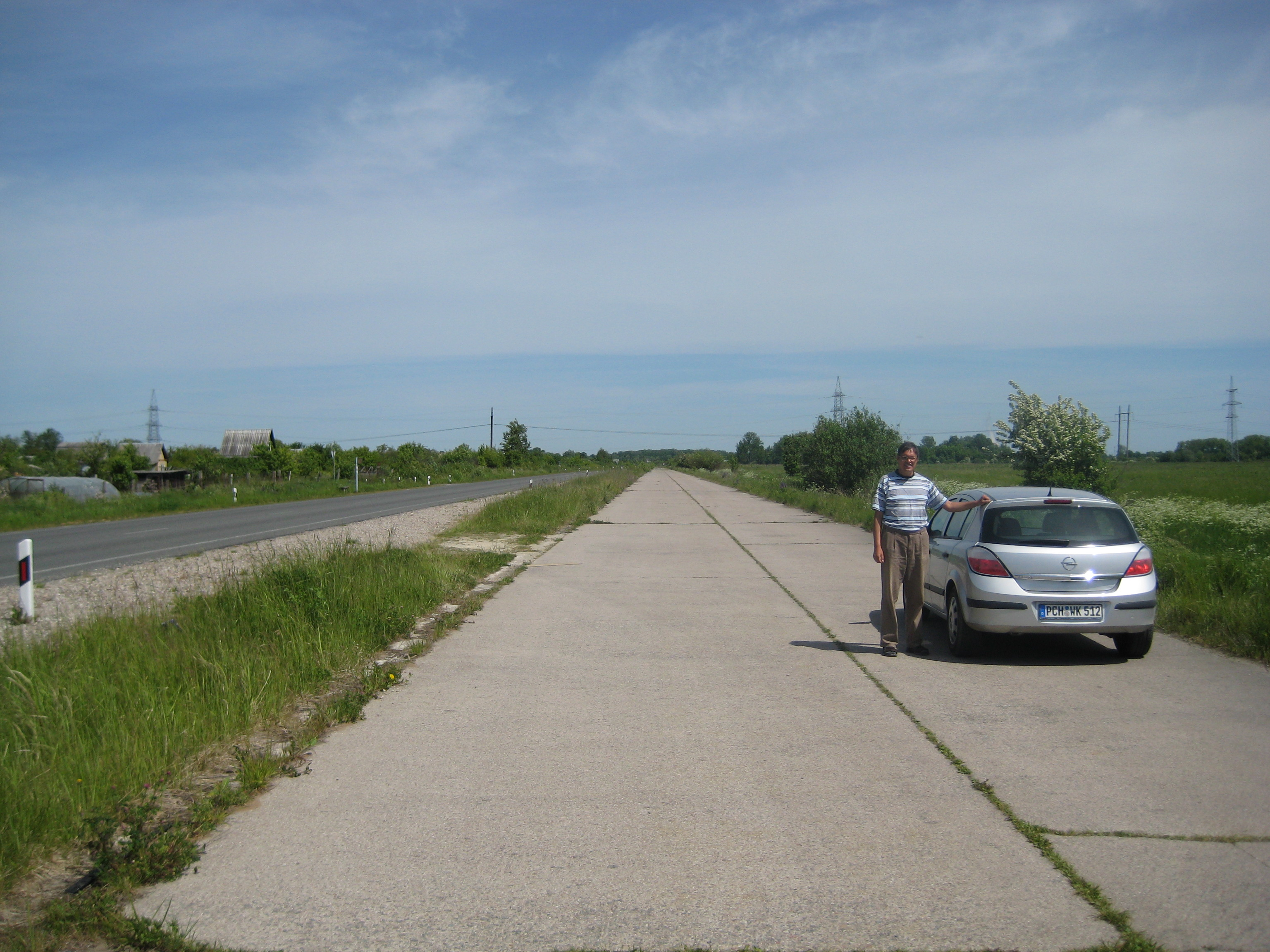
Berlinka in Russia, with original concrete carriageway on the right and later modern carriageway on the left

Because of territorial changes of Poland and Germany following the war, the road was divided and lost its importance as a route between German cities (most of Prussia's German population was expelled to Germany). The part that remained within German borders became the Bundesautobahn 11 after reunification.

Certain segments of the route were nonetheless restored. In the Polish People's Republic, bridges over the Oder River near Szczecin were restored soon after the war, as were the bridges on the Banówka River near the border with the Kaliningrad Oblast. In the 1970s, the planned part of the highway from Maszewo (near Łęczyca) to Chociwel was finished, and bridges on the Ina River restored.

With the end of the Cold War, and particularly with Poland joining the European Union, increasing thought has been given to reconstructing the road as part of the European highway system. In the 1990s, a 14 kilometre (8.7 mile) long segment near the western Polish border was incorporated into the new A6 Autostrada (highway). A further 7 kilometres (4.3 miles), to the junction with National Road 10, was being restored and was scheduled to open for traffic in August 2007. An additional 8 kilometres (5.0 miles) is to be upgraded at some future date and redesignated as part of the A6. The section between Elbląg and the border with Russia was completely reconstructed and opened as an express road, S22, in September 2008. In the course of the upgrade, the new modern carriageway was built in the space left for the second carriageway during original construction. At the same time, the original concrete carriageway was demolished almost along the entire length of the route, and only a few traces of it remain. All of the remaining original overpasses and bridges were demolished and replaced with modern works. Thus very few traces of the original German autobahn can be seen. Other part of the Berlinka are incorporated into voivodeship road 142, and expressroad 6/3. In the Russian Kaliningrad Oblast, it is incorporated into road P516.

As the original road was designed over 80 years ago, it would make little sense today to run a modern motorway along the same route as factors affecting road design changed greatly. Currently the road in Poland which will serve most of the route along which the Berlinka runs will be the S6 Expressway, set to the north of the Berlinka's route, closer to the Baltic coast and running from Szczecin to Gdańsk.

== See also ==
- Borovsko Bridge
- Danube-Oder Canal
- M2 highway (Russia), the "Crimea" motorway from Moscow to the Ukraine border at Hoptivka, with an uncertain completion date to the Crimea.
