= Bundesautobahn 11 =

Federal motorway in Germany

A 11
- Bundesautobahn 11

Route information
- Part of E28
- Length: 112 km (70 mi)
- Existed: 1936–present

Major junctions
- South end: A 10 in Berlin
- B 273 in Wandlitz; B 167 in Finowfurt; A 20 in Uckermark
- North end: A6 in Nadrensee (border with Poland)

Location
- Country: Germany
- States: Mecklenburg-Vorpommern, Brandenburg

Highway system
- Roads in Germany; Autobahns; List; Federal; List; State; E-roads
| ← A 10 | → A 12 |

Bundesautobahn 11 (translates from German as Federal Motorway 11, short form Autobahn 11, abbreviated as BAB 11 or A 11) is an autobahn in eastern Germany that was opened in 1936. As it is partly in a dilapidated state, it is currently undergoing modernisation works on various stretches. The road forms the main connection between Berlin and Szczecin, and it is connected to the Polish motorway A6 at Mecklenburg-Vorpommern.

In the 1930s, it was planned and completed as a part of the Reichsautobahn Berlin-Königsberg (Berlinka). This autobahn, together with A 10, forms part of the north-eastern border of Berlin.

The whole of the A 11 is also designated as the E28, also thus constituting the E28's entire run through Germany.

== History ==
The planning for the Stettiner Dreieck (now Barnim Cross) and the first four lane kilometers, including the transfer of the Reichsstraße 2 began in April 1935. The construction was on the one hand a job creation project, on the other hand, in the then structurally weak region then the economic boom should be propagated,

The route from the Berliner Ring to Joachimsthal was already released on 4 April 1936, until 27 September of the same year the highway was passable to Szczecin-South. In 1937 the Oder bridges were completed and the route to Stettin released. The junction Wandlitz (completion 1971) was created later for better accessibility of the forest settlement - a residential area for the members of the SED Politburo of the former GDR. Likewise, the junction Chorin was built only after 1945. This also explains the short distance for Reichsautobahnen Joachimsthal junction of about 1.5 kilometers.

The now integrated into the cross Barnim branch of the A 11 from the Berlin ring was called in the GDR branch Penkun or branch Prenzlau and was renamed in the 1990s in "triangle Schwanebeck". The motorway junction was used 1952–1973 as Bernauer loop for car and motorcycle races. The steep curve was demolished in the 1990s.

Until reunification in 1990, the West Berlin part of the Transitautobahn to Hamburg bore the designation A 11. It is now called A 111. In 1991, the heavily used junction, Gramzow on the B 198 (then called AS Prenzlau), was completely rebuilt as part of the first major construction project since 1936. During construction, the junction was closed for several months. At the same time, the basic extension of the A 11 in the area to approx 500m including the construction of the hard shoulder strips took place. The expansion was required because no acceleration and deceleration strips were available before.

The A11 has been refurbished since 1996 on most of its route by a modern road surface and the widening to newly created lanes. As a special feature, the A 11 in the area of the Schorfheide-Chorin Biosphere Reserve has no hard shoulder, although the new development took place after 2000. By 2007, the highway had a desolate road condition on some sections. For example, on the section between kilometers 95.0 and 101.0, since 2003 traffic has been carried on only one lane with one lane per direction of travel. The unused roadway still consisted of brittle concrete slabs from the 1930s. It was not until December 2007 that the rehabilitated route was opened to traffic. Since November 2008, the section between the interchange Kreuz Uckermark and the interchange Schmölln is renewed.

From May 5, 2011, to November 11, 2013, the Schwanebeck Triangle was rebuilt into Barnim Cross. This was also associated with the fundamental expansion of the A 11 in the first about three kilometres. A bridge for wildlife is located in the Grumsinerforst forest, between the exits of Joachimsthal and Pfingstberg (part of Flieth-Stegelitz). The bridge is made of reinforced concrete, over which a special foil was laid and then covered with sand and topsoil. The cost of the construction completed in May 2005 was around three million euros. Since commissioning, the path has been monitored by means of a camera. By October 2006, 2,300 debris were counted. The bridge is used by fallow deer, deer, wild boars, rabbits, foxes, badgers, raccoon dogs and martens. Red deer could not be observed yet.

According to the General Association of the German Insurance Industry, the emergency pillar between Chorin and Werbellin in the direction of Berlin was used for 199 emergency calls in 2010, making it the most widely used on German highways.

The highway had several other connection points during the GDR period, which were gradually shut down after the reunification. There additional junctions had been set up because numerous state hunting areas and recreational areas of the GDR leadership were located along the A11, as well as bunkers for the GDR leadership. After the fall of the wall, junctions were no longer needed because they were in sparsely populated areas and the main reason for their operation fell away. They were gradually dismantled.

== Exit list ==
| A 6 | Poland |
| (1) | Pomellen border crossing |
| (3) | Penkun B 113 |
| (4) | Schmölln |
| (5) | Uckermark 4-way interchange A 20 B 166 |
| (6) | Gramzow B 198 |
| (7) | Warnitz |
| (8) | Pfingstberg |
| (9) | Joachimsthal B 198 |
| (10) | Chorin |
| (11) | Werbellin |
| | Services Buckowsee |
| | Finowfurt-Nord (planned) |
| | Oder-Havel-Kanal-Brücke 200 m |
| (12) | Finowfurt B 167 |
| | Finowkanalbrücke 100 m |
| (13) | Lanke |
| | Oberseebrücke 147 m |
| (14) | Wandlitz B 273 |
| (15) | Bernau-Nord |
| (16) | Bernau-Süd B 2 |
| (17) | Kreuz Barnim 3-way interchange A 10 B 2 |
