= Banówka =

Banówka may refer to:

- Banówka, Polish name for the Mamonovka River
- Banówka, Polish name for Baníkov, a mountain in the Western Tatras mountain range
