= Expressway S6 (Poland) =

Road in Poland

Expressway S6
- Droga ekspresowa S6

Route information
- Part of E28
- Length: 217.2 km (135.0 mi) 79.07 km (49 mi) under construction

Major junctions
- West end: A6 near Szczecin-Goleniów "Solidarność" Airport
- S11 near Kołobrzeg (planned); S7 near Gdańsk
- East end: A1 south of Gdańsk

Location
- Country: Poland
- Major cities: Szczecin, Gdynia, Gdańsk

Highway system
- National roads in Poland; Voivodeship roads
← S 5	→ S 7

Expressway S6 (in Polish droga ekspresowa S6) is a Polish highway which runs from the A6 autostrada near Szczecin, through Koszalin to Gdańsk, parallel to the Baltic coast, forming the main connection between Gdańsk and Szczecin.

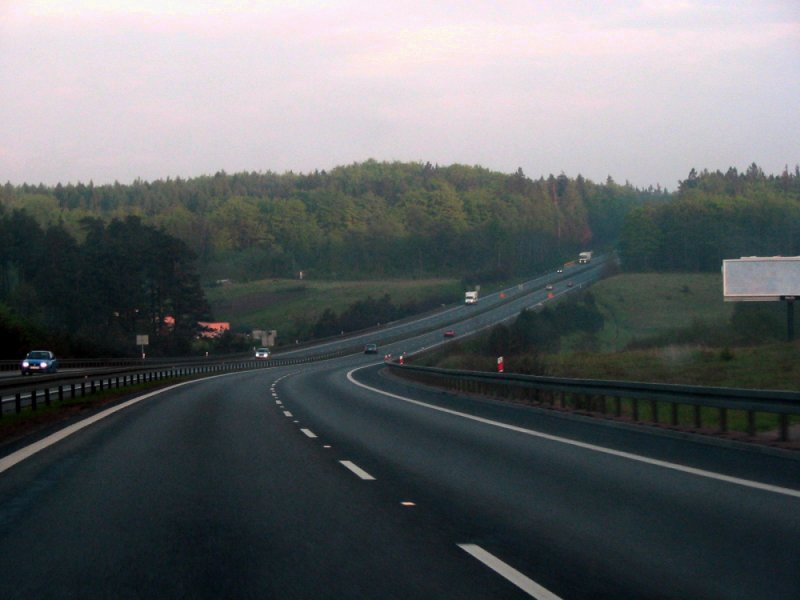
Obwodnica Trójmiejska

Since June 2026, the entire route of A6/S6 from the German border to Gdańsk is open to traffic. Additionally, a new route of S6 forming the western bypass of Szczecin is under construction, planned to provide a parallel alternative to the existing route of A6 and S6 south-east of Szczecin.

== History ==
After World War I, the German HaFraBa association had already set up plans to build an Autobahn along the route from Berlin through the Polish Corridor, to the Free City of Danzig and East Prussia (today informally known as Berlinka). The construction was pushed by the Nazi authorities after 1933 as an extraterritorial Reichsautobahn across the Polish Corridor of prewar Poland further south than the modern S6 freeway has been planned for, but the road was never completed.

The first section of S6 built was the Obwodnica Trójmiejska (Tricity Bypass) from Gdańsk to Gdynia, which is 38.6 km (24.0 mi) long, followed by the section between Szczecin and Goleniów, both in the 1970s. The next part of S6 to be opened was 16.3 km (10.1 mi) bypass of Słupsk that was completed in October 2010. The bypass of Nowogard was completed in December 2011, with the rest of the section between Szczecin and Koszalin open by 2019.

In July 2010, the route between Goleniów and Słupsk was finalised. It will be about 180 km (110 mi) long and pass just south of Kołobrzeg and then north of Koszalin. The road will be a dual carriageway, with 27 interchanges and 130 viaducts, with about 20% of it overlapping the current route of National Road 6 (DK6). Doubts about financing made construction not expected to start before 2020, but the schedule was later accelerated. The tenders for design-build contracts on the section between Goleniów and Koszalin were announced in August 2014, with expected completion around 2018. The section from Koszalin to Lębork was completed in 2025 and 2026.

== Sections ==
Expressway section	Length	Constructed	Note
Szczecin Zachód (A6) - Goleniów Północ (S3)	51 km	2026-2033	Western bypass of Szczecin, under construction
Szczecin Rzęśnica (end of A6) - Goleniów Północ (S3)	20 km	1976-1979	Reconstructed to modern standard in 2020–2021, overlaps with S3 on this section.
Goleniów Północ - Nowogard Zachód	19.2 km	2015–2019	Opened April 2019
Nowogard bypass	9.4 km	2010–2011	Opened December 2011
Nowogard Wschód - Kołobrzeg Zachód	58.6 km	2015–2019	Opened November 2019
Kolobrzeg Zachód - Koszalin (S11)	38.9 km	2015–2019	Opened November 2019
Koszalin - Słupsk	66.1 km	2022–2025	Opened December 2025
Słupsk bypass	16.3 km	2010–2025	Opened December 2010 (one carriageway) and July 2025 (second carriageway)
Słupsk - Leśnice	42.5 km	2021–2026	Opened June 2026
Leśnice - Bożepole Wielkie	22 km	2021–2026	Opened April 2026
Bożepole Wielkie - Gdynia (S7)	41 km	2019–2022	Opened December 2022
Tricity 1st bypass	38.6 km	1973–2008	Built in stages starting in 1973, serves mainly the local traffic to and from Gdańsk. Since 2025, Tricity 2nd bypass (S7) is open, providing the more convenient route for the transit traffic around Gdańsk.

== See also ==
- A6 autostrada (Poland)
- Highways in Poland
