= Kołbaskowo =

- Village
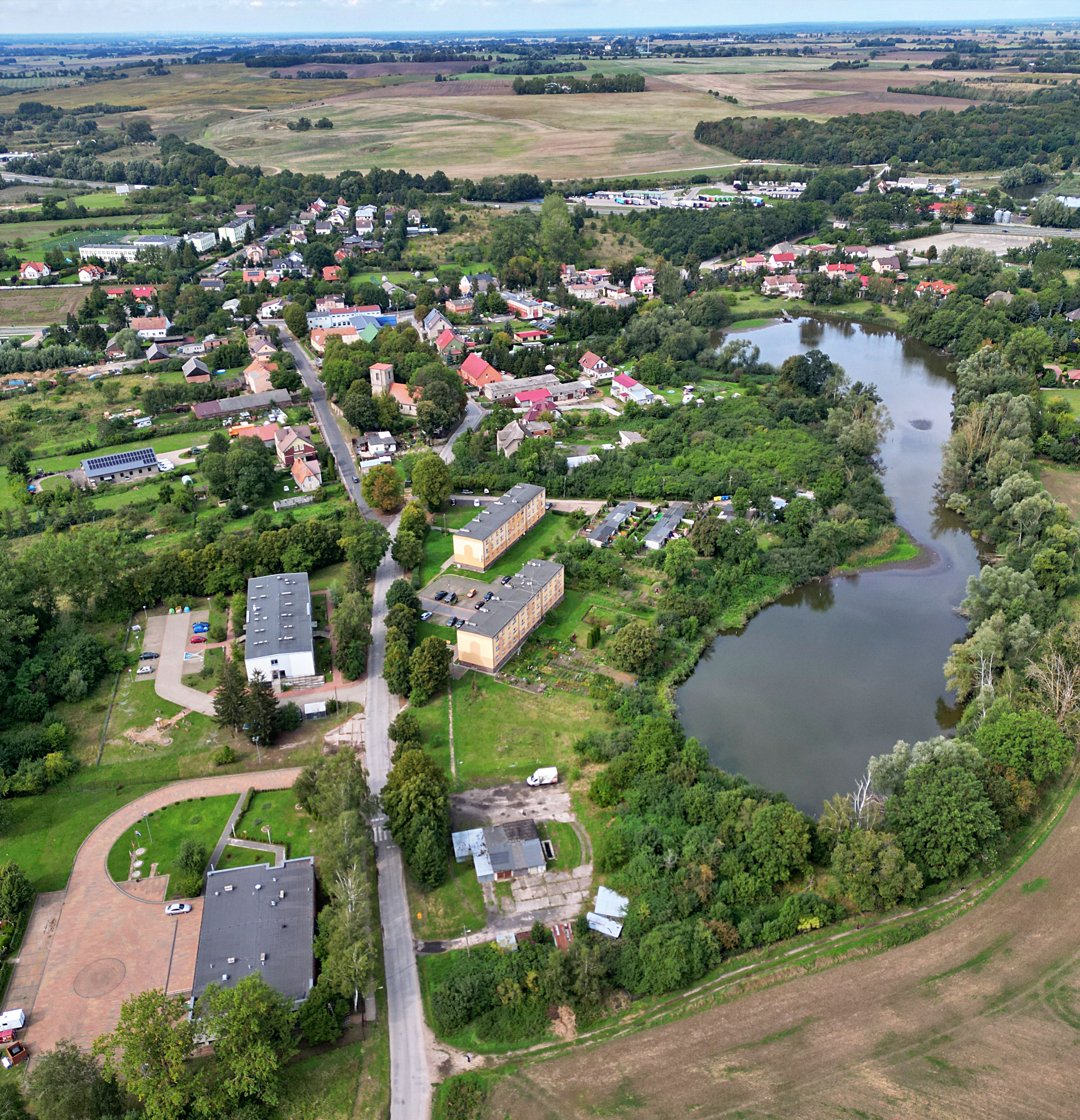
- General view of Kołbaskowo

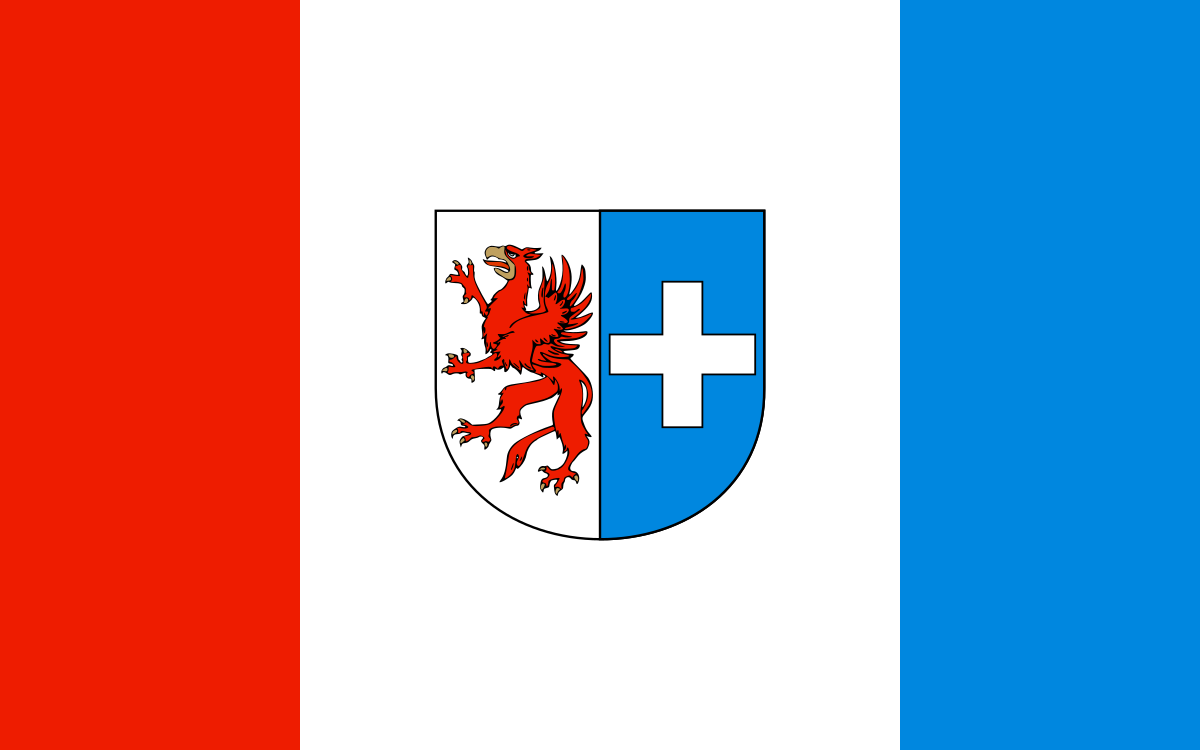
- Flag Coat of arms

- Location within Poland
- Coordinates: 53°20′9″N 14°26′18″E
- Country: Poland
- Voivodeship: West Pomeranian
- County: Police
- Gmina: Kołbaskowo
- First mentioned: 1243
- Population: 410 (2,006)
- Time zone: UTC+1 (CET)
  - Summer (DST): UTC+2 (CEST)
- Vehicle registration: ZPL
- Primary airport: Solidarity Szczecin–Goleniów Airport
- Website: http://www.kolbaskowo.pl

Kołbaskowo [kɔu̯basˈkɔvɔ] (German: Kolbitzow) is a village in Police County, West Pomeranian Voivodeship, in north-western Poland, close to the German border. It is the seat of the gmina (administrative district) called Gmina Kołbaskowo. It lies approximately 24 km (15 mi) south of Police and 14 km (9 mi) south-west of the regional capital Szczecin.

The motorway at Kołbaskowo is the site of a major Schengen border crossing on the European route E28 connecting Berlin (Germany) with Szczecin and Gdańsk. The neighbouring village on the German side of the border is Pomellen, part of the Nadrensee municipality.

== History ==
The oldest known mention of the village comes from 1243, when Duke Barnim I granted the local tithe to the Cistercian women monastery in Szczecin. The village was eventually granted to the Cistercian nuns in 1286. Its name comes from the male name Kołbasek, which in turn comes from the Polish word kiełbaska. Since the Middle Ages the area was part of Poland, the Duchy of Pomerania following Poland's fragmentation, Sweden, Prussia and Germany, before it became part of Poland again following the defeat of Nazi Germany in World War II in 1945.

== Heritage monument ==
The most precious historic landmark of the village is the Romanesque Holy Trinity church with Gothic and Baroque interior, which was built in the 13th century with granite.

== Communication ==
Kołbaskowo can be reached from Szczecin via the A6 autostrada and the National road (Droga krajowa) No. 13. The Bus line 81 leads to Siadło Górne, Przecław and Szczecin: Gumieńce, Kościuszko Square and Nowe Miasto.

== Sports ==
The local football club is Zryw Kołbaskowo, founded in 1971. It competes in the lower leagues.

== Notable people ==
- Longin Komołowski (1948–2016), Polish politician and activist, co-founder of the Solidarity movement in Szczecin, honorary citizen of Kołbaskowo

== Gallery ==
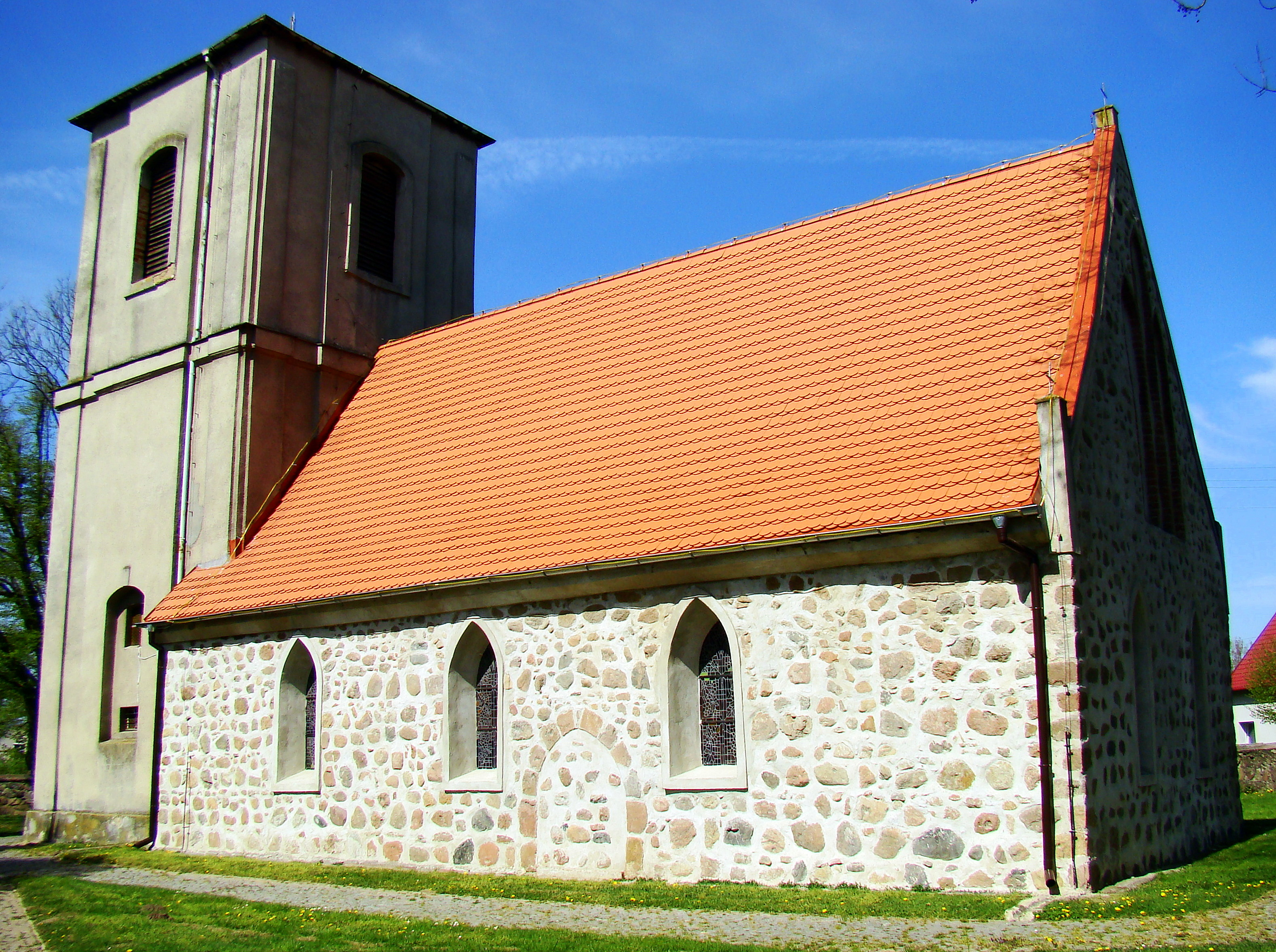
Romanesque Holy Trinity church

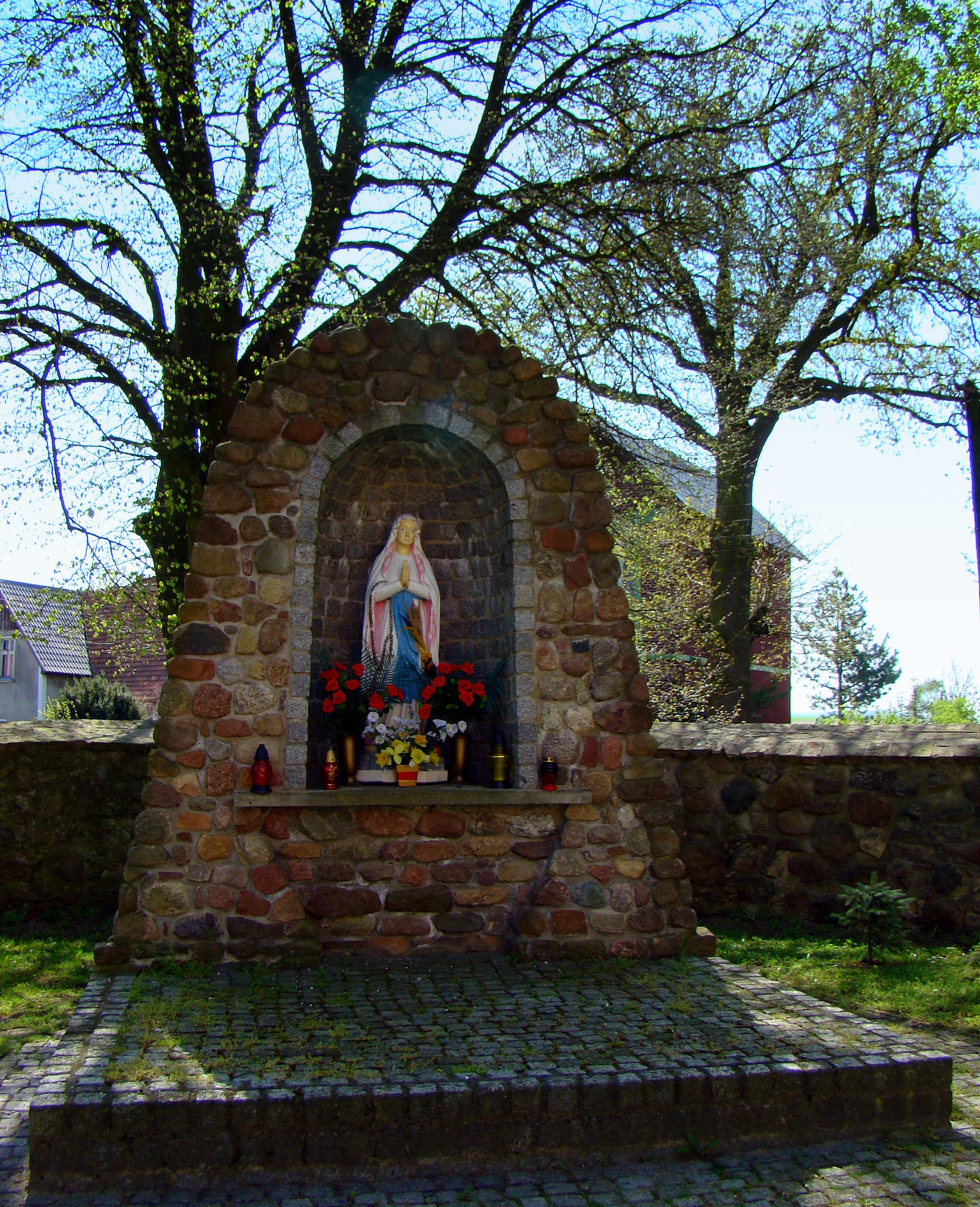
Marian shrine

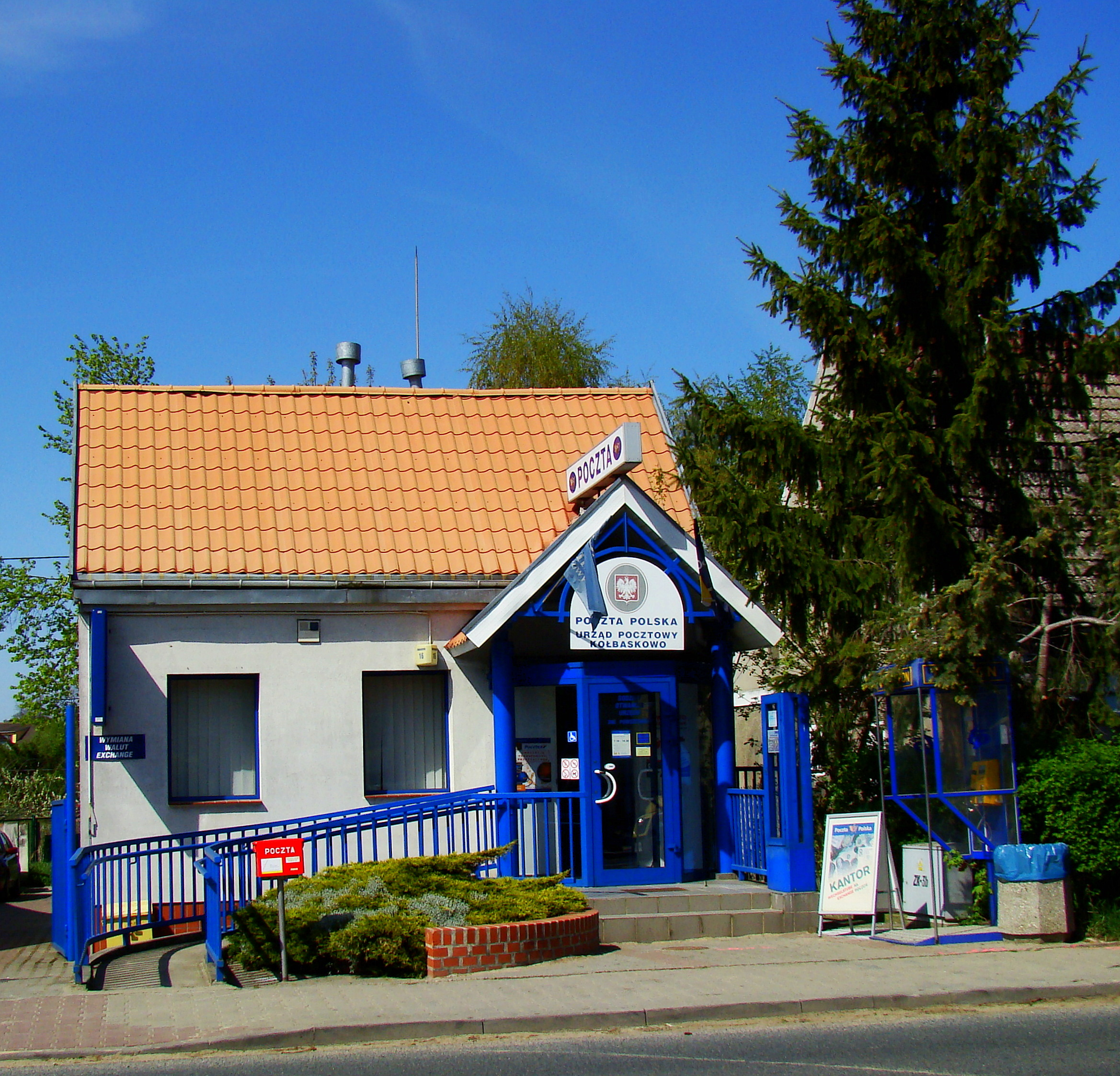
Post office (2009)
