= A6 autostrada (Poland) =

Motorway in Poland

Autostrada A6

Route information
- Part of E28
- Length: 29.2 km (18.1 mi)

Major junctions
- From: Bundesautobahn 11 at border with Germany at Pomellen – Kołbaskowo
- S3 express road S10 express road (planned)

Location
- Country: Poland
- Major cities: Szczecin

Highway system
- National roads in Poland; Voivodeship roads
← A 4	→ A 8

The autostrada A6 in Poland is a short motorway that starts at the Polish/German border at Kołbaskowo/Pomellen connecting to the German A11 autobahn. It forms a southern bypass of the Szczecin metropolitan area and terminates at Rzęśnica interchange to the east of the city, from where it continues in an expressway standard as S3 towards Świnoujście and S6 towards Gdańsk. Its length is 29.2 km (18.1 mi). The motorway is part of the European route E28.

== Chronology ==
=== The 1930s (construction) ===
The motorway had its beginning as part of the Reichsautobahn system built by Germany in the 1930s, as part of a planned motorway connection from Berlin through the "Polish Corridor" to Königsberg in East Prussia (now Kaliningrad, Russia). Construction works proceeded up to Rummelsburg (Miastko) after the 1939 Invasion of Poland but finally discontinued in 1942 because of the impact of World War II. After the war, the highway sections that, together with the surrounding area, became a part of Poland were dubbed Berlinka. The post-1945 borders meant that the need for a high-capacity road connection on that route disappeared. Even though much of the construction work had already been completed, it was not continued by the postwar Polish government.

Of the portion that ended up on Polish territory, only a 29.2 km (18.1 mi) stretch east from the Oder-Neisse line border with Germany was fully completed as a dual-carriageway autobahn (in 1936–1937), which became the A6 of today. Further east, for another 30 km (19 mi), one finds a partially completed, single-lane motorway, signed as voivodeship road 142 (part of it has been reconstructed to also serve as an emergency military road airstrip). Further east, the road is no longer passable, but the earthworks left from the motorway construction stretch for about 100 km (62 mi) more and are easily visible on satellite photographs. While not part of the A6 in any formal sense, another part of the Berlin-Königsberg autobahn was the single carriageway section east of Elbląg (Elbing), built in prewar East Prussia and now in Poland and Russia. That stretch had been rebuilt and was opened to traffic in 2008 as express road S22.

=== 1996 to 2022 (reconstruction) ===
In the years after the war, the damage caused by wartime demolitions was repaired but not completely, as some Oder bridges were rebuilt only as a single carriageway. The motorway saw no more significant upgrade or reconstruction until the 1990s. As a result, it fell far short of modern standards and so on some maps, it was not marked as a motorway in whole or in part. Work on upgrading the highway to modern standards began in 1996, starting with the full rebuilding of Oder bridges. The first 22 km from the German border to the junction with national road 10 have been reconstructed from 1996 to 1999 and from 2005 to 2007.

The eastern 6.5 km were reconstructed and then officially redesignated as A6 in 2012 to 2014 and 2017 to 2020. Interchange Kijewo was reconstructed from 2019 to 2022, which finished the process of resurfacing the whole length of A6.

=== Future developments ===
Eight bids were received in the tender for the construction of the second stage of the Przecław and Warzymice bypass along the DK13, the Kołbasków bypass along the DK13 and the construction of road infrastructure, including a new junction on the border section of the A6. Completion is planned for 2028.

== Exit list ==
Country	Voivodeship	Location	km	mi	Exit	Name	Destinations	Notes
Poland	West Pomeranian Voivodeship	Gmina Kołbaskowo	0	0.0	—	Kołbaskowo / Pomellen former border crossing	A 11 / E28 – Berlin	Southwestern endpoint of motorway, route continues as German motorway A 11 towards Berlin Kilometrage starting point Border crossing is no longer operational since 21 December 2007, due to Poland signing Schengen Agreement Western terminus of E28 overlap
Poland	West Pomeranian Voivodeship	Kołbaskowo	2.7	1.7	—	Szczecin Zachód	DK 13 – Szczecin / Rosówek	Filling station in direction towards Szczecin Junction will be closed in the future
Poland	West Pomeranian Voivodeship	Kołbaskowo	3.8	2.4	—	Kołbaskowo Południe	S 6 – Szczecin, Police, Goleniów (planned western bypass of Szczecin); DK 13 – Szczecin / Rosówek	Proposed interchange, will replace Szczecin Zachód junction
Poland	West Pomeranian Voivodeship	Gmina Kołbaskowo	6.1	3.8	—	Bridge	—	Bridge over West Oder
Poland	West Pomeranian Voivodeship	Szczecin	8.4	5.2	—	Bridge	—	Bridge over East Oder (Regalica)
Poland	West Pomeranian Voivodeship	Szczecin	9.3	5.8	—	Radziszewo	DK 31 – Szczecin / Kostrzyn nad Odrą	Speed limit to 90 kph • No acceleration lanes • No decceleration lanes
Poland	West Pomeranian Voivodeship	Szczecin	11	6.8	—	Klucz interchange	S 3 / E65 – Gorzów Wielkopolski, Poznań	Southwestern terminus of S3 and E65 overlap Semi-directional T interchange
Poland	West Pomeranian Voivodeship	Szczecin	15.5	9.6	—	Szczecin Podjuchy	local road – Szczecin-Podjuchy	Podjuchy is a municipal neighbourhood of Szczecin Access to Morwowa Street
Poland	West Pomeranian Voivodeship	Szczecin	18.3	11.4	—	Viaduct in Klęskowo	—	The longest bridge on the motorway; 242 metres (0.150 mi) in length
Poland	West Pomeranian Voivodeship	Szczecin	21.5	13.4	—	Szczecin Kijewo interchange	DK 10 – Szczecin-Centrum, Lubieszyn / Bydgoszcz, Pyrzyce	Cloverleaf interchange with collector-distributor roads; Centrum means center Former northeast terminus
Poland	West Pomeranian Voivodeship	Szczecin	23.5	14.6	—	Viaduct	—	Viaduct over Szczecin–Poznań railway
Poland	West Pomeranian Voivodeship	Szczecin	24.4	15.2	—	Szczecin Dąbie	local road – Szczecin-Dąbie, Wielgowo	Dąbie and Wielgowo are municipal neighbourhoods of Szczecin
Poland	West Pomeranian Voivodeship	Gmina Goleniów	28.2	17.5	—		S 3 / E65 – Goleniów, Świnoujście S 6 / E28 – Goleniów, Gdańsk	• Northeastern terminus of the motorway, according to signage • Northeastern terminus of E28 overlap Road continues as common section of expressways S3 (E65) and S6 (E28) with kilometrage of S3
1.000 mi = 1.609 km; 1.000 km = 0.621 mi: Concurrency terminus; Proposed; Route transition

== See also ==
- European route E28
- Expressway S6 (Poland)
- Highways in Poland
