= Klandorf =

#REDIRECT Schorfheide, Brandenburg

- From a more specific geographic name: This is a redirect from a geographic location that usually includes extraneous identifiers such as the county or region of a city. These redirects are mainly used to conform to Wikipedia conventions on geographic location article titles.
