= Bukowe-Klęskowo =

- Municipal neighbourhood
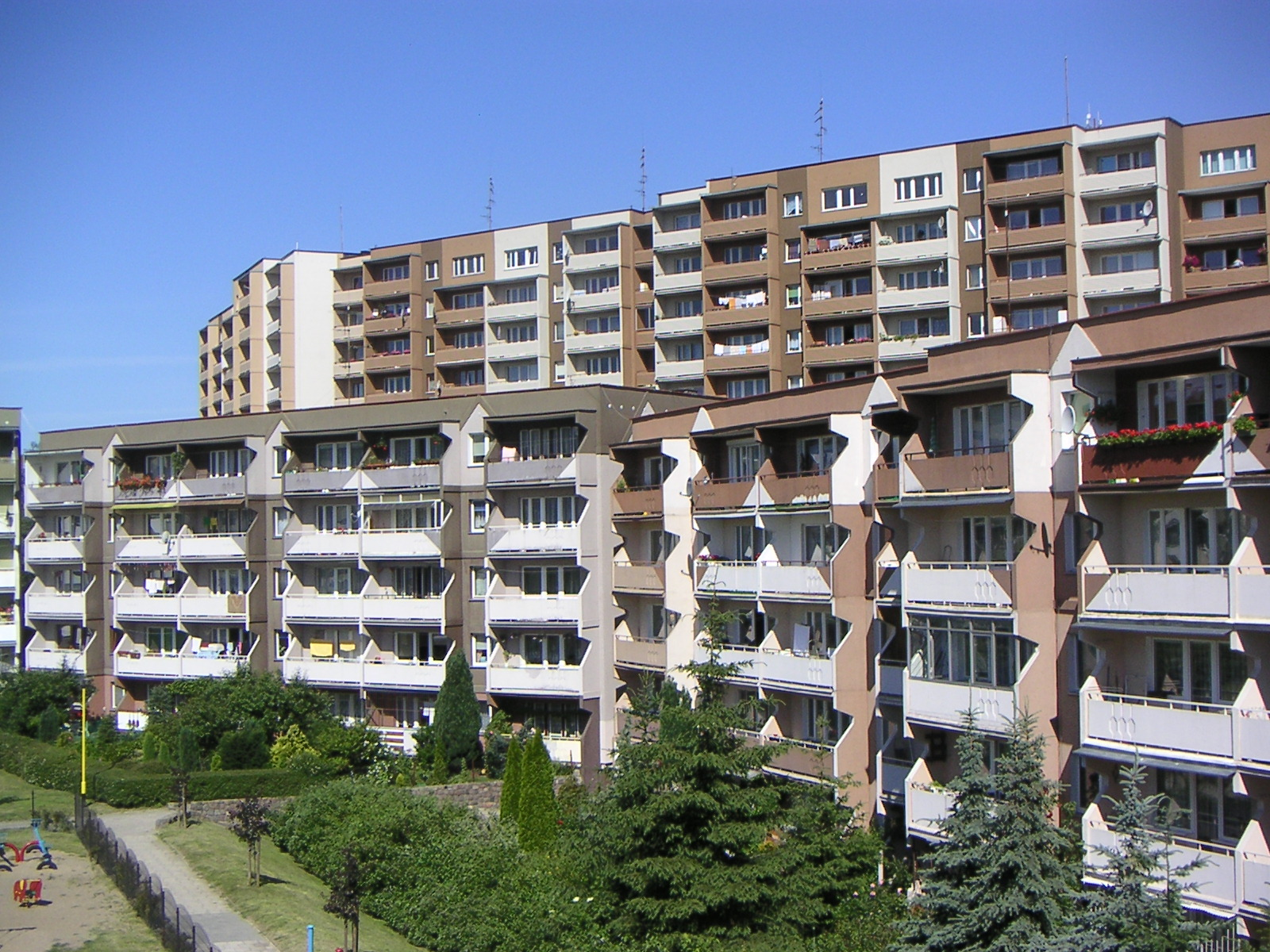
- Buildings in Bukowe-Klęskowo

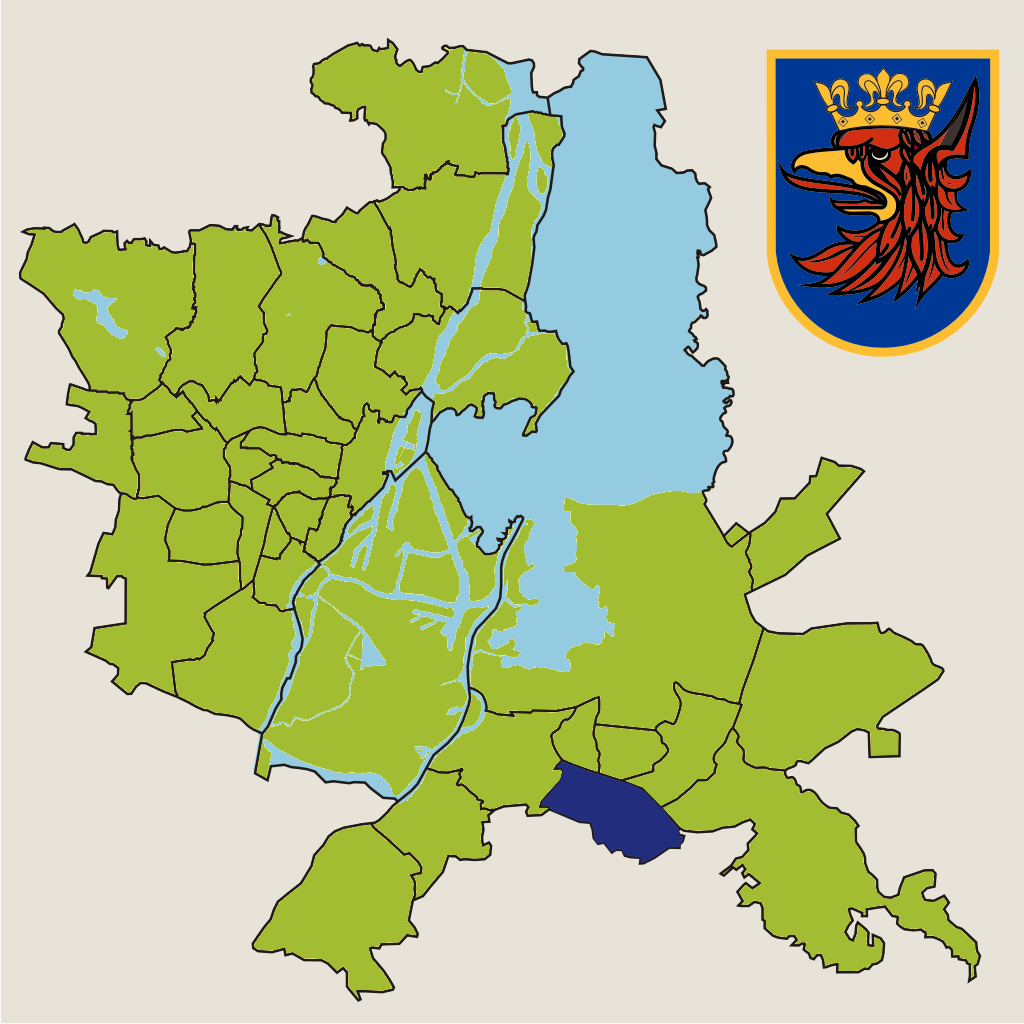
- Location of Bukowe-Klęskowo within Szczecin
- Coordinates: 53°21′57″N 14°39′41″E
- Country: Poland
- Voivodeship: West Pomeranian
- County/City: Szczecin

Area
  - Total: 4.6 km^{2} (1.8 sq mi)

Population (2011)
  - Total: 14,441
  - Density: 3,100/km^{2} (8,100/sq mi)
- Time zone: UTC+1 (CET)
  - Summer (DST): UTC+2 (CEST)
- Area code: +48 91
- Car plates: ZS

Bukowe-Klęskowo is a municipal neighbourhood of the city of Szczecin, Poland situated on the right bank of Oder river, south-east of the Szczecin Old Town, and Middle Town. As of April 2011 it had a population of 14,441.

Bukowe-Klęskowo comprises Bukowe and Klęskowo.
