= Grzechotki =

- Village
- Interactive map of Grzechotki
- Location within Poland
- Coordinates: 54°25′13″N 20°1′58″E
- Country: Poland
- Voivodeship: Warmian-Masurian
- County: Braniewo
- Gmina: Braniewo
- Population: 73
- Time zone: UTC+1 (CET)
  - Summer (DST): UTC+2 (CEST)
- Vehicle registration: NBR

Grzechotki [ɡʐɛˈxɔtki] is a village in the administrative district of Gmina Braniewo, within Braniewo County, Warmian-Masurian Voivodeship, in northern Poland, close to the border with the Kaliningrad Oblast of Russia.

The Grzechotki border checkpoint is the largest road border crossing between Poland and Russia, at 22 traffic lanes. It is accessible via European route E28 and Polish expressway S22, east of the Grzechotki village.
