= Wielgowo =

Neighbourhood of Szczecin, Poland

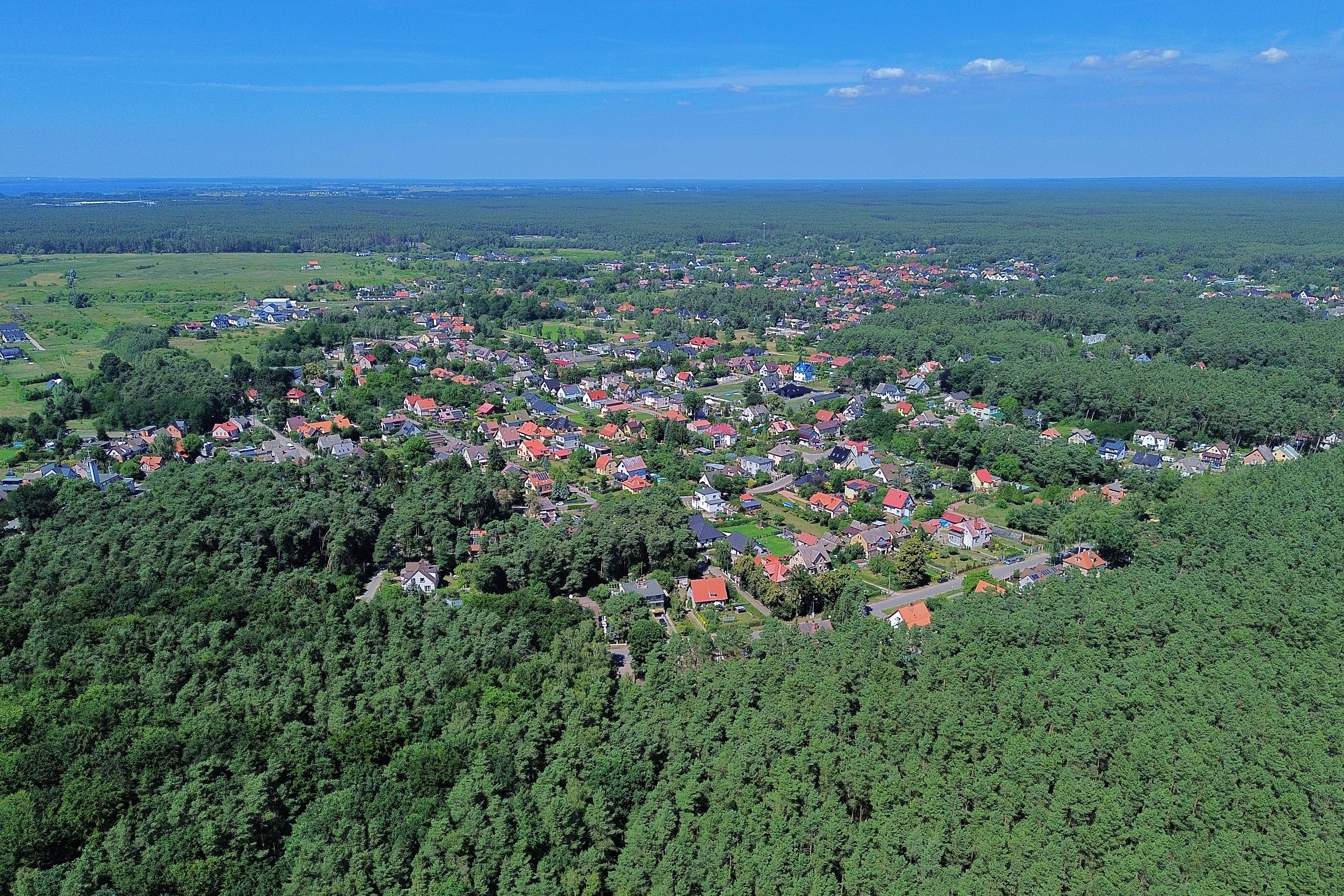
- Aerial view of Wielgowo from the south

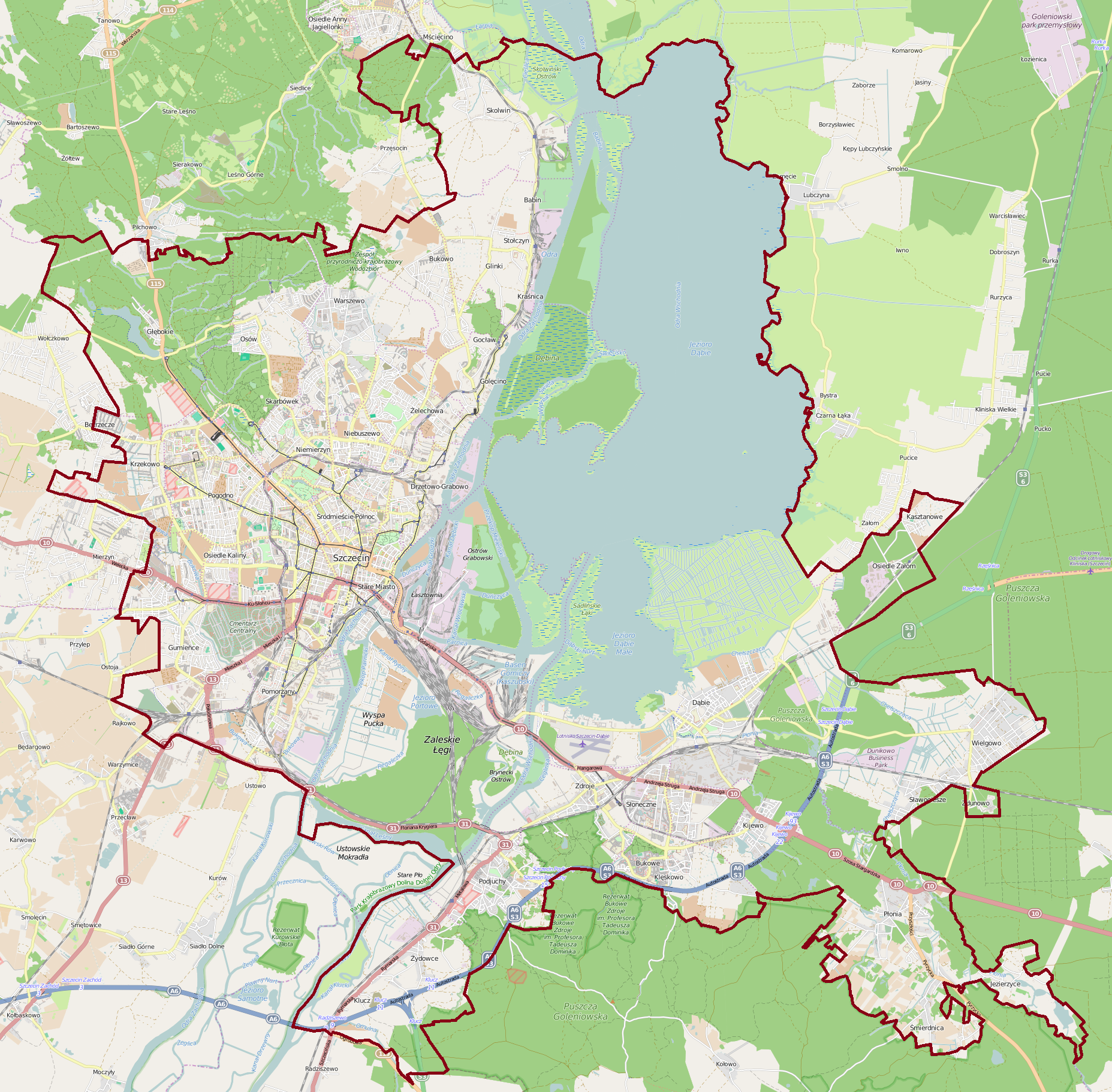
- Location within Szczecin Location within Poland
- Coordinates: 53.3945°N 14.7721°E
- Country: Poland
- Voivodeship: West Pomeranian
- County/City: Szczecin
- Time zone: UTC+1 (CET)
  - Summer (DST): UTC+2 (CEST)
- Vehicle registration: ZS

Wielgowo is a part of the city of Szczecin, Poland situated on the right bank of Oder river, east of the Szczecin Old Town, and Szczecin-Dąbie.

== History ==
The area became part of the emerging Duchy of Poland under its first ruler Mieszko I around 967. Following Poland's fragmentation after the death of Bolesław III Wrymouth in 1138 it became part of an independent Duchy of Pomerania, which in 1227 became part of the Holy Roman Empire. The settlement was known as Augustwalde. During the Thirty Years' War, the settlement fell to the Swedish Empire. Later on, it passed to Prussia, and from 1871 to 1945 it was part of unified Germany.
