= Expressway S22 (Poland) =

Expressway in Poland connecting Elbląg with Russia

Expressway S22
- Droga ekspresowa S22

Route information
- Part of E28
- Maintained by GDDKiA
- Length: 50.6 km (31.4 mi)

Major junctions
- North end: Russian border
- South end: S 7 near Elbląg

Location
- Country: Poland
- Major cities: Elbląg

Highway system
- National roads in Poland; Voivodeship roads
← S 19	→ S 50

Expressway S22 or Express Road S22 (in Polish Droga ekspresowa S22) is a single carriageway express road running from Elbląg to the border with Russia at Grzechotki-Mamonovo (54.422°N 20.069°E), where it connects to a Russian road that continues to Kaliningrad. The border crossing on the road opened in December 2010 and is the largest one on the Polish-Russian border, making S22 the key transport connection between the European Union and the Kaliningrad Oblast.

The road follows the route of a German single carriageway autobahn between Elbląg (Elbing) and Kaliningrad (Königsberg) built in the 1930s, known informally as Berlinka. The old autobahn was completely reconstructed and opened as an express road in September 2008. In the course of the upgrade, the new modern carriageway was built in the space that had been left for the second carriageway during the construction in the 1930s, then the original concrete carriageway was demolished along almost the entire length. All of the remaining original overpasses and bridges were demolished and replaced with modern works. Thus nowadays very few traces of the original German autobahn can be seen.

The construction of the road cost 483 mln PLN, of which over one third was provided by the European Union.

Country	Voivodeship	Location	km	mi	Exit	Name	Destinations	Notes
Poland	Warmian-Masurian Voivodeship	Elbląg	407.4	253.1	-	Elbląg Wschód	S 7 / E28 / E77 – Gdańsk, Nowy Dwór Gd. DK 22 - Malbork, Chojnice DW 500 - Ostróda, Warsaw	Start of joined Section with E28
Poland	Warmian-Masurian Voivodeship	Gmina Milejewo	413.9	257.2	-	Młynary	DW 509 - Elbląg, Młynary	Formerly Pomorska Wieś, Wilkowo
Poland	Warmian-Masurian Voivodeship	Nowe Monasterzysko			-	Milejewo		
Poland	Warmian-Masurian Voivodeship	Gmina Młynary	427	265	-	Frombork	DW 505 - Pasłęk, Frombork	Formerly Błudowo
Poland	Warmian-Masurian Voivodeship	Gmina Płoskinia	435.7	270.7	-	Braniewo Południe	DK 54 - Braniewo, Gronowo DW 506 - Nowica	Formerly Chruściel
Poland	Warmian-Masurian Voivodeship	Gmina Braniewo	447.2	277.9	-	Braniewo Północ	DW 507 - Braniewo, Dobre Miasto	Formerly Maciejewo
Poland	Warmian-Masurian Voivodeship	Grzechotki	456.6	283.7	-	Grzechotki - Mamonovo II	R 516 / E28 - Kaliningrad, Vilnius, Klaipėda	Closed border crossing Grzechotki - Mamonovo II
