= Klęskowo, Szczecin =

Neighbourhood of Szczecin, Poland

Klęskowo
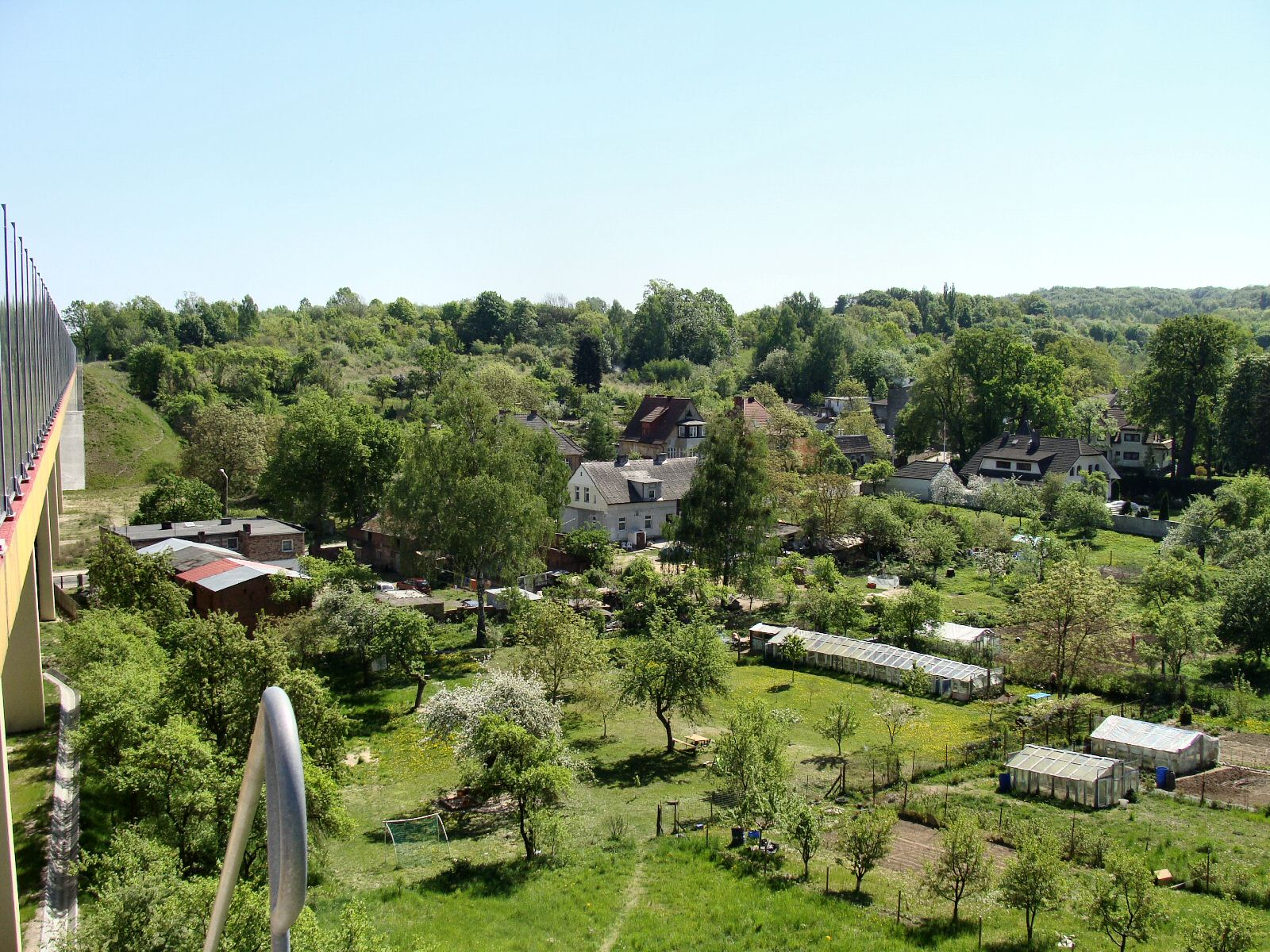
- View of Klęskowo and Wzgórza Bukowe from the motorway viaduct

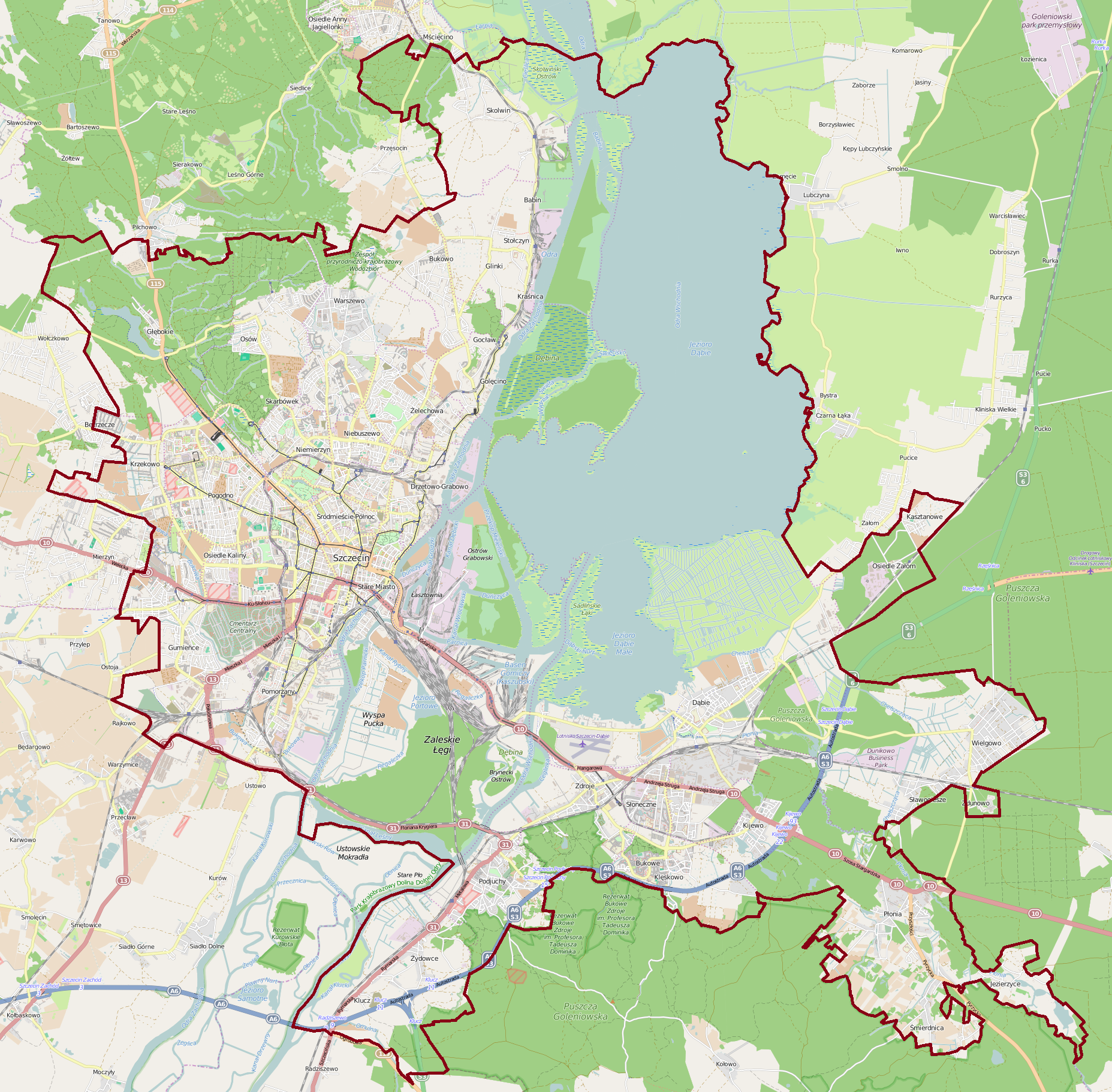
- Location within Szczecin Location within Poland
- Coordinates: 53.3640°N 14.6603°E
- Country: Poland
- Voivodeship: West Pomeranian
- County/City: Szczecin
- Neighbourhood: Bukowe-Klęskowo
- Time zone: UTC+1 (CET)
  - Summer (DST): UTC+2 (CEST)
- Vehicle registration: ZS

Klęskowo (formerly German: Hökendorf) is a part of the city of Szczecin, Poland situated on the right bank of Oder river, east of the Szczecin Old Town, and south of Szczecin-Dąbie.

The village was founded by Germans. In 1274, knight Jacob von Staffelde sold the place to the Abbey Kolbatz], which settled German peasants.

Having been part of German states since the Middle Ages, it fell to Poland in 1945. The Communist rulers expelled all German inhabitants.
