= Łęgowo, Pomeranian Voivodeship =

Łęgowo
- Village
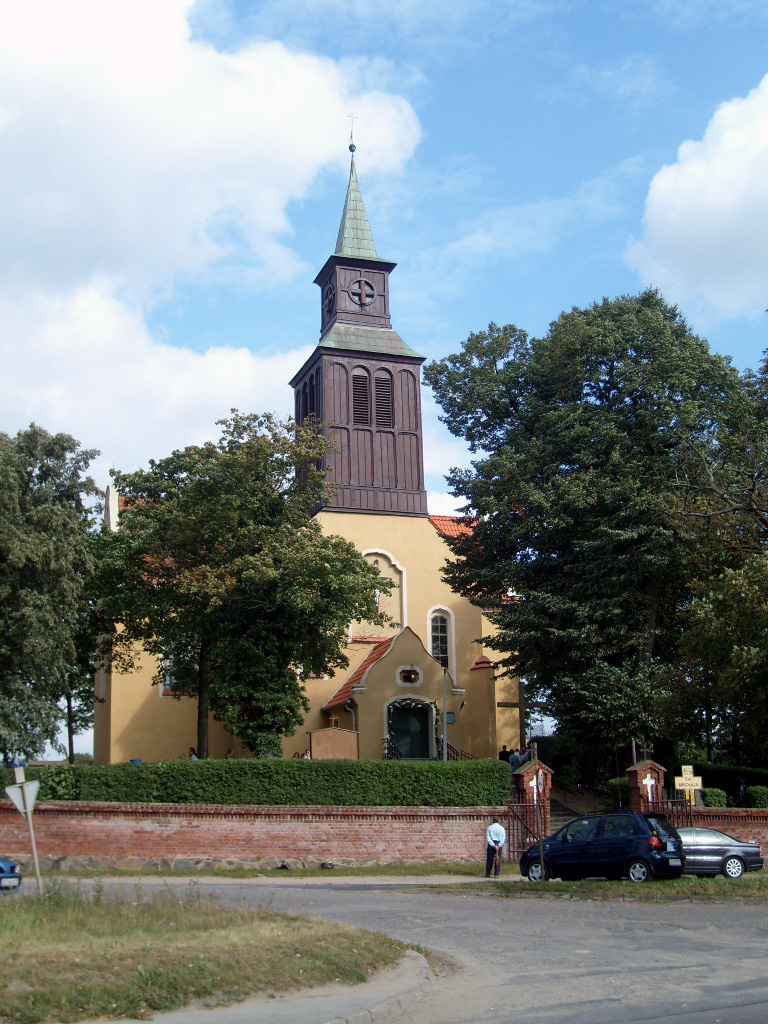
- Church of Saint Nicholas

- Location within Poland
- Coordinates: 54°13′33″N 18°38′33″E
- Country: Poland
- Voivodeship: Pomeranian
- County: Gdańsk
- Gmina: Pruszcz Gdański

Population
  - Total: 2,850
- Time zone: UTC+1 (CET)
  - Summer (DST): UTC+2 (CEST)
- Vehicle registration: GDA

Łęgowo [wɛnˈɡɔvɔ] is a village in the administrative district of Gmina Pruszcz Gdański, within Gdańsk County, Pomeranian Voivodeship, in northern Poland.

== History ==
Łęgowo is an old village pre-dating the Christianization of Poland. A pagan cemetery was discovered nearby. In 1303, it was granted by the Swienca family to the Oliwa Abbey. During the Thirteen Years' War (1454–1466), the village was attacked by the Teutonic Knights in 1459 and 1460. After the Battle of Chojnice (1656) during the Swedish invasion of Poland, Łęgowo was the site of the main encampment of the Polish army led by King John II Casimir Vasa, while the King himself stayed in Gdańsk for several weeks. A new church was built in 1748 and a hospital for the poor was established in 1749.
