= Lotnisko, Szczecin =

Neighbourhood of Szczecin, Poland

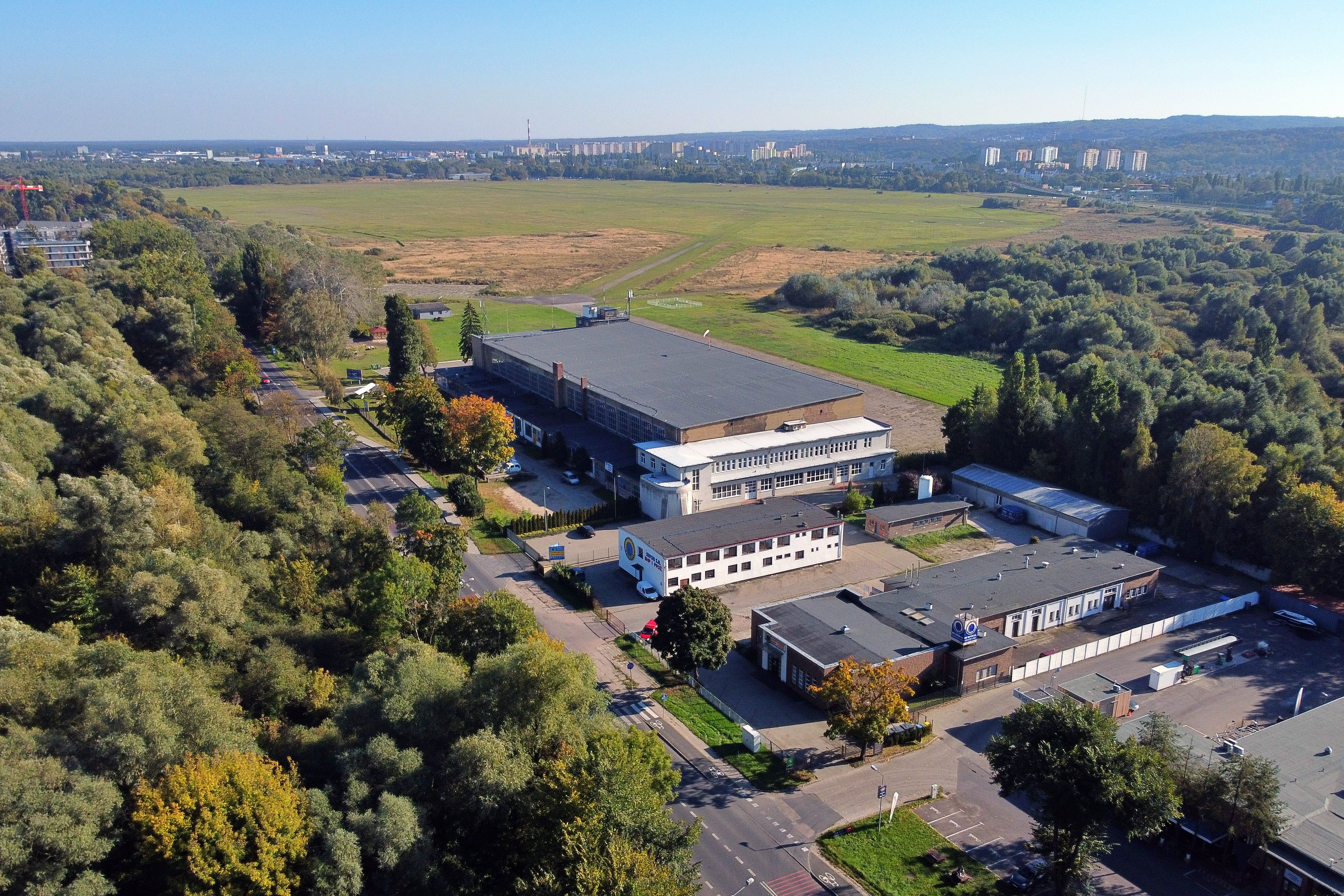
Szczecin-Dąbie Airstrip located within the neighbourhood of Lotnisko, in 2021.

Lotnisko (Note: German until 1945: Flughafen) is a neighbourhood of the city of Szczecin, Poland, located within the municipal neighbourhood (city district) of Dąbie. It is situated on right bank of Oder river. It is uninhabited and is centred around the Szczecin-Dąbie Airstrip.
