= Solidarity Szczecin–Goleniów Airport =

Solidarity Szczecin–Goleniów Airport Port Lotniczy Szczecin–Goleniów im. NSZZ Solidarność

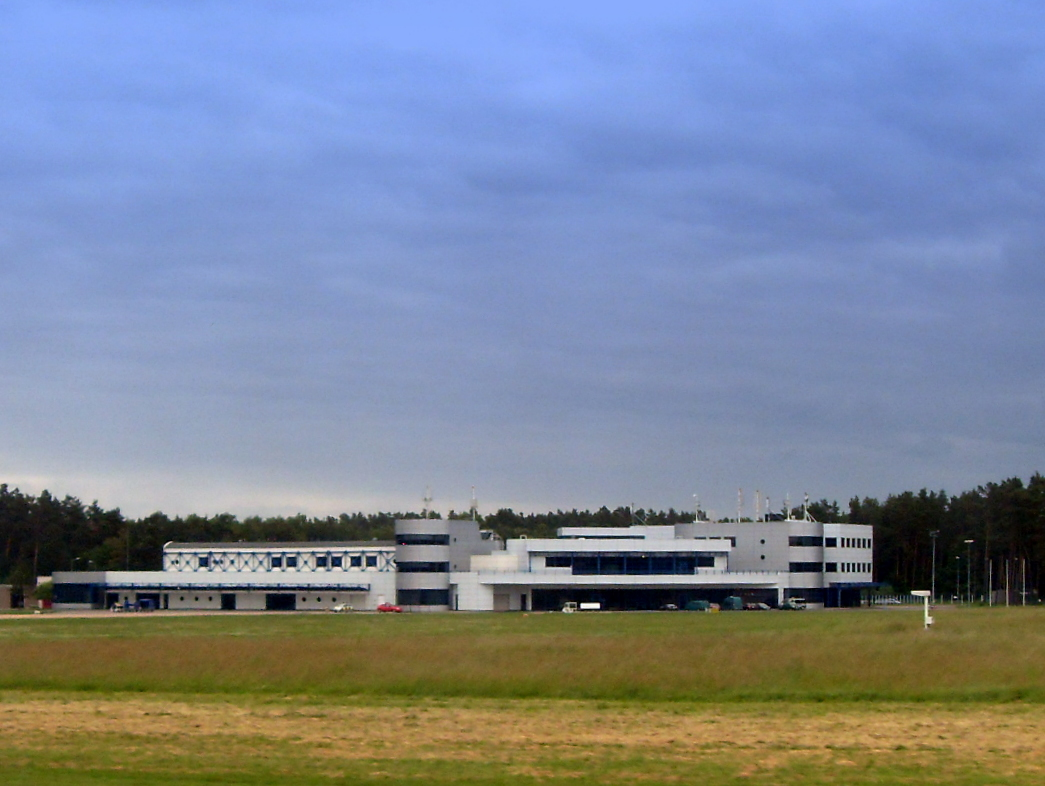
- IATA: SZZ; ICAO: EPSC

Summary
- Airport type: Public
- Operator: Szczecin–Goleniów Airport Ltd.
- Serves: Szczecin, Poland
- Location: Goleniów
- Elevation AMSL: 47 m (154 ft)
- Coordinates: 53°35′05″N 014°54′08″E
- Website: airport.com.pl

Map
- Location of airport in Poland

Runways
| Direction | Length | | Surface |
| Direction | m | ft | Surface |
|---|---|---|---|
| 13/31 | 2,500 | 8,202 | Asphalt |

Statistics (2018)
- Passengers: ▲598,971
- Aircraft movements: ▲8,757
- Cargo (tonnes): ▲574
- Source: Polish AIP at EUROCONTROL Statistics: Polish Civil Aviation Office

Solidarity Szczecin–Goleniów Airport (Polish:Port Lotniczy Szczecin–Goleniów im. NSZZ Solidarność (IATA: SZZ) is the main domestic and international airport serving the city of Szczecin in Poland and is located 45 km (28 mi) northeast of the city, near the town of Goleniów, in the village of Glewice. About 1.6 million residents live within its catchment area.

== History ==
=== Early years ===
The airport was constructed between 1953 and 1956 at the height of the Cold War, 5 km (3.1 mi) east of Goleniów. It was constructed as a standard military airport with a 1,800 m × 45 m (5,906 ft × 148 ft) runway and basic airport infrastructure (hangars, air traffic control tower, etc.). In 1967, the civilian airport at Dąbie was relocated to the site and named Port Lotniczy Szczecin–Goleniów. In 1976–77, the runway was extended to 2,500 m (8,202 ft) and a new passenger terminal was constructed.

=== Development since the 1990s ===
Works to improve the runway and the main apron were undertaken in 1998. The airport's electricity supply together with the runway and approach lighting was upgraded in 1999. A new passenger terminal was opened in 2001 and further expansion works commenced on the terminal in 2005. Construction commenced on a new air traffic control tower in 2004, and was finished by the end of 2005. The terminal expansion concluded in April 2006, at which time the airport was renamed for the Solidarność trade union.

In July 2013, a 4 km spur linking the airport to the mainline between Szczecin and Kołobrzeg opened, creating a direct rail link between the airport and the city of Szczecin. There are up to 8 trains a day covering the route between Szczecin and the airport using the new 4 km spur, with the journey from Szczecin Main railway station taking approximately 50 minutes.

== Airlines and destinations ==
The following airlines operate regular scheduled and charter flights to and from Szczecin–Goleniów Airport:

| Airlines | Destinations |
|---|---|
| LOT Polish Airlines | Warsaw–Chopin |
| Ryanair | Liverpool, London–Stansted; Seasonal: Dublin, Kraków |
| Wizz Air | Bergen, Oslo |

== Passenger statistics ==
Traffic by calendar year
| | Passengers | Change | Movements | Cargo (tonnes) |
|---|---|---|---|---|
| 2007 | 231,711 | ▲15.1% | 9,790 | 1,235.88 |
| 2008 | 297,027 | ▲28.2% | 11,808 | 488.56 |
| 2009 | 296,234 | ▼0.3% | 11,009 | 181.37 |
| 2010 | 280,213 | ▼5.4% | 11,258 | 118.56 |
| 2011 | 262,089 | ▼6.5% | 10,395 | 142.93 |
| 2012 | 356,006 | ▲35.8% | 11,767 | 77.57 |
| 2013 | 323,744 | ▼9.1% | 11,152 | 40.79 |
| 2014 | 287,029 | ▼11.3% | 8,253 | 21.4 |
| 2015 | 412,547 | ▲44.2% | 8,326 | 65.95 |
| 2016 | 467,877 | ▲13.4% | 8,757 | 574.9 |
| 2017 | 578,691 | ▲23.7% | 8,038 | 149.89 |
| 2018 | 598,971 | ▲3.5% | 9,133 | 37.33 |
| 2019 | 576,072 | ▼3.8% | 8,897 | 10.95 |
| 2020 | 184,802 | ▼67.9% | 5,706 | 4.57 |
| 2021 | 181,886 | ▼1.6% | 6,435 | 8.37 |
| 2022 | 419,905 | ▲130.9% | 9,370 | 70.27 |
| 2023 | 477,494 | ▲13.7% | 9,208 | 90.89 |

== Ground transportation ==
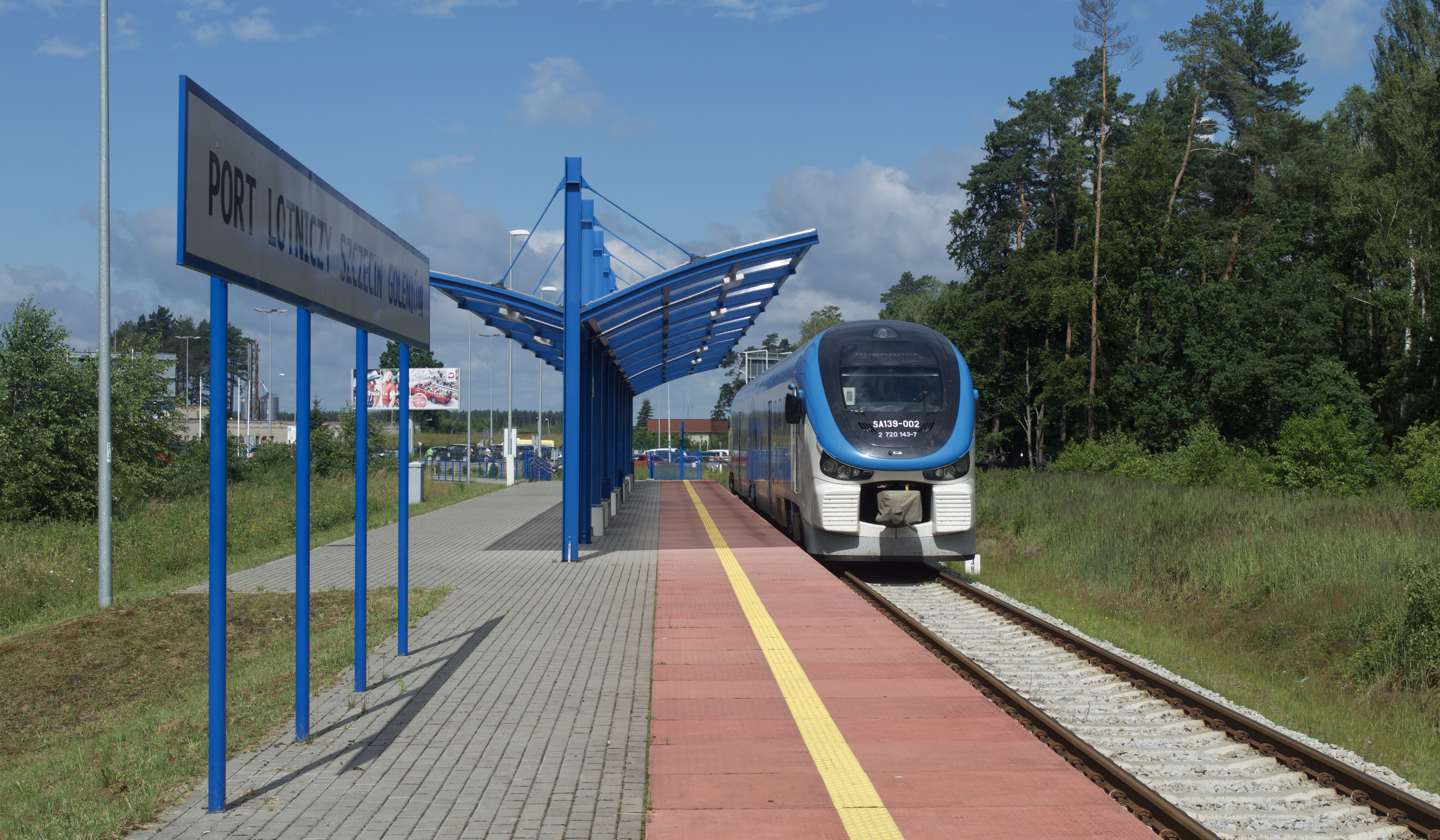
A Polregio Pesa Link train at Port Lotniczy Szczecin Goleniów

=== Rail ===
The airport is served by Port Lotniczy Szczecin Goleniów railway station, which is served by Polregio trains.

=== Road ===
The airport is located 45 km away from Szczecin using the S3 and A6. Coaches are also available.

== See also ==
- List of airports in Poland
- Air ambulances in Poland
