= Mamonovka =

Mamonovka German: Bahnau Polish: Banówka Russian: Мамоновка
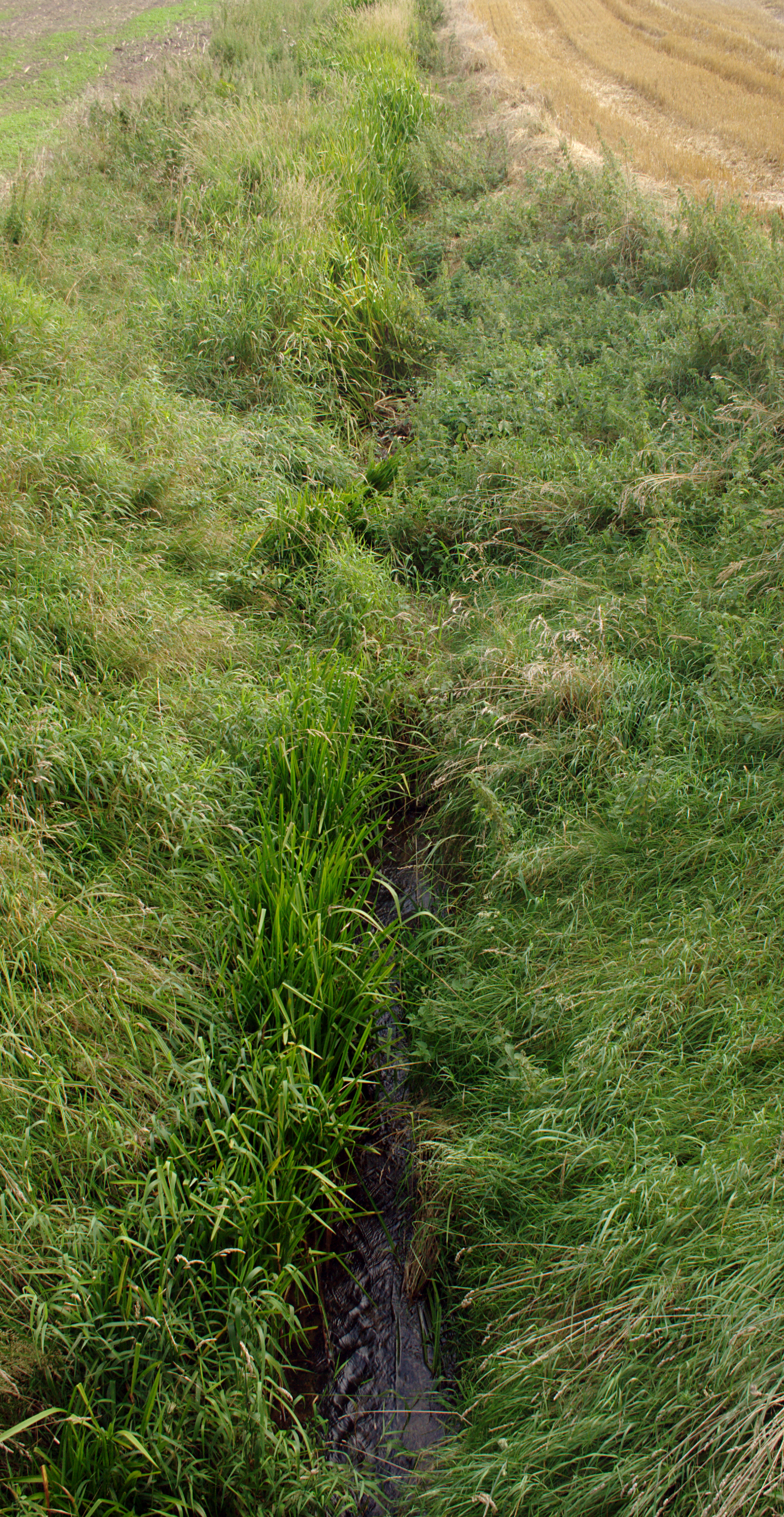

Location
- Country: Russia; Poland

Physical characteristics
- Source
  - location: near Wysoka Braniewska, Warmian–Masurian Voivodeship, Poland
  - elevation: 110 m (360 ft)
- Mouth: Vistula Lagoon
  - location: west of Baltiysk, Kaliningrad Oblast, Russia
  - coordinates: 54°29′00″N 19°52′01″E
  - elevation: 0 m (0 ft)
- Length: 49.57 km (30.80 mi)
- Basin size: 214.9 m^{2} (2,313 ft^{2})
- Discharge
  - average: 1.2 m^{3}/s (42 cu ft/s)

The Mamonovka or Banovka (Russian: Мамоновка, Polish: Banówka, German: Bahnau) is a river between Russia (Kaliningrad Oblast) and Poland (Warmian-Masurian Voivodship). It flows into the Vistula Lagoon. It is 51 km long and has a 311 km^{2} drainage basin.

The Ignatievka River and the Vitushka River are tributaries of the Mamonovka.
