= Schorfheide, Brandenburg =

Schorfheide
- Municipality
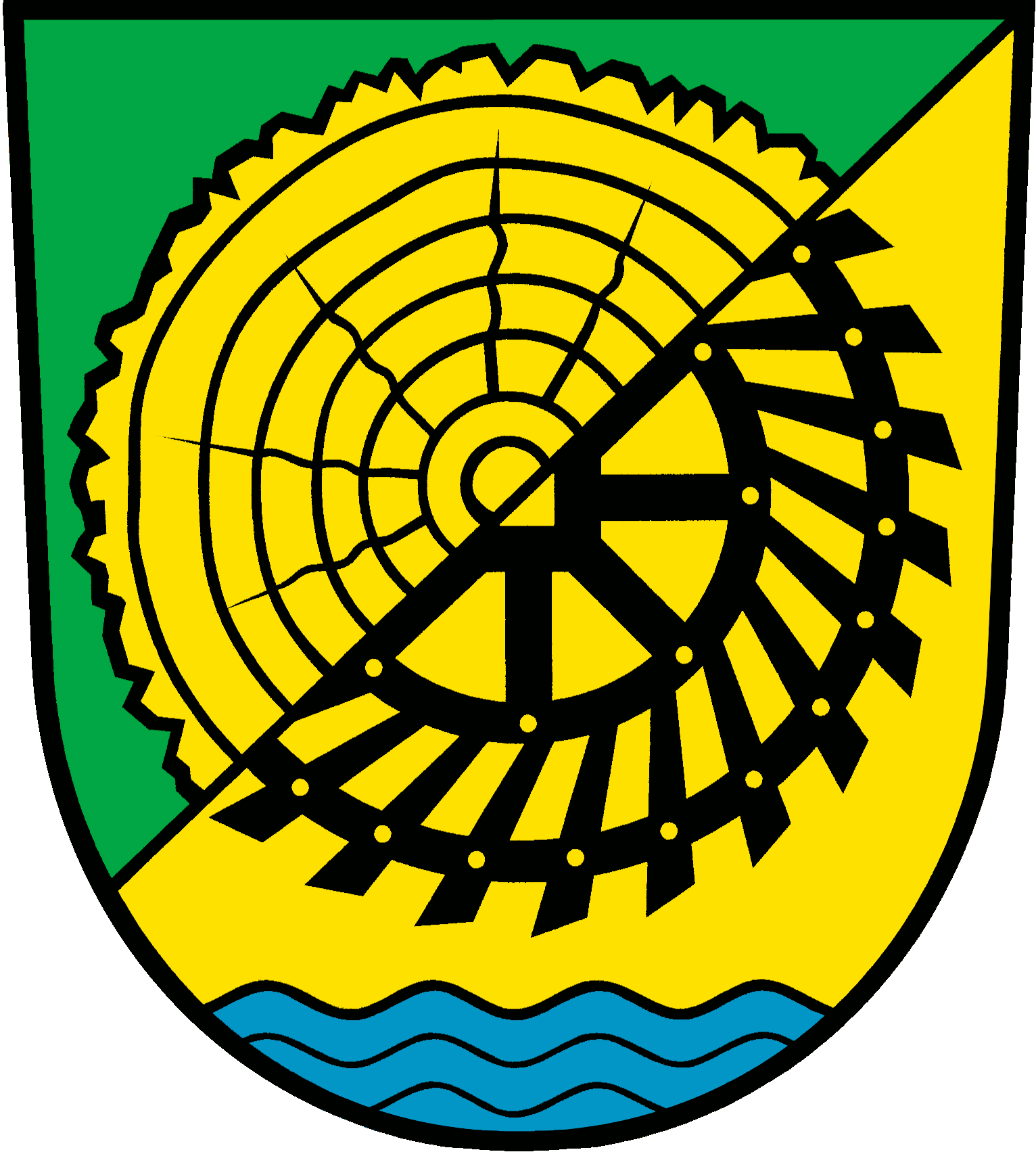
- Coat of arms

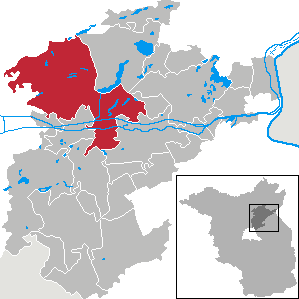
- Location of Schorfheide within Barnim district
- Interactive map of Schorfheide
- Location within Germany Location within Brandenburg
- Coordinates: 52°54′N 13°31′E
- Country: Germany
- State: Brandenburg
- District: Barnim
- Subdivisions: 9 Ortsteile

Government
  - Mayor (2019–27): Wilhelm Westerkamp (Ind.)

Area
  - Total: 238.18 km^{2} (91.96 sq mi)
- Elevation: 29 m (95 ft)

Population (2025-12-31)
  - Total: 10,520
  - Density: 44.17/km^{2} (114.4/sq mi)
- Time zone: UTC+01:00 (CET)
  - Summer (DST): UTC+02:00 (CEST)
- Postal codes: 16230, 16244, 16348
- Dialling codes: 03334, 03335
- Vehicle registration: BAR
- Website: Official site (in German)

Schorfheide (German pronunciation: [ˈʃɔʁfhaɪdə]) is a municipality in the Barnim district of Brandenburg, Germany. It was established in 2003 by the merger of Finowfurt and Groß Schönebeck.

== History ==
On 26 October 2003, the municipality of Schorfheide was formed by merging the municipalities of Finowfurt and Groß Schönebeck.

From 1815 to 1947, Finowfurt and Groß Schönebeck were part of the Prussian Province of Brandenburg, from 1947 to 1952 of the State of Brandenburg, from 1952 to 1990 of the East German Bezirk Frankfurt and since 1990 again of Brandenburg, since 2003 united as the municipality of Schorfheide.

== Overview ==
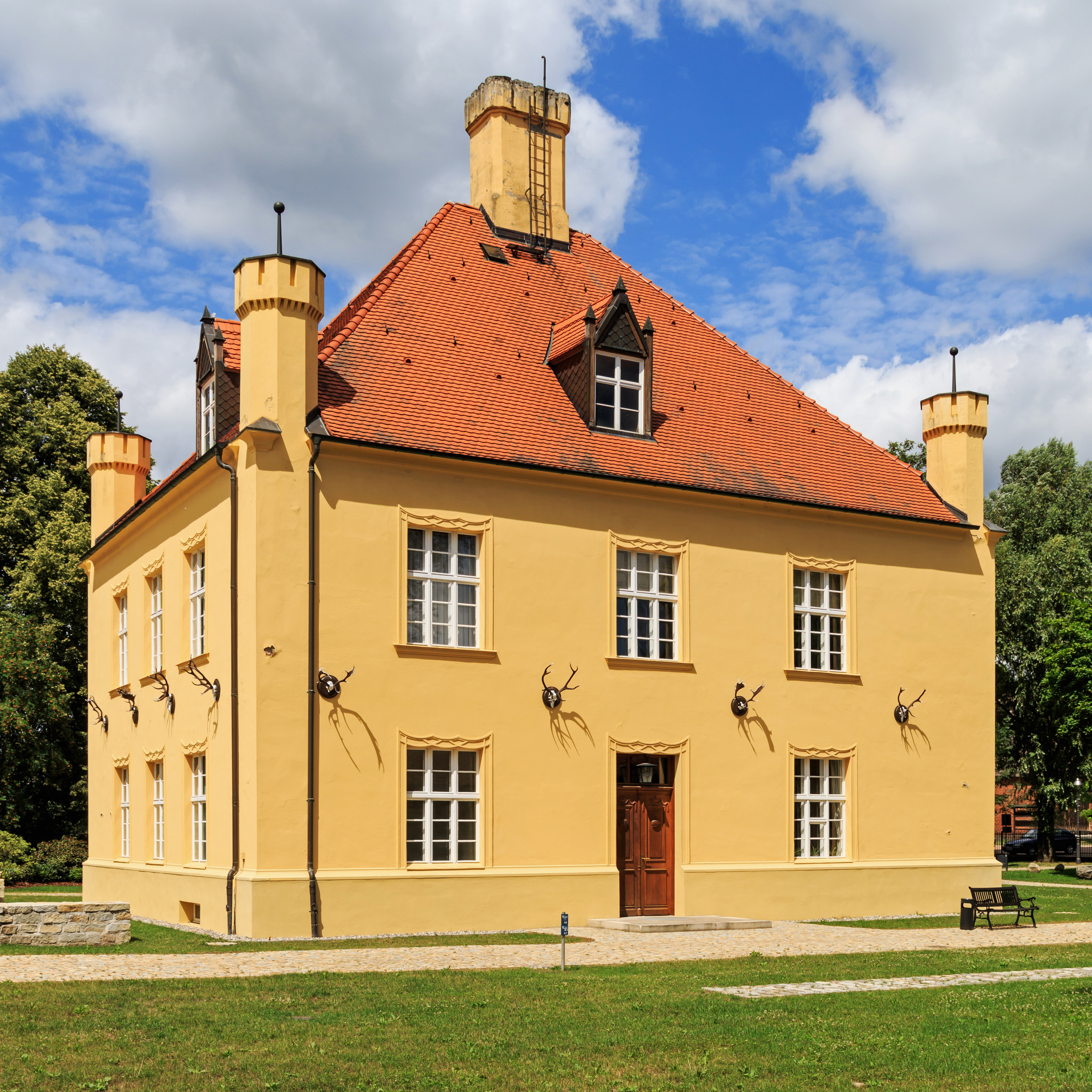
Groß Schönebeck hunting lodge

Schorfheide further comprises the villages of Altenhof, Böhmerheide, Eichhorst, Klandorf, Lichterfelde, Schluft and Werbellin. It is situated immediately west of the district's capital Eberswalde and about 40 km (25 mi) northeast of the Berlin city centre. Schorfheide is the largest municipality of Barnim by area. Large parts belong to the Schorfheide-Chorin Biosphere Reserve.

In the 13th century the Ascanian margraves of Brandenburg built a castle at the southern end of the Werbellinsee. In 1879 Prince Charles of Prussia had the Ascania Tower erected at the site. Groß Schönebeck houses a hunting lodge erected from 1680 at the behest of the Brandenburg Elector Frederick William I of Hohenzollern, now a museum. From 1950 until 1989 Altenhof was the site of the Pionierrepublik Wilhelm Pieck, a large camp of the Ernst Thälmann Pioneer Organisation.

== Demography ==
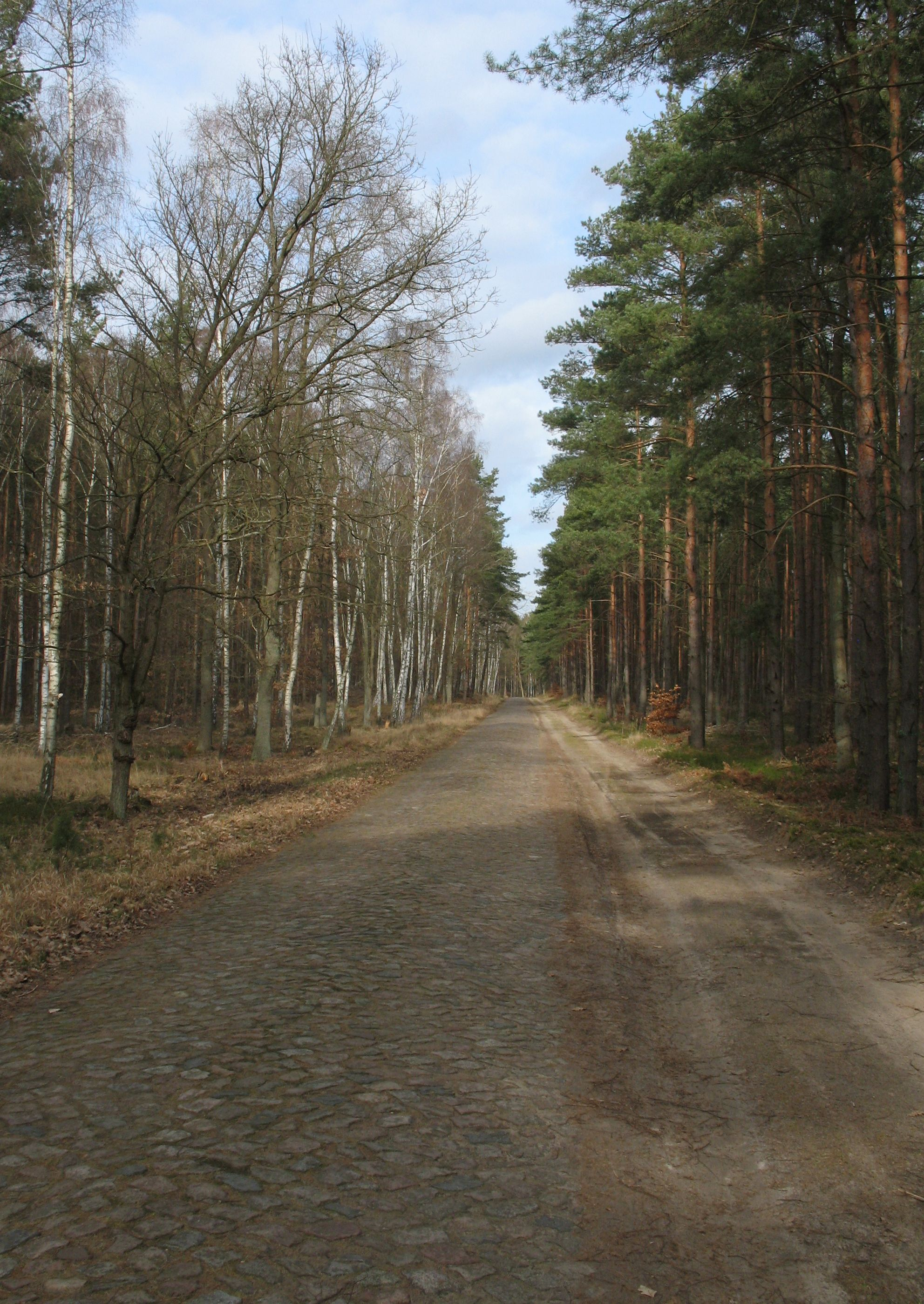
Street near Schluft

Development of Population since 1875 within the Current Boundaries (Blue Line: Population; Dotted Line: Comparison to Population Development of Brandenburg state; Grey Background: Time of Nazi rule; Red Background: Time of Communist rule)

Recent Population Development and Projections (Population Development before Census 2011 (blue line); Recent Population Development according to the Census in Germany in 2011 (blue bordered line); Official projections for 2005-2030 (yellow line); for 2014-2030 (red line); for 2017-2030 (scarlet line)

Schorfheide: Population development
within the current boundaries (2025)

Year	Pop.	±% p.a.
1875	6,223	—
1890	7,440	+1.20%
1910	8,055	+0.40%
1925	8,685	+0.50%
1933	9,978	+1.75%
1939	10,951	+1.56%
1946	12,001	+1.32%

Year	Pop.	±% p.a.
1950	11,943	−0.12%
1964	10,761	−0.74%
1971	10,335	−0.58%
1981	9,377	−0.97%
1985	9,187	−0.51%
1989	9,024	−0.45%
1990	8,974	−0.55%

Year	Pop.	±% p.a.
1995	9,585	+1.33%
2000	10,420	+1.68%
2005	10,397	−0.04%
2010	10,234	−0.32%
2015	9,908	−0.65%
2020	10,191	+0.56%
2025	10,520	+0.64%

== Twin towns ==
- Korschenbroich, Germany
- Mielno, Poland
- Carbonne, France
