= Nadrensee =

- Municipality
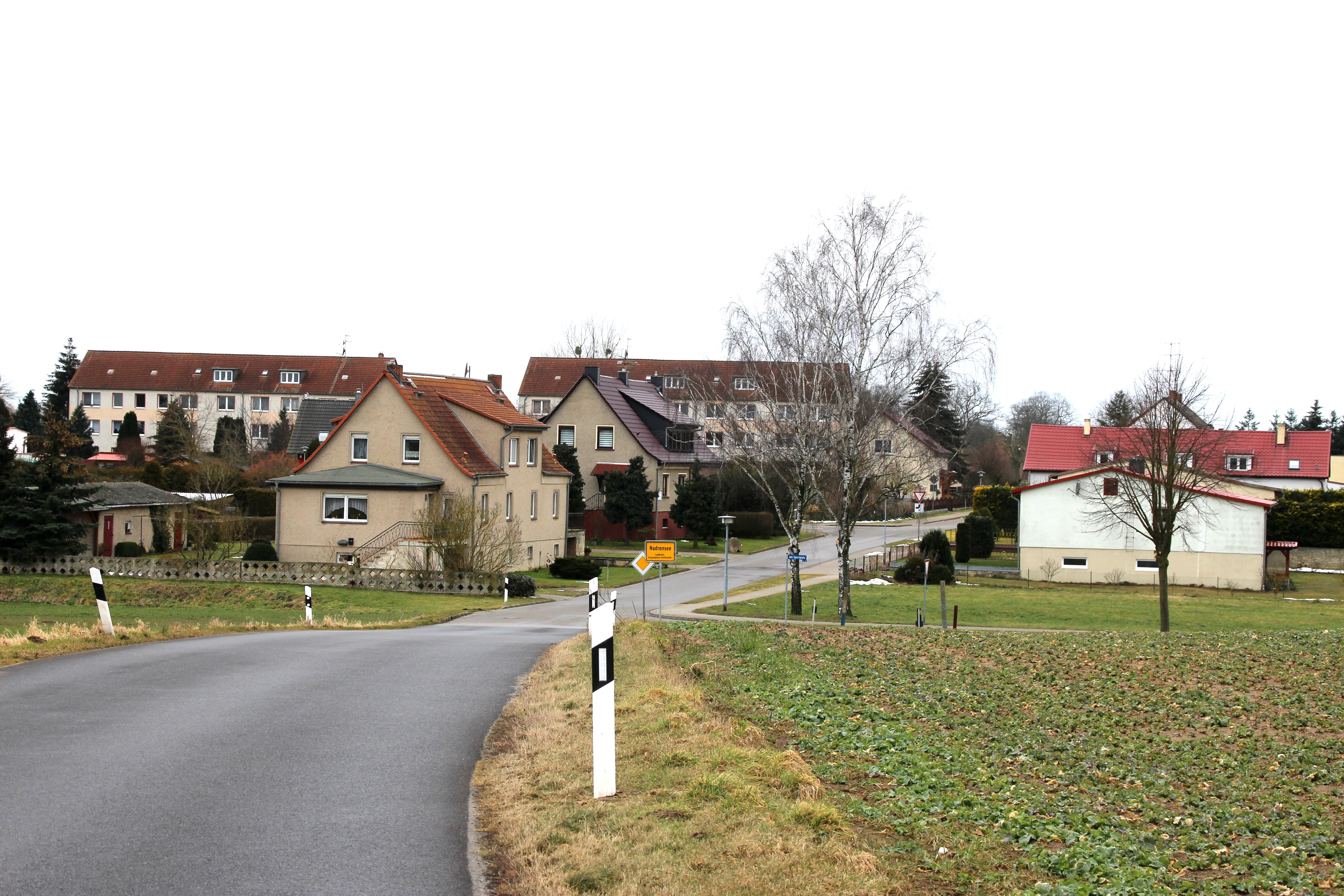

- Location of Nadrensee within Vorpommern-Greifswald district
- Interactive map of Nadrensee
- Location within Germany Location within Mecklenburg-Vorpommern
- Coordinates: 53°19′N 14°21′E
- Country: Germany
- State: Mecklenburg-Vorpommern
- District: Vorpommern-Greifswald
- Municipal assoc.: Löcknitz-Penkun

Government
  - Mayor: Dorina Voß

Area
  - Total: 20.71 km^{2} (8.00 sq mi)
- Elevation: 40 m (130 ft)

Population (2025-12-31)
  - Total: 364
  - Density: 17.6/km^{2} (45.5/sq mi)
- Time zone: UTC+01:00 (CET)
  - Summer (DST): UTC+02:00 (CEST)
- Postal codes: 17329
- Dialling codes: 039746
- Vehicle registration: VG
- Website: www.amt-loecknitz-penkun.de

Nadrensee (Polish: Nadręże) is a municipality in the Vorpommern-Greifswald district, in Mecklenburg-Vorpommern, in north-eastern Germany. It is located in the historic region of Pomerania, on the border with Poland.

According to the 2022 census, Poles constituted 37.1% of the population.
