= Gowienica =

River in Poland

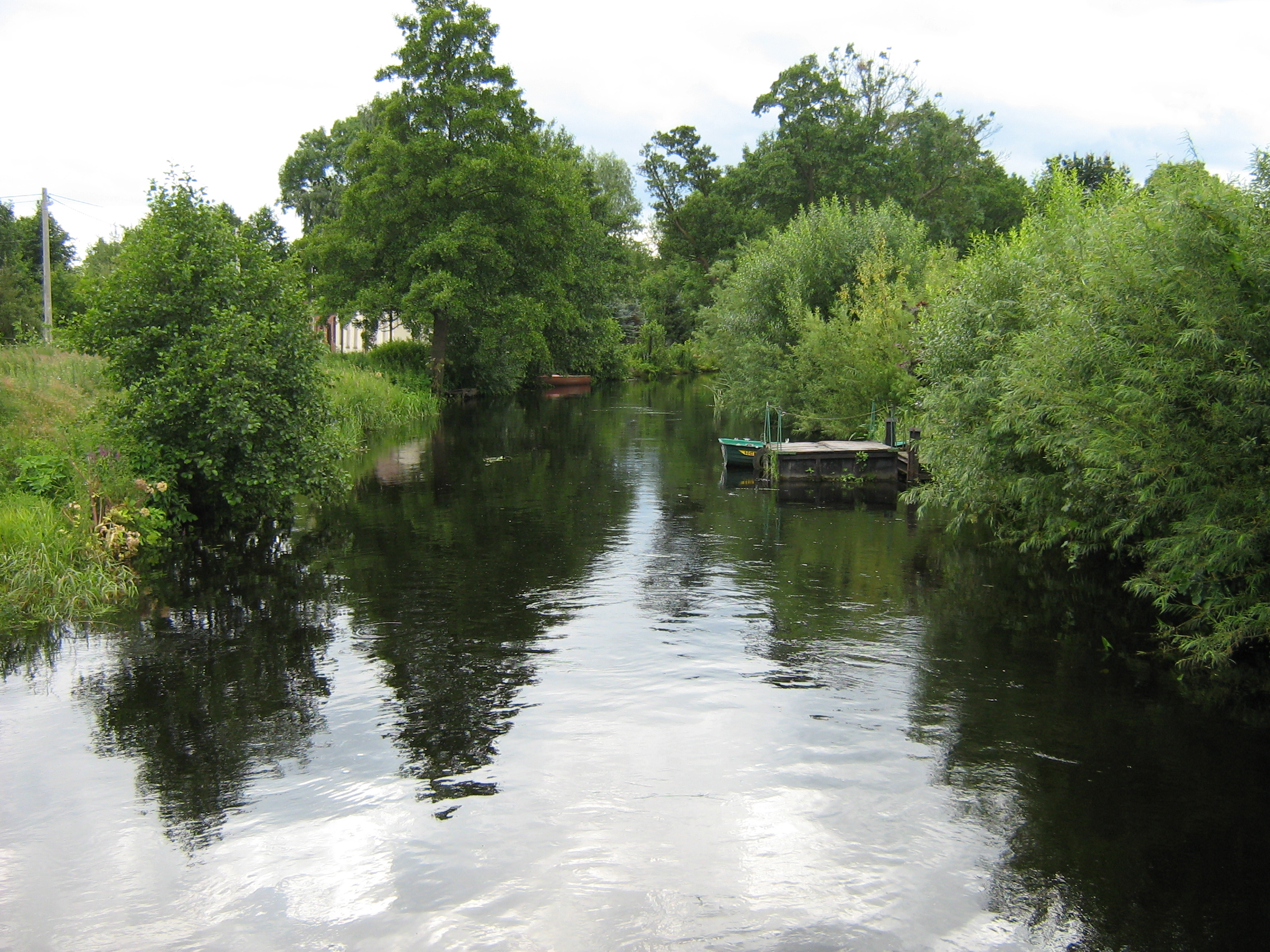
- Gowienica in Stepnica

Location
- Country: Poland
- Voivodeship: West Pomeranian
- County (Powiat): Goleniów

Physical characteristics
- Source
  - location: north of Pogrzymie, Gmina Maszewo
  - coordinates: 53°32′33″N 14°58′55″E
- Mouth: Szczecin Lagoon
  - location: Stepnica, Gmina Stepnica
  - coordinates: 53°39′08″N 14°36′25″E
- Length: 51.09 km (31.75 mi)

Basin features
- Progression: Oder→ Baltic Sea
- Tributaries
  - left: Stepnica

The Gowienica is a river of Poland, a right tributary of the Oder near Stepnica that stretches a length of 51.09 kilometres (31.75 mi). The river flows through Maszewo, Goleniów, Osina, Przybiernów, Stepnica.
