= Łąka, Goleniów County =

Łąka
- Village
- Location within Poland
- Coordinates: 53°45′3″N 14°39′26″E
- Country: Poland
- Voivodeship: West Pomeranian
- County: Goleniów
- Gmina: Stepnica
- Population: 319

Łąka [ˈwɔnka] (German: Lanke) is a village in the administrative district of Gmina Stepnica, within Goleniów County, West Pomeranian Voivodeship, in north western Poland. It lies approximately 11 km (7 mi) north of Stepnica, 25 km (16 mi) north-west of Goleniów, and 38 km (24 mi) north of the regional capital Szczecin. Łąka is considered to be part of the village Racimierz, forming a separate parish. It is situated on the edge of the Goleniowska Plain and the Lower Oder Valley.

The village has a population of 319.
