= Zagórce =

- Village
- Location within Poland
- Coordinates: 53°29′31″N 14°56′2″E
- Country: Poland
- Voivodeship: West Pomeranian
- County: Goleniów
- Gmina: Maszewo

Zagórce [zaˈɡurt͡sɛ] (German: Bergsruh) is a village in the administrative district of Gmina Maszewo, within Goleniów County, West Pomeranian Voivodeship, in north-western Poland. It lies approximately 9 km (6 mi) west of Maszewo, 11 km (7 mi) south-east of Goleniów, and 25 km (16 mi) east of the regional capital Szczecin.

For the history of the region, see History of Pomerania.
