= Korytowo, Goleniów County =

Korytowo
- Village
- Location within Poland
- Coordinates: 53°35′29″N 15°8′57″E
- Country: Poland
- Voivodeship: West Pomeranian
- County: Goleniów
- Gmina: Maszewo

Korytowo [kɔrɨˈtɔvɔ] (formerly German: Walsleben) is a village in the administrative district of Gmina Maszewo, within Goleniów County, West Pomeranian Voivodeship, in north-western Poland. It lies approximately 14 km (9 mi) north-east of Maszewo, 23 km (14 mi) east of Goleniów, and 43 km (27 mi) north-east of the regional capital Szczecin.

For the history of the region, see History of Pomerania.
