= Redostowo =

- Village
- Location within Poland
- Coordinates: 53°38′N 14°59′E
- Country: Poland
- Voivodeship: West Pomeranian
- County: Goleniów
- Gmina: Osina
- Population: 150

Redostowo [rɛdɔsˈtɔvɔ] (German: Retztow) is a village in the administrative district of Gmina Osina, within Goleniów County, West Pomeranian Voivodeship, in north-western Poland. It lies approximately 4 km (2 mi) north-west of Osina, 15 km (9 mi) north-east of Goleniów, and 36 km (22 mi) north-east of the regional capital Szczecin.

For the history of the region, see History of Pomerania.

The village has a population of 150.
