= Bogusławie =

- Village
- Location within Poland
- Coordinates: 53°39′13″N 14°39′7″E
- Country: Poland
- Voivodeship: West Pomeranian
- County: Goleniów
- Gmina: Stepnica
- Population: 260

Bogusławie [bɔɡuˈswavjɛ] is a village in the administrative district of Gmina Stepnica, within Goleniów County, West Pomeranian Voivodeship, in north-western Poland. It lies approximately 2 km (1 mi) east of Stepnica, 16 km (10 mi) north-west of Goleniów, and 27 km (17 mi) north of the regional capital Szczecin.

The village has a population of 260.
