= Krokorzyce =

- Village
- Location within Poland
- Coordinates: 53°40′N 14°42′E
- Country: Poland
- Voivodeship: West Pomeranian
- County: Goleniów
- Gmina: Stepnica

Krokorzyce [krɔkɔˈʐɨt͡sɛ] (German: Köckeritz) is a village in the administrative district of Gmina Stepnica, within Goleniów County, West Pomeranian Voivodeship, in north-western Poland. It lies approximately 5 km (3 mi) east of Stepnica, 16 km (10 mi) north-west of Goleniów, and 29 km (18 mi) north of the regional capital Szczecin.
