= Miłowo, West Pomeranian Voivodeship =

Miłowo
- Village
- Location within Poland
- Coordinates: 53°41′N 14°38′E
- Country: Poland
- Voivodeship: West Pomeranian
- County: Goleniów
- Gmina: Stepnica
- Population: 105

Miłowo [miˈwɔvɔ] (formerly German: Flacke) is a village in the administrative district of Gmina Stepnica, within Goleniów County, West Pomeranian Voivodeship, in north-western Poland. It lies approximately 4 km (2 mi) north of Stepnica, 20 km (12 mi) north-west of Goleniów, and 30 km (19 mi) north of the regional capital Szczecin.

The village has a population of 105.
