= Widzieńsko =

- Village
- Location within Poland
- Coordinates: 53°41′N 14°45′E
- Country: Poland
- Voivodeship: West Pomeranian
- County: Goleniów
- Gmina: Stepnica
- Population: 160

Widzieńsko [viˈd͡ʑɛɲskɔ] (formerly German: Hohenbrück) is a village in the administrative district of Gmina Stepnica, within Goleniów County, West Pomeranian Voivodeship, in north-western Poland. It lies approximately 9 km (6 mi) north-east of Stepnica, 16 km (10 mi) north of Goleniów, and 32 km (20 mi) north of the regional capital Szczecin.

The village has a population of 160.
