= Wisławie =

- Village
- Location within Poland
- Coordinates: 53°30′57″N 15°3′11″E
- Country: Poland
- Voivodeship: West Pomeranian
- County: Goleniów
- Gmina: Maszewo

Wisławie [viˈswavjɛ] (German: Schönhof) is a village in the administrative district of Gmina Maszewo, within Goleniów County, West Pomeranian Voivodeship, in north-western Poland. It lies approximately 4 km (2 mi) north of Maszewo, 17 km (11 mi) east of Goleniów, and 34 km (21 mi) east of the regional capital Szczecin.

For the history of the region, see History of Pomerania.
