= Przemocze =

- Village
- Location within Poland
- Coordinates: 53°27′39″N 14°55′49″E
- Country: Poland
- Voivodeship: West Pomeranian
- County: Goleniów
- Gmina: Maszewo

Przemocze [pʂɛˈmɔt͡ʂɛ] is a village in the administrative district of Gmina Maszewo, within Goleniów County, West Pomeranian Voivodeship, in north-western Poland. It lies approximately 10 km (6 mi) west of Maszewo, 13 km (8 mi) south-east of Goleniów, and 24 km (15 mi) east of the regional capital Szczecin.
