= Sokolniki, Goleniów County =

Sokolniki
- Village
- Location within Poland
- Coordinates: 53°28′44″N 15°8′28″E
- Country: Poland
- Voivodeship: West Pomeranian
- County: Goleniów
- Gmina: Maszewo
- Time zone: UTC+1 (CET)
  - Summer (DST): UTC+2 (CEST)

Sokolniki [sɔkɔlˈɲikʲi] (German: Falkenberg) is a village in the administrative district of Gmina Maszewo, within Goleniów County, West Pomeranian Voivodeship, in north-western Poland. It lies approximately 5 km (3 mi) east of Maszewo, 23 km (14 mi) east of Goleniów, and 38 km (24 mi) east of the regional capital Szczecin. It is located within the historic region of Pomerania.

During World War II, the Germans established and operated two forced labour camps for Jewish men and women in the village.
