= Radzanek =

- Village
- Location within Poland
- Coordinates: 53°30′11″N 15°1′1″E
- Country: Poland
- Voivodeship: West Pomeranian
- County: Goleniów
- Gmina: Maszewo

Radzanek [raˈd͡zanɛk] is a village in the administrative district of Gmina Maszewo, within Goleniów County, West Pomeranian Voivodeship, in north-western Poland. It lies approximately 4 km (2 mi) north-west of Maszewo, 15 km (9 mi) east of Goleniów, and 31 km (19 mi) east of the regional capital Szczecin.
