= Gąsierzyno =

- Village
- Location within Poland
- Coordinates: 53°40′21″N 14°34′17″E
- Country: Poland
- Voivodeship: West Pomeranian
- County: Goleniów
- Gmina: Stepnica
- Population: 190

Gąsierzyno [ɡɔ̃ɕɛˈʐɨnɔ] (formerly German: Ganserin) is a village in the administrative district of Gmina Stepnica, within Goleniów County, West Pomeranian Voivodeship, in north-western Poland. It lies approximately 5 km (3 mi) north-west of Stepnica, 22 km (14 mi) north-west of Goleniów, and 29 km (18 mi) north of the regional capital Szczecin.

The village has a population of 190.
