= Jenikowo =

- Village
- Location within Poland
- Coordinates: 53°34′39″N 15°8′11″E
- Country: Poland
- Voivodeship: West Pomeranian
- County: Goleniów
- Gmina: Maszewo

Jenikowo [jɛniˈkɔvɔ] (German: Hohen Schönau) is a village in the administrative district of Gmina Maszewo, within Goleniów County, West Pomeranian Voivodeship, in north-western Poland. It lies approximately 12 km (7 mi) north-east of Maszewo, 22 km (14 mi) east of Goleniów, and 41 km (25 mi) north-east of the regional capital Szczecin.

For the history of the region, see History of Pomerania.
