= Wałkno =

- Settlement
- Location within Poland
- Coordinates: 53°29′19″N 15°9′53″E
- Country: Poland
- Voivodeship: West Pomeranian
- County: Goleniów
- Gmina: Maszewo
- Population: 110

Wałkno [ˈvau̯knɔ] (German: Falkenau) is a settlement in the administrative district of Gmina Maszewo, within Goleniów County, West Pomeranian Voivodeship, in north-western Poland. It lies approximately 7 km (4 mi) east of Maszewo, 25 km (16 mi) east of Goleniów, and 40 km (25 mi) east of the regional capital Szczecin.

For the history of the region, see History of Pomerania.

The settlement has a population of 110.
