= Piaski Małe =

- Village
- Location within Poland
- Coordinates: 53°40′3″N 14°35′25″E
- Country: Poland
- Voivodeship: West Pomeranian
- County: Goleniów
- Gmina: Stepnica
- Population: 35

Piaski Małe (Polish pronunciation: [ˈpjaskʲi ˈmawɛ]) is a village in the administrative district of Gmina Stepnica, within Goleniów County, West Pomeranian Voivodeship, in north-western Poland. It lies approximately 4 km (2 mi) north-west of Stepnica, 20 km (12 mi) north-west of Goleniów, and 28 km (17 mi) north of the regional capital Szczecin.
