= Kikorze =

- Village
- Location within Poland
- Coordinates: 53°37′53″N 15°0′51″E
- Country: Poland
- Voivodeship: West Pomeranian
- County: Goleniów
- Gmina: Osina
- Population (approx.): 260

Kikorze [kiˈkɔʐɛ] (German: Kicker) is a village in the administrative district of Gmina Osina, within Goleniów County, West Pomeranian Voivodeship, in north-western Poland. It lies approximately 3 km (2 mi) north of Osina, 16 km (10 mi) north-east of Goleniów, and 38 km (24 mi) north-east of the regional capital Szczecin.

For the history of the region, see History of Pomerania.

The village has an approximate population of 260.
