= Godowo =

- Village
- Location within Poland
- Coordinates: 53°33′21″N 15°5′4″E
- Country: Poland
- Voivodeship: West Pomeranian
- County: Goleniów
- Gmina: Maszewo

Godowo [ɡɔˈdɔvɔ] (German: Freiheide) is a village in the administrative district of Gmina Maszewo, within Goleniów County, West Pomeranian Voivodeship, in north-western Poland. It lies approximately 9 km (6 mi) north of Maszewo, 18 km (11 mi) east of Goleniów, and 37 km (23 mi) north-east of the regional capital Szczecin.

For the history of the region, see History of Pomerania.
