= Dobrosławiec =

- Village
- Location within Poland
- Coordinates: 53°30′42″N 14°58′57″E
- Country: Poland
- Voivodeship: West Pomeranian
- County: Goleniów
- Gmina: Maszewo

Dobrosławiec [dɔbrɔˈswavjɛt͡s] (German: Friederikenhof) is a village in the administrative district of Gmina Maszewo, within Goleniów County, West Pomeranian Voivodeship, in north-western Poland. It lies approximately 7 km (4 mi) northwest of Maszewo, 12 km (7 mi) east of Goleniów, and 29 km (18 mi) east of the regional capital Szczecin.

As of 2011, the village had 109 inhabitants.
