= Maciejewo, West Pomeranian Voivodeship =

Maciejewo
- Village
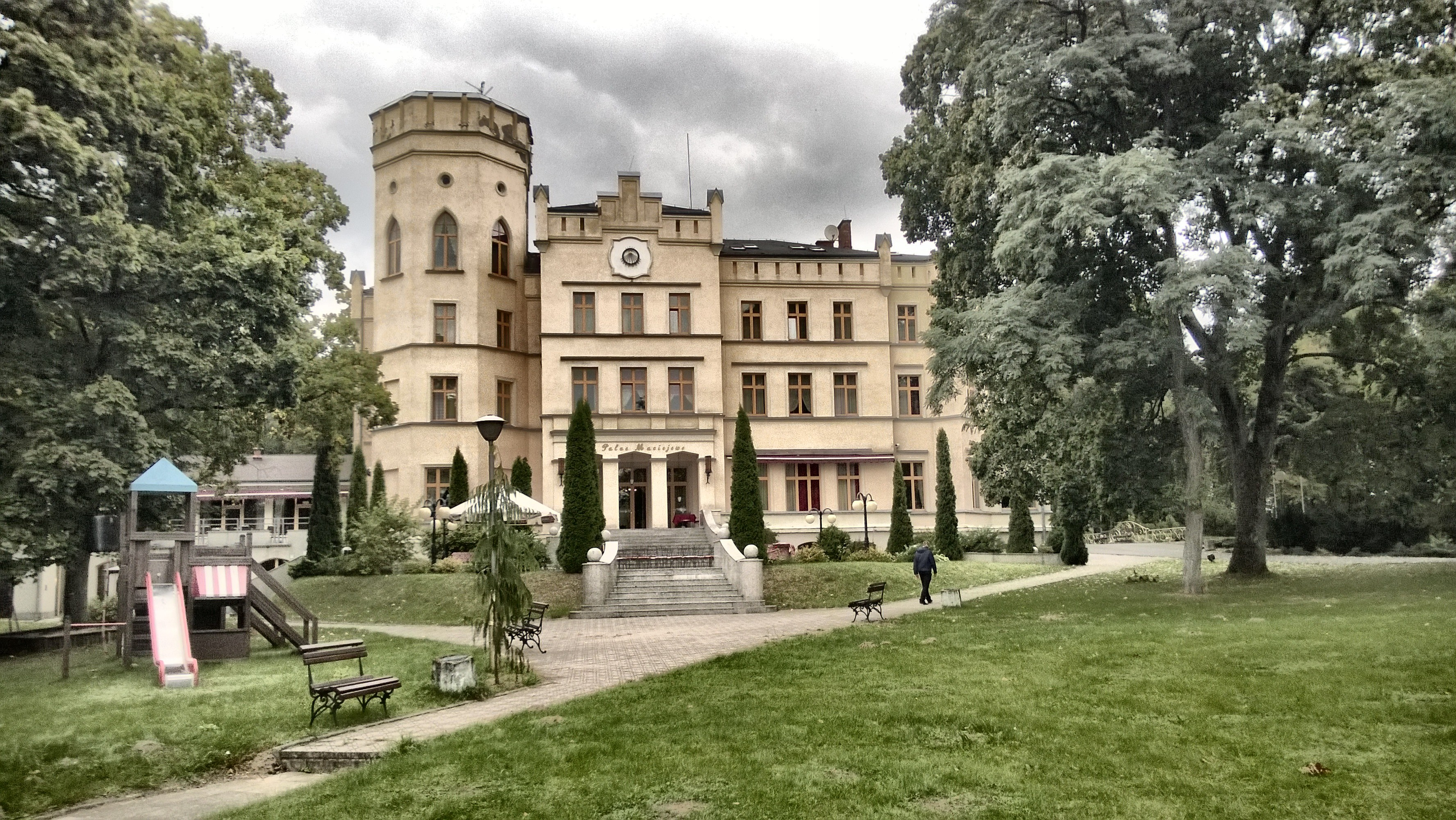
- Palace in the village

- Location within Poland
- Coordinates: 53°33′26″N 15°0′26″E
- Country: Poland
- Voivodeship: West Pomeranian
- County: Goleniów
- Gmina: Maszewo

Maciejewo [mat͡ɕɛˈjɛvɔ] (German: Matzdorf) is a village in the administrative district of Gmina Maszewo, within Goleniów County, West Pomeranian Voivodeship, in north-western Poland. It lies approximately 10 km (6 mi) north-west of Maszewo, 13 km (8 mi) east of Goleniów, and 33 km (21 mi) north-east of the regional capital Szczecin.

For the history of the region, see History of Pomerania.
