= Stodólska =

- Settlement
- Location within Poland
- Coordinates: 53°30′49″N 15°5′44″E
- Country: Poland
- Voivodeship: West Pomeranian
- County: Goleniów
- Gmina: Maszewo

Stodólska (Polish pronunciation: [stɔˈdulska]; German: Ackerhof) is a settlement in the administrative district of Gmina Maszewo, within Goleniów County, West Pomeranian Voivodeship, in north-western Poland. It lies approximately 4 km (2 mi) north-east of Maszewo, 19 km (12 mi) east of Goleniów, and 36 km (22 mi) east of the regional capital Szczecin.
