= Bęczno =

- Settlement
- Location within Poland
- Coordinates: 53°33′3″N 15°7′31″E
- Country: Poland
- Voivodeship: West Pomeranian
- County: Goleniów
- Gmina: Maszewo
- Population: 50

Bęczno [ˈbɛnt͡ʂnɔ] is a settlement in the administrative district of Gmina Maszewo, within Goleniów County, West Pomeranian Voivodeship, in north-western Poland. It lies approximately 9 km (6 mi) north-east of Maszewo, 21 km (13 mi) east of Goleniów, and 39 km (24 mi) north-east of the regional capital Szczecin.

The settlement has a population of 50.
