= Budzień =

- Village
- Location within Poland
- Coordinates: 53°37′N 14°41′E
- Country: Poland
- Voivodeship: West Pomeranian
- County: Goleniów
- Gmina: Stepnica
- Population: 110

Budzień [ˈbud͡ʑɛɲ] is a village in the administrative district of Gmina Stepnica, within Goleniów County, West Pomeranian Voivodeship, in north-western Poland. It lies approximately 6 km (4 mi) south-east of Stepnica, 12 km (7 mi) north-west of Goleniów, and 24 km (15 mi) north of the regional capital Szczecin.
