= Rogów, West Pomeranian Voivodeship =

Rogów
- Settlement
- Location within Poland
- Coordinates: 53°39′13″N 14°43′34″E
- Country: Poland
- Voivodeship: West Pomeranian
- County: Goleniów
- Gmina: Stepnica

Rogów [ˈrɔɡuf] (German: Rehbock) is a settlement in the administrative district of Gmina Stepnica, within Goleniów County, West Pomeranian Voivodeship, in north-western Poland. It lies approximately 7 km (4 mi) east of Stepnica, 13 km (8 mi) north-west of Goleniów, and 28 km (17 mi) north of the regional capital Szczecin.
