= Kościuszki, Gmina Osina =

Kościuszki
- Village
- Location within Poland
- Coordinates: 53°39′11″N 15°1′51″E
- Country: Poland
- Voivodeship: West Pomeranian
- County: Goleniów
- Gmina: Osina

Population (approx.)
  - Total: 270
- Time zone: UTC+1 (CET)
  - Summer (DST): UTC+2 (CEST)
- Vehicle registration: ZGL

Kościuszki [kɔɕˈt͡ɕuʂki] is a village in the administrative district of Gmina Osina, within Goleniów County, West Pomeranian Voivodeship, in north-western Poland. It lies approximately 6 km (4 mi) north of Osina, 19 km (12 mi) north-east of Goleniów, and 40 km (25 mi) north-east of the regional capital Szczecin.

The village has an approximate population of 270.

== History ==
The territory became part of the emerging Polish state under its first ruler Mieszko I around 967. Following the fragmentation of Poland, it was part of the Duchy of Pomerania. In the 13th century, the village was transferred by the Bishop of Cammin to the Hindenburg family, who originated from Brandenburg.

During World War II, the Germans operated a forced labour subcamp of the prison in Goleniów in the village.
