= Kałużna, West Pomeranian Voivodeship =

Kałużna
- Village
- Location within Poland
- Coordinates: 53°35′19″N 14°58′32″E
- Country: Poland
- Voivodeship: West Pomeranian
- County: Goleniów
- Gmina: Osina

Kałużna [kaˈwuʐna] (German: Kahlbruch) is a village in the administrative district of Gmina Osina, within Goleniów County, West Pomeranian Voivodeship, in north-western Poland. It lies approximately 4 km (2 mi) south-west of Osina, 12 km (7 mi) east of Goleniów, and 33 km (21 mi) north-east of the regional capital Szczecin.
