= Jarosławki, West Pomeranian Voivodeship =

Jarosławki
- Village
- Location within Poland
- Coordinates: 53°31′48″N 15°0′45″E
- Country: Poland
- Voivodeship: West Pomeranian
- County: Goleniów
- Gmina: Maszewo

Jarosławki [jarɔˈswafki] (German: Neuendorf bei Massow) is a village in the administrative district of Gmina Maszewo, within Goleniów County, West Pomeranian Voivodeship, in north-western Poland. It lies approximately 7 km (4 mi) north-west of Maszewo, 14 km (9 mi) east of Goleniów, and 32 km (20 mi) north-east of the regional capital Szczecin.

For the history of the region, see History of Pomerania.
