= Rożnowo Nowogardzkie =

- Village
- Location within Poland
- Coordinates: 53°29′3″N 14°58′34″E
- Country: Poland
- Voivodeship: West Pomeranian
- County: Goleniów
- Gmina: Maszewo

Rożnowo Nowogardzkie [rɔʐˈnɔvɔ nɔvɔˈɡart͡skʲɛ] is a village in the administrative district of Gmina Maszewo, within Goleniów County, West Pomeranian Voivodeship, in north-western Poland. It lies approximately 6 km (4 mi) west of Maszewo, 13 km (8 mi) south-east of Goleniów, and 28 km (17 mi) east of the regional capital Szczecin.
