= Mokre, Goleniów County =

Mokre
- Village
- Location within Poland
- Coordinates: 53°31′45″N 15°12′38″E
- Country: Poland
- Voivodeship: West Pomeranian
- County: Goleniów
- Gmina: Maszewo

Mokre [ˈmɔkrɛ] (German: Schönwalde) is a village in the administrative district of Gmina Maszewo, within Goleniów County, West Pomeranian Voivodeship, in north-western Poland. It lies approximately 11 km (7 mi) north-east of Maszewo, 27 km (17 mi) east of Goleniów, and 44 km (27 mi) east of the regional capital Szczecin.

For the history of the region, see History of Pomerania.
