= Czarnocin, West Pomeranian Voivodeship =

Czarnocin
- Village
- Location within Poland
- Coordinates: 53°43′N 14°33′E
- Country: Poland
- Voivodeship: West Pomeranian
- County: Goleniów
- Gmina: Stepnica

Population
  - Total: 340
- Postal code: 72-112

Czarnocin [t͡ʂarˈnɔt͡ɕin] (formerly German: Zartenthin) is a village in the administrative district of Gmina Stepnica, within Goleniów County, West Pomeranian Voivodeship, in north-western Poland. It lies approximately 9 km (6 mi) north-west of Stepnica, 26 km (16 mi) north-west of Goleniów, and 34 km (21 mi) north of the regional capital Szczecin.

The village has a population of 340.
