= Żarnowo, Goleniów County =

Żarnowo
- Village
- Location within Poland
- Coordinates: 53°44′7″N 14°39′42″E
- Country: Poland
- Voivodeship: West Pomeranian
- County: Goleniów
- Gmina: Stepnica
- Population (approx.): 400

Żarnowo [ʐarˈnɔvɔ] (formerly German: Alt Sarnow) is a village in the administrative district of Gmina Stepnica, within Goleniów County, West Pomeranian Voivodeship, in north-western Poland. It lies approximately 10 km (6 mi) north of Stepnica, 23 km (14 mi) north-west of Goleniów, and 36 km (22 mi) north of the regional capital Szczecin.

The village has an approximate population of 400.
