= Żarnówko =

- Village
- Location within Poland
- Coordinates: 53°43′N 14°39′E
- Country: Poland
- Voivodeship: West Pomeranian
- County: Goleniów
- Gmina: Stepnica
- Population: 99

Żarnówko [ʐarˈnufkɔ] (formerly German: Neu Sarnow) is a village in the administrative district of Gmina Stepnica, within Goleniów County, West Pomeranian Voivodeship, in north-western Poland. It lies approximately 8 km (5 mi) north of Stepnica, 22 km (14 mi) north-west of Goleniów, and 34 km (21 mi) north of the regional capital Szczecin.

The village has a population of 99.
