= Kopice, West Pomeranian Voivodeship =

Kopice
- Village
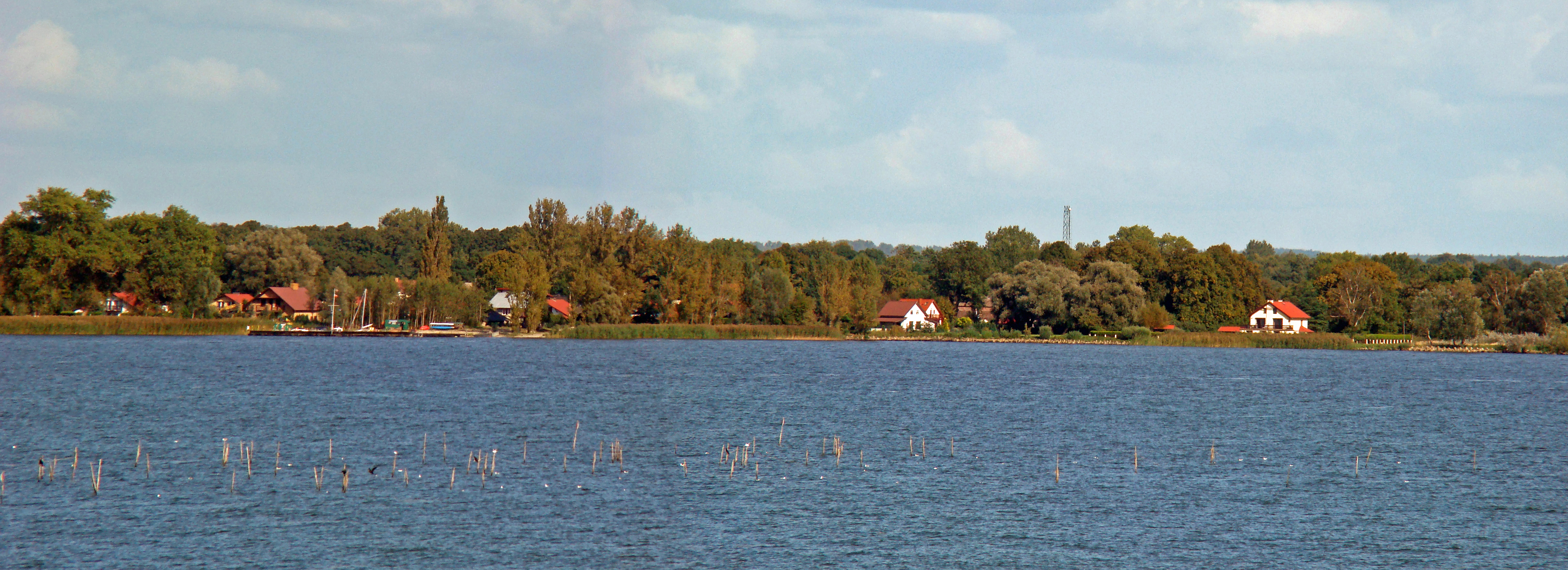

- Location within Poland
- Coordinates: 53°42′N 14°33′E
- Country: Poland
- Voivodeship: West Pomeranian
- County: Goleniów
- Gmina: Stepnica
- Population: 135

Kopice [kɔˈpit͡sɛ] (formerly German: Köplitz) is a village in the administrative district of Gmina Stepnica, within Goleniów County, West Pomeranian Voivodeship, in north-western Poland. It lies approximately 8 km (5 mi) north-west of Stepnica, 25 km (16 mi) north-west of Goleniów, and 32 km (20 mi) north of the regional capital Szczecin.

The village currently has a population of 135.
