= Węgorzyce =

- Settlement
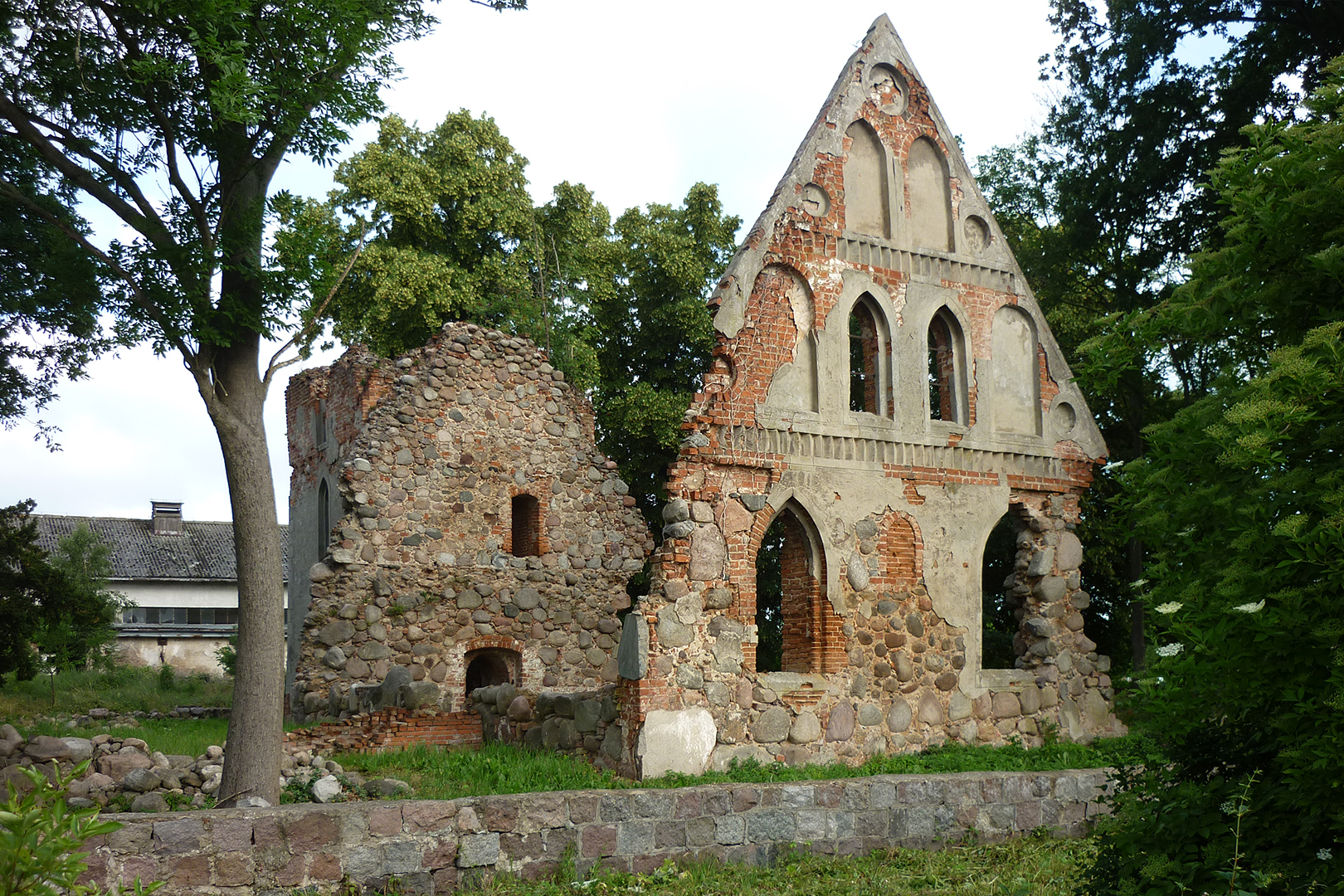

- Location within Poland
- Coordinates: 53°35′33″N 15°2′44″E
- Country: Poland
- Voivodeship: West Pomeranian
- County: Goleniów
- Gmina: Osina

Population
  - Total: 220
- Time zone: UTC+1 (CET)
  - Summer (DST): UTC+2 (CEST)
- Vehicle registration: ZGL

Węgorzyce [vɛnɡɔˈʐɨt͡sɛ] is a settlement in the administrative district of Gmina Osina, within Goleniów County, West Pomeranian Voivodeship, in north-western Poland. It lies approximately 3 km (2 mi) south-east of Osina, 16 km (10 mi) east of Goleniów, and 37 km (23 mi) north-east of the regional capital Szczecin.

The settlement has a population of 220.

== History ==
The territory became part of the emerging Polish state under its first ruler Mieszko I around 967. Following the fragmentation of Poland, it was part of the Duchy of Pomerania.

During World War II, the German Nazi government operated a forced labour subcamp of the prison in Goleniów in the village.
