= Swojcino =

- Settlement
- Location within Poland
- Coordinates: 53°27′56″N 14°59′47″E
- Country: Poland
- Voivodeship: West Pomeranian
- County: Goleniów
- Gmina: Maszewo

Swojcino [sfɔi̯ˈt͡ɕinɔ] (German: Wilhelminenberg) is a settlement in the administrative district of Gmina Maszewo, within Goleniów County, West Pomeranian Voivodeship, in north-western Poland. It lies approximately 6 km (4 mi) south-west of Maszewo, 16 km (10 mi) south-east of Goleniów, and 28 km (17 mi) east of the regional capital Szczecin.

For the history of the region, see History of Pomerania.
