= Darż =

- Village
- Location within Poland
- Coordinates: 53°28′38″N 15°2′7″E
- Country: Poland
- Voivodeship: West Pomeranian
- County: Goleniów
- Gmina: Maszewo
- Population: 376

Darż [darʂ] (German: Daarz) is a village in the administrative district of Gmina Maszewo, within Goleniów County, West Pomeranian Voivodeship, in north-western Poland. It lies approximately 3 km (2 mi) west of Maszewo, 17 km (11 mi) south-east of Goleniów, and 31 km (19 mi) east of the regional capital Szczecin.

For the history of the region, see History of Pomerania.

The village has a population of 376.
