= Mieszkowo, West Pomeranian Voivodeship =

Mieszkowo
- Village
- Location within Poland
- Coordinates: 53°28′29″N 15°4′18″E
- Country: Poland
- Voivodeship: West Pomeranian
- County: Goleniów
- Gmina: Maszewo

Mieszkowo [mjɛʂˈkɔvɔ] is a village in the administrative district of Gmina Maszewo, within Goleniów County, West Pomeranian Voivodeship, in north-western Poland. It lies approximately 2 km (1 mi) south of Maszewo, 19 km (12 mi) south-east of Goleniów, and 34 km (21 mi) east of the regional capital Szczecin.

For the history of the region, see History of Pomerania.
