= Bagna, West Pomeranian Voivodeship =

Bagna
- Village
- Location within Poland
- Coordinates: 53°32′40″N 15°10′26″E
- Country: Poland
- Voivodeship: West Pomeranian
- County: Goleniów
- Gmina: Maszewo

Bagna [ˈbaɡna] (German: Pagenkopf) is a village in the administrative district of Gmina Maszewo, within Goleniów County, West Pomeranian Voivodeship, in northwestern Poland. It lies approximately 10 km (6 mi) northeast of Maszewo, 24 km (15 mi) east of Goleniów, and 42 km (26 mi) east of the regional capital Szczecin.

For the history of the region, see History of Pomerania.
