= Węgorza =

- Village
- Location within Poland
- Coordinates: 53°39′35″N 14°58′37″E
- Country: Poland
- Voivodeship: West Pomeranian
- County: Goleniów
- Gmina: Osina
- Population: 420

Węgorza [vɛnˈɡɔʐa] (German: Alt Fanger) is a village in the administrative district of Gmina Osina, within Goleniów County, West Pomeranian Voivodeship, in north-western Poland. It lies approximately 7 km (4 mi) north of Osina, 17 km (11 mi) north-east of Goleniów, and 38 km (24 mi) north-east of the regional capital Szczecin.

The village has a population of 420.
