= Dąbrowica, Goleniów County =

Dąbrowica
- Village
- Location within Poland
- Coordinates: 53°27′53″N 14°58′20″E
- Country: Poland
- Voivodeship: West Pomeranian
- County: Goleniów
- Gmina: Maszewo

Dąbrowica [dɔmbrɔˈvit͡sa] (German: Damerfitz) is a village in the administrative district of Gmina Maszewo, within Goleniów County, West Pomeranian Voivodeship, in north-western Poland. It lies approximately 7 km (4 mi) west of Maszewo, 14 km (9 mi) south-east of Goleniów, and 27 km (17 mi) east of the regional capital Szczecin.

For the history of the region, see History of Pomerania.
