= Dębice, West Pomeranian Voivodeship =

Dębice
- Village
- Location within Poland
- Coordinates: 53°32′6″N 15°7′9″E
- Country: Poland
- Voivodeship: West Pomeranian
- County: Goleniów
- Gmina: Maszewo
- Population: 900

Dębice [dɛmˈbit͡sɛ] (German: Eichenwalde) is a village in the administrative district of Gmina Maszewo, within Goleniów County, West Pomeranian Voivodeship, in north-western Poland. It lies approximately 7 km (4 mi) north-east of Maszewo, 21 km (13 mi) east of Goleniów, and 38 km (24 mi) east of the regional capital Szczecin.

For the history of the region, see History of Pomerania.

The village has a population of 900.
