= Krzywice, West Pomeranian Voivodeship =

Krzywice
- Village
- Location within Poland
- Coordinates: 53°36′0″N 14°57′48″E
- Country: Poland
- Voivodeship: West Pomeranian
- County: Goleniów
- Gmina: Osina
- Time zone: UTC+1 (CET)
  - Summer (DST): UTC+2 (CEST)
- Vehicle registration: ZGL

Krzywice [kʂɨˈvit͡sɛ] (German: Kriewitz) is a village in the administrative district of Gmina Osina, within Goleniów County, West Pomeranian Voivodeship, in north-western Poland. It lies approximately 4 km (2 mi) west of Osina, 12 km (7 mi) north-east of Goleniów, and 33 km (21 mi) north-east of the regional capital Szczecin.
