= Stepnica (river) =

River in Poland

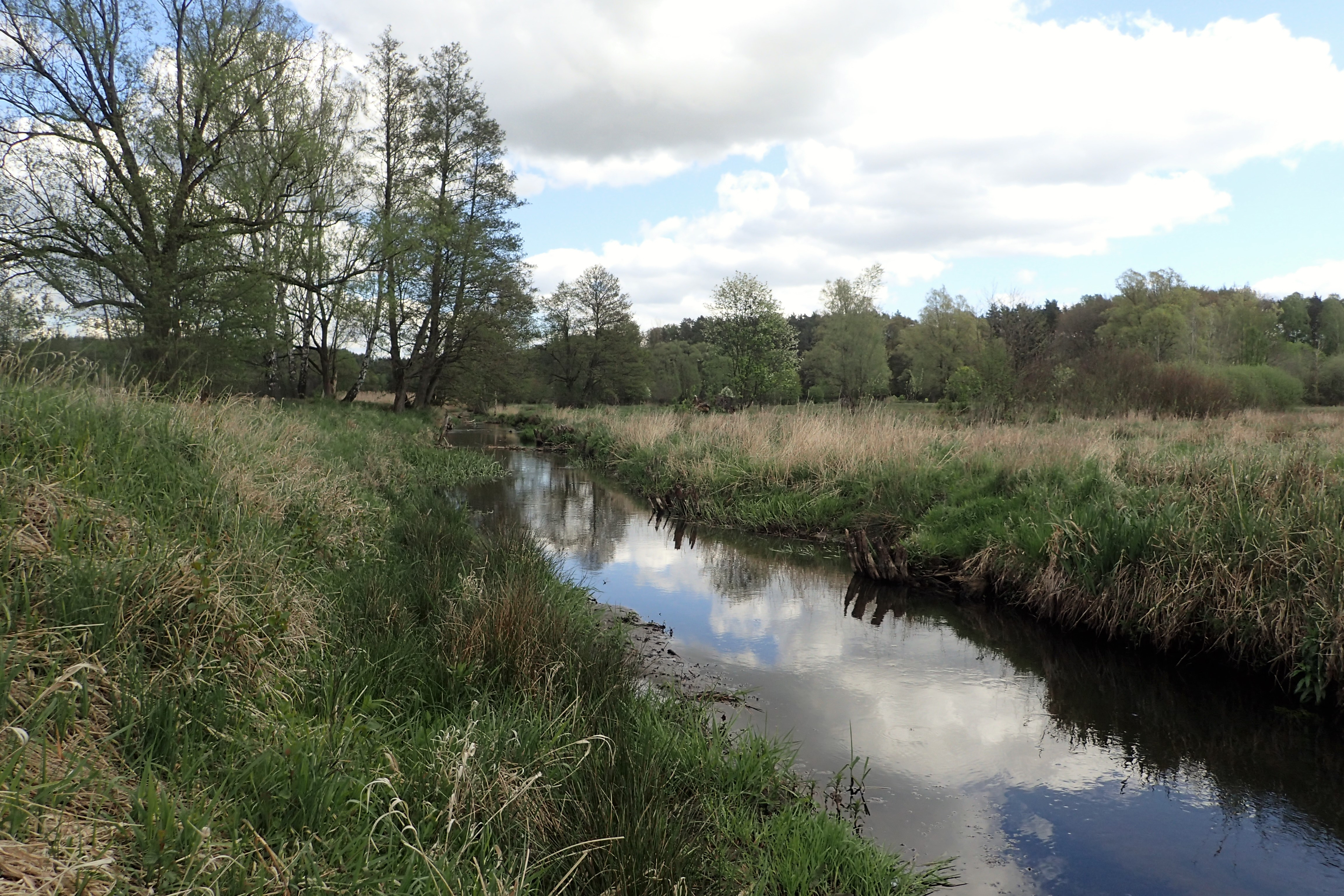

Location
- Country: Poland

Physical characteristics
- Mouth
  - location: Gowienica
  - coordinates: 53°38′22″N 14°55′09″E

Basin features
- Progression: Gowienica→ Oder→ Baltic Sea

Stepnica is a river of Poland, a tributary of the Gowienica near Bodzęcin.
