= Bodzęcin =

- Village
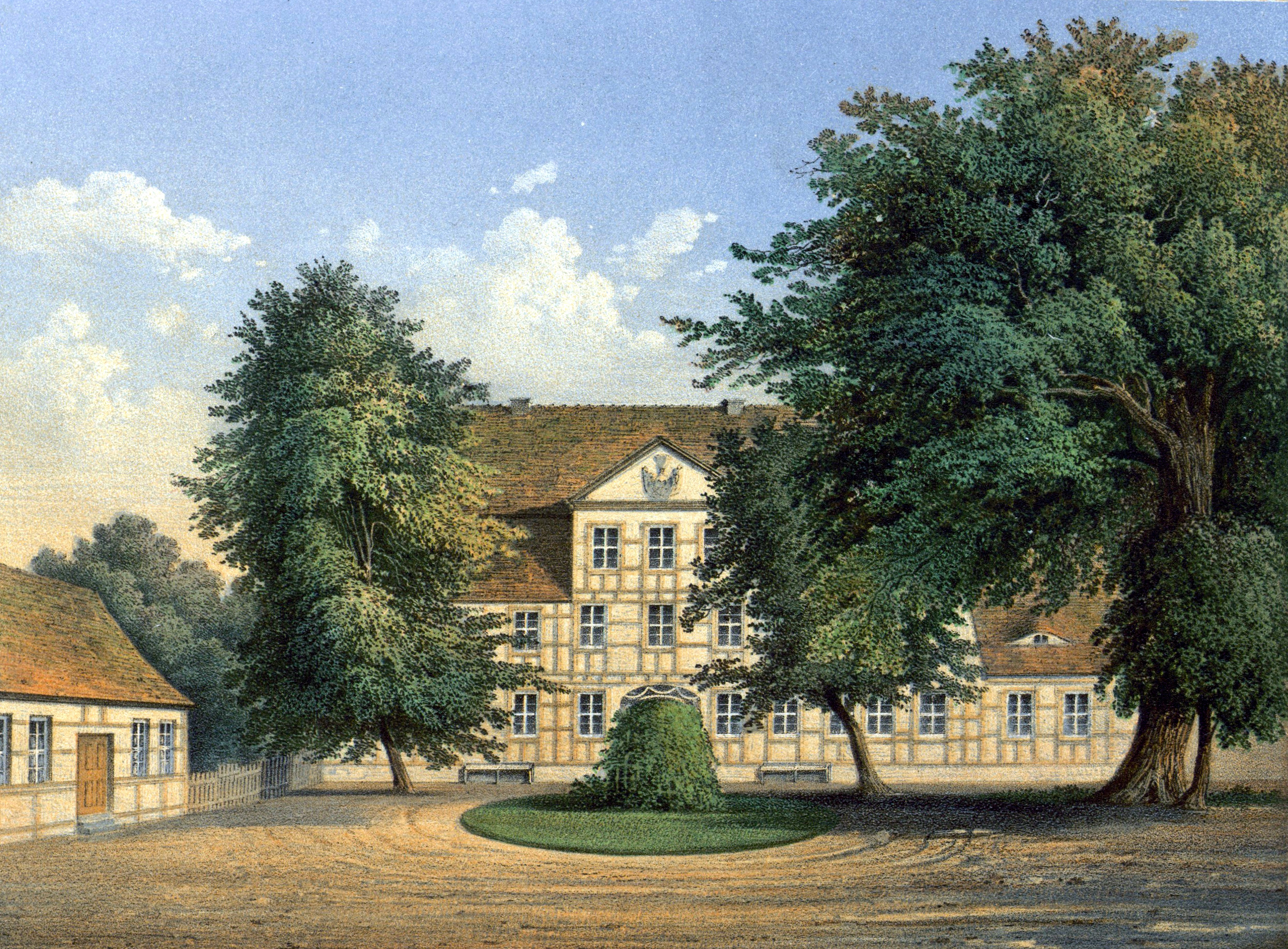
- 19th-century view of the former palace

- Location within Poland
- Coordinates: 53°38′14″N 14°55′43″E
- Country: Poland
- Voivodeship: West Pomeranian
- County: Goleniów
- Gmina: Osina
- Population: 220
- Time zone: UTC+1 (CET)
  - Summer (DST): UTC+2 (CEST)
- Vehicle registration: ZGL
- Primary airport: Solidarity Szczecin–Goleniów Airport

Bodzęcin [bɔˈd͡zɛnt͡ɕin] (German: Basenthin) is a village in the administrative district of Gmina Osina, within Goleniów County, West Pomeranian Voivodeship, in north-western Poland. It lies approximately 7 km (4 mi) north-west of Osina, 13 km (8 mi) north-east of Goleniów, and 34 km (21 mi) north-east of the regional capital Szczecin.

The village has a population of 220.

== History ==
In the 10th century the region became part of the emerging Duchy of Poland. Following the fragmentation of Poland into smaller duchies, it formed part of the Duchy of Pomerania. From the 18th century it was part of Prussia, and from 1871 to 1945 it was also part of Germany. During World War II, a forced labour subcamp of the Nazi prison for youth in Nowogard was operated by the Germans in the village. After Germany's defeat in the war, in 1945, the area became again part of Poland.
