= Helenów (Goleniów) =

Coordinates: 53°32′39″N 14°51′53″E

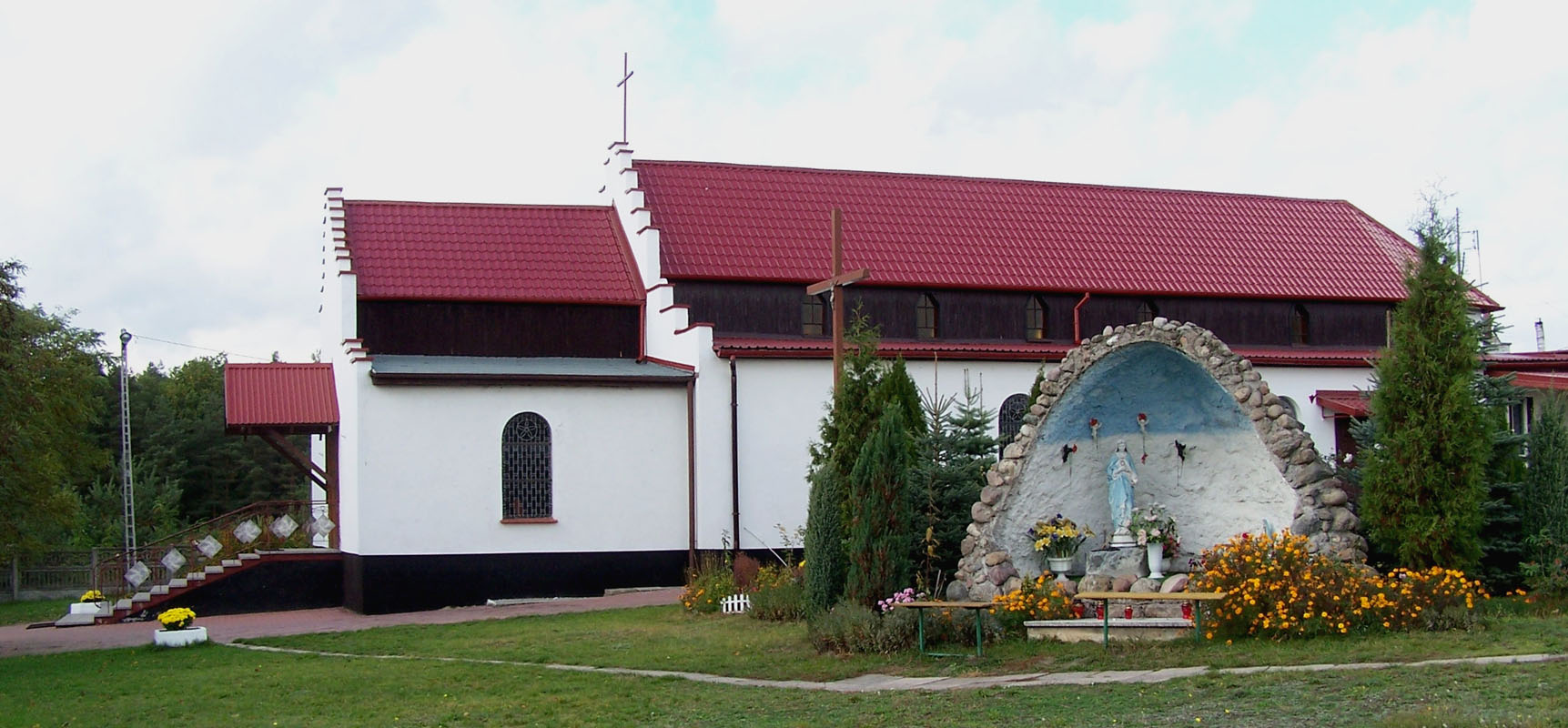
The Roman Catholic parish church of Mary of Perpetual Help in Helenów

Helenów, known as Helgenfeld until 1945, is a neighborhood in Goleniów, in Goleniów County, Poland. It is situated two kilometres south of the centre of town, near the road leading to Stargard, by the river Wiśniówka, on the edge of Równina Goleniowska (Goleniów Plain) and Równina Nowogardzka (Nowogard Plain), and bordered on the west by the forests of Puszcza Goleniowska (Goleniów Forest).

The village of Helenów was linked with the town in 1954. There is a church NMP, built after World War II, with Maria's Chapel and a belltower nearby. Near the old railway cross is the Madonna of Helenów chapel. The town includes transportation companies, a primary school, football pitch, medical clinic and post office. The oldest buildings are from the beginning of the 20th century. It was once linked with Goleniów and Maszewo by a railway line, which was removed in 2005.

Nearby towns and villages: Goleniów, Zabrodzie, Podańsko, Żółwia
