= Gmina Osina =

Gmina Osina Osina Commune
- Gmina
- Coat of arms
- Interactive map of Gmina Osina
- Coordinates (Osina): 53°36′20″N 15°0′49″E
- Country: Poland
- Voivodeship: West Pomeranian
- County: Goleniów
- Seat: Osina

Area
  - Total: 101.92 km^{2} (39.35 sq mi)

Population (2006)
  - Total: 2,892
  - Density: 28.38/km^{2} (73.49/sq mi)
- Website: http://www.osina.pl/

Gmina Osina is a rural gmina (administrative district) in Goleniów County, West Pomeranian Voivodeship, in north-western Poland. Its seat is the village of Osina, which lies approximately 15 kilometres (9 mi) north-east of Goleniów and 36 km (22 mi) north-east of the regional capital Szczecin.

The gmina covers an area of 101.92 square kilometres (39.4 sq mi), and as of 2006 its total population is 2,892.

== Villages ==
Gmina Osina contains the villages and settlements of Bodzęcin, Gorzęcino, Kałużna, Kikorze, Kościuszki, Krzywice, Osina, Przypólsko, Redło, Redostowo, Węgorza and Węgorzyce.

== Neighbouring gminas ==
Gmina Osina is bordered by the gminas of Goleniów, Maszewo, Nowogard and Przybiernów.
