= Pogrzymie =

- Village
- Location within Poland
- Coordinates: 53°32′21″N 14°58′57″E
- Country: Poland
- Voivodeship: West Pomeranian
- County: Goleniów
- Gmina: Maszewo

Pogrzymie [pɔˈɡʐɨmjɛ] (German: Birkenwerder) is a village in the administrative district of Gmina Maszewo, within Goleniów County, West Pomeranian Voivodeship, in north-western Poland. It lies approximately 9 km (6 mi) north-west of Maszewo, 12 km (7 mi) east of Goleniów, and 30 km (19 mi) north-east of the regional capital Szczecin.

For the history of the region, see History of Pomerania.
