= Racimierz, Goleniów County =

Racimierz
- Village
- Location within Poland
- Coordinates: 53°45′N 14°39′E
- Country: Poland
- Voivodeship: West Pomeranian
- County: Goleniów
- Gmina: Stepnica
- Population (approx.): 230

Racimierz [raˈt͡ɕimjɛʂ] (formerly German: Hermannsthal) is a village in the administrative district of Gmina Stepnica, within Goleniów County, West Pomeranian Voivodeship, in north-western Poland. It lies approximately 11 km (7 mi) north of Stepnica, 25 km (16 mi) north-west of Goleniów, and 38 km (24 mi) north of the regional capital Szczecin.

The village has an approximate population of 230.
