= Stepniczka =

- Village
- Location within Poland
- Coordinates: 53°39′50″N 14°35′42″E
- Country: Poland
- Voivodeship: West Pomeranian
- County: Goleniów
- Gmina: Stepnica
- Population: 225

Stepniczka [stɛpˈnit͡ʂka] (formerly German: Sandhof) is a village in the administrative district of Gmina Stepnica, within Goleniów County, West Pomeranian Voivodeship, in north-western Poland.

The village has a population of 225.
