= Gmina Stepnica =

Gmina Stepnica Stepnica Commune
- Gmina
- Coat of arms
- Interactive map of Gmina Stepnica
- Coordinates (Stepnica): 53°39′13″N 14°37′57″E
- Country: Poland
- Voivodeship: West Pomeranian
- County: Goleniów
- Seat: Stepnica

Area
  - Total: 294.16 km^{2} (113.58 sq mi)

Population (2006)
  - Total: 4,693
  - Density: 15.95/km^{2} (41.32/sq mi)
- Website: http://www.stepnica.pl/

Gmina Stepnica is an urban-rural gmina (administrative district) in Goleniów County, West Pomeranian Voivodeship, in north-western Poland. Its seat is the town of Stepnica, which lies approximately 17 kilometres (11 mi) north-west of Goleniów and 27 km (17 mi) north of the regional capital Szczecin.

The gmina covers an area of 294.16 square kilometres (113.6 sq mi), and as of 2006 its total population is 4,693.

== Villages ==
Gmina Stepnica contains the villages and settlements of Bogusławie, Borowice, Budzień, Czarnocin, Gąsierzyno, Jarszewko, Kopice, Krokorzyce, Łąka, Miłowo, Piaski Małe, Racimierz, Rogów, Stepnica, Stepniczka, Widzieńsko, Żarnówko, Żarnowo and Zielonczyn.

== Neighbouring gminas ==
Gmina Stepnica is bordered by the city of Świnoujście and by the gminas of Goleniów, Międzyzdroje, Nowe Warpno, Police, Przybiernów and Wolin.
