= Zielonczyn, West Pomeranian Voivodeship =

Zielonczyn
- Village
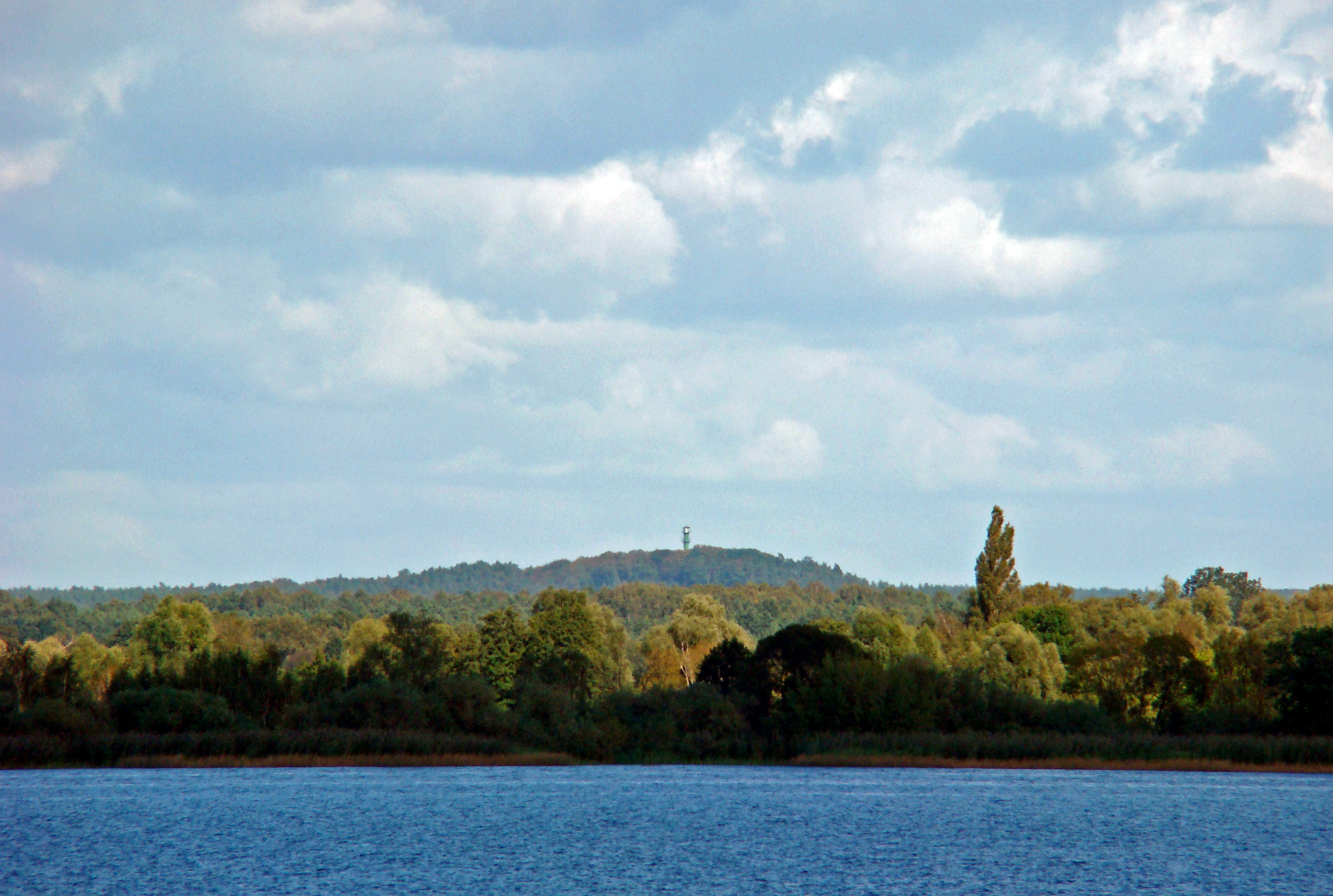

- Location within Poland
- Coordinates: 53°41′54″N 14°40′11″E
- Country: Poland
- Voivodeship: West Pomeranian
- County: Goleniów
- Gmina: Stepnica

Population
  - Total: around 80

Zielonczyn [ʑɛˈlɔnt͡ʂɨn] (formerly German: Graseberg) is a village in the administrative district of Gmina Stepnica, within Goleniów County, West Pomeranian Voivodeship, in north-western Poland.

The village has a population of 80.
