= Gmina Maszewo, West Pomeranian Voivodeship =

Gmina Maszewo Maszewo Commune
- Gmina
- Flag Coat of arms
- Interactive map of Gmina Maszewo
- Coordinates (Maszewo): 53°29′N 15°4′E
- Country: Poland
- Voivodeship: West Pomeranian
- County: Goleniów
- Seat: Maszewo

Area
  - Total: 210.51 km^{2} (81.28 sq mi)

Population (2006)
  - Total: 8,312
  - Density: 39.49/km^{2} (102.3/sq mi)
  - Urban: 3,073
  - Rural: 5,239
- Website: http://www.maszewo.pl/

Gmina Maszewo is an urban-rural gmina (administrative district) in Goleniów County, West Pomeranian Voivodeship, in north-western Poland. Its seat is the town of Maszewo, which lies approximately 19 kilometres (12 mi) south-east of Goleniów and 33 km (21 mi) east of the regional capital Szczecin.

The gmina covers an area of 210.51 square kilometres (81.3 sq mi), and as of 2006 its total population is 8,312 (out of which the population of Maszewo amounts to 3,073, and the population of the rural part of the gmina is 5,239).

== Villages ==
Apart from the town of Maszewo, Gmina Maszewo contains the villages and settlements of Bagna, Bęczno, Bielice, Budzieszowce, Dąbrowica, Darż, Dębice, Dobrosławiec, Dolacino, Godowo, Jarosławki, Jenikowo, Kłodniki, Kolonia Maszewo, Korytowo, Leszczynka, Maciejewo, Maszewko, Mieszkowo, Mokre, Nastazin, Pogrzymie, Przemocze, Radzanek, Rożnowo Nowogardzkie, Sokolniki, Stodólska, Swojcino, Tarnowo, Wałkno, Wisławie and Zagórce.

== Neighbouring gminas ==
Gmina Maszewo is bordered by the gminas of Chociwel, Dobra, Goleniów, Nowogard, Osina, Stara Dąbrowa and Stargard.
