= Borowice, West Pomeranian Voivodeship =

Borowice
- Settlement
- Location within Poland
- Coordinates: 53°39′43″N 14°45′19″E
- Country: Poland
- Voivodeship: West Pomeranian
- County: Goleniów
- Gmina: Stepnica

Borowice [bɔrɔˈvit͡sɛ] is a settlement in the administrative district of Gmina Stepnica, within Goleniów County, West Pomeranian Voivodeship, in north-western Poland.
