= Gorzęcino =

- Village
- Location within Poland
- Coordinates: 53°38′44″N 15°00′12″E
- Country: Poland
- Voivodeship: West Pomeranian
- County: Goleniów
- Gmina: Osina

Gorzęcino [ɡɔʐɛnˈt͡ɕinɔ] (German: Rehhagen) is a village in the administrative district of Gmina Osina, within Goleniów County, West Pomeranian Voivodeship, in north-western Poland.

For the history of the region, see History of Pomerania.
