= Dolacino =

- Settlement
- Location within Poland
- Coordinates: 53°29′21″N 15°00′14″E
- Country: Poland
- Voivodeship: West Pomeranian
- County: Goleniów
- Gmina: Maszewo

Dolacino [dɔlaˈt͡ɕinɔ] (German: Emilienhof) is a settlement in the administrative district of Gmina Maszewo, within Goleniów County, West Pomeranian Voivodeship, in north-western Poland.

For the history of the region, see History of Pomerania.
