= Werner Kollath =

German bacteriologist, hygienist and food scientist

- Born: 11 June 1892; Gollnow, Farther Pomerania
- Died: 19 November 1970 (aged 78); Porza, Switzerland
- Known for: whole foods, probiotics

Werner Georg Kollath (11 June 1892 – 19 November 1970) was a German bacteriologist, hygienist and food scientist. He is considered a pioneer of whole foods.

== Biography ==
Werner Kollath was born on 11 June 1892 in Gollnow, the son of the practical physician Dr. George Kollath. After attending school in Gollnow and Stettin, completing his abitur in autumn 1911, he studied medicine in Leipzig, Freiburg, Berlin and Kiel. During World War I, for which he registered as a volunteer, he served as a field physician.

After the war he continued his studies in Marburg. He gained his doctorate there in 1920, and received his licence to work as a medical doctor. In 1923, he became assistant to Richard Pfeiffer at the Hygiene Institute of the University of Breslau. In 1926, he completed his habilitation with a thesis on "Vitamin Substance or Vitamin Effect in Influenza Bacteria" (German: Vitaminsubstanz oder Vitaminwirkung bei Influenzabakterien). In 1932, he was appointed special professor of the University of Breslau, and in 1933-1934, was appointed department head for the subject Hygiene.

=== Nazi party ===
In 1933, he joined the Nazi Party. He was also a SS-Fördermitglied and from October 1933 was a member of the National Socialist Teachers League (German: Nationalsozialistischer Lehrerbund (NSLB)), the National Socialist German University Lecturers League (German: Nationalsozialistischer Deutscher Dozentenbund), the National Socialist People's Welfare (German: Nationalsozialistische Volkswohlfahrt (NSV)), and the State Air Protection Corps (German: Reichsluftschutzbund). This information appears on Kollath's Nazi Party membership card.

In 1935 he was appointed as Professor of Hygiene and Bacteriology at the University of Rostock and was also Director of the Provincial Health Office (German: Landesgesundheitsamt). He held lectures, among other subjects, on racial hygiene, and advocated the establishment of a department for this subject.

In 1937, he was for one year Dean of the Faculty of Medicine, and published a textbook on hygiene entitled Grundlagen, Methoden und Ziele der Hygiene (Principles, Methods and Goals of Health). Kollath's hygiene textbook was approved by the authorities in Nazi Germany, probably because of the passages on eugenics. The state organisation for the promotion of German literature (German: Reichsstelle zur Förderung des deutschen Schrifttums) chose the book as one of the 100 best German books of the year 1936/37. The book includes the statement "The difficulties in the hygienic area has so far been that adequate legislation, for instance the elimination of inferior (people) from reproduction, has failed in the past." (German: Die Schwierigkeiten auf hygienischem Gebiet lagen bisher darin, dass eine ausreichende Gesetzgebung, die z. B. die Ausschaltung Minderwertiger von der Fortpflanzung ermöglichte, in der Vergangenheit nicht bestanden hat.) His support for the Nazi laws is also confirmed by his statement "Eine höhere und edlere Form der Humanität ist erst durch die nationalsozialistische Gesetzgebung in Deutschland eingeführt durch die Sterilisationsgesetze“ (Translation: "A higher and nobler form of humanity is introduced by the Nazi legislation in Germany by the sterilization laws")

In 1942, Kollath published his most important book, Die Ordnung unserer Nahrung. The publication date indicates the importance of the book to the Nazi regime for the war. In the book, Kollath used the word Vollwertkost, which can be literally translated as full value food, but for which the phrase whole foods is used. Vollwertkost meant a diet that contains everything an organism needs for its preservation and the conservation of the species. For the food concept itself, he resorted mainly to Maximilian Bircher-Benner's publications. Kollath classified all foods into six value levels. The lower the degree (of processing), the higher was the food's value. Plants were always rated higher than animals, and raw food higher than cooked food. Kollath also distinguished between unprocessed or slightly processed food, which he regarded as living food, and highly processed food, which he regarded as dead food (German: tote Nahrung).

Kollath's commitment to Nazism continued until the spring of 1945. Before the capitulation, he took part in exercises of the Volkssturm.

=== After World War II ===
Because of the order of the president of Mecklenburg-Vorpommern for cleansing the administration on 30 August 1945, Kollath was dismissed because of his party affiliation. Kollath appealed against his dismissal with the assertion that he was not an active fascist, but had represented contrary opinions. He kept a leading position in the commission until 1946. Rostock was part of the Soviet occupation zone. Kollath was certified by the SED that he was "only a nominal member of the Nazi Party", and that he had applied for admission to the KPD in December 1945. He was also included as a party candidate in the SED, which is mistakenly referred to as denazification. In 1947, he was dismissed as director of the provincial health office. In March 1947, Kollath secretly left the Soviet occupation zone in a pre-arranged flight, and moved to Hanover, where he worked as a food chemist and consultant for the Keksfabrikanten Bahlsen, for whom he had tested flyer drop food during World War II.

In 1948, he published the second edition of his hygiene textbook. In this edition, he changed 'racial hygiene' to 'social hygiene', 'Goebbels' to 'Goethe', and deleted passages dealing with Hitler, selection, inheritance and forced sterilisation. In 1948, he received his denazification certificate in category IV, which was changed to category V after his successful appeal, and researched from September 1948 to February 1949 at the Pathological Institute in Stockholm.

In 1950, he published the book Der Vollwert der Nahrung und seine Bedeutung für Wachstum und Zellersatz (The full value of nutrition and its importance for growth and cell replacement), in which he wrote about a 'full value theory' (German: Vollwertlehre). He continued after 1950 to work on the popularising of whole foods, and worked on the first Gesundheitsbrockhaus, a health encyclopaedia.

Since 1951, the so-called "Kollath-breakfast" (cereal mixture) has been sold in Reformhaus shops.

During a private trip through Chile, he was offered a research position at the Medical Faculty of Hygiene in Santiago de Chile which he turned down. In April 1952, he was retired retroactively from April 1951, allegedly on the basis of an official medical report, and so had an income again. From 1952 to 1956, he carried out studies on animals at the Ludwig-Maximilians-Universität München to prove his hypotheses on mesotrophy by inadequate diet. Kollath is credited with the introduction of the term 'probiotics'. In 1953, he wrote about probiotics as being in contrast to harmful antibiotics, and defined 'Probiotika' as being "active substances that are essential for a healthy development of life".

Kollath's work on nutrition was recognised in the 1950s and 1960s by the Internationale Gesellschaft für Nahrungs- und Vitalstoff-Forschung (IVG), the World Union for Protection of Life, and the Arbeitskreis Gesundheitskunde, which was established in 1964, and also people practising alternative medicine. The 17th edition of his book "Die Ordnung unserer Nahrung" was published in 2005, and is regarded as a basis for whole food nutrition.

Kollath invented a method for preserving grains and some legumes without chemicals or overheating. The method is named after him, the Kollath method (German: collatieren).

Kollath wrote 326 scientific publications including 28 books. The Werner and Elisabeth Kollath Foundation, based in Bad Soden, is dedicated to the promotion of holistic scientific nutritional and health research.

== Publications ==
- Vitaminsubstanz oder Vitaminwirkung? Eine Studie über Zusammenhänge zwischen Mineral- und Sauerstoff-Stoffwechsel, Phosphatiden und ultraviolettem Licht, geprüft an den Wachstumsbedingungen des Influenzabazillus (Bazillus Pfeiffer), in: Zentralblatt für Bakteriologie, Parasitenkunde und Infektionskrankheiten 100, 1926, 97-145.
- Grundlagen, Methoden und Ziele der Hygiene. Eine Einführung für Mediziner und Naturwissenschaftler, Volkswirtschaftler und Techniker, Leipzig 1937.
- Zur Einheit der Heilkunde, Stuttgart 1942 (Autobiography).
- Die Ordnung unserer Nahrung. Grundlagen einer dauerhaften Ernährungslehre, Stuttgart 1942.
- Lehrbuch der Hygiene, 2 volumes, Stuttgart 1949.
- Der Vollwert der Nahrung und seine Bedeutung für Wachstum und Zellersatz. Experimentelle Grundlagen, Stuttgart 1950.
- Getreide und Mensch – eine Lebensgemeinschaft, Bad Homburg v. d. H. 1964
