= Jarszewko =

- Village
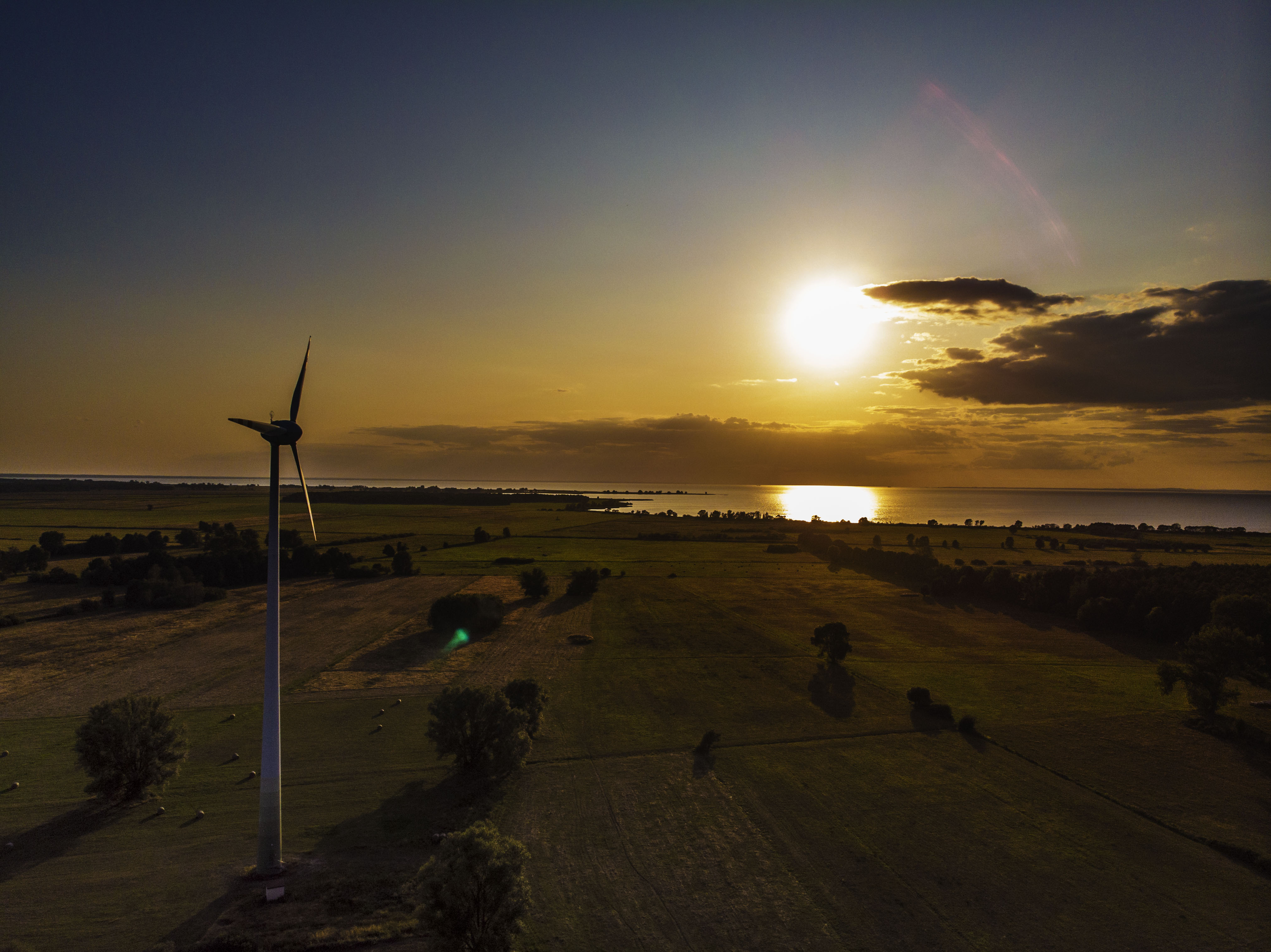

- Location within Poland
- Coordinates: 53°45′N 14°39′E
- Country: Poland
- Voivodeship: West Pomeranian
- County: Goleniów
- Gmina: Stepnica

Population
  - Total: 80
- Time zone: UTC+1 (CET)
  - Summer (DST): UTC+2 (CEST)
- Vehicle registration: ZGL

Jarszewko [jarˈʂɛfkɔ] (German: Jassow am Haff) is a village in the administrative district of Gmina Stepnica, within Goleniów County, West Pomeranian Voivodeship, in north-western Poland. It lies approximately 70 km (43 mi) from Szczecin and 30 km (19 mi) from Świnoujście. The village lies on the coast of the Szczecin Lagoon.

It was first mentioned in 1590, and belonged to the family of von Flemming.
