= Karol Polejowski =

Polish historian (born 1969)

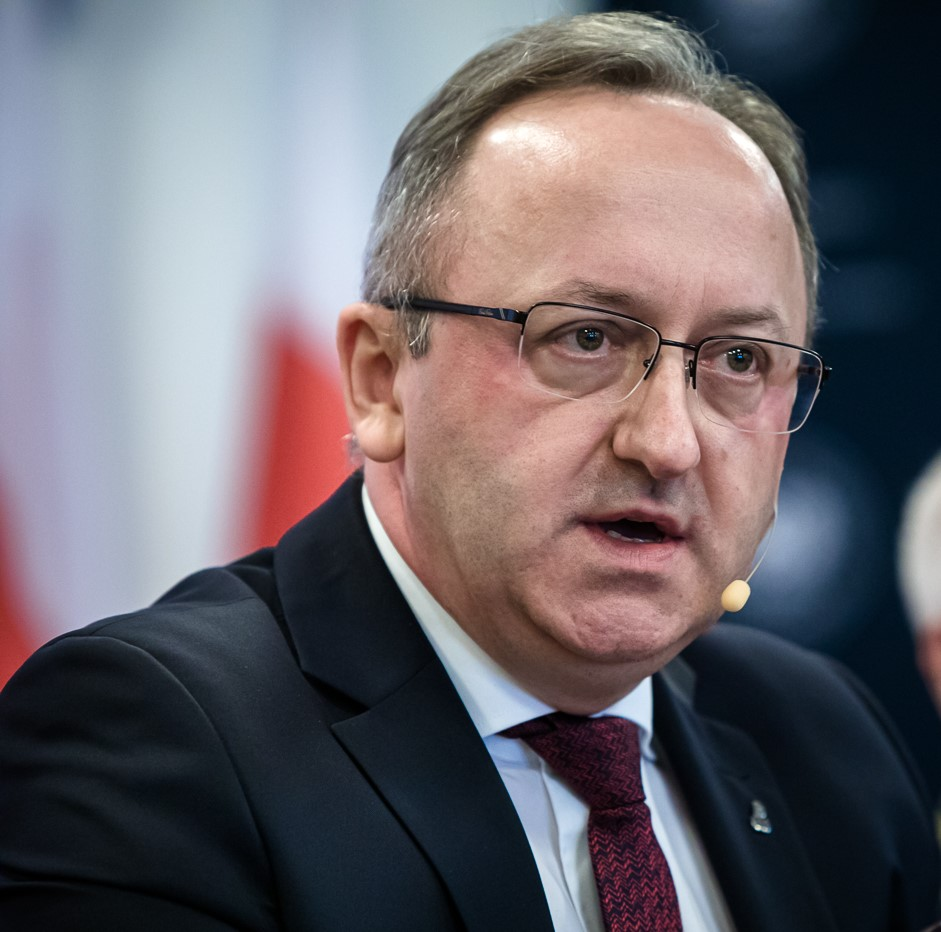
- Karol Polejowski, 2024
- Born: 10 May 1969 (age 57)
- Citizenship: Polish
- Occupation: historian

Karol Piotr Polejowski (born 10 May 1969) is a historian-medievalist, translator, from 2021 vice-president of the Institute of National Remembrance.

== Biography ==
He graduated from the University of Gdańsk and obtained his doctoral degree in 2000 under the supervision of Wiesław Długokęcki. He obtained habilitation in 2016. On 21 November 2025, Sejm voted to reject his candidacy for the president of the Institute of National Remembrance.

== Works ==
- Geneza i rozwój posiadłości zakonu krzyżackiego na terenie Królestwa Francji do połowy XIV wieku. Gdańsk: Wydawnictwo Uniwersytetu Gdańskiego. 2003.
- Matrimonium et crux: wzrost i kariera rodu Brienne w czasie wypraw krzyżowych (do początku XIV wieku). Gdańsk: Wydawnictwo Ateneum – Szkoły Wyższej. 2014.
- O Polskę wolną i czystą jak łza: Szwadron 5. Brygady Wileńskiej AK ppor. Zdzisława Badochy „Żelaznego” na terenie powiatu kartuskiego w maju 1946 roku. Gdańsk: Muzeum II Wojny Światowej. 2021.

=== Editions ===
- W służbie zabytków. Księga pamiątkowa dedykowana Mariuszowi Mierzwińskiemu. Malbork: Muzeum Zamkowe. 2017. Co-editor: Janusz Hochleitner.
- Odkrywamy polskość Malborka w stulecie odzyskania niepodległości. Malbork: Malborskie Centrum Kultury i Edukacji. 2018. Co-editor: Janusz Hochleitner.
- Fryszowski, Rudolf (2021). Pejzaż wojennych wspomnień: zapiski majora Wojska Polskiego z czasów niewoli 1939–1945. Gdańsk: Muzeum II Wojny Światowej. Co-editor: Michał Mikołajczak.

=== Translations ===
- Schlumberger, Gustave (2016). Ekspedycje króla Jerozolimy Amalryka I do Egiptu w latach 1163–1169. Oświęcim: Wydawnictwo Napoleon V.
- Chartrou, Josèphe (2016). Andegawenia w latach 1109–1151: Fulko, król Jerozolimy i Gotfryd Plantagenêt. Oświęcim: Wydawnictwo Napoleon V.
- Grousset, René (2019). Historia wypraw krzyżowych i frankijskiego Królestwa Jerozolimy, vol. 1, Muzułmańska anarchia i monarchia frankijska. Oświęcim: Wydawnictwo Napoleon V.
- Grousset, René (2021). Historia wypraw krzyżowych i frankijskiego Królestwa Jerozolimy, vol. 2, Monarchia frankijska i monarchia muzułmańska: równowaga. Oświęcim: Wydawnictwo Napoleon V.

== Awards ==
- Knight's Cross of Polonia Restituta (2025)
- Silver Medal „Zasłużony dla Nauki Polskiej Sapientia et Veritas”
- „Krzyż Pamięci Niezłomnych Żołnierzy Wyklętych 1944–1963” (2024)
