= Osina, Goleniów County =

Osina
- Village
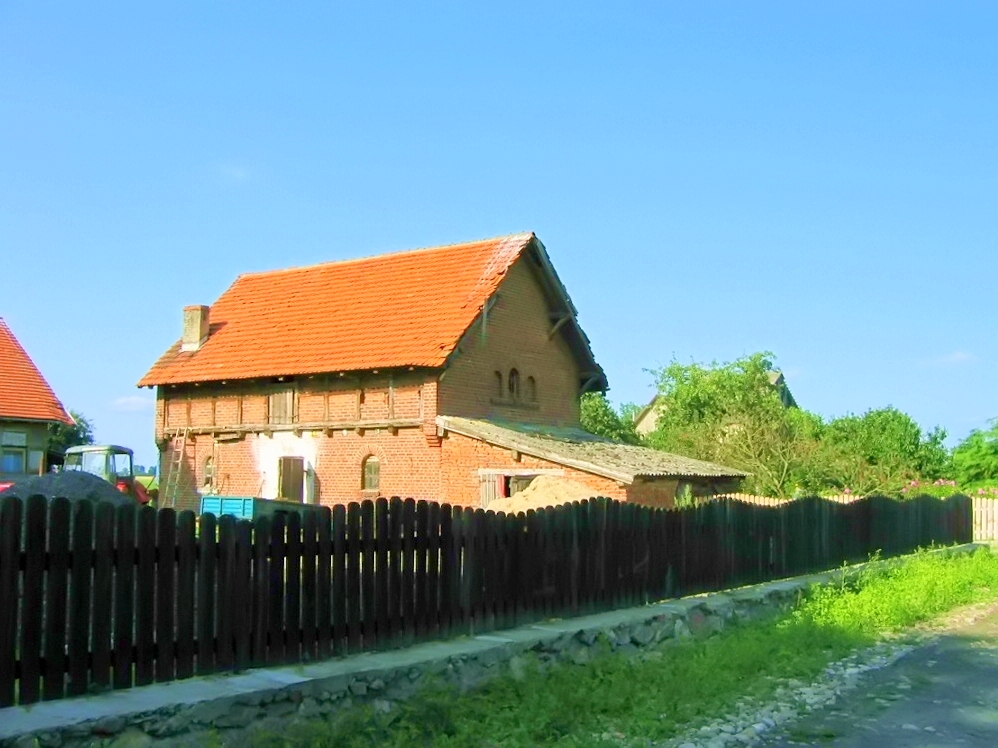

- Location within Poland
- Coordinates: 53°36′20″N 15°0′49″E
- Country: Poland
- Voivodeship: West Pomeranian
- County: Goleniów
- Gmina: Osina

Population
  - Total: 960
- Time zone: UTC+1 (CET)
  - Summer (DST): UTC+2 (CEST)
- Vehicle registration: ZGL
- Website: http://www.osina.pl/

Osina [ɔˈɕina] (German: Schönhagen) is a village in Goleniów County, West Pomeranian Voivodeship, in north-western Poland. It is the seat of the gmina (administrative district) called Gmina Osina. It lies approximately 15 km (9 mi) north-east of Goleniów and 36 km (22 mi) north-east of the regional capital Szczecin.

== History ==
The territory became part of the emerging Polish state under its first ruler Mieszko I around 967. Following the fragmentation of Poland, it was part of the Duchy of Pomerania, later under suzerainty of Denmark and the Holy Roman Empire. From the 18th century, it became part of Kingdom of Prussia and, from 1871 to 1945, part of Germany.

During World War II, the German Nazi government operated a forced labour subcamp of the prison in Goleniów in the village. After the defeat of Germany in 1945, according to the Potsdam Agreement, Osina was reintegrated into Poland.
