= Stepnica =

- Town
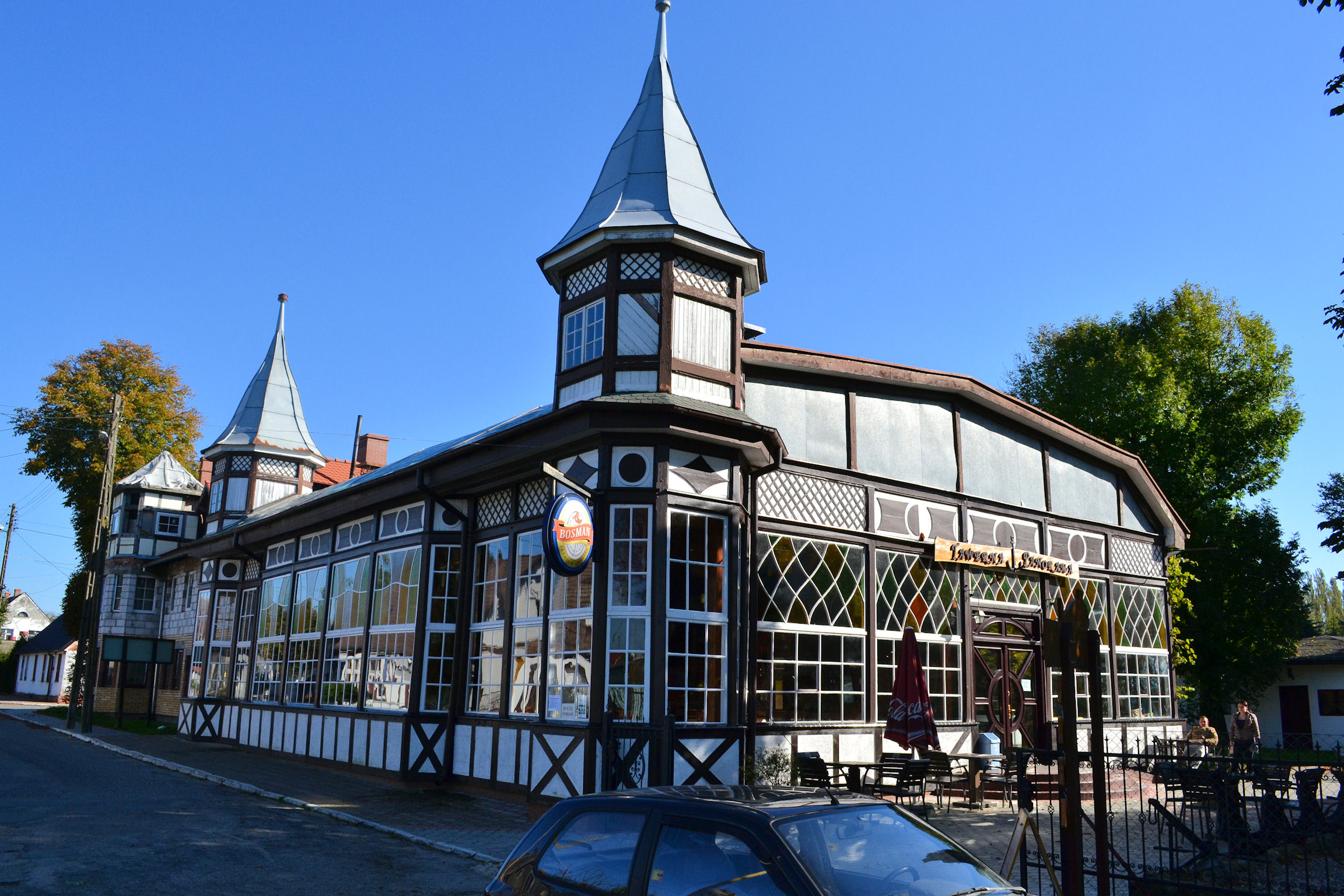
- Local tavern

- Coat of arms

- Location within Poland
- Coordinates: 53°39′13″N 14°37′57″E
- Country: Poland
- Voivodeship: West Pomeranian
- County: Goleniów
- Gmina: Stepnica

Population
  - Total: 2,067
- Time zone: UTC+1 (CET)
  - Summer (DST): UTC+2 (CEST)
- Vehicle registration: ZGL

Stepnica [stɛpˈnit͡sa] (German: Stepenitz, or Bad Stepenitz) is a town in Goleniów County, West Pomeranian Voivodeship, in north-western Poland. It is the seat of the gmina (administrative district) called Gmina Stepnica. It lies approximately 17 km (11 mi) north-west of Goleniów and 27 km (17 mi) north of Szczecin, the capital of the region.

Municipal law was given on 1 January 2014. The town has a population of 2,067.

Stepnica is situated near the estuary of the Oder River - Roztoka Odrzańska, south of the Szczecin Lagoon on the route canoe between Police and Trzebież.
