= Maszewo =

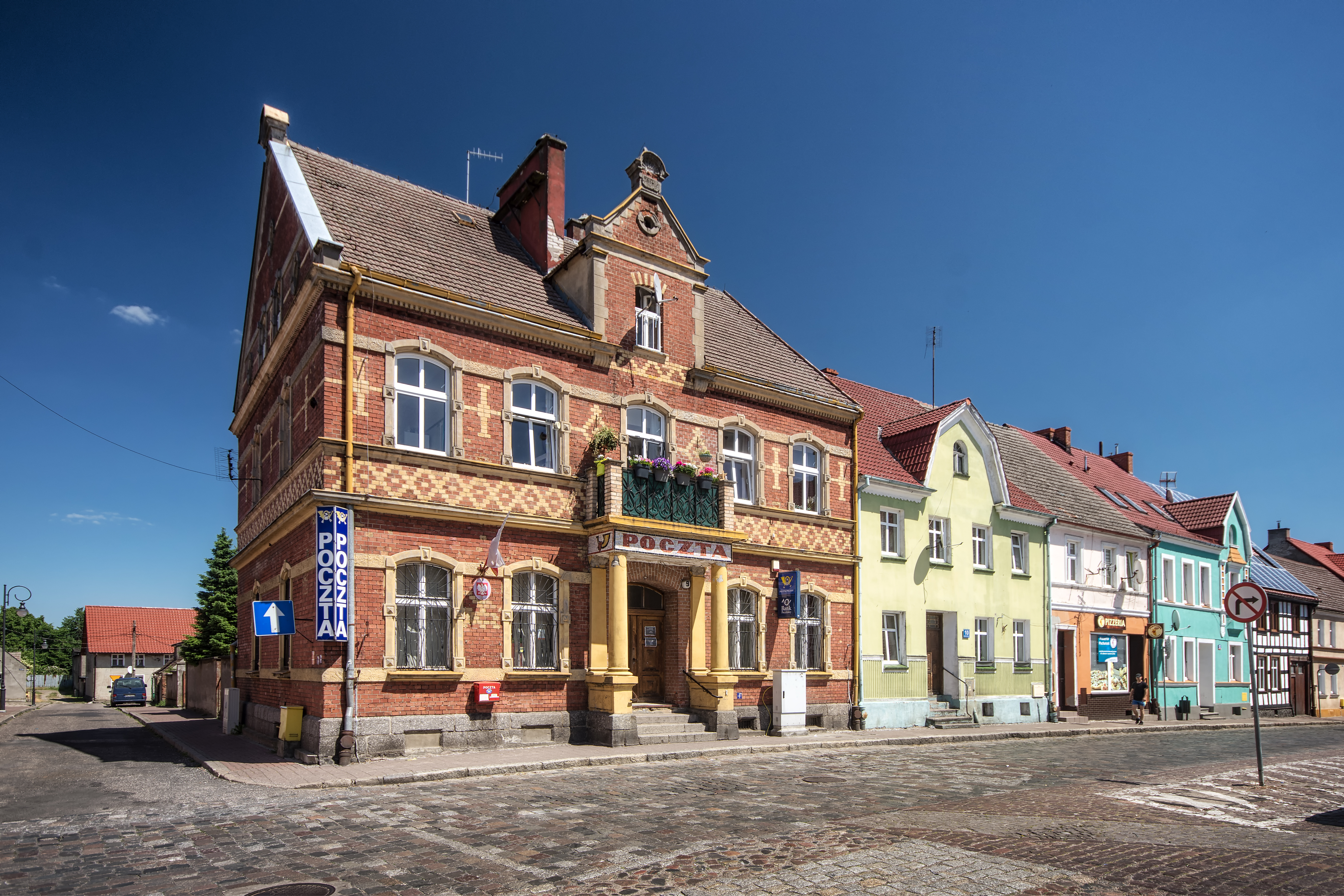
- Rynek (Market Square)

- Flag Coat of arms

- Location within Poland
- Coordinates: 53°29′N 15°4′E
- Country: Poland
- Voivodeship: West Pomeranian
- County: Goleniów
- Gmina: Maszewo

Area
  - Total: 5.56 km^{2} (2.15 sq mi)

Population (2006)
  - Total: 3,073
  - Density: 553/km^{2} (1,430/sq mi)
- Time zone: UTC+1 (CET)
  - Summer (DST): UTC+2 (CEST)
- Postal code: 72-130
- Vehicle registration: ZGL
- Website: http://www.maszewo.pl/

Maszewo [maˈʂɛvɔ] (German: Massow) is a town in Goleniów County, West Pomeranian Voivodeship, in north-western Poland.

== Geography ==
It is located in the historic region of Pomerania, between the towns of Goleniów, Nowogard, Dobra, Chociwel, and Stargard, approximately 20 km (12 mi) from each.

== History ==
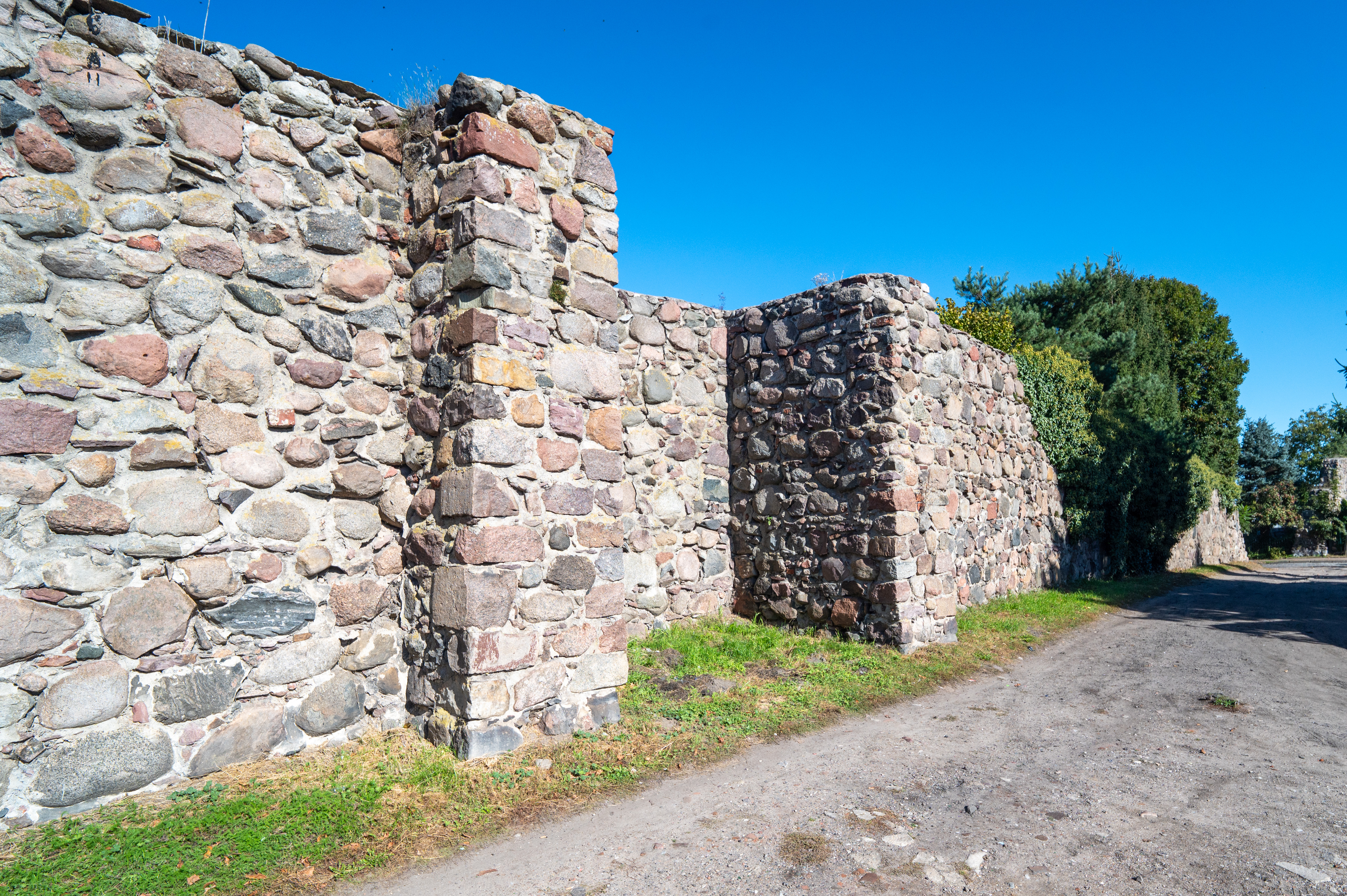
Medieval town walls

The town suffered during the Thirty Years' War, and in 1625 and 1638 many residents died due to epidemics.

Following the end of World War II, a statue to commemorate Allied soldiers of the Red Army was erected in the town. In 2025, the monument was pulled down on the initiative of the town's mayor in the context of the Russo-Ukrainian war. The destruction of the monument was publicly supported by Karol Polejowski. A replacement monument to post-war residents is scheduled to be erected in 2026.

== Demographics ==
Historical population

Year	Pop.	±%
1871	2,762	—
1880	2,815	+1.9%
1890	2,711	−3.7%
1900	2,673	−1.4%
1910	2,880	+7.7%

Year	Pop.	±%
1925	3,371	+17.0%
1950	1,977	−41.4%
1960	2,898	+46.6%
2016	3,377	+16.5%
