= Goleniów =

Town in West Pomeranian Voivodeship, Poland

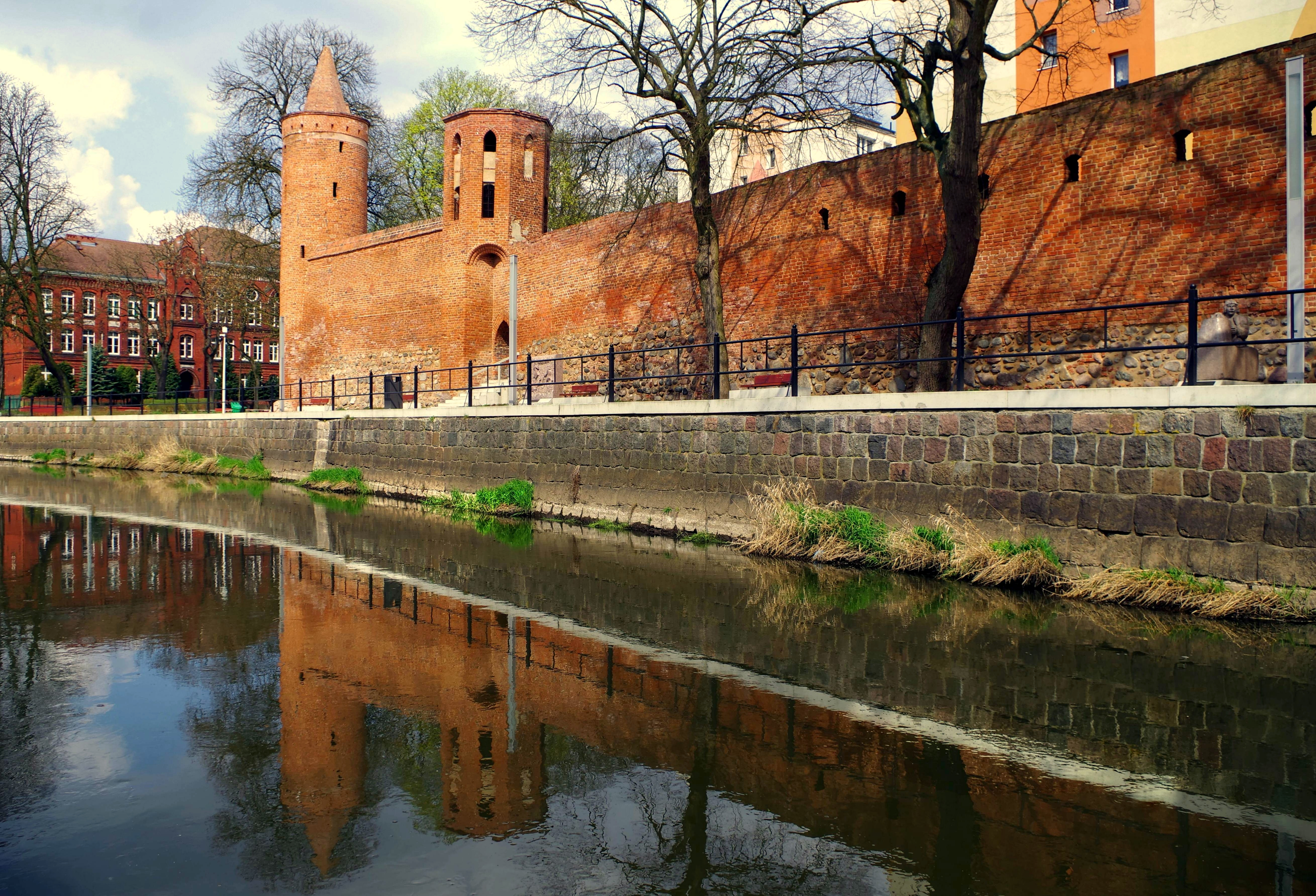
- Medieval defensive walls

- Flag Coat of arms

- Location within Poland
- Coordinates: 53°33′49″N 14°49′41″E
- Country: Poland
- Voivodeship: West Pomeranian
- County: Goleniów
- Gmina: Goleniów
- Established: 10th century
- Town rights: 1268

Government
  - Mayor: Krzysztof Sypień (Ind.)

Area
  - Total: 11.74 km^{2} (4.53 sq mi)
- Elevation: 15 m (49 ft)

Population (2021)
  - Total: 21,876
  - Density: 1,863/km^{2} (4,826/sq mi)
- Time zone: UTC+1 (CET)
  - Summer (DST): UTC+2 (CEST)
- Postal code: 72-100
- Area code: +48 91
- Car plates: ZGL
- Primary airport: Solidarity Szczecin–Goleniów Airport
- Website: http://www.goleniow.pl

Goleniów [ɡɔˈlɛɲuf] (Kashubian: Gòłonóg; German: Gollnow) is a town in Pomerania, northwestern Poland, with 21,876 inhabitants as of 2021. It is the capital of Goleniów County in West Pomeranian Voivodeship. It is situated in the centre of Goleniowska Forest on Goleniów Plain, near main roads numbers 3 and 6.

The international airport Szczecin-Goleniów "Solidarność" Airport is located just east of the town.

== History ==
The settlement dates back to the 10th century. Pomerania became part of the emerging Polish state under its first ruler Mieszko I around 967. As a result of the 12th-century fragmentation of Poland it became part of the separate Duchy of Pomerania, ruled by the House of Griffin. Barnim I, Duke of Pomerania granted the settlement Magdeburg town rights and additional privileges in 1264, yet Goleniów was rechartered with Lübeck Law, which favoured the local merchants, in 1314. The town grew by exploiting the vast timber reserves in the town-owned forests, and by trade. The town was connected to the Baltic Sea trade routes by the port of Ihnamünde (Inoujście) at the mouth of the Ina river. Competition with nearby Stettin (Szczecin) led to a series of conflicts between the two towns, the differences were set aside only in 1615 when the towns signed a reconciling treaty. The town remained part of the Duchy of Pomerania until Sweden took over in 1630.

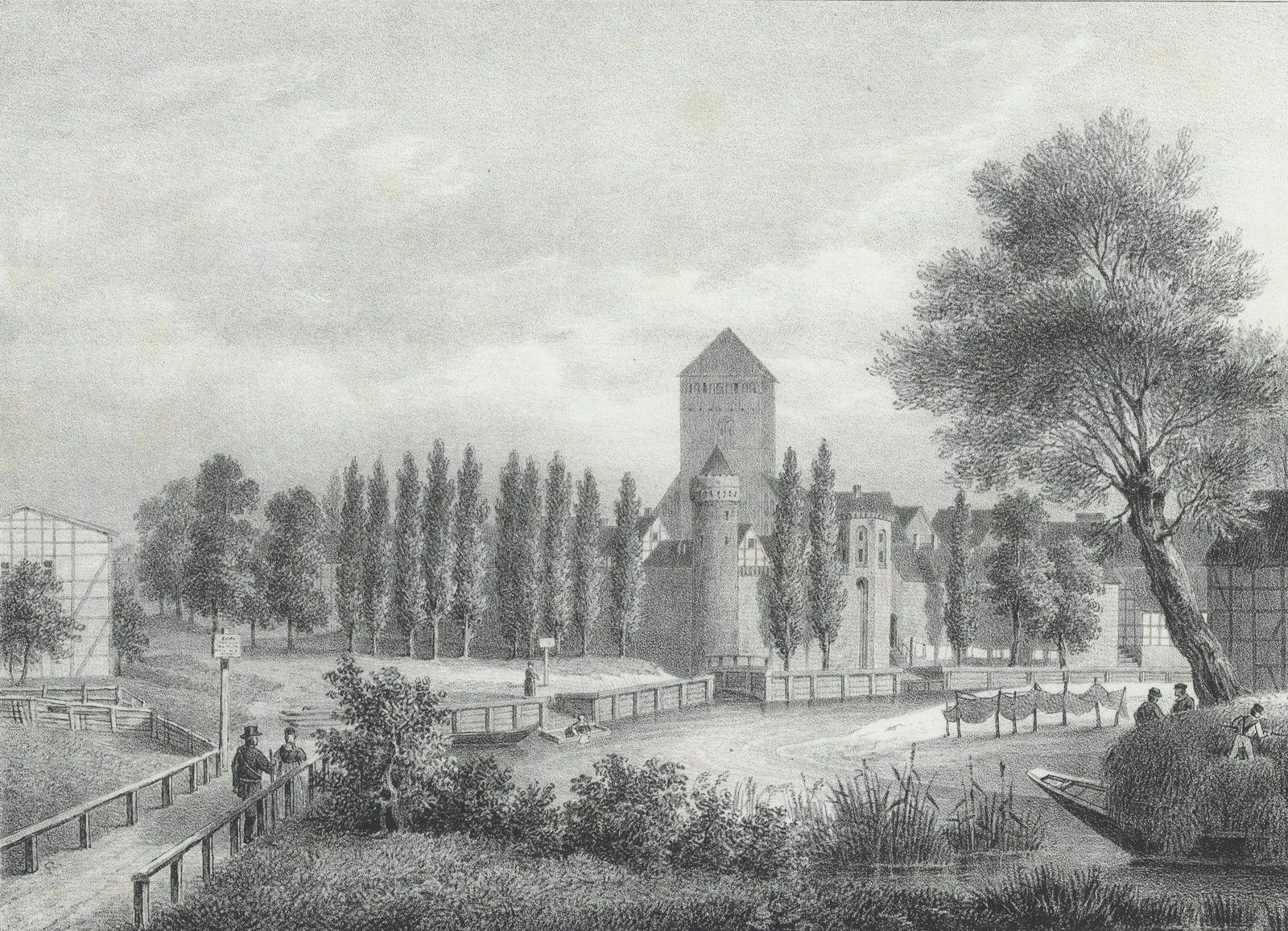
19th-century view of the town

The Thirty Years' War devastated the town, and as a consequence of the post-war Peace of Westphalia (1648) and Treaty of Stettin (1653), the town remained with Sweden who had occupied the area since the Treaty of Stettin (1630). The border with Brandenburg-Prussian Pomerania now ran close to the town, and cut Gollnow off from its economic hinterland, which hindered recovery from the war. Between 1677 and 1683, Gollnow was occupied by Brandenburg-Prussia. In the years that followed, the number of craftsmen in the town grew steadily. In 1720, Sweden lost its possessions south of the Peene and east of the Peenestrom rivers, including Gollnow, to Prussia in the Treaty of Stockholm. In the 19th century, craft and trade were joined by industry – Gollnow hosted a coppersmith, a needle fabrication, several facilities for the manufacturing of furniture, three breweries, a distillery, and five water mills. In the late 19th and early 20th century, the town became an important railroad junction, when it was connected to Neudamm (Dębno) and Naugard (Nowogard) in 1882, to Cammin (Kamień Pomorski) and Wollin (Wolin) in 1892, and to Massow in 1903. Gollnow was part of the Prussian province of Pomerania from 1815 to 1945. With the unification of Germany in 1871, it became part of the German Reich. In 1919, the German administration operated a camp in the town, in which they imprisoned Poles arrested in Szubin during the Greater Poland uprising.

During World War II, the Nazis operated two forced labour subcamps of the Stalag II-D prisoner-of-war camp and a prison in the town, with multiple forced labour subcamps located in the region. Polish forced labourers were imprisoned in the town. On 7 March 1945, the town was captured by the Red Army. After Nazi Germany's defeat in World War II, the area became once again part of Poland, although with a Soviet-installed communist regime, which stayed in power until the Fall of Communism in the 1980s. The town's German population was expelled in accordance with the Potsdam Agreement.

In 1954, town limits were expanded by including Helenów as Goleniów's new district. From 1975 to 1998, it was administratively located in the Szczecin Voivodeship.

Historic architecture and monuments of Goleniów (examples)

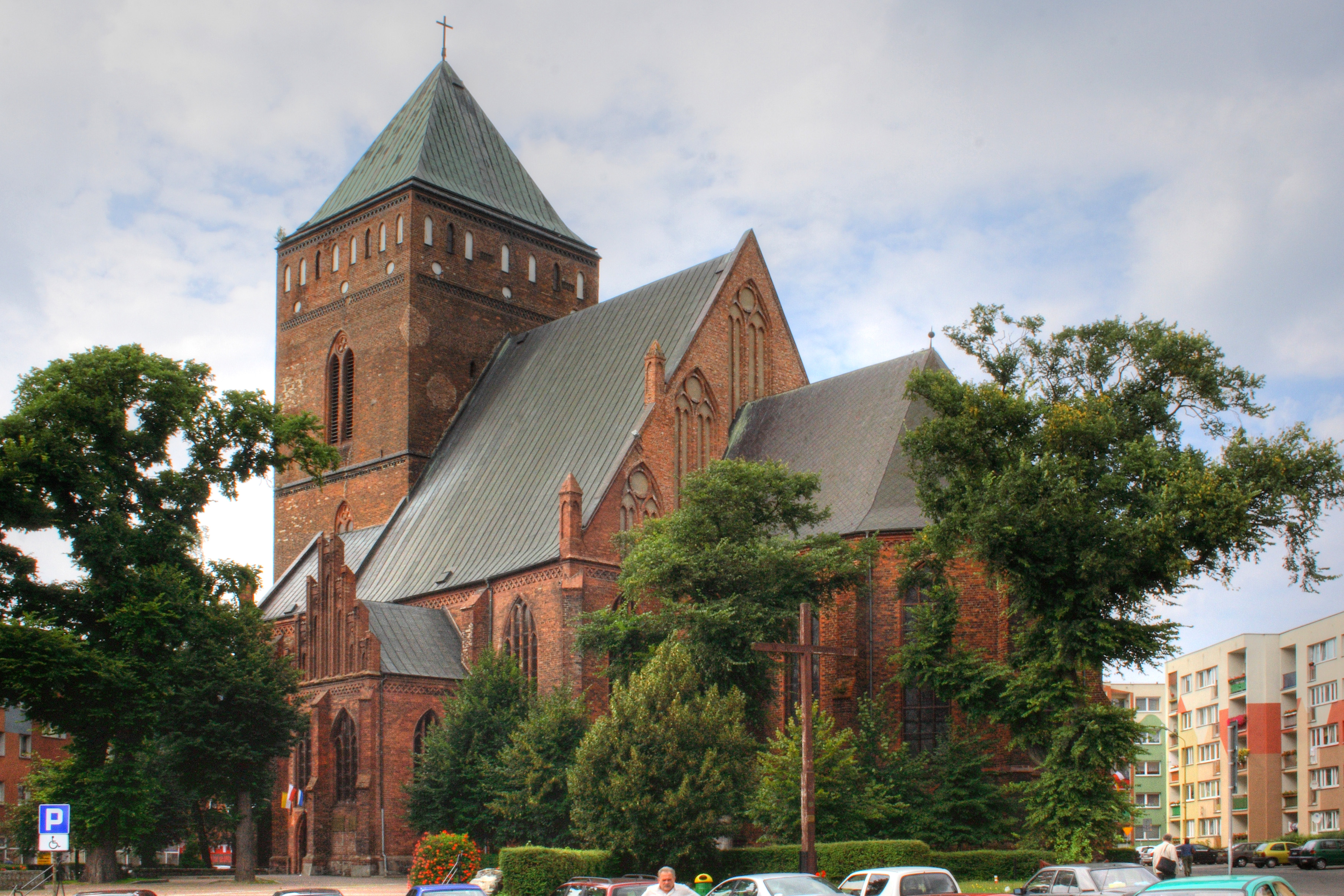
Gothic Saint Catherine's church

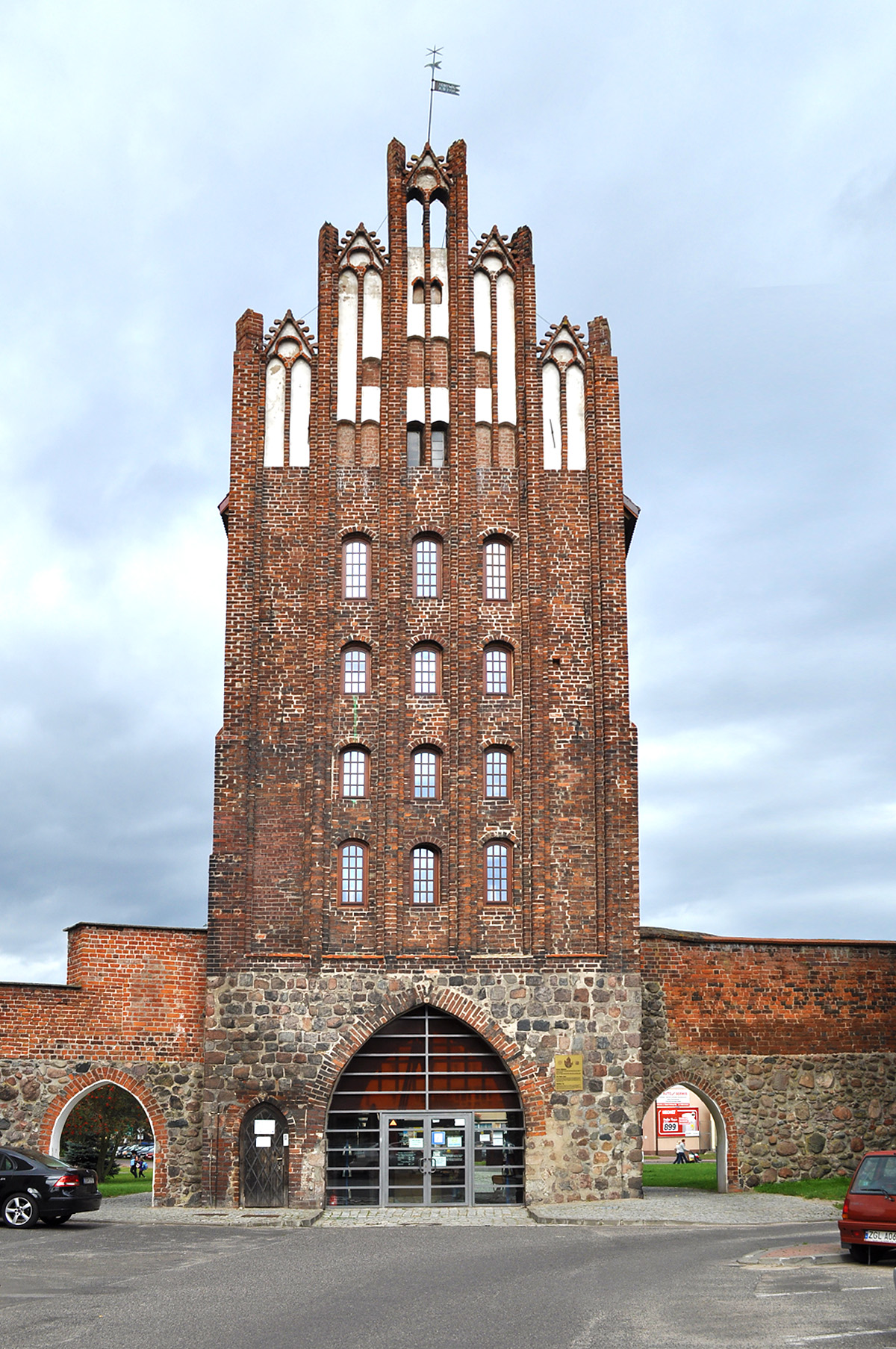
Wolin Gate

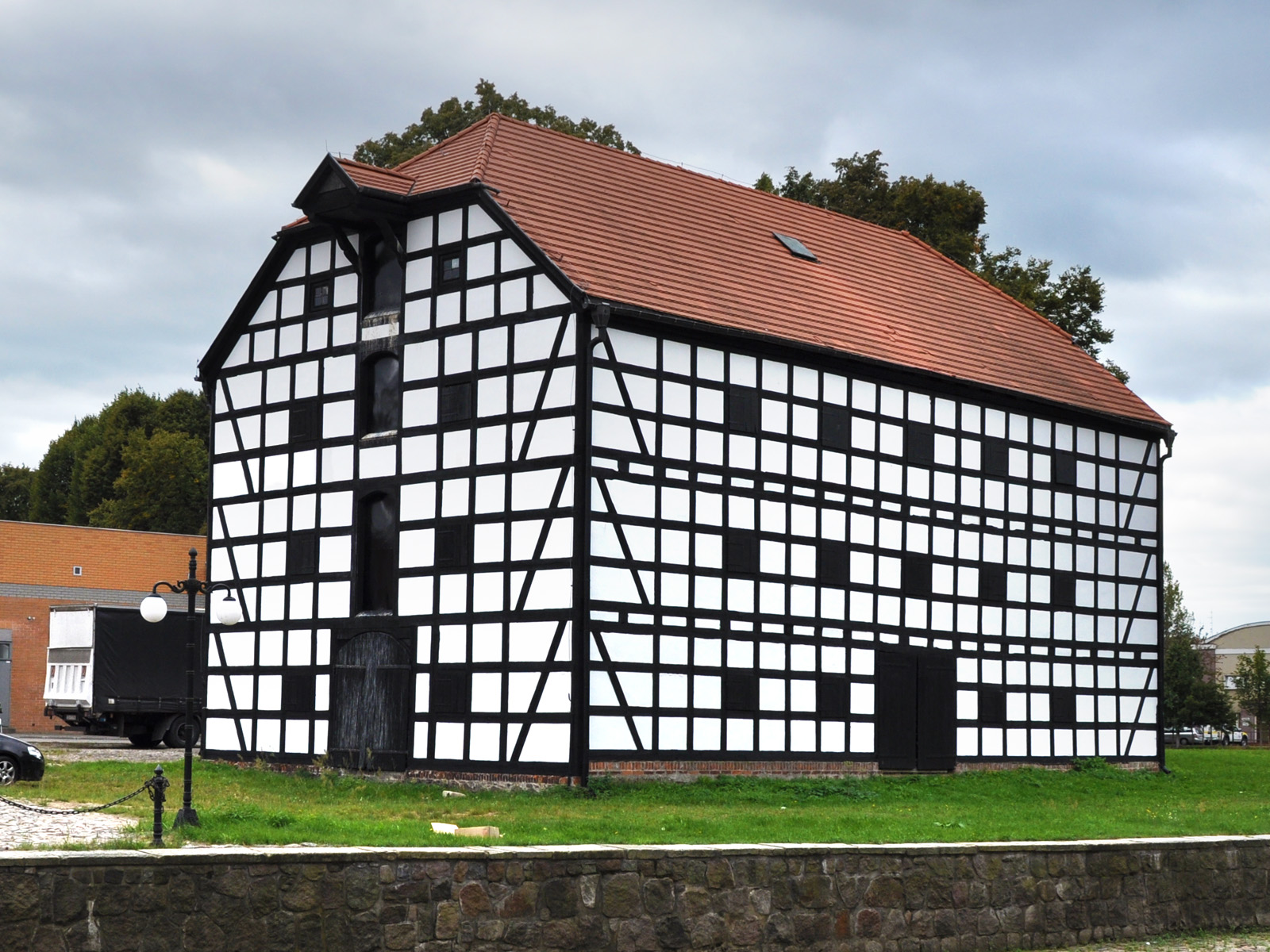
Old granary

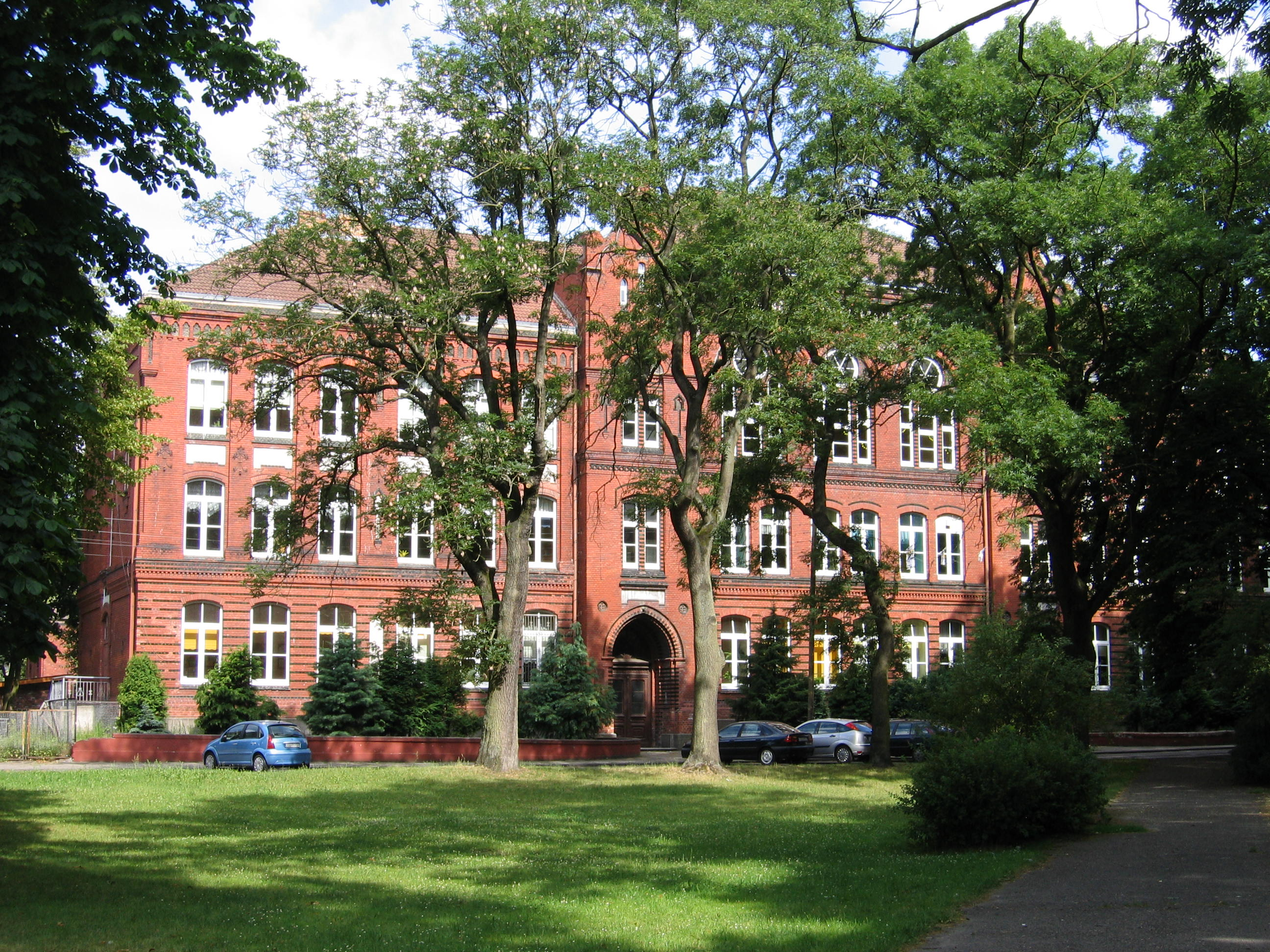
Elementary School No. 1

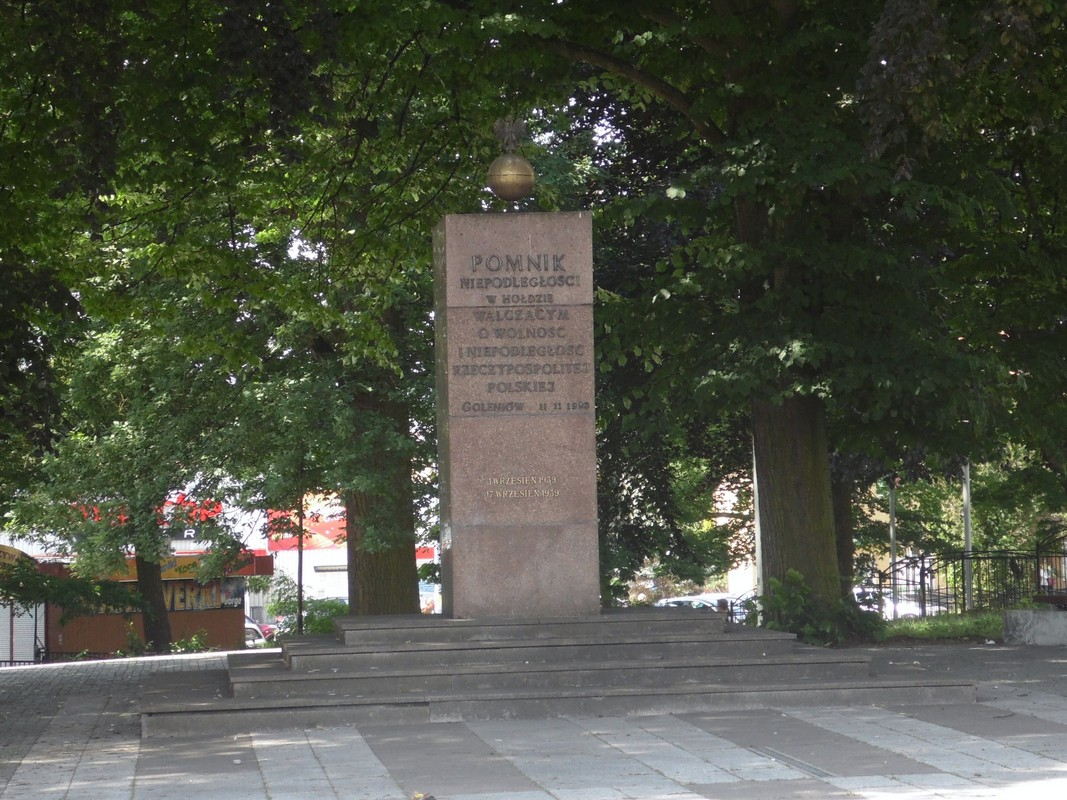
Polish Independence Monument

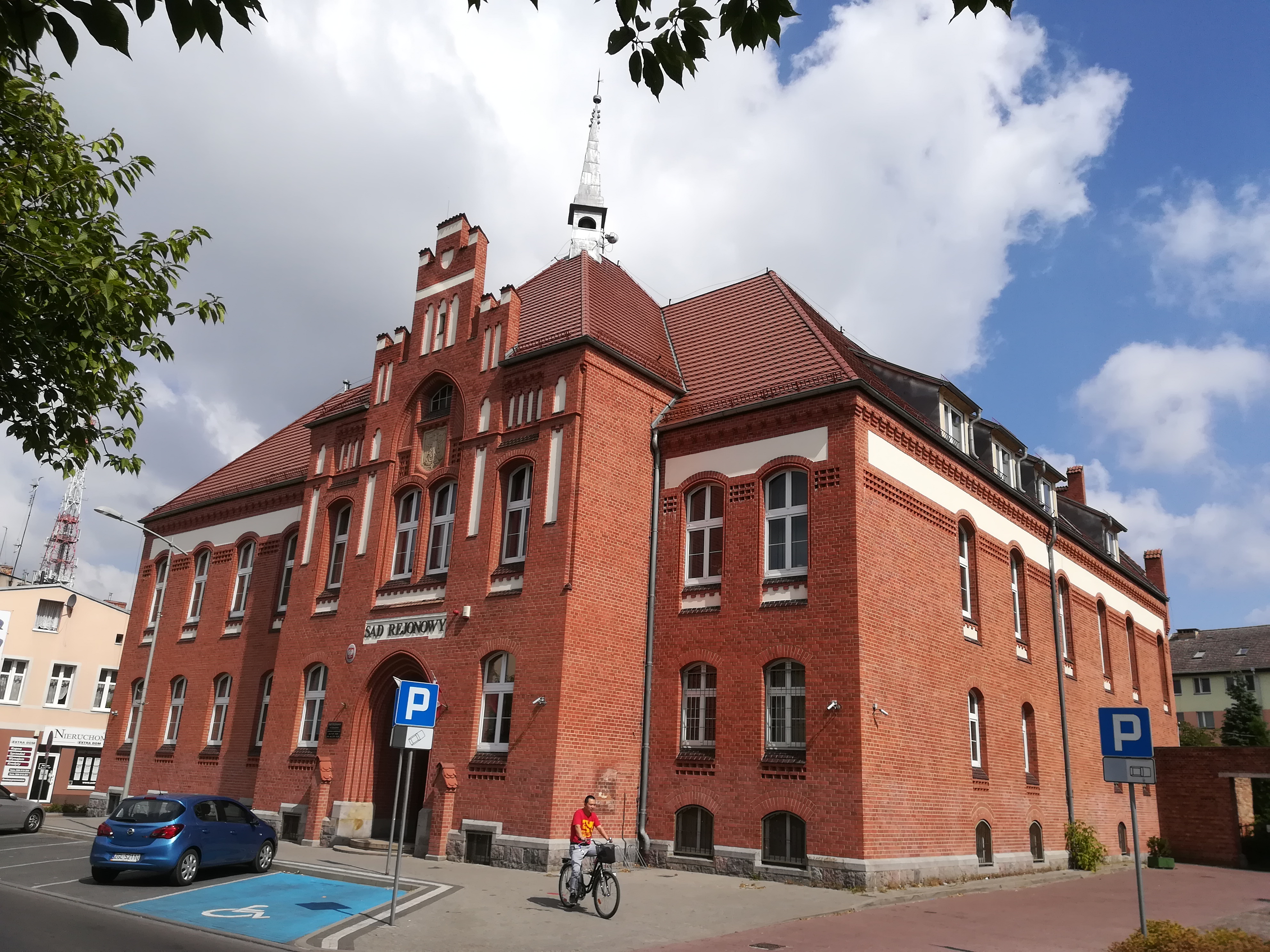
Courthouse

== Population ==
Historical population

Year	Pop.	±%
1745	1,677	—
1796	2,200	+31.2%
1811	2,929	+33.1%
1828	3,920	+33.8%
1843	4,911	+25.3%
1864	7,413	+50.9%
1871	7,272	−1.9%
1895	8,181	+12.5%
1910	10,258	+25.4%
1928	11,815	+15.2%
1938	13,500	+14.3%
1950	4,723	−65.0%

Year	Pop.	±%
1960	10,250	+117.0%
1970	14,700	+43.4%
1975	17,200	+17.0%
1980	19,100	+11.0%
1990	22,200	+16.2%
1995	22,200	+0.0%
2004	22,399	+0.9%
2007	22,399	+0.0%
2008	22,377	−0.1%
2011	22,844	+2.1%
2021	21,876	−4.2%

== Sports ==
The Goleniów Mile of Independence running competition is held annually in the town to commemorate Poland's National Independence Day. It is one of the oldest competitions of its kind in Poland.

The local football team is Ina Goleniów. It competes in the lower leagues.

== Twin towns and sister cities| ==
Goleniów is twinned with:

Bergen auf Rügen, Germany; Greifswald, Germany	Opmeer, Netherlands; Pyrzyce, Poland	Svedala, Sweden

=== Former twin towns ===
- Guryevsk, Russia

On 25 February 2022, Goleniów ended its partnership with the Russian city of Guryevsk as a reaction to the Russian invasion of Ukraine.

== Cities and towns near Goleniów ==
- Szczecin (Poland)
- Police, Poland
- Stargard (Poland)
- Maszewo (Poland)
- Nowogard (Poland)
- Kamień Pomorski (Poland)
- Wolin (town) (Poland)
- Golczewo (Poland)

== Tourist villages near Goleniów ==
- Jarszewko

== Notable people ==
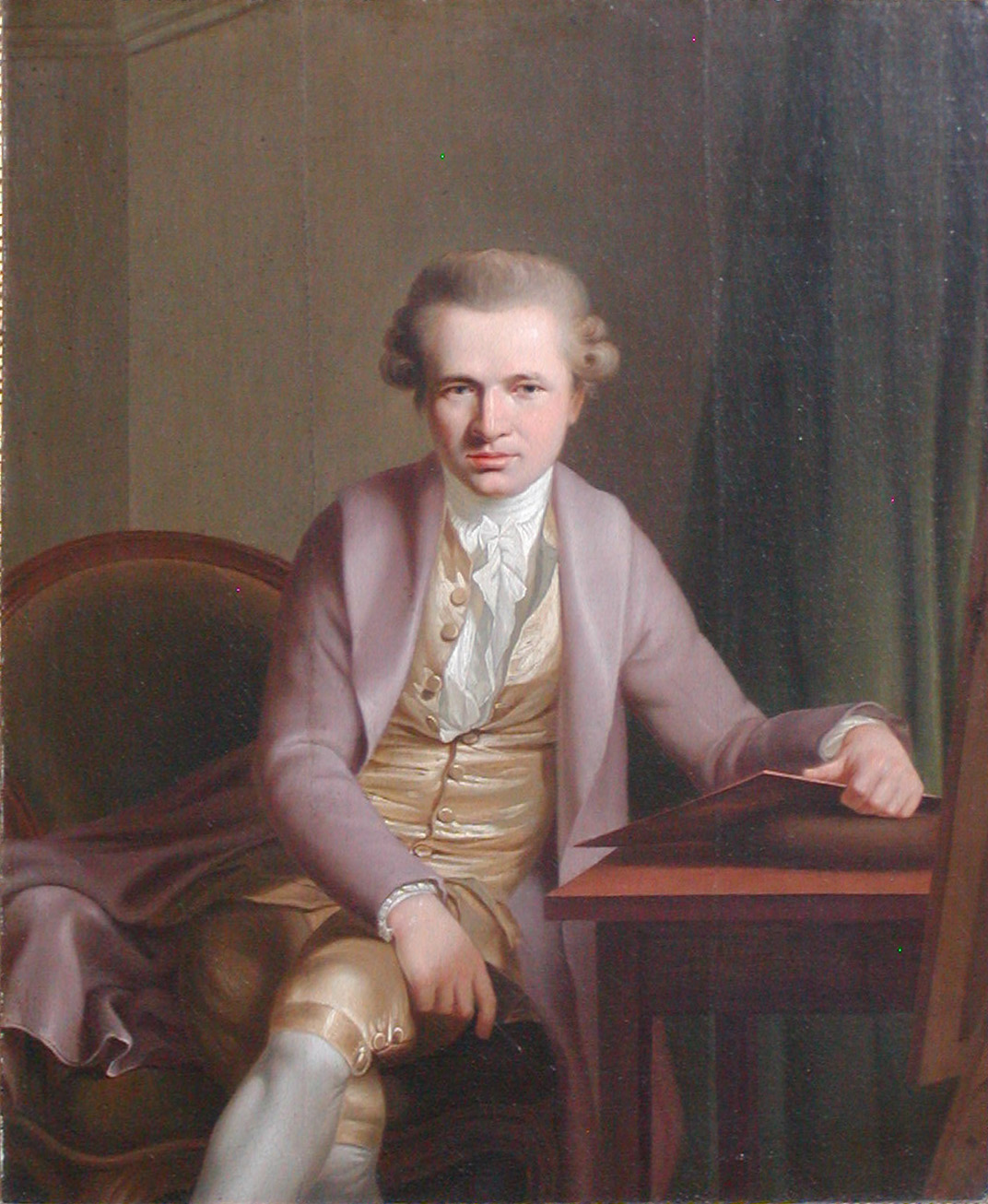
Johan Frederik Clemens, 1776

- Johan Frederik Clemens (1749–1831), Pomeranian-Danish printmaker in etching.
- Olgierd Geblewicz (born 1972), Polish politician, marshal of West Pomeranian Voivodeship
- Werner Kollath (1892–1970), German bacteriologist, hygienist and food scientist.
- Marek Leśniak (born 1964), Polish retired footballer, played over 500 pro games and 20 for Poland
- Natalia Piekarczyk (born 1988), Polish volleyball player
- Günther Marks (1897–1978), German church musician, organist and composer
- Helga Paris (1938-2024), German photographer
- Grzegorz Stępniak (born 1989), Polish professional racing cyclist
- Tom Swoon (born 1993), Polish DJ, remixer and record producer
