= Behm (disambiguation) =

Behm is a surname (including a list of people with the name).

Behm may also refer to:

- Behm (singer) (born 1994), Finnish singer-songwriter
- Behm Bank, an undersea bank in the Weddell Sea
- Behm Canal, in the United States
- Behm River, in Australia

== See also ==
- Boehm, a surname (including a list of people with the name)
- Böhm, a surname (including a list of people with the name)
- Böhme (disambiguation)
- Bohm (disambiguation)
