= Boehm (disambiguation) =

Boehm is a surname (including a list of people with the name).

Boehm may also refer to:

== Music ==
- Boehm flute

== Science and technology ==
- Boehm., botanical abbreviation for Georg Rudolf Boehmer (1723–1803)

== See also ==
- Böhm, a surname (including a list of people with the name)
- Böhme (disambiguation)
- Bohm (disambiguation)
