= Böhmer =

Böhmer, Boehmer or Bohmer is a German surname. Notable people with the surname include:

- Ben Böhmer, German DJ and composer
- Brenda Bohmer (born 1957), Canadian curler
- Christian Boehmer Anfinsen, biochemist and a 1972 Nobel Prize winner
- Edward Boehmer (1861–1940), American-born, London-based architect
- Georg Rudolf Boehmer (1723–1803), German botanist
- Irmgard Brendenal-Böhmer, German rower
- Hans-Joachim Böhmer (1940–1999), German double scull rower
- Harald von Boehmer, German immunologist
- Hasso von Boehmer (1904–1945), German colonel who participated in the 20 July Plot against Hitler
- Henning von Boehmer (born 1943), German author, publisher, lawyer and journalist
- Johann Friedrich Böhmer, German historian
- Justus Henning Boehmer, German ecclesiastical jurist
- Konrad Boehmer, Dutch composer and writer
- Maria Böhmer, German politician
- Philipp Adolf Böhmer (1711–1789), German physician
- Wolfgang Böhmer (1936–2025), German politician (CDU)

== See also ==
- Böhmer integral in mathematics
- Böhm
- Boehm
- Böhme (disambiguation)
- Boehner
