= Böhme (surname) =

Böhme (also Boehme) is a German surname. Notable people with the surname include:

- Andy Böhme (born 1970), German skeleton racer
- Anton Wilhelm Böhme (1673–1722), German Lutheran author and translator
- Brigitte Boehme (born 1940), German judge and president of church administration
- Erich Böhme (1930–2009), German journalist and television host
- Erwin Böhme (1879–1917), German fighter pilot in World War I
- Franz Böhme (1885–1947), Austrian and German general during World War II
- Franz Magnus Böhme (1827–1898), German musicologist and composer
- Georg Böhme (1926–2016), German politician
- Gernot Böhme (1937–2022), German philosopher and author
- Günter Böhme (1913–1988), German politician
- Herbert Böhme (1907–1971), German poet
- Herbert A.E. Böhme (1897–1984), German actor
- Horst Böhme (disambiguation), several people with this name
- Horst Wolfgang Böhme (born 1940), German archaeologist
- Ibrahim Böhme (1944–1999), German politician
- Jakob Böhme (1575–1624), Christian mystic
- Jörg Böhme (born 1974), German retired footballer
- Kurt Böhme (1908–1989), German opera singer
- Marco Böhme (born 1990), German politician
- Marcus Böhme (born 1985), German volleyball player
- Margarete Böhme (1867–1939), German writer of the early 20th century
- Marita Böhme (born 1939), German actress
- Oskar Böhme (1870–1938), German composer and trumpeter
- Robert Böhme (born 1981), German footballer
- Rolf Böhme (1934–2019), German politician and mayor
- Wolfgang Böhme (born 1949), East German former handball player

== See also ==
- Böhm
