= Behm =

Behm is a surname of Germanic origin. The name refers to:

- Alexander Behm (1880–1952), German physicist
- Art Behm (b. 1932), American politician from North Dakota; state legislator
- Charles Behm (1883–?), Luxembourgish Olympic gymnast
- Cornelia Behm (b. 1951), German politician from Brandenburg
- Ernst Behm (1830–1884), German geographer and statistician
- Forrest Behm (1919–2015), American college football player
- Georgianna Behm, American politician
- Magnus von Behm (1727–1806), Russian governor of Kamchatka
  - Eponym of the Behm Canal
- Marc Behm (1925–2007), American novelist, actor and screenwriter
- Margarete Behm (1860–1929), German politician
- Roger Behm (1929–2005), Luxembourgish Olympic boxer
- Rita Behm, (b. 1994) Finnish singer

== See also ==
- Boehm
- Bohm
