= Beh =

Beh or BEH may refer to:

- Beh (letter), the second letter of many Semitic abjads
- Beh (surname), a Chinese, German, and Liberian surname
- Southwest Michigan Regional Airport (IATA: BEH), in Benton Harbor, Michigan
- Bulgarian Energy Holding, a Bulgarian state-owned energy company
- Beryllium monohydride, a molecule with the formula BeH
