= Herbord =

Herbord is a name. Notable people with the name include:

- Herbord Osl, Hungarian nobleman
- Herbord Sigismund Ludwig von Bar, German lawyer
- Ferdinand Herbord Ivar, Prince of Bismarck, or Ferdinand von Bismarck
- Herbord Karl Friedrich Bienemann von Bienenstamm (1778-1840), German-Baltic landowner, publicist and geographer
- Herbord of Michelsberg (died 1168), German monk
- Herbord of Fulstein (died 1288), Moravian nobleman

== See also ==
- Herburt
- Herbert (disambiguation)
