= Horst Böhme =

Horst Böhme may refer to:

- Horst Böhme (SS officer) (1909–1945), leading perpetrator of the Holocaust.
- Horst Böhme (chemist) (1908–1996), German chemist
- Horst Wolfgang Böhme (born 1940), German archaeologist

== See also ==
- Böhme (surname)
