= Herbord Sigismund Ludwig von Bar =

Ludwig von Bar
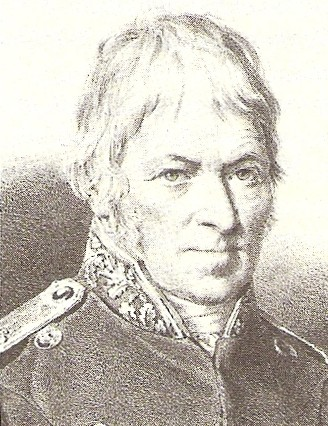
- Ludwig von Bar
- Born: Herbord Sigismund Ludwig von Bar; 1 November 1763; Wasserburg Alt Barenaue, Electorate of Brunswick-Lüneburg
- Died: 20 November 1844; Osnabrück, Hanover
- Burial place: Johannis Cemetery (Osnabrück)
- Occupations: Jurist/lawyer; Politician/statesman
- Spouse: Regine Catharine Charlotte Dürfeld / von Bar (1769–1834)

Herbord Sigismund Ludwig von Bar (1 November 1763 – 20 December 1844) was a lawyer in the Electorate of Brunswick-Lüneburg who became a politician and public official, serving at one stage as president of the provisional parliament in the Kingdom of Hanover. His career spanned the French occupation and its aftermath.

== Life ==
=== Early years ===
Ludwig von Bar was born at Wasserburg Alt Barenaue, the originally moated family manor house sited on a slightly raised piece of ground in the generally marshy countryside to the north of Osnabrück. He was a grandson of the landowner-writer Georg Ludwig von Bar and heir to the family estates in the Prince-Bishopric of Osnabrück.

Von Bar studied jurisprudence at Göttingen where his tutors included Johann Stephan Pütter. On 30 November 1785 he was appointed a government auditor with the state legal department, based initially in Hanover. Fairly soon he was promoted and transferred to the chancelry department in Osnabrück, where he made contact with a longstanding family friend, Justus Möser, an erudite and by this time venerable lawyer and reformer with whom, as von Bar much later recalled with affection, he spent many agreeable evenings during the final five years of Moser's life. When Moser died in 1794 von Bar was a substantial beneficiary under the will.

=== After 1803 ===
Everything changed with the French invasion in 1803 and the establishment, formally in 1805, of the Confederation of the Rhine, sponsored by France. Representing the Osnabrück regional administration, von Bar became a member of the standing deputation of the Kingdom of Westphalia, which in 1807 travelled to Fontainbleu and Paris in order to provide advice on a constitution for the puppet kingdom. A year later he was appointed president of the Court of First Instance in Osnabrück. He was also the special liquidator in respect of the national debt of the former Prince-Bishopric of Osnabrück. Between 1808 and 1811 he was a member of the electoral college for the short-lived Weser department. Along with that, he was a member of the (almost equally short-lived) quasi-parliamentary assembly of the Kingdom of Westphalia.

From 1808 till 1813 von Bar was a member of the Domestic and Justice departments of the National Council (appointed to the council on 25 October 1808), based in Kassel. He was also a chancelry officer ("Kanzleirat") and consistory director based in Osnabrück. He was rewarded for his public service with public honours: In 1810 he was appointed a knight of the newly formed Order of the Crown of Westphalia, and in 1811 he was appointed a Commander of the order.

=== After 1814 ===
The Kingdom of Westphalia was terminated in 1814 with the defeat of the emperor's Napoleonic imperial project. Its territorial extent was subsumed into an enlarged Kingdom of Hanover. Ludwig von Bar served between 1814 and 1819 as a member of the provisional quasi-parliament for the territory, representing the Osnabrück knightly class ("der Ritterschaft des Fürstentums Osnabrück"). He officiated initially as the assembly's legal counsel before being appointed, still in 1815, as its president. From time to time - for the first time in 1816 - he also served as president of the royal regional council ("königliche Provinzialverwaltung") for Osnabrück. Following changes to the constitutional structure, he was appointed to the newly revived post of Landdrost for Osnabrück in 1823, which effectively made him Hanover's most senior public administrative official in Osnabrück. He was appointed to the Hanoverian privy council in 1835.
