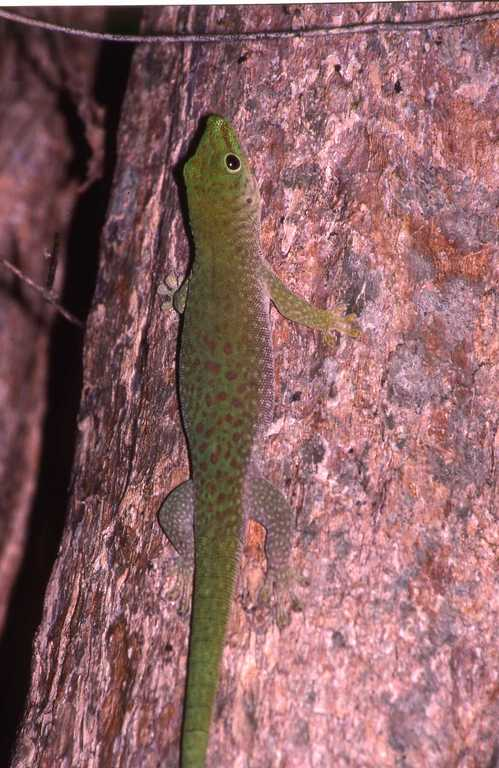

Conservation status
- Least Concern (IUCN 3.1)

Scientific classification
- Kingdom: Animalia
- Phylum: Chordata
- Class: Reptilia
- Order: Squamata
- Suborder: Gekkota
- Family: Gekkonidae
- Genus: Phelsuma
- Species: P. madagascariensis
- Subspecies: P. m. kochi

Trinomial name
- Phelsuma madagascariensis kochi Mertens, 1954

Synonyms
- Phelsuma madagascariensis kochi Mertens, 1954; Phelsuma kochi Raxworthy et al., 2007

= Koch's giant day gecko =

Subspecies of lizard

Koch's giant day gecko (Phelsuma madagascariensis kochi), also known commonly as Koch's day gecko, the Madagascar day gecko, and the Maevatanana day gecko, is a diurnal subspecies of gecko, a lizard in the family Gekkonidae. The subspecies is native to northwestern and western Madagascar and typically inhabits trees. It feeds on insects and nectar.

== Etymology ==
The subspecific name, kochi, is in honor of German ornithologist and herpetologist K.L. Koch of the Naturmuseum Senckenberg in Frankfurt.

== Taxonomy and systematics ==
Koch's giant day gecko is often treated as its own species, Phelsuma kochi Mertens, 1954.

== Description ==
P. m. kochi is among the largest living day geckos. It can reach a total length (including tail) of 30.5 centimetres (12.0 in). The body colour is a dark, dull green. A faint red stripe extends from the nostril to the eye. On the back there may be little reddish dots present. The neck and flanks often are light grey. The ventral side is off-white.

== Geographic range ==
P. m. kochi is widely distributed in northwestern and western Madagascar on the coast and in the inland. It was first discovered in the region around Maevatanana, where the holotype was collected.

== Habitat ==
P. m. kochi is often found on different trees such as banana trees where it can be seen basking. It avoids human dwellings. The climate is very dry throughout the year and the temperature can be as high as 40 °C (104 °F).

== Diet ==
Koch's giant day gecko feeds on various insects and other invertebrates. It also like to lick soft, sweet fruit, pollen and nectar.

== Behaviour ==
This subspecies, P. m. kochi, is not quite as quarrelsome and aggressive as P. m. madagascariensis and P. m. grandis.

== Reproduction ==
The pairing season for P. m. kochi is between November and the first weeks of May. During this period, the sexually mature females lay up to 6 pairs of eggs. At a temperature of 28 °C (82 °F), the young will hatch after approximately 63–68 days. The juveniles measure 65 mm (2.6 in) and reach sexual maturity after one year.

== Care and maintenance in captivity ==
P. m. kochi should be housed in pairs although successful group breeding with one male and several females has been reported. They need a large, well planted terrarium. The temperature should be about 28 °C (82 °F) during the day. The humidity should be maintained around 65%. In captivity, these animals can be fed with crickets, wax moths, fruit flies, mealworms, and houseflies.
