= Duchy of Magdeburg =

Duchy in Central Europe between 1680–1807

Coordinates: 51°51′N 12°03′E

Duchy of Magdeburg Herzogtum Magdeburg (German)
- 1680–1807
- Coat of arms

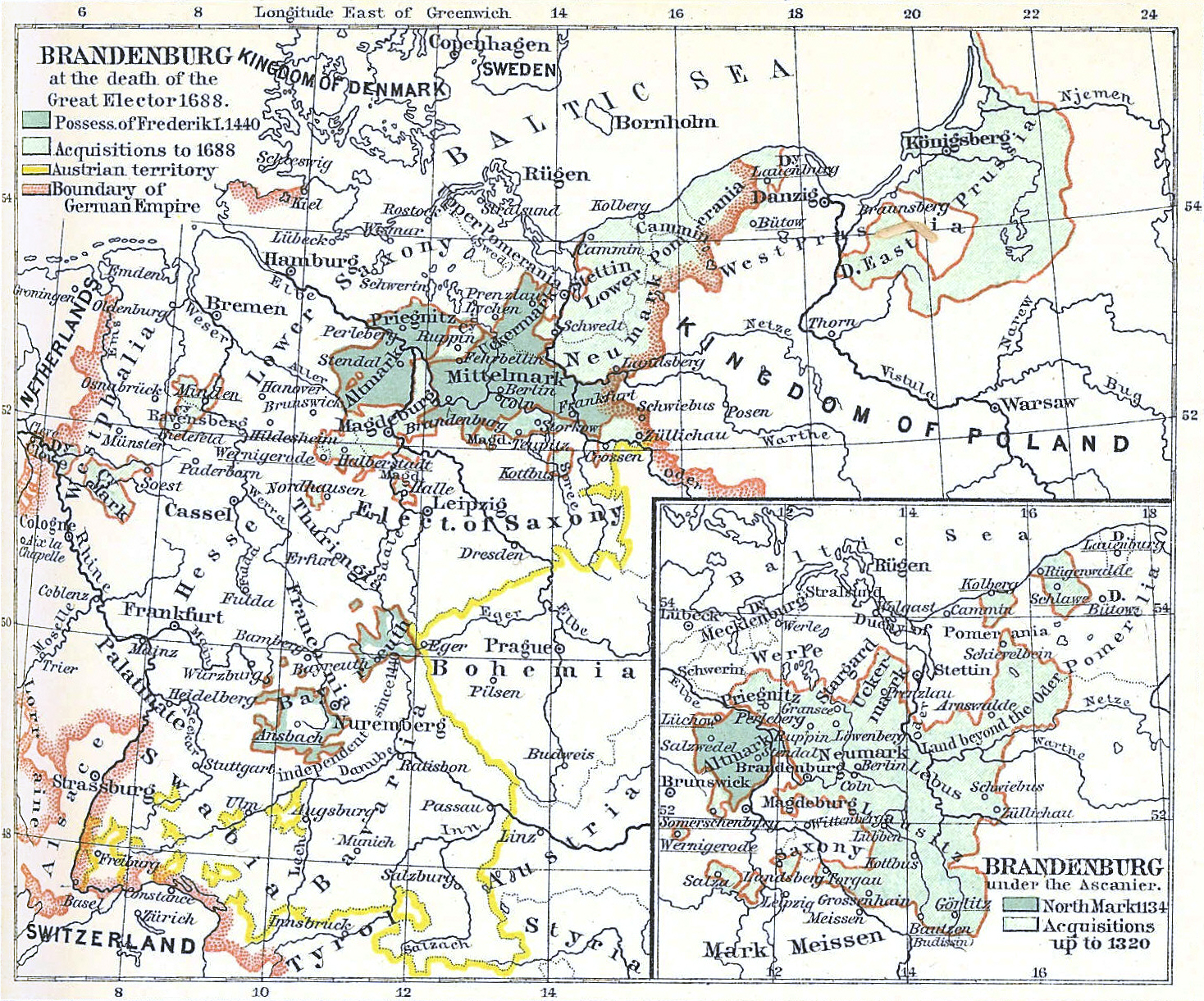
- The Duchy of Magdeburg within Brandenburg-Prussia at the death of the Great Elector (1688)
- Status: Fief of Brandenburg (1680–1701); Fief of Prussia (1701–1807)
- Capital: Magdeburg, Halle
- Religion: Lutheran
- Government: Duchy
- History
  - Archbishopric of Magdeburg secularised: 1680
  - Joined Kingdom of Prussia: 1701
  - Disestablished: 1807
Preceded by	Succeeded by
Archbishopric of Magdeburg	Kingdom of Westphalia; Kingdom of Prussia

The Duchy of Magdeburg (German: Herzogtum Magdeburg) was a province of the Margraviate of Brandenburg from 1680 to 1701 and a province of the German Kingdom of Prussia from 1701 to 1807. It replaced the Archbishopric of Magdeburg after its secularization by Brandenburg, giving to the Elector another influential seat to the Reichstag’s College of Princes. The duchy's capitals were Magdeburg and Halle, while Burg was another important town. Dissolved during the Napoleonic Wars in 1807, its territory was made part of the Province of Saxony in 1815.

== History ==
The Archbishopric of Magdeburg began to be administered by secular princes, mostly Lutheran, in 1545 during the Protestant Reformation. In the 1648 Treaty of Westphalia, the archbishopric was promised to the House of Hohenzollern of the Margraviate of Brandenburg upon the death of its incumbent administrator, August, Duke of Saxe-Weissenfels. The city of Magdeburg was also required to pay homage to the prince-electors of Brandenburg. In 1666, Elector Frederick William used his developing army to install a permanent Brandenburger garrison in the city.

Brandenburg-Prussia inherited the Archbishopric of Magdeburg upon the death of August of Saxe-Weissenfels in 1680 and reorganized the secularized territory as the Duchy of Magdeburg, with the electors of Brandenburg as hereditary dukes. The Halle region (Saalkreis), an exclave of the province, was surrounded by the Principality of Anhalt, the County of Mansfeld (acquired by Prussia in 1790), and the Electorate of Saxony. Against the wishes of the duchy's Lutheran nobility, a Calvinist chancellor was appointed to govern the duchy. Through the leadership of August Hermann Francke, Halle became the center of Pietism in Brandenburg-Prussia.

When Elector Frederick III crowned himself Frederick I, King in Prussia, in 1701, the Duchy of Magdeburg became part of the new Kingdom of Prussia. King Frederick William I's 'allodification of the fiefs', or efforts to modernize feudal land ownership laws, was opposed by the duchy's Junker nobility, which feared losing their tax-exempt status. The nobles received judgements from the imperial court in Vienna protecting their rights in 1718 and 1725. Justus Henning Böhmer became chancellor of the province in 1743.

With the creation of the General Directory in 1723 by Frederick William I, the Duchy of Magdeburg, the Principality of Halberstadt, and the Margraviate of Brandenburg were administered by the second department of the General Directory. A state-capitalized agricultural credit union (Landschaft) was created in the duchy in 1780 for the exclusive use of the nobility. Control over the Magdeburg lands gave the monarchy a lucrative monopoly over the Stassfurt and Halle salt deposits.

The estates of Pomerania voluntarily raised 5,000 troops for the Prussian Army during the Seven Years' War; their initiative was duplicated by the nobility of Magdeburg and neighboring provinces.

In the War of the Fourth Coalition, Prussia was defeated by Napoleon in 1806. In the Treaty of Tilsit the following year, the Duchy of Magdeburg was dissolved. The ducal territory west of the Elbe River, including the cities of Magdeburg and Halle, were made part of the Kingdom of Westphalia, a client state of the First French Empire. The ducal territory east of the Elbe remained in a drastically reduced Kingdom of Prussia.

Prussia reacquired the Magdeburg and Halle territories during the War of the Sixth Coalition. In 1815, after the Napoleonic Wars, the territories of the Duchy of Magdeburg, the Altmark, and part of the Kingdom of Saxony were coalesced to create the new Prussian Province of Saxony.
