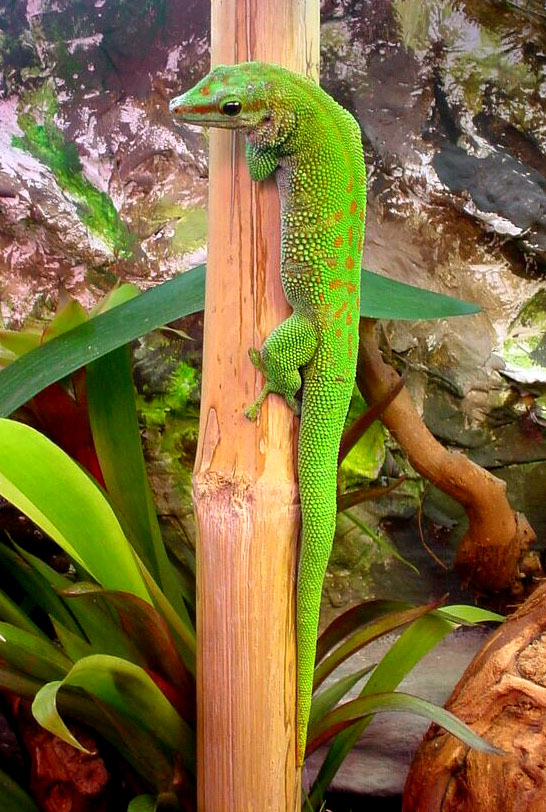
- Madagascar day gecko (Phelsuma madagascariensis madagascariensis)

Conservation status
- Least Concern (IUCN 3.1)

Scientific classification
- Kingdom: Animalia
- Phylum: Chordata
- Class: Reptilia
- Order: Squamata
- Suborder: Gekkota
- Family: Gekkonidae
- Genus: Phelsuma
- Species: P. madagascariensis

Binomial name
- Phelsuma madagascariensis (Gray, 1831)
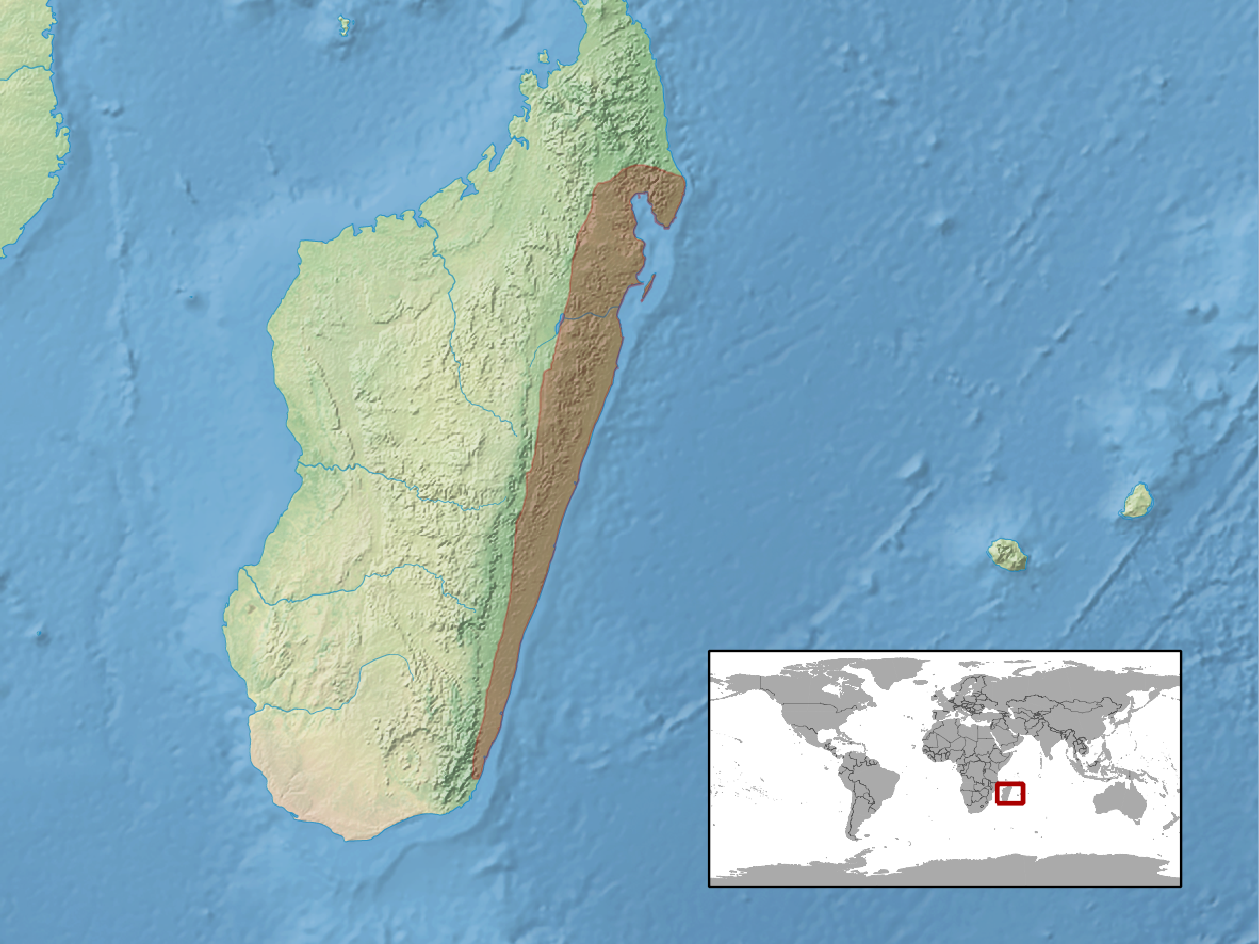

Synonyms
- Gekko madagascariensis Gray 1831; Phelsuma madagascariensis martensi Mertens, 1962

= Phelsuma madagascariensis =

Species of lizard

Phelsuma madagascariensis is a species of day gecko that lives in Madagascar. It is among the most widespread day geckos and is found in a wide range of habitats. With a length of up to 30.5 centimetres (12.0 in), it is also the largest day gecko in Madagascar. (The highly restricted Round Island day gecko is the only other extant species with a similar maximum length; the extinct Rodrigues giant day gecko was even larger.)

== Subspecies ==
There are several subspecies:

- Phelsuma madagascariensis madagascariensis (Madagascar day gecko)
- Phelsuma madagascariensis kochi (Koch's giant day gecko)
- Phelsuma madagascariensis boehmei (Boehme's giant day gecko)

Phelsuma grandis, the Madagascar giant day gecko, was previously considered a subspecies of Phelsuma madagascariensis but has now been elevated to a full species.
