= Kristy Augustin =

German politician (born 1979)

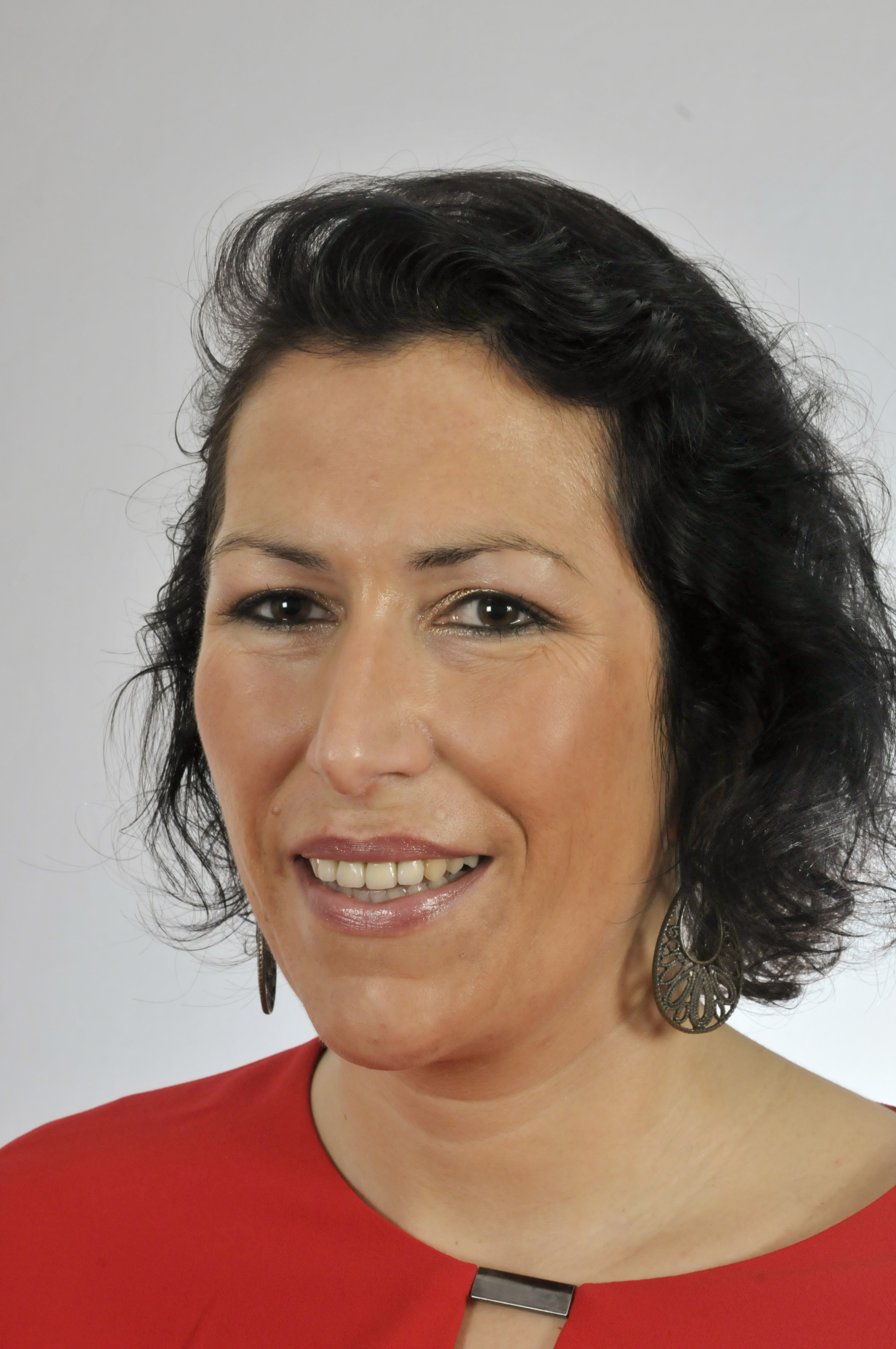
- Augustin in 2016

Member of the Landtag of Brandenburg
- Incumbent
- Assumed office 8 October 2014

Personal details
- Born: 6 February 1979 (age 47) Wriezen
- Party: Christian Democratic Union (since 1997)

Kristy Augustin (born 6 February 1979 in Wriezen) is a German politician serving as a member of the Landtag of Brandenburg since 2014. She has served as chairwoman of the women's wing of the Christian Democratic Union in Brandenburg since 2015.
