= Wriezen =

- Town
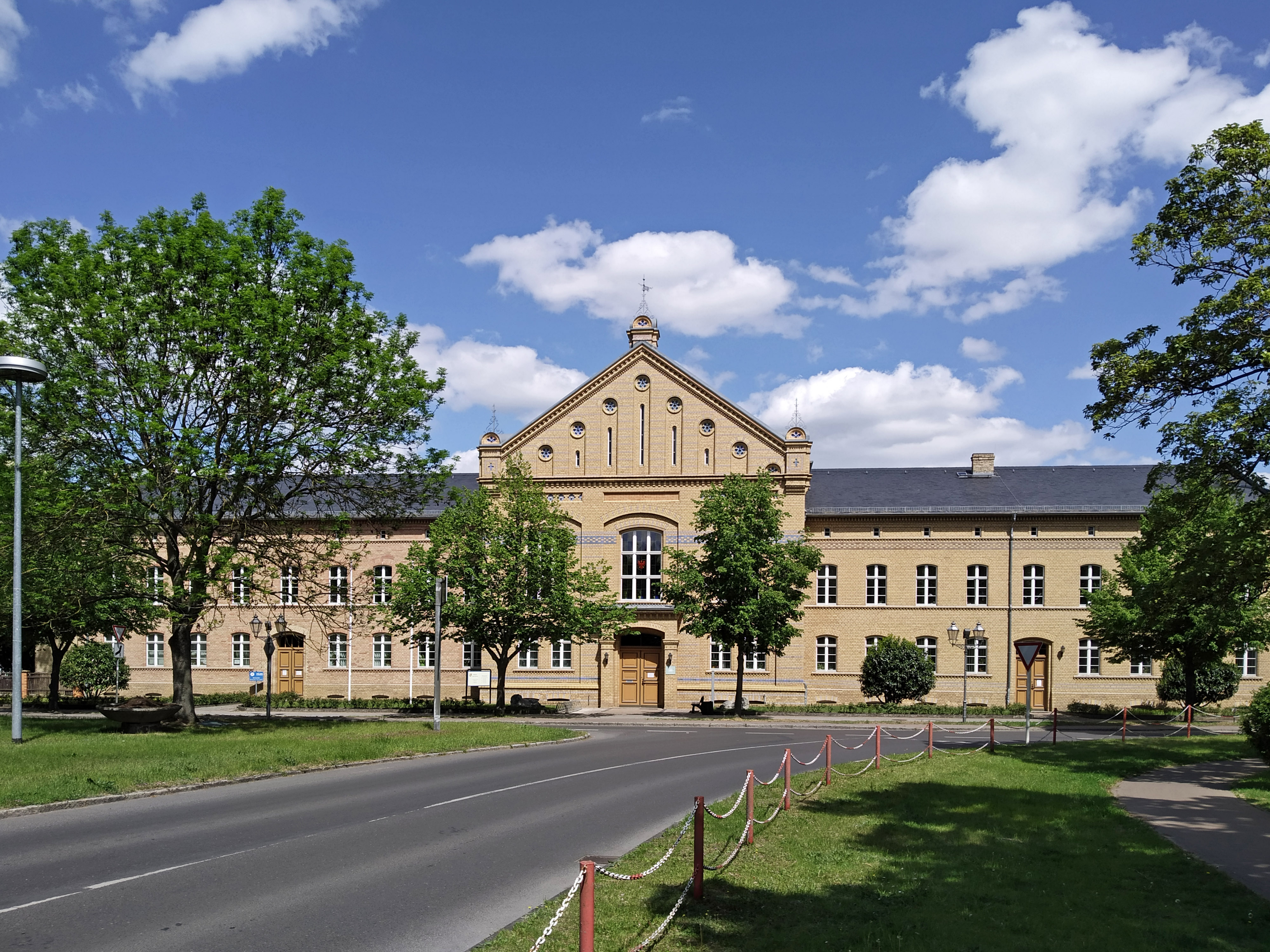
- Town hall

- Coat of arms

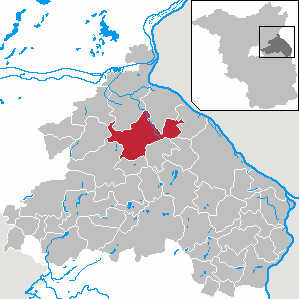
- Location of Wriezen within Märkisch-Oderland district
- Interactive map of Wriezen
- Location within Germany Location within Brandenburg
- Coordinates: 52°43′00″N 14°07′59″E
- Country: Germany
- State: Brandenburg
- District: Märkisch-Oderland
- Subdivisions: 4 Ortsteile

Government
  - Mayor (2017–25): Karsten Ilm (CDU)

Area
  - Total: 95.14 km^{2} (36.73 sq mi)
- Elevation: 10 m (33 ft)

Population (2025-12-31)
  - Total: 7,024
  - Density: 73.83/km^{2} (191.2/sq mi)
- Time zone: UTC+01:00 (CET)
  - Summer (DST): UTC+02:00 (CEST)
- Postal codes: 16269
- Dialling codes: 033456
- Vehicle registration: MOL
- Website: www.wriezen.de

Wriezen (German pronunciation: [ˈvʁiːtsn̩]) is a town in the district Märkisch-Oderland, in Brandenburg, in north-eastern Germany, near the border with Poland. It is situated 11 km (7 mi) southeast of Bad Freienwalde.

== Etymology ==
The name is of medieval Slavic Lechitic origin, and comes from the words we and rice or rika (modern Polish: rzeka, Lower Sorbian: rěka), which means "on the river". The modern Polish name is Wrzecień.

== History ==
From 1373 to 1411, it was part of the Bohemian (Czech) Crown under the House of Luxembourg. In 1375, the town's privileges were confirmed on the condition, that the Bohemian Kings could build a fortress in the town without any obstacles.

From 1701, Wriezen was part of the Kingdom of Prussia, within which from 1815 it was administratively located in the Province of Brandenburg, from 1871 it was also part of the German Empire. In the final weeks of World War II, on 19 April 1945, the town was captured by Allied Soviet and Polish forces. From 1947 to 1952 of the State of Brandenburg, from 1952 to 1990 of the Bezirk Frankfurt of East Germany and since 1990 again of Brandenburg.

== Demography ==
Development of Population since 1875 within the Current Boundaries (Blue Line: Population; Dotted Line: Comparison to Population Development of Brandenburg state; Grey Background: Time of Nazi rule; Red Background: Time of Communist rule)

Recent Population Development and Projections (Population Development before Census 2011 (blue line); Recent Population Development according to the Census in Germany in 2011 (blue bordered line); Official projections for 2005-2030 (yellow line); for 2017-2030 (scarlet line); for 2020-2030 (green line)

Wriezen: Population development
within the current boundaries (2020)

Year	Pop.	±% p.a.
1875	11,738	—
1890	10,302	−0.87%
1910	10,467	+0.08%
1925	10,364	−0.07%
1939	10,509	+0.10%
1950	9,375	−1.03%
1964	8,486	−0.71%

Year	Pop.	±% p.a.
1971	9,168	+1.11%
1981	9,289	+0.13%
1985	9,564	+0.73%
1990	9,243	−0.68%
1995	8,629	−1.37%
2000	8,519	−0.26%
2005	8,109	−0.98%

Year	Pop.	±% p.a.
2010	7,679	−1.08%
2015	7,355	−0.86%
2016	7,331	−0.33%
2017	7,259	−0.98%
2018	7,254	−0.07%
2019	7,174	−1.10%
2020	7,125	−0.68%

== Photogallery ==
St. Mary’s Church

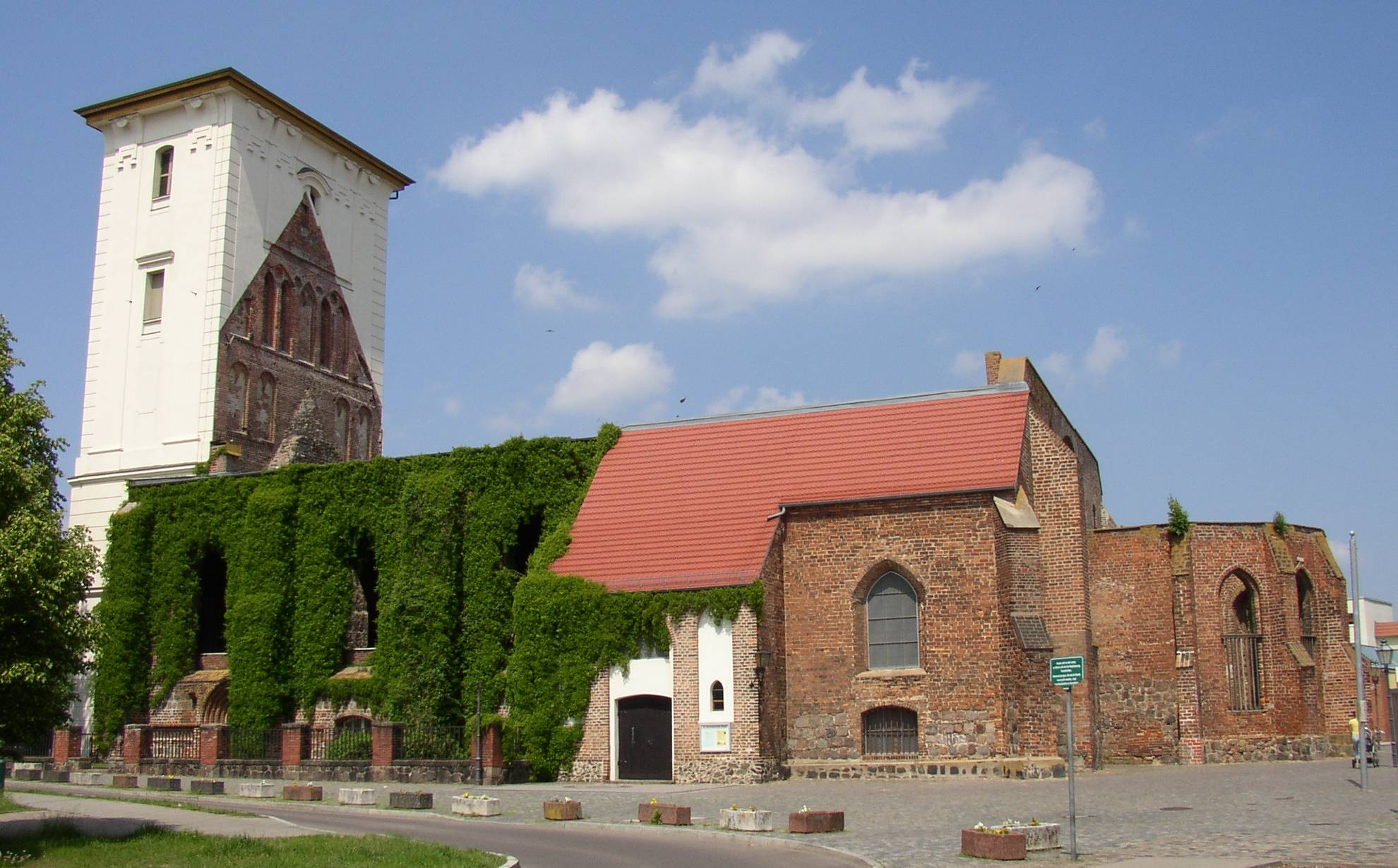

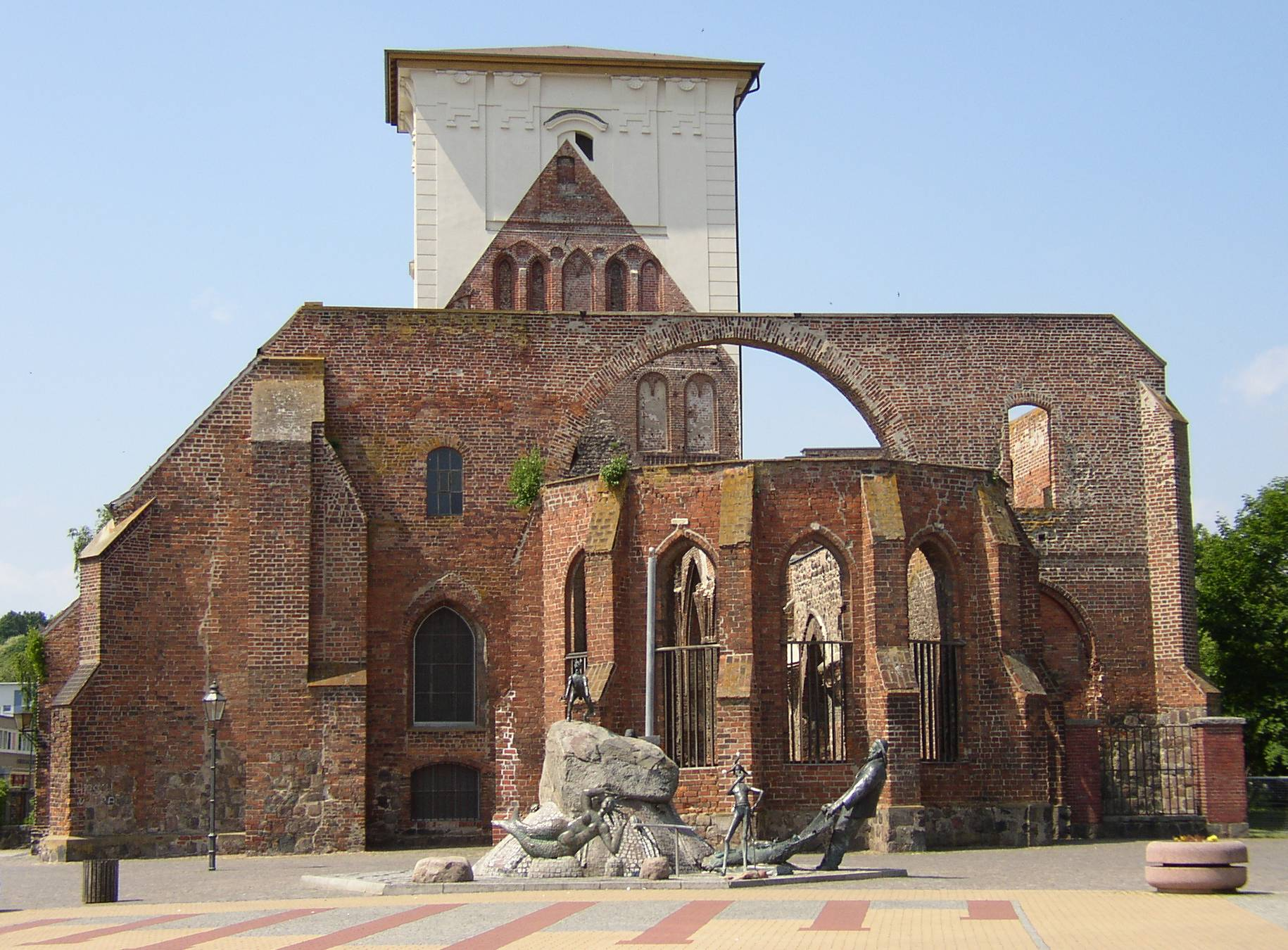
Haselberg

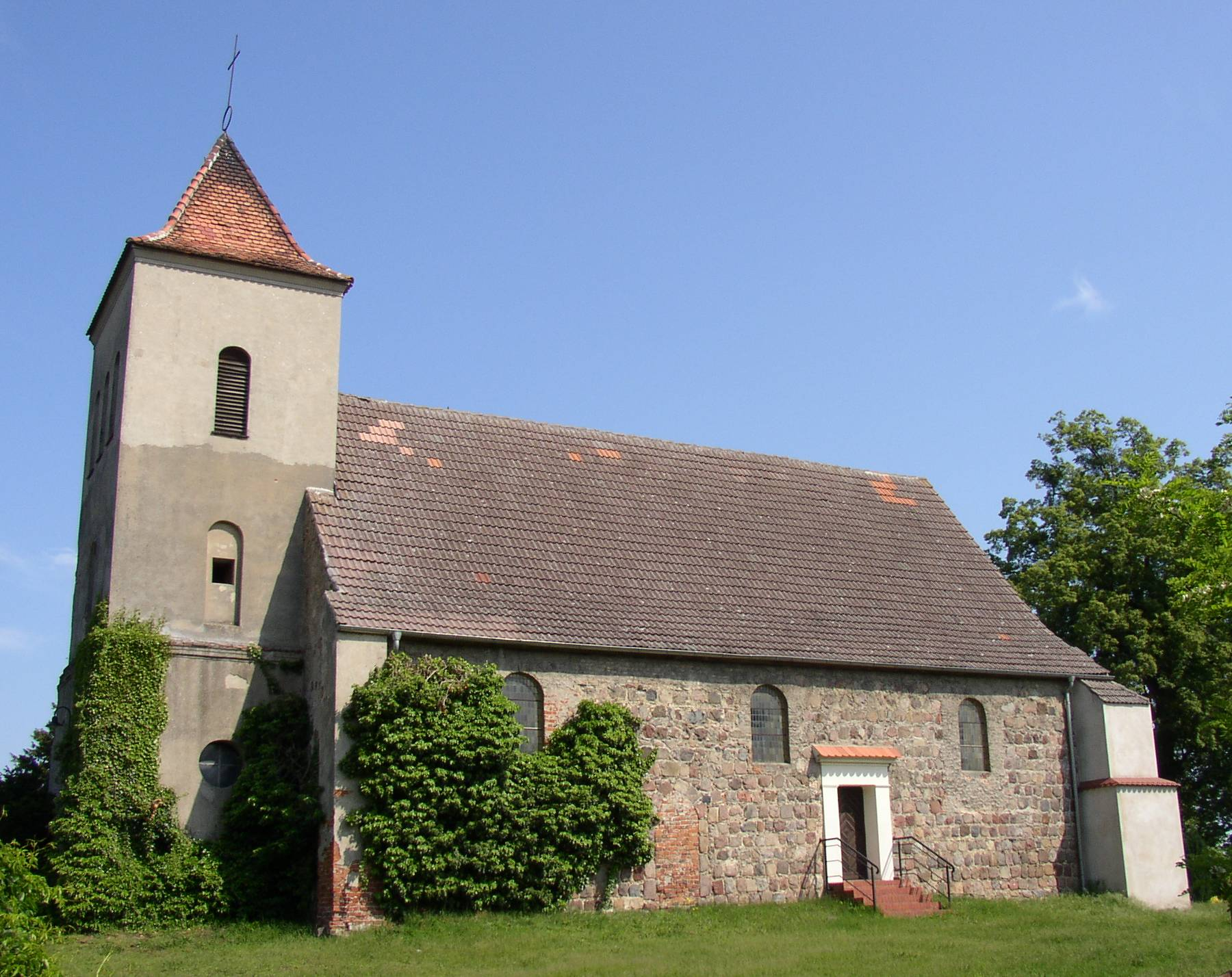
Church

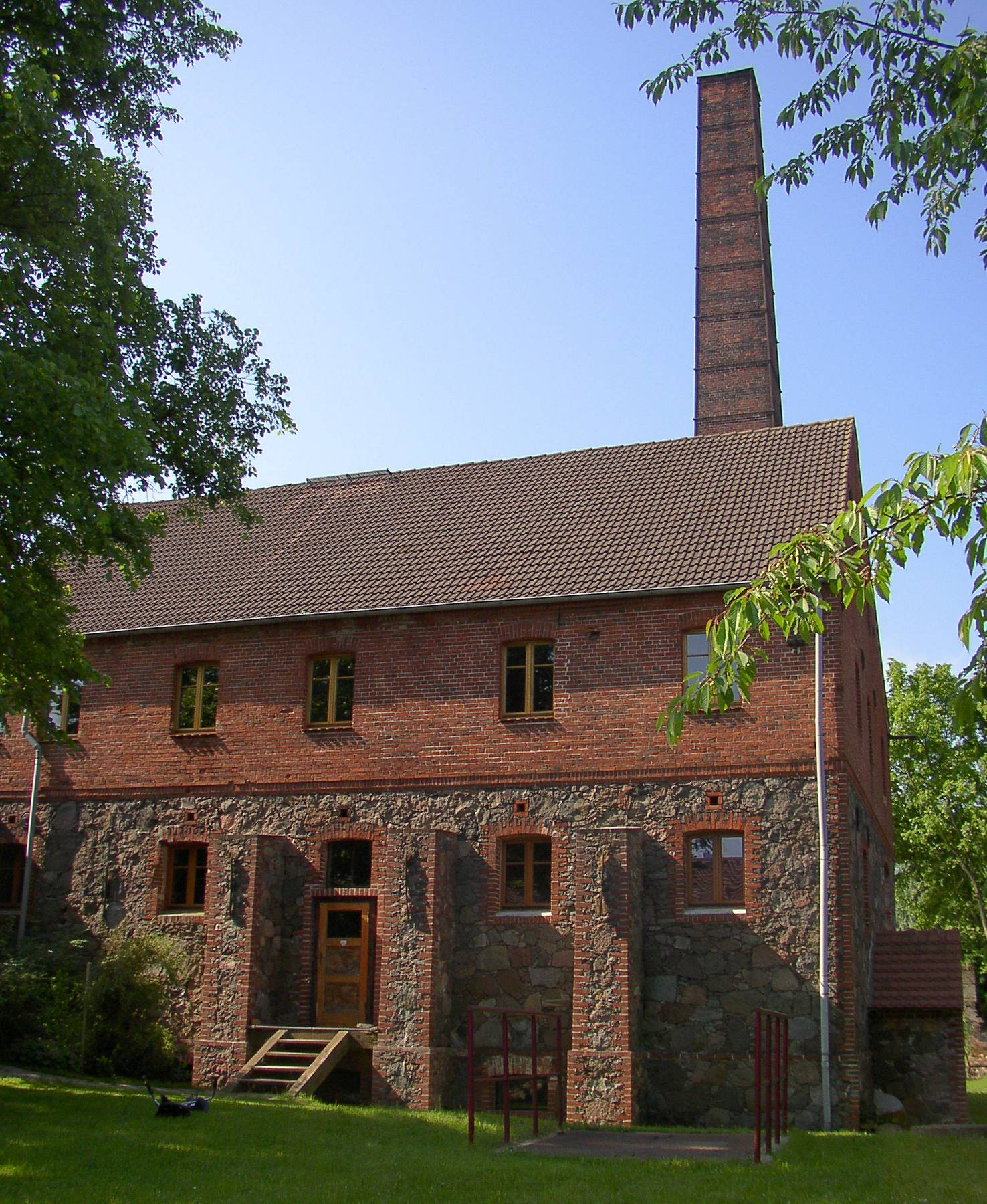
Distillery

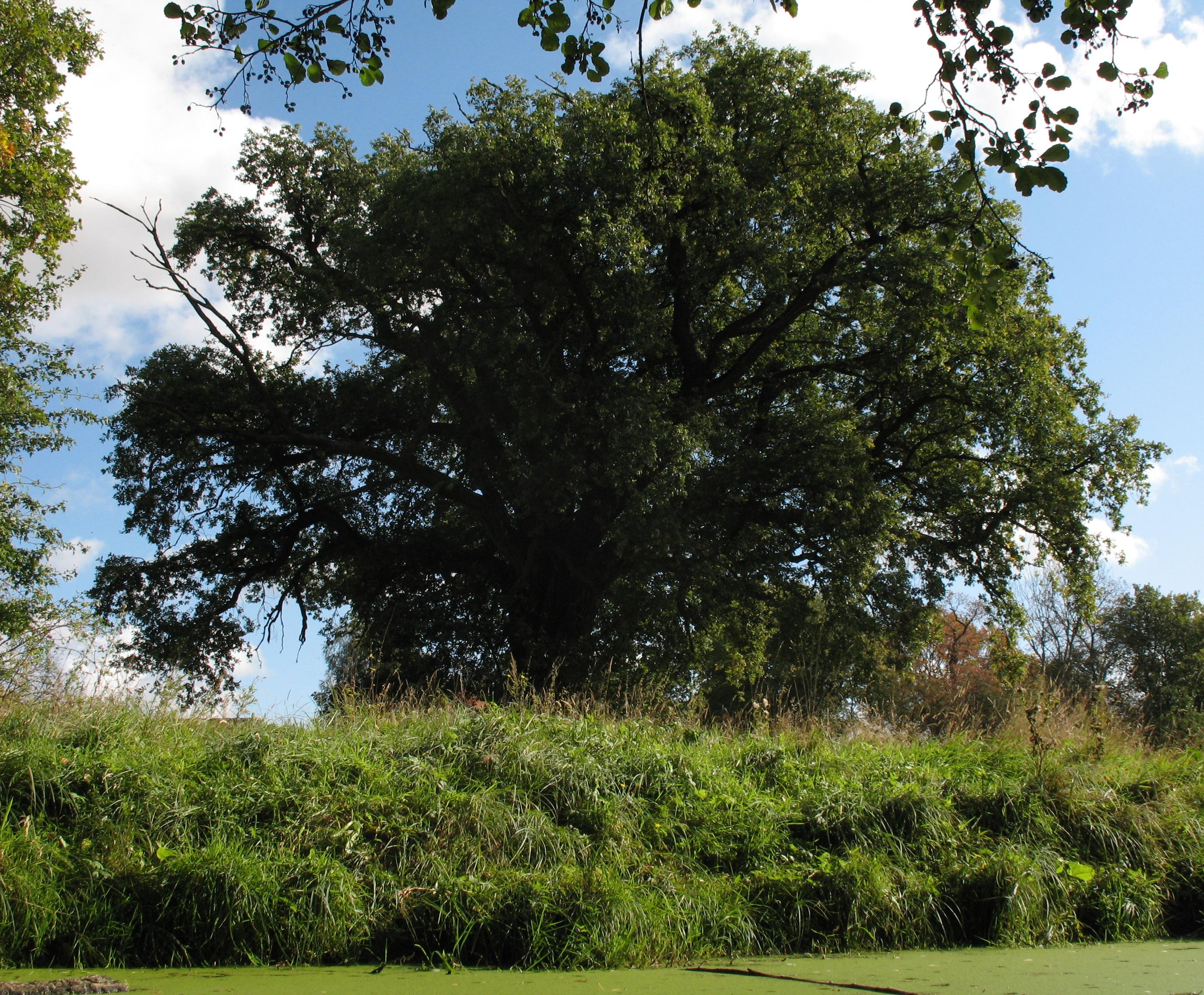
English oak

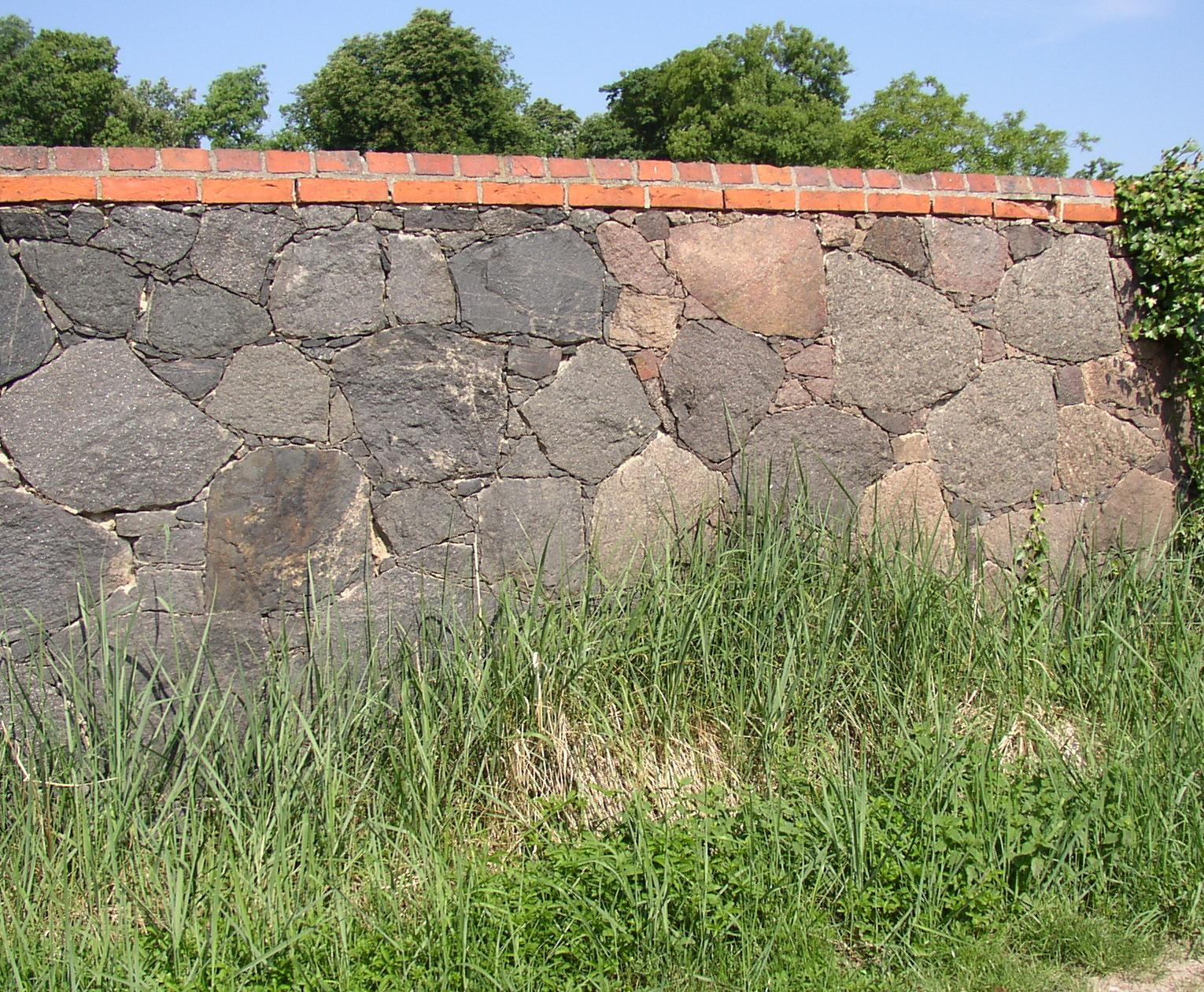
Fieldstone wall

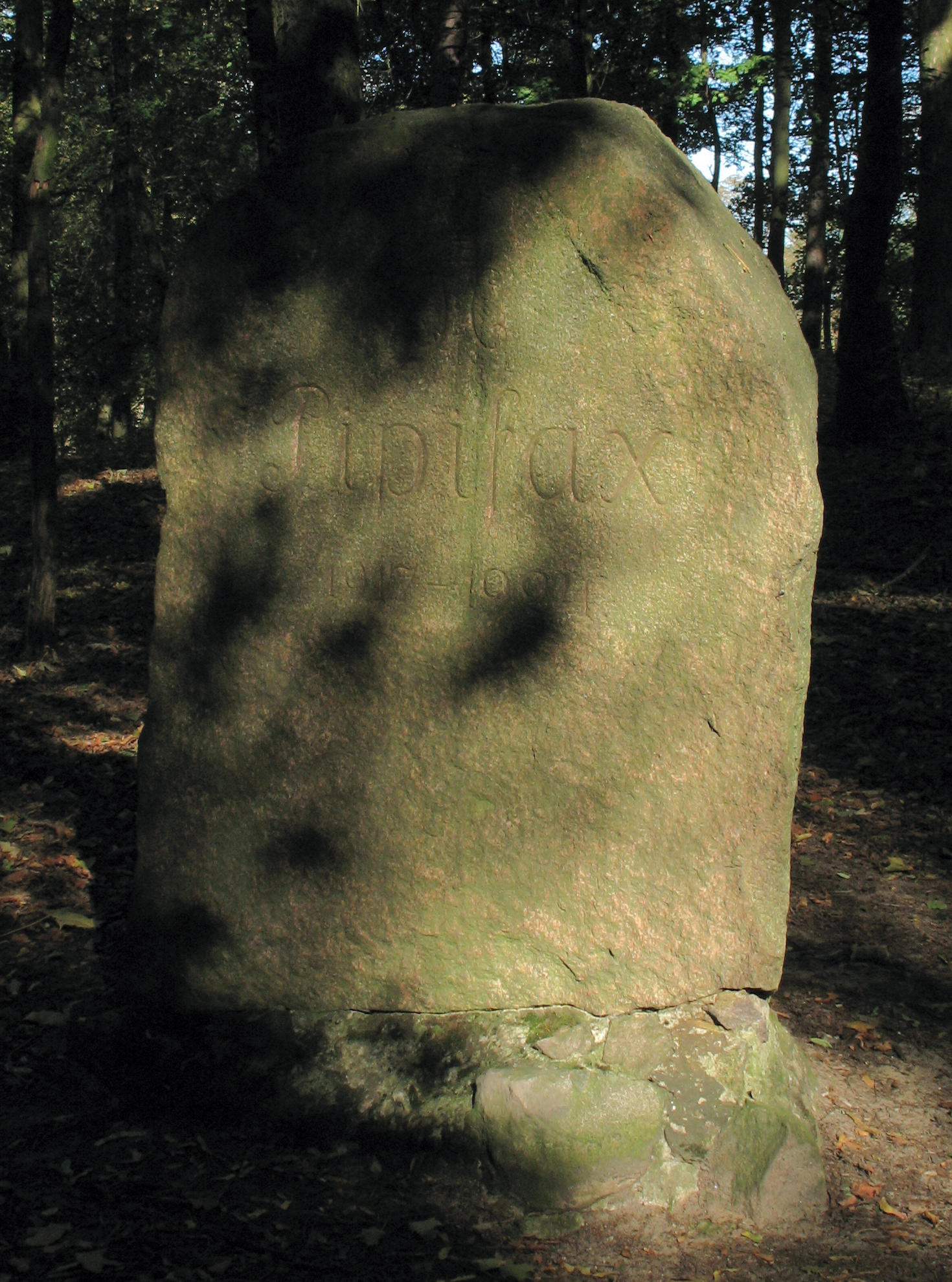
Grave of horse Pipifax

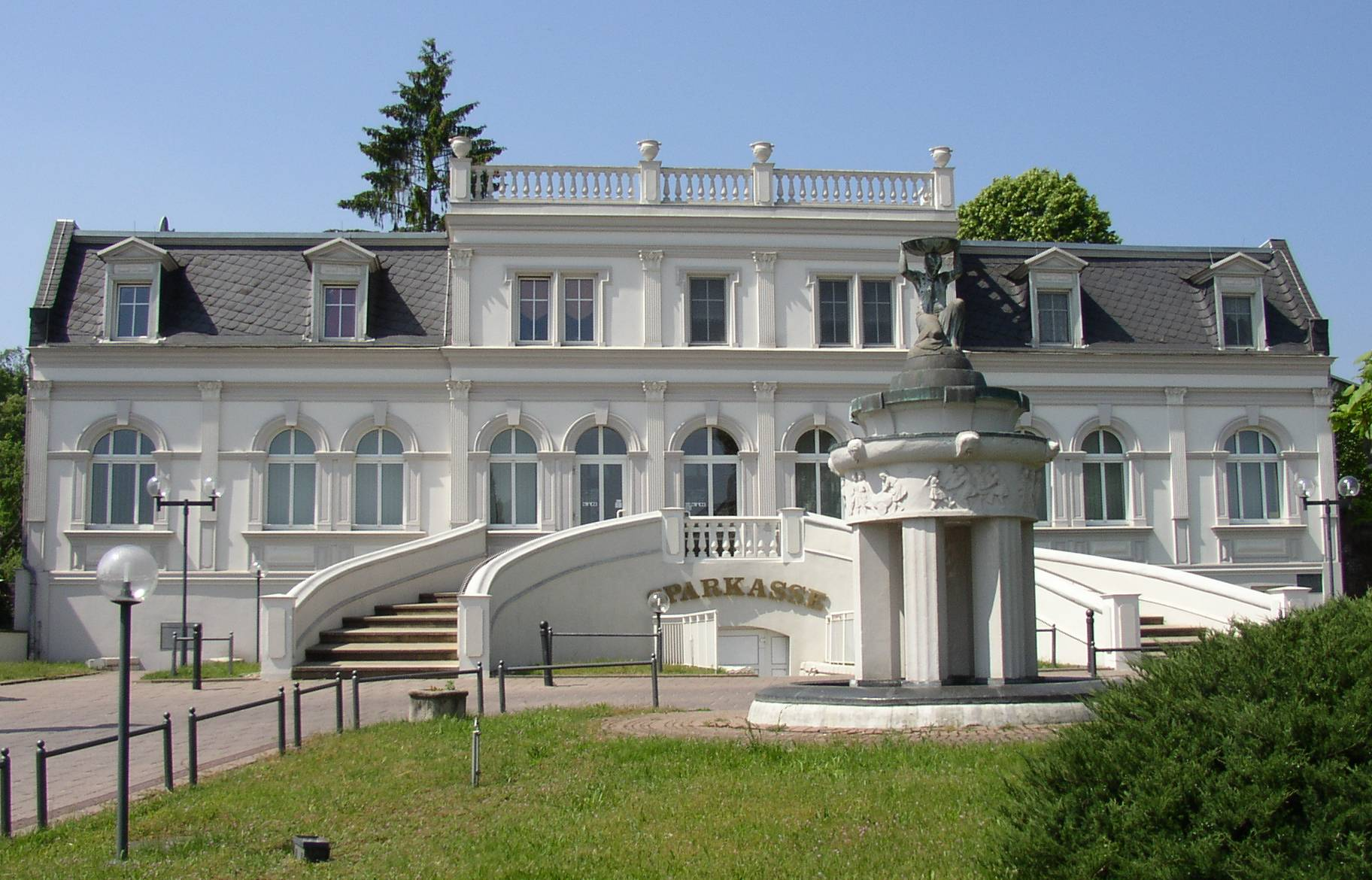
Sparkasse (Savings bank)

== Notable people ==
- Henning von Boehmer (born 1943), journalist and commercial lawyer, former general secretary of the International Chamber of Commerce - Germany (ICC)
- Cornelia Froboess (born 1943), actress, teen idol and pop singer
- Michael Succow (born 1941), biologist and agronomist, an honorary citizen of the municipality Lüdersdorf / Biesdorf, now district Wriezen
- Kristy Augustin (born 1979), German politician

== See also ==
- Berlin Wriezener Bahnhof
