= Beh (surname) =

- Language: German, Chinese (Southern Min), others

Origin
- Meaning: Chinese (馬): horse; Chinese (麥): wheat; Chinese (白): white; German: Bohemian

Other names
- Variant forms: Chinese (馬): Ma, Mar; Chinese (麥): Mai, Mak; Chinese (白): Bai, Bak; German: Boehm

Beh is a surname in various cultures. It may be a variant of the German surname Boehm, as well as a Southern Min spelling of three Chinese surnames Ma, Mai, and Bai.

== Origins ==
As a German surname, Beh may have originated as a variant of Boehm, which is a toponymic surname from Bohemia. It is also a spelling of Southern Min pronunciations of three Chinese surnames, listed in the table below. These spellings of the Chinese surnames are often found among Malaysian Chinese.

| Chinese characters | | Mandarin | Southern Min | | | | References |
| Chinese characters | | Mandarin | Hokkien | | Teochew | | References |
| Traditional | Simplified | Pinyin | Pe̍h-ōe-jī | IPA | Peng'im | IPA | References |
|---|---|---|---|---|---|---|---|
| 馬 | 马 | Mǎ | Bé, Bée | /be⁵³/, /bɛ⁵³/ | Bhê^{2} | /be⁵²/ | |
| 麥 | 麦 | Mài | Be̍h, Be̍eh | /beʔ²⁴/ | Bhêh^{8} | /beʔ⁴/ | |
| 白 | | Bái | Pe̍h | /peʔ²⁴/ | Bêh^{8} | /peʔ⁴/ | |

It is also a surname among the Krahn people of Liberia and the Ivory Coast.

== Statistics ==
According to statistics compiled by Patrick Hanks on the basis of the 2011 United Kingdom census and the Census of Ireland 2011, 74 people on the island of Great Britain and none on the island of Ireland bore the surname Beh in 2011. The 1881 United Kingdom census did not find anyone with this surname. The 2010 United States census found 513 people with the surname Beh, making it the 42,308th-most-common name overall. This represented an increase from 365 (53,191st-most-common) in the 2000 Census. In both censuses, slightly more than half of the bearers of the surname identified as non-Hispanic white, between 20% and 25% as Asian, and roughly 15% as Black.

== People ==
- Beh Gaik Lean (born c. 1953), Malaysian chef
- Beh Lee Wei (born 1983), Malaysian table tennis player
- Seraphina Beh (born 1994), British actress
