= Henning von Boehmer =

German author, publisher, lawyer and journalist

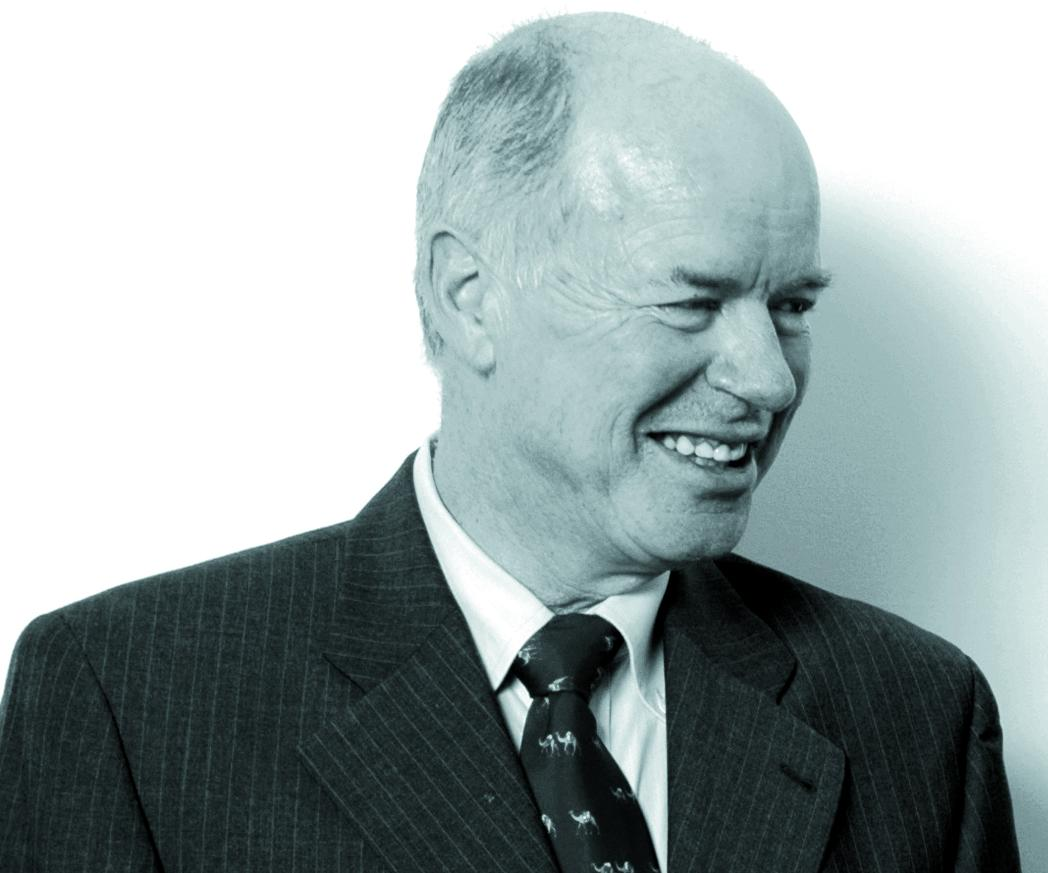
Henning von Boehmer

(Justus) Henning von Boehmer (born 16 August 1943 in Wriezen, Germany) is a German author, publisher, lawyer, and journalist in Germany, particularly Düsseldorf.

== Education ==
A native of Brandenburg, Boehmer studied law at the universities of Kiel and Bonn in Germany, Geneva in Switzerland, Lyon and Toulouse in France and finally at the New York University in the US. He earned a Dr. jur. degree from University of Bonn with his thesis on French Law and a LL.M. degree from New York University. He was admitted to the German bar as a Rechtsanwalt (attorney-at-law) and certified as a tax law specialist.

== Career ==
Boehmer held the position of Director (Legal and Personnel) at several companies in the German and British construction industry from 1973 to 1980. Afterwards, he was Executive Director at the Wirtschaftsrat der CDU e.V. (Economic Council of the Christian Democratic Union) in Bonn and from 1982 to 1995 he served as Secretary General of the International Chamber of Commerce (ICC) in Cologne. Since 1996, Boehmer has worked as a senior counsel for several international law firms.

Boehmer was Chairman of the Board of DTB Stillhalter SICAV, a Luxembourg Futures and Options Fund promoted by Sal. Oppenheim jr. & Cie. Banking Group. He is co-founder of the "Deutsch-Amerikanische Juristenvereinigung e.V." (US-German Association of Jurists), member of the "Deutsch-Französischer Kreis e.V." (French-German Society), member of the "Industrie Club Düsseldorf e.V", and was a member of the Advisory Committee at the "Zentrale zur Bekämpfung unlauteren Wettbewerbs e.V." (Center against Unfair Competition). He is also a lifetime member of the General Society of Mayflower Descendants in the US and co-founder of the Jerusalem Foundation Deutschland e.V.

Boehmer has published several books and written numerous articles in leading German newspapers (Handelsblatt, Die Welt, Welt am Sonntag) on international economic policy and on various forms of national and international financial investment.

== Family ==
Boehmer is descended from the Prussian Boehmer family, a long dynasty of law scholars and lawyers going back to the late 16th century, ennobled in the 18th century as "von Boehmer". Among his ancestors are Justus Henning Boehmer (1674−1749), professor of law and director at the University of Halle (Saale), and probably the most important expert on Protestant ecclesiastical law of the 17th/18th century, and Johann Samuel Friedrich von Boehmer (1704−1772), professor of law and director at the University of Frankfurt-on-the-Oder and a leading criminal law expert of the 18th century. His uncle Hasso von Boehmer (1904−1945) was a Lieutenant Colonel in the General Staff of the German Army and took part in the assassination attempt against Adolf Hitler by Claus von Stauffenberg on 20 July 1944. Hasso von Boehmer was executed by the Nazi regime in 1945 in Berlin following imprisonment at Ploetzensee Prison.

Boehmer's father, Thilo von Boehmer (1911−1997), was inter alia Chairman of the Board of "Gebr. Poensgen AG" in Düsseldorf. He was married to Brigitte Poensgen (1922−1986), daughter of Düsseldorf entrepreneur Helmuth Poensgen (1887−1945), member of the board of "Vereinigte Stahlwerke AG" and descendant of the Rhenish industrialist family Poensgen. His maternal great-grandfather, Bodo Borries von Ditfurth (1852−1915), was a soldier who was seconded by the German Emperor Wilhelm II to the Ottoman Empire and served for ten years in Constantinople under Sultan Abdul Hamid II as an Ottoman General ("Pascha").

== Bibliography ==
- The Retention of Title and other Means of Security for Debts under German and French Law (German), Dissertation (Dr. Jur.). Bonn University Library, 1970, DNB 482,032,693
- Discharge of Employees under German and US Law (English). Thesis (LL.M.). New York University Library, 1971
- West German anti-trust (Cartel) Law (English). Verlag Informationen für die Wirtschaft GmbH, Bonn, 1981, ISBN 3-922335-05-5
- German companies doing business in the United States (German). Schäffer Poeschel Verlag, Stuttgart, 1988, ISBN 3-8202-0454-7, DNB 890 102 147
- German companies doing business in the Arab Gulf States (German). Schäffer Poeschel Verlag, Stuttgart, 1990, ISBN 3-8202-0596-9, DNB 901 335 304
- German companies doing business in France (German). Schäffer Poeschel Verlag, Stuttgart, 1991, ISBN 3-8202-0654-X, DNB 911 205 144
- German companies doing business in Italy (German). Schäffer Poeschel Verlag, Stuttgart, 1993, ISBN 3-8202-0692-2, DNB 921 104 839
