= Böhme =

Böhme (transliterated Boehme) may refer to:

- Böhme (surname), a surname (including a list of people with that name)
- Böhme (river), in Lower Saxony, Germany
- Böhme, Lower Saxony, a municipality in Lower Saxony, Germany
- Boehme's giant day gecko (Phelsuma madagascariensis boehmei)
- Böhme's gecko (Tarentola boehmei)

== See also ==
- Bohm (disambiguation)
- Böhm (disambiguation)
- Boehm, a surname (including a list of people with that name)
- Böhmer, a surname (including a list of people with that name)
