= Georg Böhme =

German politician (1926–2016)

Member of the Bundestag
- In office 17 October 1961 – 17 October 1965

Personal details
- Born: 16 March 1926 Hildesheim
- Died: 1 July 2016 (aged 90) Hildesheim, Lower Saxony, Germany
- Party: CDU

Georg Böhme (March 16, 1926 – July 1, 2016) was a German politician of the Christian Democratic Union (CDU) and former member of the German Bundestag.

== Life ==
Böhme joined the CDU in 1951. At the same time, he joined the Junge Union (JU) and had been chairman of the JU district association of Hildesheim since 1953. In 1958, he was elected deputy regional chairman of the Hannover JU.

Böhme was a member of the German Bundestag from 1961 to 1965. He was elected to parliament via the Lower Saxony state list.

== Literature ==
Herbst, Ludolf; Jahn, Bruno (2002). Vierhaus, Rudolf (ed.). Biographisches Handbuch der Mitglieder des Deutschen Bundestages. 1949–2002 [Biographical Handbook of the Members of the German Bundestag. 1949–2002] (in German). München: De Gruyter - De Gruyter Saur. p. 1715. ISBN 978-3-11-184511-1.
