= Philipp Adolf Böhmer =

Prussian physician and professor

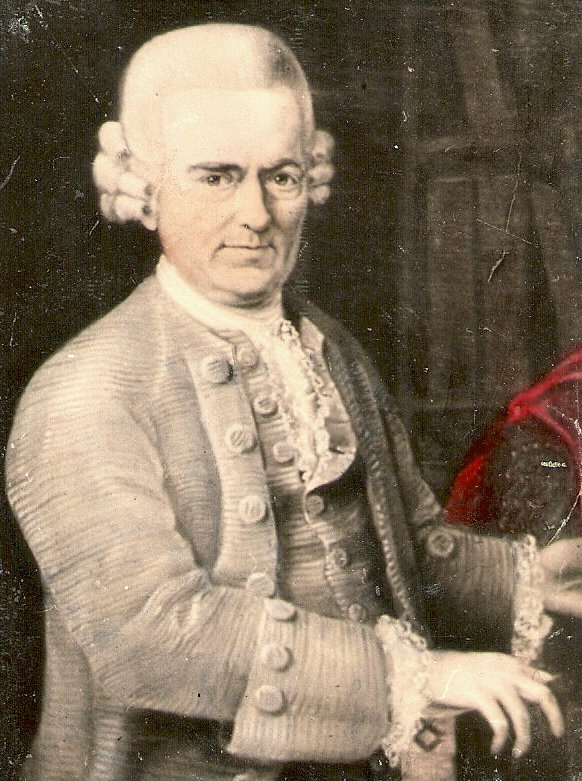
- Born: August 26, 1711
- Occupations: Physician, academic

Philipp Adolph Böhmer (26 August 1711 – 30 October 1789) was a Prussian physician and professor of medicine at the University of Halle. He was a personal physician to King Friedrich William II of Prussia.

Böhmer was born in Halle in a landed family of well-known lawyers and his father Justus Henning Böhmer was a jurist married to Eleonore Rosine Stützing (1679-1739). He studied medicine under Friedrich Hoffmann and Johann Heinrich Schulze at the University of Halle, receiving a doctorate in 1738 after which he went to study in Paris under Grégoire the Younger and practiced for a while in Strasbourg. He returned to Germany in 1739, serving as physician in Eislebeneas and in the court of Saxe-Weimar. He became chair of the anatomy department at the University of Halle, replacing Johann Friedrich Cassebohm in 1741. He wrote a few books including a translation of Richard Manningham's compendium of obstetrics (1746) and a treatise De usu et praestantia forcipis anglicanae describing fenestrated forceps.

Böhmer married Johanna Dorothea (1718–1761) daughter of Johann Christoph Naumann, and they had four children. In 1786, he married Maria Sophie Caroline von Brandenstein (1739–1789), divorced from Count Friedrich Wilhelm von Wartensleben (1728–1798) which may have helped his appointment as personal physician to King Friedrich William II in 1787. He inherited the family home on 5 Große Märkerstraße. He is buried at the Halle's Stadtgottesacker (arch 78).
