= Robert Böhme =

German footballer

Personal information
- Full name: Robert Böhme
- Date of birth: 10 October 1981 (age 45)
- Place of birth: East Germany
- Height: 1.82 m (6 ft 0 in)
- Position: Winger

Team information
- Current team: Thüringen Weida

Youth career
- 1987–2000: Dynamo Dresden

Senior career*
Years	Team	Apps	(Gls)
2000–2002	Dynamo Dresden	3	(0)
2000–2002	→ FV Dresden-Nord (loan)		
2002–2003	SV Wacker Burghausen	3	(0)
2003–2005	FC Carl Zeiss Jena	22	(3)
2005–2010	VFC Plauen	135	(11)
2010–2015	ZFC Meuselwitz	123	(1)
2015–	Thüringen Weida	0	(0)
- * Club domestic league appearances and goals as of 7 June 2015

Robert Böhme (born 10 October 1981) is a German footballer who plays for Thüringen Weida.
