= Kingdom of Westphalia =

Client state of the French Empire (1807–1813)

Coordinates: 51°18′36″N 09°30′00″E

Kingdom of Westphalia Royaume de Westphalie (French) Königreich Westphalen (German)
- 1807–1813
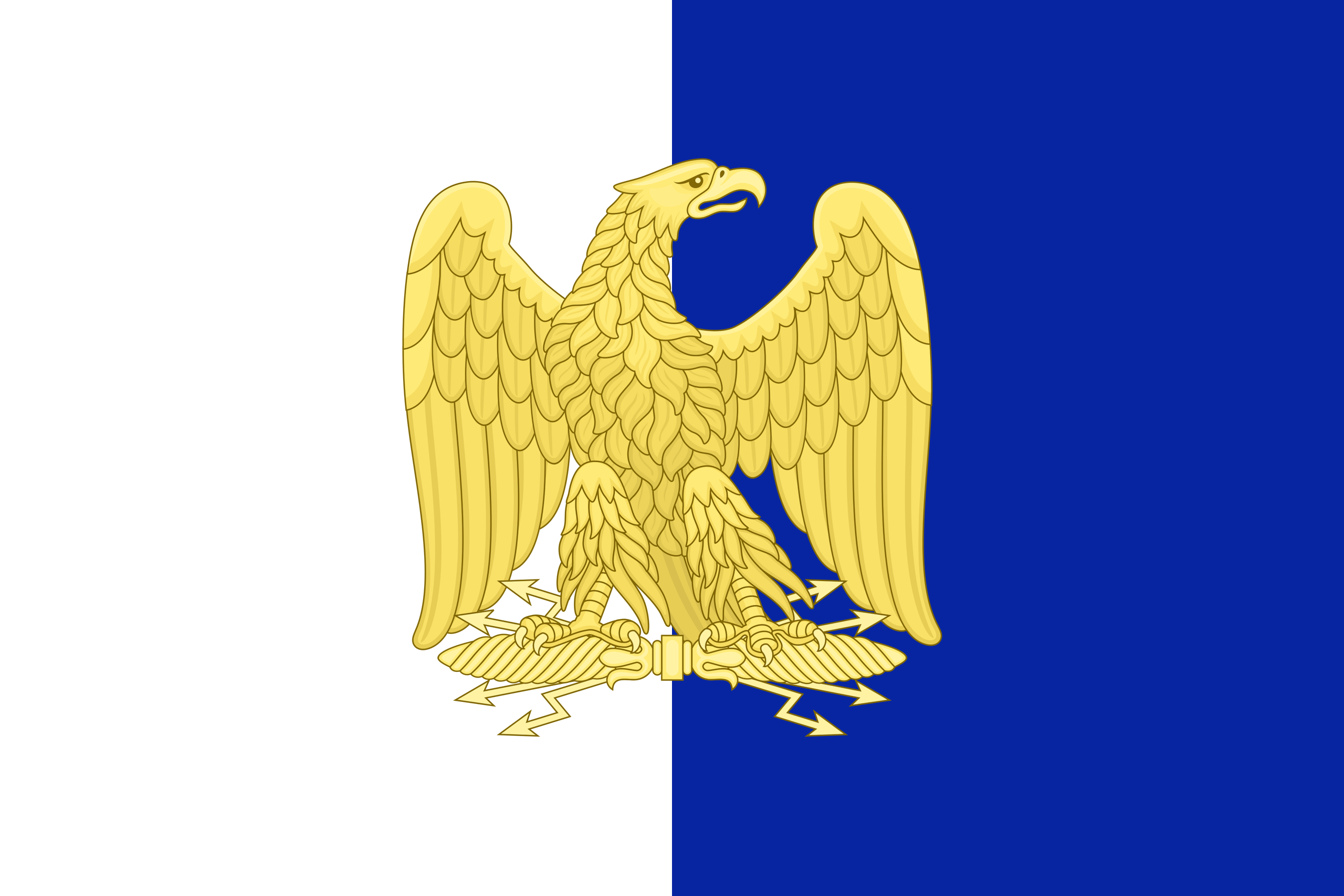
- Top: National flag Bottom: Royal standard Coat of arms

- The Kingdom of Westphalia in 1812
- Status: Client state of the French Empire
- Capital: Cassel
- Common languages: German; French (administrative)
- Religion: Catholicism; Lutheranism; Calvinism; Judaism (minority)
- Government: Constitutional monarchy
- King
  - 1807–1813: Jerome Napoleon I
- Prime Minister
  - 1807–1813: Joseph Jérôme Siméon
- Legislature: Imperial Estate
- Historical era: Napoleonic era
  - Treaty of Tilsit: 7 July 1807
  - Constitution adopted: 7 December 1807
  - Battle of Leipzig: 19 October 1813

Area
- 1809: 37,883 km^{2} (14,627 sq mi)
- 1810: 63,652 km^{2} (24,576 sq mi)
- 1812: 45,427 km^{2} (17,539 sq mi)

Population
  - 1809: 1,950,724
  - 1810: 2,600,000
  - 1812: 2,065,970
- Currency: Westphalian frank
Preceded by
Electorate of Hanover
Electorate of Hesse
Principality of Brunswick-Wolfenbüttel
Succeeded by
Kingdom of Hanover
Electorate of Hesse
Kingdom of Prussia
Principality of Brunswick-Wolfenbüttel
- Today part of: Germany

The Kingdom of Westphalia was a client state of France in present-day Germany that existed from 1807 to 1813. While formally independent, it was ruled by Napoleon's brother Jérôme Bonaparte. It was named after Westphalia, but this was a misnomer since the kingdom had little territory in common with that area. The region mostly covered territory formerly known as Eastphalia.

Napoleon imposed the first written modern constitution in Germany, a French-style central administration, and agricultural reform. The kingdom liberated the serfs and gave everyone equal rights and the right to a jury trial. In 1808 the kingdom passed Germany's first laws granting Jews equal rights, thereby providing a model for reform in the other German states. Westphalia seemed to be progressive in immediately enacting and enforcing the new reforms.

The country was relatively poor but Napoleon demanded heavy taxes and payments and conscripted soldiers. Few of the men who marched into Russia with Napoleon in 1812 returned. The kingdom was bankrupt by 1812. When Napoleon was retreating in the face of Allied advances in 1813, the kingdom was overrun by the Allies and (in 1815) most of its territories became Prussian. Most of the reforms, however, remained in place.

== Formation ==
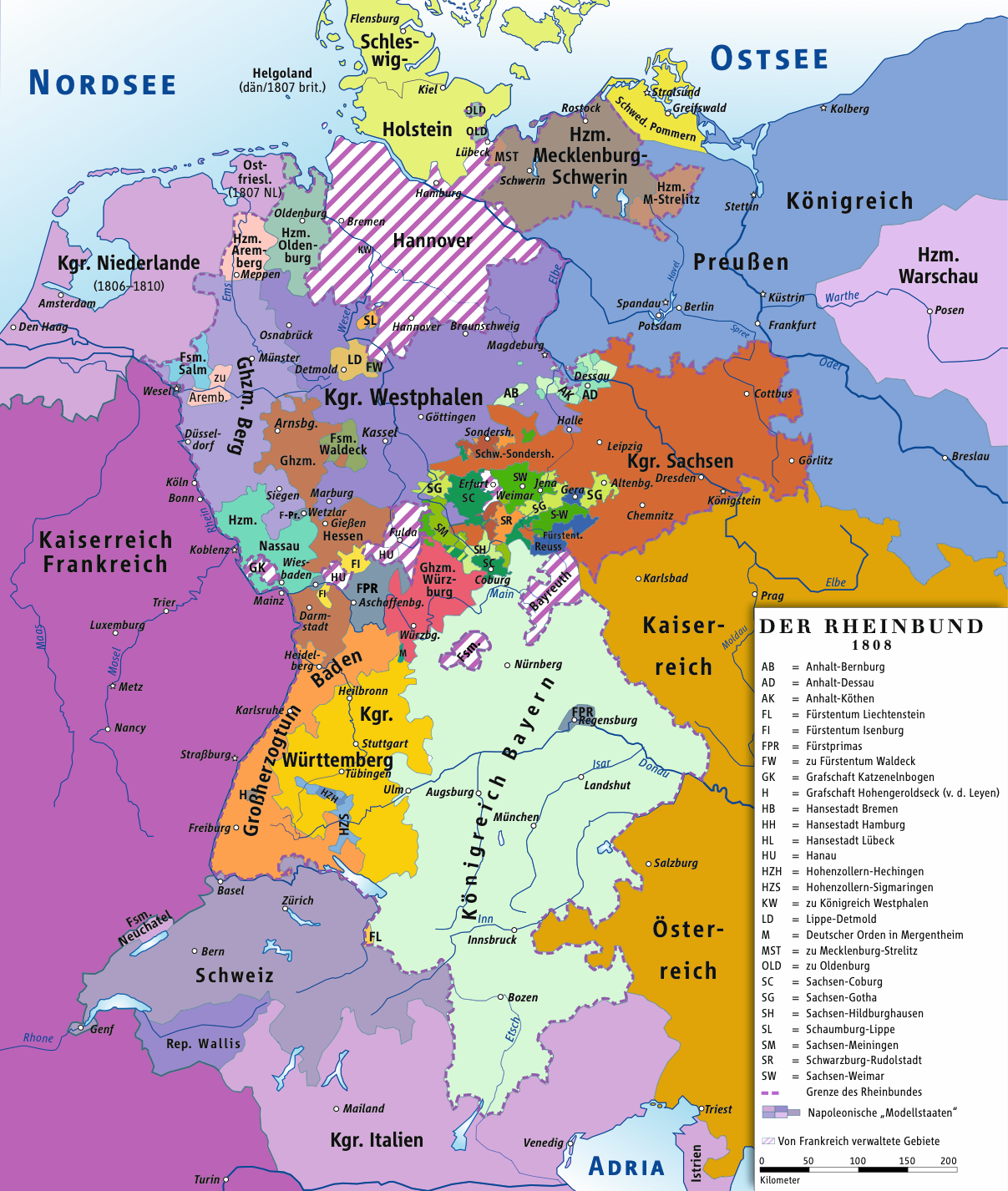
Location of the Kingdom of Westphalia within the Confederation of the Rhine in 1808

The Kingdom of Westphalia was created by Napoleon in 1807 by merging territories ceded by the Kingdom of Prussia in the Peace of Tilsit (including the Altmark, the part of the Duchy of Magdeburg west of the Elbe river, Paderborn, Hildesheim), the territories of Hanover, Brunswick-Wolfenbüttel, and the Electorate of Hesse. Hesse's capital Cassel (modern spelling Kassel) then fulfilled the same function for Westphalia, and the king kept his court at the palace of Wilhelmshöhe, renamed Napoleonshöhe. The state was a member of the Confederation of the Rhine.Napoleon chose to make his brother Jérôme the king of Westphalia.

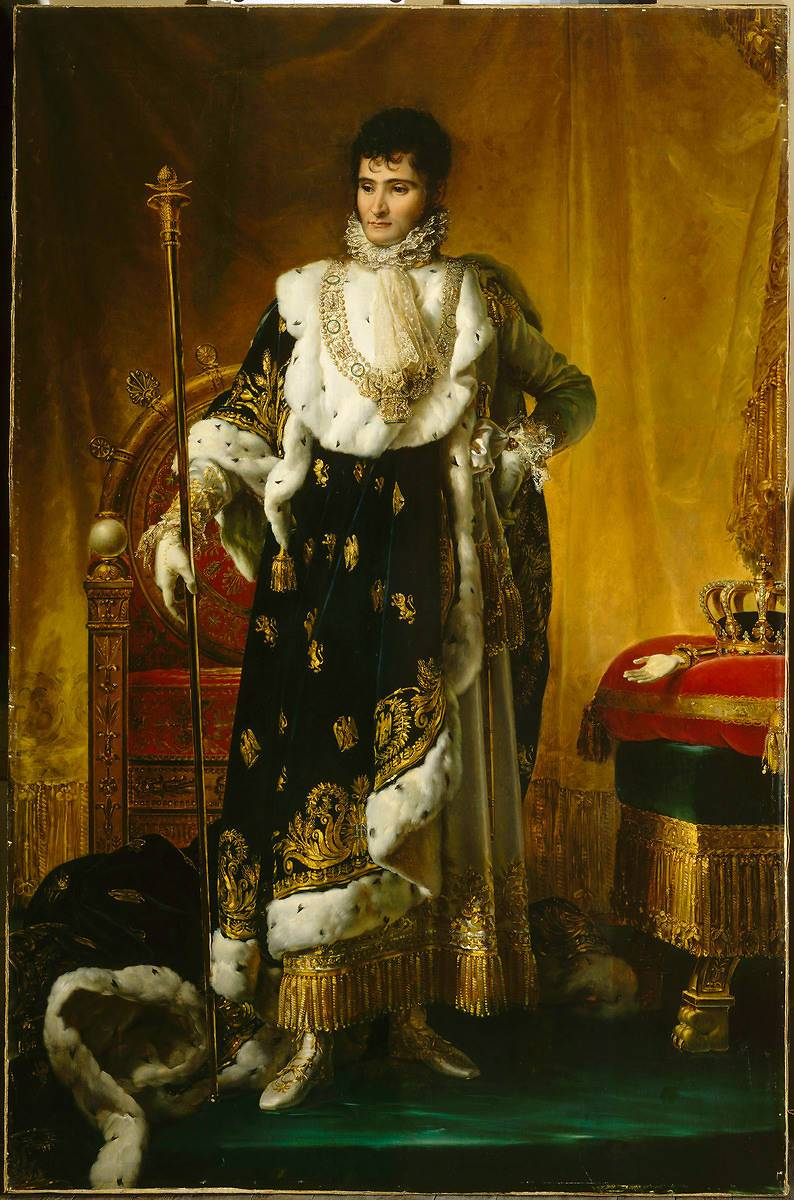
King Jérôme in royal robes as king of Westphalia

Intended as a model Napoleonic state, a constitution was promulgated on 15 November 1807 and enacted by King Jérôme on 7 December 1807 shortly after his arrival in Cassel. The constitution has often been regarded as the first modern-style constitution in a German monarchy. It granted equality before the law to male citizens, abolished serfdom, emancipated Jewish subjects, and ended many feudal obligations.

The Napoleonic Code was introduced, eliminating guild restrictions and facilitating the development of a more liberal economic order. Administrative reforms included the introduction of the metric system of weights and measures and the rationalization of state institutions according to French models.

== Territory ==
On its creation, the Kingdom of Westphalia comprised the following territories:

- The Electorate of Hesse-Cassel, with Schaumburg, excluding Hanau, Schmalkalden and Catzenellnbogen;
- The principalities of Brunswick-Wolfenbüttel, Hildesheim, Halberstadt, Quedlinbourg, Osnabrück, Paderborn and Minden;
- The counties of Mansfeld, Stolberg, Ravensberg, Rietberg and Hohnstein;
- The cities of Halle, Goslar, Mühlhausen and Nordhausen;
- The parts of the Altmark and the Duchy of Magdeburg west of the Elbe;
- The Eichsfeld with Treffurt;
- The principalities of Göttingen and Grubenhagen, with the enclaves of Hohnstein and Elbingerode.

The new state was divided into departments, districts, and communes, similarly to France. Departments received names based on watercourses (Elbe, Saale, Weser, Fulda, Leine, Oker) and mountains (Harz), regardless of their traditional names. These departments were generally composed of territories taken from a number of petty states. Compared to the departments of France itself, the Westphalian departments were relatively small and sparsely populated.

While administrative divisions (departments, districts and cantons) were certainly less unequal than the previous territorial divisions, uniformity does not appear to have been a determining factor in their creation. The desire to break from the past, and not just from the random territorial divisions of the former manorial justices, especially influenced the cantonal distribution. In December 1810, the short-lived coastal and northern départements Nord ("North", capital Stade) and Niederelbe ("Lower Elbe", capital Lüneburg) were ceded to the French Empire.

=== Departments ===
Departments of the Kingdom of Westphalia in 1811

Department	Capital	Dates	Population (1807)
Elbe	Magdeburg	1807-1813	252,507
Fulda	Cassel	1807-1813	254,845
Harz	Heiligenstadt	1807-1813	202,891
Leine	Göttingen	1807-1813	144,350
Oker	Brunswick	1807-1813	270,486
Saale	Halberstadt	1807-1813	240,195
Werra	Marburg	1807-1813	255,237
Weser	Osnabrück	1807-1810	330,213
Aller	Hanover	1810-1813	N/A

== Jews ==
Following the French example, Jewish congregations in the Kingdom of Westphalia were reorganised under a central administrative body, and a Royal Westphalian Consistory of the Israelites was established to supervise Jewish religious life. The Brunswick-Wolfenbüttel court financier and reformer Israel Jacobson was appointed president of the consistory, assisted by a governing board. Jacobson sought to promote religious reform among Jewish communities in the kingdom. He established a house of prayer in Cassel in which elements of liturgical reform were introduced, building upon earlier reforms he had initiated at Seesen.

== Downfall ==
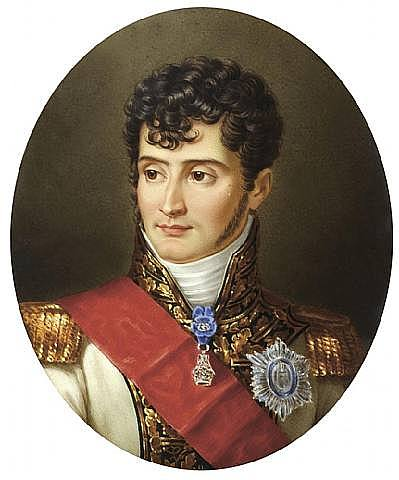
Portrait of Jérôme in military uniform

A significant burden on the kingdom was the requirement to supply troops and financial support for the Napoleonic Wars. A Westphalian contingent took part in the Russian campaign of 1812. King Jérôme initially had a key role as the commander of the right wing for the invasion, but was reprimanded by Napoleon for his poor performance at the Battle of Smolensk, so he abandoned his command and returned to Westphalia. By the end of the campaign, his troops had been practically wiped out: out of the initial 25,000 soldiers and 800 officers of the Kingdom of Westphalia, only 600 and 18 returned, with 600 others defecting to Russia. In January 1813, revolts against conscription broke out in Düsseldorf and Hanau. Nevertheless, Jérôme managed to raise 27,000 men for the German campaign of 1813, one of the highest mobilisation rates in Europe, and the Westphalian troops fought steadfastly on the French side until the end of the campaign.

In September 1813, Russian general Alexander Chernyshyov led a raid on Cassel with 1,200 to 2,300 regular cavalrymen and Cossacks, along with four to six artillery pieces. He captured the city by surprise on the night of 28 to 29 September, causing Jérôme and his staff to flee; however, Chernyshyov, lacking the infantry to hold Cassel, evacuated the city with prisoners and loot. The French retook Cassel on 7 October. Prussian troops occupied Westphalia on 26 October, following the French defeat at the Battle of Leipzig on 19 October. The kingdom was then dissolved and the status quo of 1806 was restored, except for the counties of Rietberg and Stolberg-Wernigerode, which were annexed by Prussia.

== Coat of arms ==
The Coat of Arms of Westphalia

The arms reflect the incorporated territories. The first quarter shows the silver horse of Westphalia; the second the lion of Hesse over the counties of Dietz, Nidda, Ziegenhain and Katzenelnbogen; the third was newly designed for non-specified territories around Magdeburg; and the fourth combined Brunswick, Diepholz, Lüneburg and Lauterburg.Around the shield are the Order of the Crown of Westphalia and the French Grand Aigle of the Légion d'honneur. Above is Napoleon's star. Typical of Napoleonic heraldry are the crossed sceptres.

== Flag ==
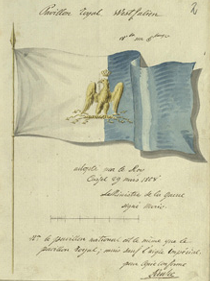
Peter Joseph Krahe's draft design of the Westphalia royal standard in 1808.

In 1808, court architect Peter Joseph Krahe produced a design for a flag to be flown at the ducal palace in Braunschweig that depicts a white–blue field with royal emblems, offering contemporary evidence that Westphalia used white and blue as state colours—at least for official building display. The draft describes the flag as being identical to the royal flag, but without the imperial eagle.

== See also ==
- Duchy of Westphalia
- Province of Westphalia
- Karl Keller, prominent court musician of the Kingdom of Westphalia
