= Böhm =

Böhm is a German surname literally meaning "Bohemian/Czech" in German. It may refer to:

- Andrea Böhm (born 1961), German journalist
- Annett Böhm (born 1980), German judoka
- Carl Crack (born Carl Böhm), German techno artist
- Corbinian Böhm (born 1966), German artist
- Corrado Böhm (1923–2017), Italian computer scientist
- Daniel Böhm (born 1986), German biathlete
- Eduard von Böhm-Ermolli, Austrian general of World War I
- Eugen von Böhm-Bawerk (1851–1914), Austrian economist
- Franz Böhm (1895–1977), German politician and jurist
- Franz Böhm (director) (born 1999), British-German film director and producer
- Georg Böhm (1661-1733) German Baroque composer and organist
- Gottfried Böhm (1920–2021), German architect
- Hans Böhm (Drummer of Niklashausen), shepherd, drummer and preacher
- Johann Böhm (disambiguation), several people
- Johannes Böhm (1890–1957), German politician
- Joseph Böhm (1795–1876), Austrian violinist and teacher
- Joseph Edgar Böhm (1834–1890), sculptor
- Karl Böhm (1894–1981), Austrian conductor
- Karl Leopold Böhm (1806–1859), Austrian cellist
- Karlheinz Böhm (1928–2014), Austrian actor
- Katharina Böhm (born 1964), Austrian actress and daughter of Karlheinz Böhm
- Siegfried Böhm (1928–1980), East German politician
- Theobald Böhm (1794–1881), German inventor and musician
- Werner Böhm (1941–2020), German musician and singer
- Wilfried Böhm (born 1934), German politician

== See also ==
- Boehm system, Theobald Böhm's fingering system for flute
- Boehm
- Bohm (disambiguation)
- Böhme (disambiguation)
- Böhmer
