= Johann Böhm =

Johann Böhm may refer to:

- Johann Böhm (chemist) (1895−1952), German Bohemian chemist
- Johann Böhm (historian) (1929–2024), Romanian-born German scholar
- Johann Böhm (German politician) (born 1937), former president of the Bavarian Landtag
- Johann Böhm (Austrian politician) (1886–1959), Austrian Minister of Social Affairs
