= Constitution of the Kingdom of Westphalia =

First constitution in Germany, adopted 1807

The Constitution of the Kingdom of Westphalia was the oldest constitution in Germany, adopted by the Kingdom of Westphalia on November 15, 1807. It was drafted based on the French Constitution of 1804 and served as a model for the constitutions of other states in the Confederation of the Rhine, the Napoleonic union of German states (e.g. the Grand Duchy of Frankfurt). The Constitution was adopted by royal decree on December 7, 1807 and published in the law bulletin.

== Content ==
The Constitution outlines the integration of the Kingdom into the Napoleonic regime as a part of the Confederation of the Rhine (Art. 5). The appointed king was Jérôme I, brother of Napoleon I (Art. 6 et seq.). The metric system was also instituted (Art. 17), as was the Napoleonic Code (Art. 45 et seq.).

The text consists of thirteen titles and a preamble. The first title establishes the territory of the Kingdom. The second title deals with the Confederation of the Rhine, while the third title deals with the king. The fourth title aims at reforming society and state e.g. by granting equality of all subjects before the law (Art. 10), reducing the privileges of the nobility (Art. 12), and abolishing serfdom (Art. 13). The fifth title establishes the departments, and the sixth title establishes the Council of State as institutions of the executive. The government comprised four ministers, each of which headed an individual department (Art. 19, 20). Additionally, a State Council consisting of 16 to 25 people was created (Art. 21 et seq.). The Imperial Estates within the Kingdom of Westphalia, the Kingdom's Parliament, and its committees also participate in the legislative process (Art. 25 ff.).

Title seven regulates the estates of the realm, which the king could convene for legislative purposes (Art. 29 et seq.). Titles eight to ten lay down the administrative structure of the kingdom, title eleven deals with the judiciary, title twelve mandates conscription, and the last title is dedicated to the process of amending the constitution.

== Implementation of the Constitution ==
Most constitutional institutions began to function during the course of 1808. However, the institutions were partly at odds with their framer's (Napoleon's) intended social reforms. On multiple occasion the estates of the realm, in which the landed nobility exherted a strong influence, blocked the government's reform laws. The Departmental Colleges, which were tasked with electing the judges of the peace for the Cantons and proposing candidates for the municipal councils to the king, were another constitutional body dominated by the formerly privileged nobility.

In order to implement reforms despite the nobility's resistance, the Westphalian Government started to bypass some constitutional organs from 1810 onwards, such that the Imperial Estates were not convened anymore, the king started to rule by decree, and the Departmental-Colleges were not consulted anymore after the first round of appointments in 1808. When Westphalia annexed territories of the former Electorate of Hanover in 1810, it excluded the electoral colleges entirely from the selection processes for the region. However, the royal government ensured that the rights of municipal councils, which were the lowest representative bodies subordinate to the administrative officials.
