= Magnus von Behm =

Russian commander

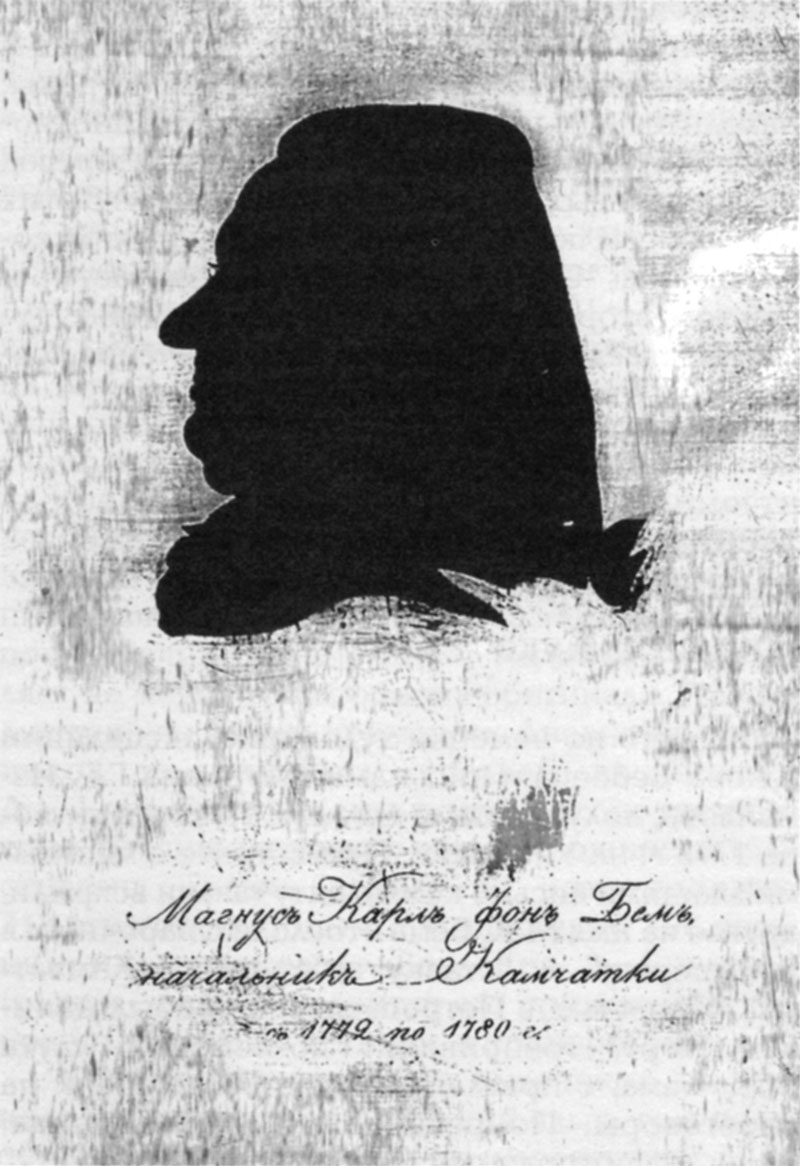
Magnus von Behm

Magnus von Behm (27 March 1727, in Livonia – 9 July 1806, in Riga) was the chief commander of Kamchatka in Russia from 1773 to 1779. With his wife Eva von Borning, they had four children: Maria, Eva, Peter and Charlotte Christina.

After James Cook's death in Hawaii, the surviving commander, Charles Clerke, sailed to Kamchatka, and entrusted Cook's logbook to Behm, who saw that it was safely delivered to England, along with a cover letter describing Cooks death. The letter was how England learned the news of Cook's death since - though it arrived eleven months after Cook's death - it arrived before the ships returned.
