= Peter M. Boehm =

US Army Civil War Medal of Honor recipient (1845–1914)

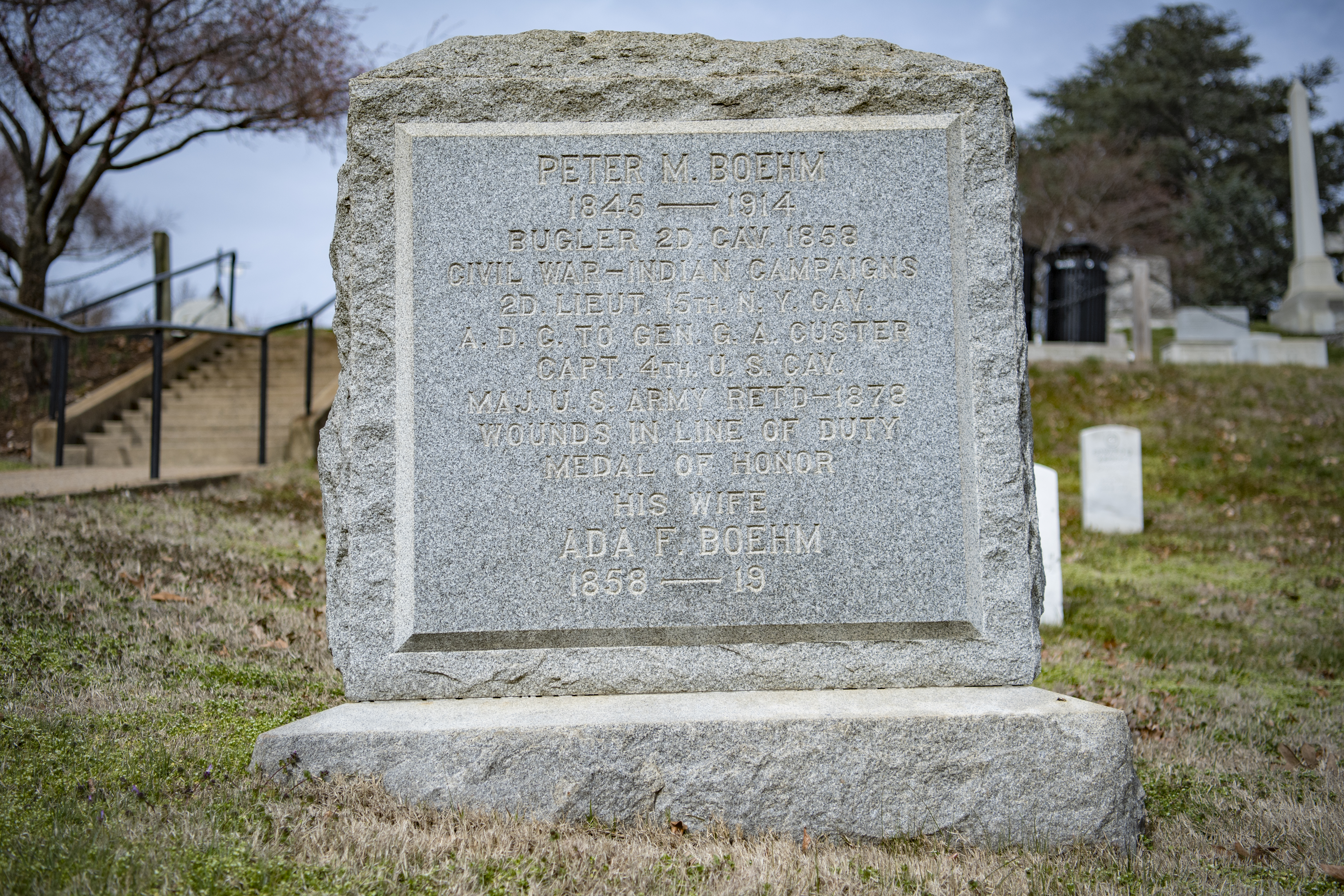
- Grave at Arlington National Cemetery
- Born: February 10, 1845; New York, US
- Died: June 14, 1914 (aged 69)
- Burial place: Arlington National Cemetery
- Military career
- Allegiance: United States of America
- Branch: United States Army
- Service years: 1858–1865, 1866–1878
- Rank: Major
- Unit: (New York (state)) 15th Regiment New York Volunteer Cavalry - Company K
- Conflicts: Battle of Dinwiddie Court House
- Awards: Medal of Honor

Peter Martin Boehm (February 10, 1845 – June 14, 1914) was an American soldier who fought in the American Civil War. Boehm received the country's highest award for bravery during combat, the Medal of Honor, for his action during the Battle of Dinwiddie Court House in Virginia on 31 March 1865. He was honored with the award on 15 December 1898.

== Biography ==
Boehm was born in New York, and joined the Army in July 1858. He served with the 2nd US Cavalry until transferring to the 15th New York. He was promoted to second lieutenant in the 15th New York Cavalry in March 1865. It was during this time that he performed the act of gallantry that would earn him the Medal of Honor. On 31 March 1865 Boehm, as aide-de-camp to General Custer, was involved in the Battle of Dinwiddie Court House in Virginia. On seeing a line of men being forced back by the enemy's assault, Boehm took the flag from the color bearer and mustered the line of men into action, eventually beating back the enemy's assault.

Boehm was also involved in the Indian Wars. He was breveted Captain on 27 February 1890 after displaying another act of bravery on the Brazos River in Texas in October of the previous year.

Boehm retired from active service in March 1878 and was presented with the Medal of Honor twenty years later. He died in 1914 and he was buried at Arlington National Cemetery, in Arlington, Virginia.

== Medal of Honor citation ==
While acting as aide to General Custer, took a flag from the hands of color bearer, rode in front of a line that was being driven back and, under a heavy fire, rallied the men, re-formed the line, and repulsed the charge.

== See also ==
- List of American Civil War Medal of Honor recipients: A–F
