= Georgianna Behm =

American politician

Member of the Washington House of Representatives
- In office 1943–1945

Personal details
- Born: 1905 Minnesota
- Died: unknown
- Party: Democratic

Georgianna Behm (1905 – unknown) was an American politician who was a member of the Washington state House of Representatives for the Democratic Party from 1943 to 1945.
