= Günter Böhme (politician, born 1925) =

German politician

Member of the Bundestag
- In office 20 October 1969 – 22 September 1972

Personal details
- Born: 21 November 1925 Leverkusen
- Died: 2006 (aged 80–81)
- Party: CDU

Günter Böhme (M 16, 1913 – M 24, 1988) was a German politician of the Christian Democratic Union (CDU) and former member of the German Bundestag.

== Life ==
From 1969 to 1972 he was a member of the German Bundestag. He was elected via the state list of the CDU North Rhine-Westphalia.

== Literature ==
Herbst, Ludolf; Jahn, Bruno (2002). Vierhaus, Rudolf (ed.). Biographisches Handbuch der Mitglieder des Deutschen Bundestages. 1949–2002 [Biographical Handbook of the Members of the German Bundestag. 1949–2002] (in German). München: De Gruyter - De Gruyter Saur. p. 1715. ISBN 978-3-11-184511-1.
