= Boehme's giant day gecko =

Scientific classification
- Kingdom: Animalia
- Phylum: Chordata
- Class: Reptilia
- Order: Squamata
- Suborder: Gekkota
- Family: Gekkonidae
- Genus: Phelsuma
- Species: P. madagascariensis
- Subspecies: P. m. boehmei

Trinomial name
- Phelsuma madagascariensis boehmei Meier, 1982

Subspecies of lizard

Boehme's giant day gecko (Phelsuma madagascariensis boehmei) is a diurnal species of gecko, a lizard in the family Gekkonidae. The species is endemic to eastern Madagascar and typically inhabits rainforests and dwells on trees. Boehme's giant day gecko feeds on insects and nectar.

== Etymology ==
Both the specific name, boehmei, and the common name, Boehme's giant day gecko, are in honor of German herpetologist Wolfgang Böhme.

== Description ==
P. m. boehmei is among the largest living day geckos. It can reach a total length of about 22 cm (8.7 in). The body colour is bright green. The skin between the scales has a black colour. A dark red-coloured stripe extends from the nostril to behind the eye. On the head and back there are irregularly shaped brownish or red-brick-coloured dots.

== Geographic range ==
Boehme's giant day gecko only inhabits the region around Andasibe and Ranomafana in eastern Madagascar.

== Habitat ==
P. m. boehmei is a rainforest species and is often found on trees high in the canopy. The east coast of Madagascar has a humid and warm climate. However, from June–August, the night temperature can be as low as 10 °C (50 °F) and around 20–25 °C (68–77 °F) during the day.

== Diet ==
Boehme's giant day gecko feeds on various insects and other invertebrates. It also likes to lick soft, sweet fruit, pollen and nectar.

== Behaviour ==
P. m. boehmei is apparently not as quarrelsome as other members of the genus Phelsuma.

== Reproduction ==
The pairing season of Boehme's giant day gecko is between November and January. During this period, the females lay up to 6 pairs of eggs. At a temperature of 28 °C (82 °F), the young will hatch after approximately 48–55 days. The hatchlings measure 60–65 mm (2.4–2.6 in).

== Care and maintenance in captivity ==
P. m. boehmei should be housed in pairs, and needs a large, well planted terrarium. The humidity should be maintained between 75 and 100%. It is often suggested (McKeown, 1993; Henkel & Schmidt, 1995) that the daytime temperature should be between 25 and 28 °C (77 and 82 °F) between November and January. These authors also suggest that between July and August, the daytime temperature should be 25 °C (77 °F) while dropping it to 15 °C (59 °F) at night. This way one simulates the rainforest environment. However, the period between July and August corresponds with the warmest months on the northern hemisphere so active cooling might be necessary. For some breeders it therefore may be more adequate to shift this essential drop in temperature to the colder months (November–January) and the higher temperature to the months April–August. In captivity, P. m. boehmei can be fed with crickets, wax moths, fruit flies, mealworms, and houseflies.
