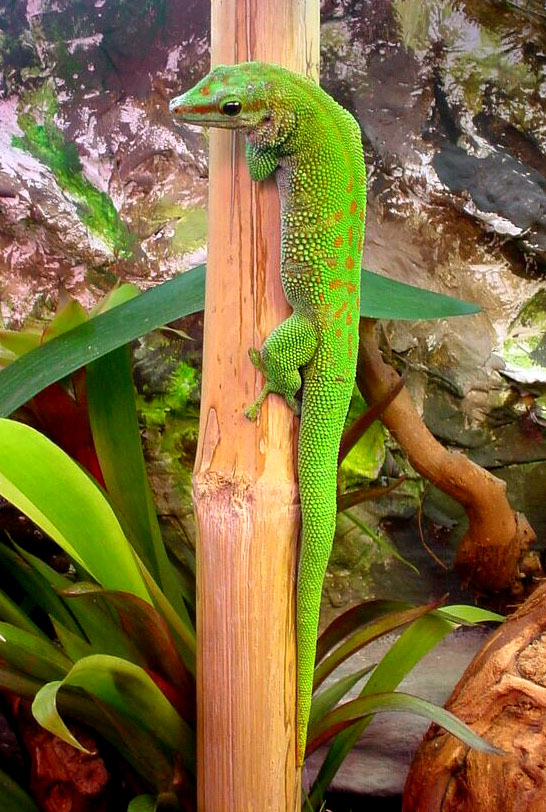
- Madagascar day gecko (Phelsuma madagascariensis madagascariensis)

Scientific classification
- Kingdom: Animalia
- Phylum: Chordata
- Class: Reptilia
- Order: Squamata
- Suborder: Gekkota
- Family: Gekkonidae
- Genus: Phelsuma
- Species: P. madagascariensis
- Subspecies: P. m. madagascariensis

Trinomial name
- Phelsuma madagascariensis madagascariensis Gray, 1831

= Madagascar day gecko =

Madagascar Day Gecko

Subspecies of lizard

The Madagascar day gecko (Phelsuma madagascariensis madagascariensis) is a diurnal species of gecko. It lives on the eastern coast of Madagascar and typically inhabits rainforests and dwells on trees. The Madagascar day gecko feeds on insects, fruit and nectar. They also breed once seasonally in the summer months of the southern hemisphere.

== Scientific synonyms ==
- Gekko madagascariensis Gray 1831
- Phelsuma sarrube [Wiegmann 1834]
- Phelsuma madagascariensis martensi Mertens 1962
- Phelsuma madagascariensis - Glaw & Vences 1994: 290

== Appearance ==
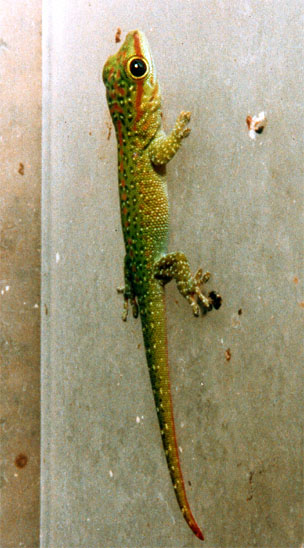
A juvenile

This lizard is one of the largest living day geckos. It can reach a total length of about 22 cm (8.7 in). The body color is light green or bluish green. The skin between the scales often has a light color. A rust-coloured stripe extends from the nostril to behind the eye. On the back there are brownish or red-brick coloured dots which may form a thin line along the mid back. These geckos do not have eyelids, and they have flattened toe pads.

== Habitat ==
P. m. magascariensis is often found on trees along the edges of forests. They also inhabit local huts and banana trees in the east coast of Madagascar because it has a humid and warm climate.

== Diet ==
In the wild this species of gecko is omnivorous, with the majority of its diet coming from terrestrial arthropods such as ants, beetles, and over 100 different species of small spiders. They occasionally consume small fruits and nectar from flowing plants.

== Behavior ==
Like most Phelsuma spec., the male intraspecific interactions can be quite quarrelsome and do not accept other males in their territory. In captivity, where the females cannot escape, the males can also sometimes seriously wound a female. In this case the male and female must be separated.

== Reproduction ==
The mating season is between November and the first weeks of April. During this period, the females lay up to 6 pairs of eggs. Since temperature of incubation related to sex; at a temperature of 28 °C, the young will hatch after approximately 55 days as females. Eggs incubated at a temperature less than 28 °C, will be hatched male. The juveniles measure 55–60 mm. Madagascar day geckos engage in a mating ritual in which sexually mature males approach the sexually mature females and attach to them with their teeth. When the courtship is complete, they will both lick their vents and let out a small noise.

== Care and maintenance in captivity ==
These animals should be housed alone, because they are highly territorial. Male and female pairs can get along but it is common that males harass females too much. They need a large, well planted terrarium. The temperature should be between 25 and 28 °C. On warm spot temperature should be 35-40 °C. The humidity at night should be maintained between 75 and 90%, on daytime between 60 and 80% In captivity, these animals can be fed with crickets, wax moth larvae, fruit flies, mealworms and houseflies. Fresh tropical fruits, honey and fruity baby foods are good to maintain their inner moisture.

== Gallery ==
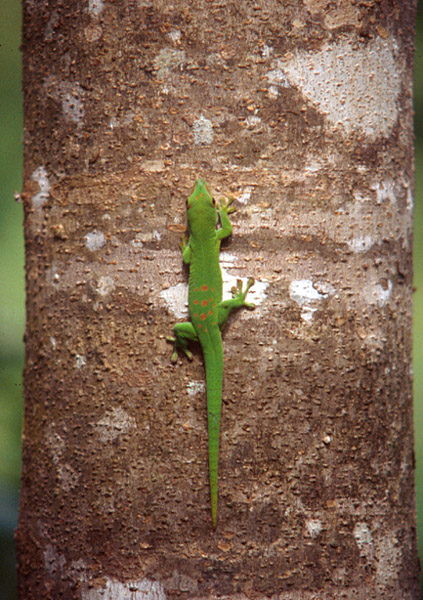

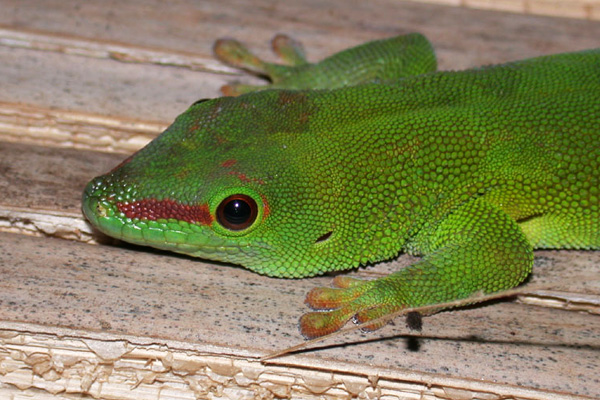

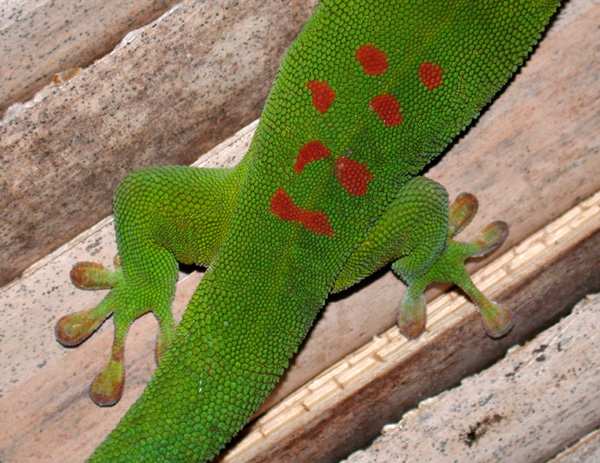
