= Wilfried Böhm =

German politician (born 1934)

Member of the Bundestag; from Hesse
- In office 13 December 1972 – 10 November 1994
- Constituency: State list (1972–1983); Hersfeld (1983–1987); State list (1987–1994)

Member of the Landtag of Hesse
- In office 1 December 1966 – 5 December 1972
- Preceded by: Multi-member district
- Succeeded by: Wolf-Dieter Firnhaber
- Constituency: State list

Personal details
- Born: 9 February 1934 Kassel, Germany
- Died: 22 September 2026 (aged 92)
- Party: Christian Democratic Union
- Education: LMU Munich; Marburg University

Wilfried Böhm (born 9 February 1934– 22 September 2026) was a German politician of the Christian Democratic Union (CDU) and former member of the German Bundestag.

== Political career ==
Böhm joined the CDU in 1959, joined the Junge Union (JU) and was district chairman of the JU North Hesse from 1962 to 1967. In the 1972 federal elections, Böhm was elected to the German Bundestag via the state list of the CDU Hessen, of which he was a member until 1994. He ran for office six times in the Hersfeld constituency. In the Bundestag he was a member of the Committee on Foreign Affairs and the Committee on Inner-German Relations.

== Literature ==
Herbst, Ludolf; Jahn, Bruno (2002). Vierhaus, Rudolf (ed.). Biographisches Handbuch der Mitglieder des Deutschen Bundestages. 1949–2002 [Biographical Handbook of the Members of the German Bundestag. 1949–2002] (in German). München: De Gruyter - De Gruyter Saur. p. 1715. ISBN 978-3-11-184511-1.
