= Justus Henning Böhmer =

German ecclesiastical jurist

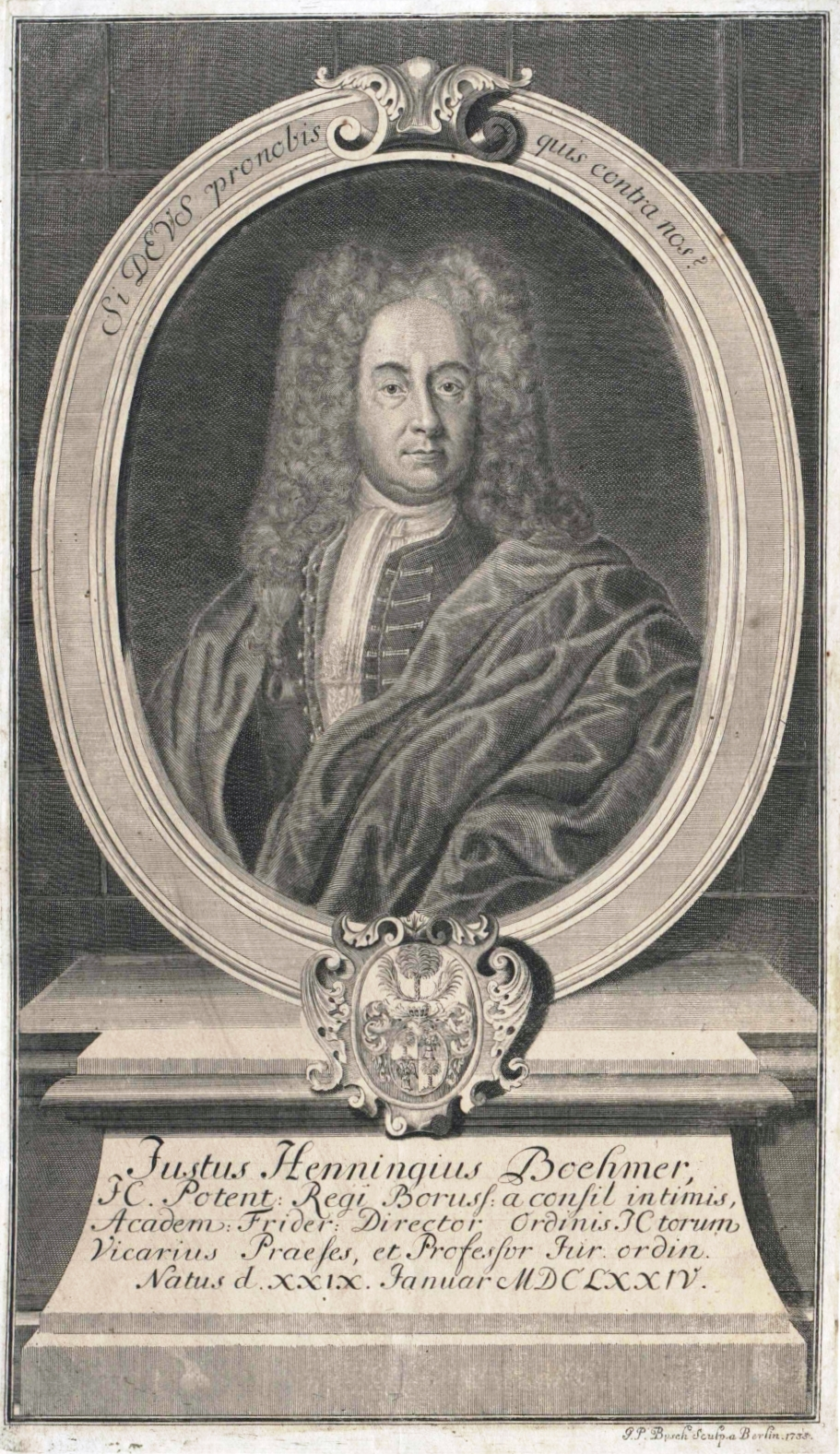
Justus Henning Böhmer

Justus Henning Böhmer (29 January 1674 – 23 August 1749) was a German jurist, ecclesiastical jurist, Professor of the University of Halle and also Geheimer Rat, count palatine and chancellor of the Duchy of Magdeburg.

== Career ==
Böhmer was born in Hanover. After his time at school in Hanover Justus Henning Böhmer studied law at the University of Jena since 1693. He attended judicial lectures inter alia with Professor Nikolaus Christoph Lyncker and also lectures in philosophy and theology. Initially after his first dissertation he was acted as an advocate in his hometown Hanover, but this employment did not meet his demands.

In the year 1697 he therefore accepted an offer from the University of Rinteln, where he lectured young noblemen on his subjects. Some months later he moved to the Martin-Luther-University of Halle which was founded 1694, where he prepared his second dissertation with Christian Thomasius, Johann Franz Buddeus and Samuel Stryck. On 27 August 1699 he succeeded to complete his licenciate of civil law and church law. After a further time of lectures he had the opportunity to establish contact to the Prussian king's court, while he attended his protégé, the young nobleman duke Heinrich Georg of Waldeck, to the court. There his extraordinary judicial talent attracted attention, and on 27 July 1701 he was promoted to associate professor at the University of Halle, where he received his doctor's degree on 11 August 1702. He owed Samuel Stryck, who was his former mentor and paternal friend, his advancement to Stryck's adjutant on 9 December 1704 and later the position as professor of the judicial faculty on 24 November 1711. After Samuel Stryck's death in the year 1715 Böhmer was appointed to the professorship and obtained also Stryk's position of feudal law.

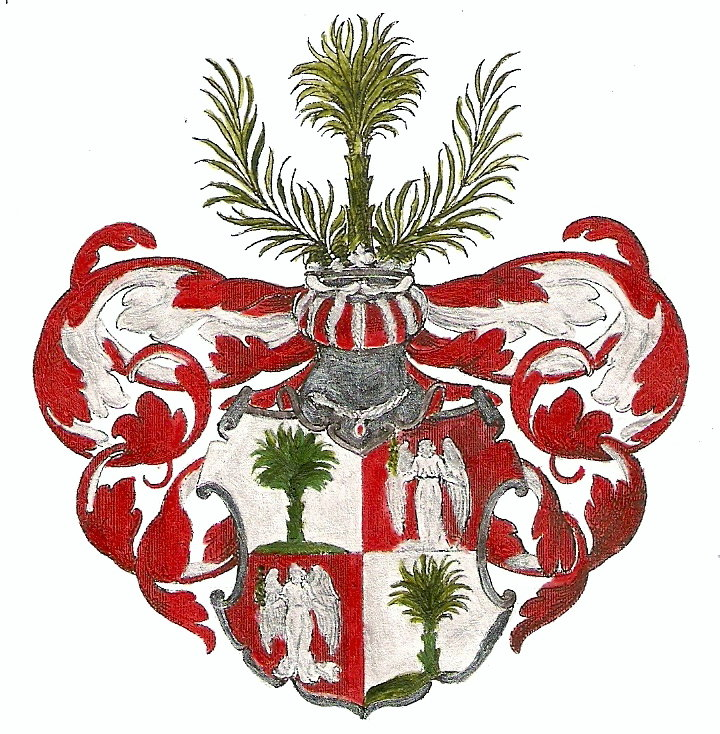
coats of arms of the imperial count palatine Justus Henning Böhmer

On 17 August that year the emperor court of Wien upgraded him to an Imperial Count Palatine (Hofpfalzgraf). Four years later, on 23 May 1719, King Frederick William I of Prussia awarded him the title Geheimer Rat and nominated him on 25 May 1719 as director of the University of Halle and deputy full professor of the judicial faculty. In the meantime and due to his good reputations he received offers from the emperor court of Wien, from the Universities of Bern, Kiel, Helmstedt, Frankfurt (Oder), Tübingen or Celle, but he disclaimed all of this, because he wanted to stay at Halle. Instead of this he advised his son Georg Ludwig Böhmer to the University of Göttingen and his son Johann Samuel Friedrich von Böhmer to the University of Frankfurt (Oder).

After the death of the chancellor of the Duchy of Magdeburg, Johann Peter von Ludewig, Böhmer was assigned Ludewig's function on 14 December 1743 and at the same time was promoted to full professor in Halle. But only a few years later he died there suddenly with an apoplectic stroke.

== Judicial efforts ==
Justus Henning Böhmer was characterised not only by his excellent scholarship, but also by his deep religious perception. Thus he composed some significant chants, especially in his earlier years.

In the judicial field initially he was a protectionist of the existing “territorial system" or Erastian theory of ecclesiastical government, but in the following years he represented a tendency to the natural right and the “Kollegialismus” (Protestant ecclesiastical theory from the 18th century in Germany, containing the Protestant perception at that time regarding the relationship between Church and State to be understood as collegia on basis of human agreement), which was mainly continued by his sons. In his first great work, Jus ecclesiasticum protestantium, he still drew on the traditional canon law, but he reformed the law to that effect that it was exempted from rigid orthodoxy, principles, resistance and dogmatism. Affected by the ideas of the Age of Enlightenment he represented an increasing critical and scientific development instead of a religious fundamentalism. Böhmers conception was predominant in the common Protestantism church law of the 18th century and was basis for further reforms to date.

His results in the domain of civil law were of similar importance. In his next main work Introductio in jus digestorum a pandects-compendium which was maintained until the 20th century, he liberated the traditional German law from the influence of the old Roman law and thus prepared the basis of the general Landrecht (law code) of the Prussian states.

A huge amount of further significant and notable works on civil and church law as well as expertises were penned by him, and were publicised by his son Georg Ludwig Böhmer after Justus Henning's death in the collected edition Exercitationes ad pandectas some years later.

== Family ==
Justus Henning Böhmer, son of the lawyer Valentin Böhmer (1634–1704) and Anna Margarethe Schirmer (1640–1714), was married to Eleonore Rosine Stützing (1679–1739). With her he had five children, four sons and one daughter who died with the age of 14 months. Three of his sons, Johann Samuel Friedrich von Böhmer (1704–1772), Karl August von Böhmer (1707–1748) and Georg Ludwig Böhmer (1715–1797) were also important German jurists, whereas the fourth son, Philipp Adolf Böhmer (1716–1789) was a professor of medicine and anatomy and also personal physician of King Frederick William II of Prussia (1744–1797).

== Works (optional) ==
- Jus parochiale, Halle, 1701
- Introductio in jus digestorum, Halle 1704
- Jus ecclesiasticum protestantium, Halle 1714
- Corpus juris canonici, Halle 1747

== Sources ==
- Johann Peter Niceron: Nachrichten von den Begebenheiten und Schriften berühmter Gelehrter; Ed..: Friedrich Eberhard Rambach, Halle 1762
- Wilhelm Schrader: Geschichte der Friedrichs-Universität zu Halle, Ferdinand Dümmlers Verlagsbuchhandlung, Bd. I., S. 146 ff., 1894;
- Peter Landau: Biography "Justus Henning Boehmer" in: "Juristen, ein biographisches Lexikon"; Ed. Michael Stolleis, 2. Auflage, 1995, München; ISBN 3-406-45957-9
- Hans-Thorald Michaelis: Geschichte der Familie von Boehmer - In Fortführung der von Hugo Erich von Boehmer im Jahre 1892 verfassten Genealogie der von Justus Henning Boehmer abstammenden Familien sowie auch einiger der mit ihnen verschwägerten Familien ("History of the Family of Boehmer - ..."), Rheinische Verlagsanstalt, Bonn-Bad Godesberg (1978); 247 pages; Privat-Archive und in Library of Congress:
- Götz von Boehmer: Halle an der Saale und Justus Henning Boehmer; Familienforschung in Mitteldeutschland – Journal 1/2004
