= Boehm =

Boehm (US: /beɪm/) is a German surname, transliterated from Böhm (literally: Bohemian, from Bohemia) or reflective of a spelling adopted by a given family before the introduction of the umlaut diacritic. It may refer to:

- Aleksandra Ziółkowska-Boehm (born 1949), American-Polish author
- Barry Boehm (1935 – 2022), American software engineer
- Christopher Boehm (1931–2021) American Anthropologist, Primatologist
- David Boehm (1893–1962), American screenwriter
- Doug Boehm (born 1969), American record producer and sound engineer
- Edward Marshall Boehm (1913–1969), American sculptor
- Elisabet Boehm (1859–1943), German feminist and writer
- Erhard F. Boehm (1911–1994), Australian farmer and amateur ornithologist
- Felix Boehm (1924–2021), Swiss-American physicist
- Franz Boehm (1880–1945), Roman Catholic priest, resistance fighter and martyr
- Gero von Boehm (born 1954), German journalist
- Gottfried Boehm (born 1942), German art historian and philosopher
- Hanns-Peter Boehm (1928–2022), German chemist and professor emeritus
- Henry Boehm (1775–1875), American clergyman and pastor
- Hermann Boehm (1884–1962), German eugenicist
- Joseph Boehm (Sir (Joseph) Edgar Boehm, 1834–1890), Austrian sculptor
- Martin Boehm (1725–1812), American clergyman and pastor
- Mary Louise Boehm (1928–2002), American pianist and painter
- Omri Boehm (born 1979), Israeli-German philosopher
- Paul Boehm (born 1974), Canadian skeleton racer
- Peter Boehm, Canadian diplomat
- Peter M. Boehm (1845–1914), soldier in the American Civil War, Medal of Honor recipient
- Robert Boehm (1914–2006), American political activist
- Rolfe Vernon Boehm, Australian architect in practice with F. Kenneth Milne 1946–1955
- Ron Boehm (1943–2017), retired ice hockey winger
- Roy Boehm (1924–2008), known as the "First SEAL"; established the U.S. Navy's first SEAL Team
- Sydney Boehm (1908–1990), American screenwriter and producer
- Theobald Boehm (1794–1881), Bavarian inventor and musician
  - Boehm system of flute fingering
  - Boehm system (clarinet), a similar system for the clarinet
- Theodore R. Boehm (born 1938), Justice of the Indiana Supreme Court
- Traugott Wilhelm Boehm (1836–1917) founder of Hahndorf Academy in South Australia

== See also ==
- Boehm system
- Boehm system (clarinet)
- Boehm garbage collector
- Behm
- Bohm (surname)
- Böhm
- Böhme (disambiguation)
- Böhmer
