= Georg Rudolf Boehmer =

German botanist and physician

Georg Rudolf Boehmer (German: Böhmer) (1 October 1723 – 4 April 1803) was a German botanist and physician born in Liegnitz.

He studied botany at the University of Leipzig under Christian Gottlieb Ludwig (1709–1773). In 1752, he succeeded Abraham Vater (1684–1751) as professor of botany and anatomy at the University of Wittenberg, where in 1782 became a professor of therapy. During his career he also had part-time duties as city physician (Stadtphysikus) in Wittenberg, later serving a similar function in Kemberg.

Among his publications was a five-volume work on natural history called Bibliotheca scriptorum historiae naturalis. The plant genus Boehmeria from the family Urticaceae is named in his honor. He is also known as an entomologist.

== Selected publications ==
- Lexicon rei Herbaria
- Technische Geschichte der Pflanzen (Technical history of plants)
- Bibliotheca scriptorum historiae naturalis, five volumes 1785–1789.
- Systematisch-literarische Handbuch der Naturgeschichte, Ökonomie und anderer damit verwandter Wissenschaften und Künste (Systematic and literary handbook of natural history, economics and related sciences and arts).
