= Horst Wolfgang Böhme =

German archaeologist

Horst Wolfgang Böhme (born May 1, 1940 in Szczecin) is a German archaeologist with a focus on Late Antiquity / Early Middle Ages and research into castles.

== Life ==
Böhme studied prehistory, Roman provincial archaeology, history and folklore in Kiel, Mainz and Munich.

In 1968 he completed a doctorate on Germanic grave finds from the 4th to the 5th century between the lower Elbe and Loire.

In 1970 he was head of department at the Germanisches Nationalmuseum in Nuremberg, then in 1972 assistant and later director of the Early Medieval Department of the Romano-Germanic Central Museum (Mainz).

With the large Salian dynasty exhibition in 1991 Böhme went into medieval archeology. The then resulting anthologies to rural settlements and castles gave impetus to the research. From 1992 until his retirement in 2005 he was a professor of ancient history and medieval archeology at the University of Marburg.

Böhme is a member of the German Archaeological Institute and the Scientific Advisory Board of the German Castles Association.

== Selection of publications ==
=== As author ===
Monographs

- Germanische Grabfunde des 4.-5. Jahrhundert zwischen unterer Elbe und Loire (= Studien zur Chronologie und Bevölkerungsgeschichte. Münchner Beiträge Vor- und Frühgeschichte. Bd. 9). Beck, München 1974, ISBN 3-406-00489-X.
- Römische Beamtenkarrieren (= Cursus honorum. Kleine Schriften zur Kenntnis der römischen Besetzungsgeschichte Südwestdeutschlands. Bd. 16). Gentner, Stuttgart 1977.

Papers

- Zur Bedeutung des spätrömischen Militärdienstes für die Stammesbildung der Baiuwaren. In: Hermann Dannheimer, Heinz Dopsch (Hrsg.): Die Bajuwaren. Von Severin bis Tassilo 488–788. Prähistorische Staatssammlung, München 1988, S. 23–37 (Katalog der gleichnamigen Ausstellung).
- Adelsgräber im Frankenreich. Archäologische Zeugnisse zur Herausbildung einer Herrenschicht unter den merowingischen Königen. In: Jahrbuch des RGZM, Jg. 40 (1993), S. 397–534, ISSN 0076-2741.
- Kontinuität und Tradition bei Wanderungsbewegungen im frühmittelalterlichen Europa vom 1.–6. Jahrhundert. In: Archäologische Informationen. Mitteilungen zur Ur- und Frühgeschichte, Jg. 19 (1996), S. 89–103, ISSN 0341-2873.
- Adel und Kirche bei den Alamannen der Merowingerzeit. In: Germania, Bd. 74 (1996), S. 477–507, ISSN 0016-8874.
- Franken und Romanen im Spiegel spätrömischer Grabfunde im nördlichen Gallien. In: Dieter Geuenich (Hrsg.): Die Franken und die Alemannen bis zur „Schlacht bei Zülpich“ (496/97). In: Reallexikon der Germanischen Altertumskunde/Ergänzungsbd.; 19. De Gruyter, Berlin 1998, S. 31–58.
- Ethnos und Religion der Bewohner Westfalens. Methodische und historische Problematik. In: Christoph Stiegemann, Matthias Wemhoff (Hrsg.): Karl der Große und Papst Leo III. in Paderborn (799. Kunst und Kultur der Karolingerzeit; 3). von Zabern, Mainz 1999, S. 237–246, ISBN 3-8053-2456-1.
- Wassermühlen im frühen Mittelalter. In: Astrid Böhme (Hrsg.): Die Regnersche Mühle in Bretzenheim. Beiträge zur Geschichte der Wassermühle (Bretzenheimer Beiträge zur Geschichte; 1). Verein für Heimatgeschichte Bretzenheim und Zahlbach, Mainz 1999, S. 26–55.
- Das nördliche Niedersachsen zwischen Spätantike und frühem Mittelalter. Zur Ethnogenese der Sachsen aus archäologischer Sicht. In: Probleme der Küstenforschung im südlichen Nordseegebiet, Jg. 28 (2003), S. 251–270, ISSN 0343-7965.

=== As editor ===
- Siedlungen und Landesausbau zur Salierzeit. 2. Aufl. Thorbecke, Sigmaringen 1992, ISBN 3-7995-4135-7.
  1. In den nördlichen Landschaften (= Monographien des RGZM. Bd. 28).
  2. In den südlichen Landschaften (= Monographien des RGZM. Bd. 27).
- Burgen der Salierzeit. Thorbecke, Sigmaringen 1992, ISBN 3-7995-4134-9.
  1. In den nördlichen Teilen des Reiches (= Monographien des RGZM. Bd. 25).
  2. In den südlichen Teilen des Reiches (= Monographien des RGZM. Bd. 26).

== Literature ==
- Claus Dobiat (Hrsg.): Reliquiae Gentium. Festschrift für Horst Wolfgang Böhme zum 65. Geburtstag. Teil I (= Internationale Archäologie. Studia honoraria. Bd. 23). Leidorf, Rahden 2005, ISBN 3-89646-423-X.
- Interdisziplinäre Studien zur europäischen Burgenforschung. Festschrift für Horst Wolfgang Böhme zum 65. Geburtstag. Teil II (= Veröffentlichungen der Deutschen Burgenvereinigung. Reihe A: Forschungen. Bd. 9). Deutsche Burgenvereinigung, Braubach 2005, ISBN 3-927558-24-9.
