= Bohm =

Bohm is a surname. Notable people with the surname include:

- Alec Bohm (born 1996), American baseball player
- Carl Bohm (1844–1920), German songwriter and composer
- David Bohm (1917–1992), American theoretical physicist
- Dorothy Bohm (1924–2023), Königsberg-born British photographer
- Hark Bohm (1939–2025), German actor, screenwriter, film director, playwright and professor for cinema studies
- Marquard Bohm (1941–2006), German actor
- Michael Bohm (born 1965), American journalist based in Russia
- Uwe Bohm (1962–2022), German actor

== See also ==
- Böhm (disambiguation)
- Böhme (disambiguation)
- Boehm
