= Oderberg (Amt) =

German municipality

Coordinates: 52.900°N 14.083°E

Amt Oderberg was an Amt ("collective municipality") in the district of Barnim, in Brandenburg, Germany. Its seat was in the town Oderberg. It was merged with the Amt Britz-Chorin to form the Amt Britz-Chorin-Oderberg in January 2009.

The Amt Oderberg consisted of the following municipalities:

1. Hohensaaten
2. Liepe
3. Lunow-Stolzenhagen
4. Oderberg
5. Parsteinsee
