= Britz (disambiguation) =

Britz may refer to:

Places in Germany

- Britz, a part of the Neukölln district in Berlin
- Britz Canal in Berlin
- Berlin-Britz transmitter
- Britz-Süd (Berlin U-Bahn), a Berlin U-Bahn station
- Schloss Britz, a former manor-house in Berlin-Neukölln
- Britz, Brandenburg, a town in the district of Barnim in Brandenburg
- Britz railway station in Britz, Brandenburg
- Britz-Chorin, an Amt ("collective municipality") in Barnim, Brandenburg
- Britz-Chorin-Oderberg, an Amt ("collective municipality") in Barnim, Brandenburg

Other

- Britz (film), a two-part British television drama film
- Britz, a rental campervan brand of Tourism Holdings Limited in New Zealand
- SV Stern Britz 1889, a German football club
- Britz (surname)
