= Britz-Chorin =

German municipality

Coordinates: 52.900°N 13.867°E

Amt Britz-Chorin was an Amt ("collective municipality") in the district of Barnim, in Brandenburg, Germany. Its seat was in the town Britz. It was merged with the Amt Oderberg to form the Amt Britz-Chorin-Oderberg in January 2009.

The Amt Britz-Chorin consisted of the following municipalities:

1. Britz
2. Chorin
3. Hohenfinow
4. Niederfinow
