= Walter Beling =

German political activist and party official who opposed Nazism

- Born: 19 May 1899; Berlin, Germany
- Died: 31 May 1988 (aged 89); East Berlin, German Democratic Republic
- Occupations: Political Activist; Trades Unionist and official ("shop steward"); Party official Résistance activist Political journalist Diplomat
- Political party: KPD; SED
- Spouse: Thea Saefkow (born Theodora Brey: 1909–1990)

Walter Beling (19 May 1899 – 31 May 1988) was a German political activist and party official (KPD) who became a resistance activist during the Hitler years. He was released from prison, possibly due to an administrative error, in 1936 and fled the country. He spent much of his time during the war in the so-called "free zone" of occupied France. He returned to occupied Germany in November 1945 and took over as editor-in-chief at the Berliner Rundfunk (radio station). A succession of senior political appointments followed till 1950 when, like many senior party officials at around the same time, he abruptly fell from favour. He was grudgingly more or less rehabilitated in 1956, and at one point transferred to the Foreign Ministry: he undertook a diplomatic posting in Geneva between 1959 and 1965 as East Germany's permanent representative to the United Nations Economic Commission for Europe.

== Life ==
=== Provenance and early years ===
Walter Beling was born in Berlin, the son of a tailor. His mother is described simply as a "home worker". He attended school locally between 1906 and 1913, also finding time to work as a messenger-boy. Between 1913 and 1917 he served an apprenticeship in metal work and engineering, which he combined with six terms as a student at Berlin's Machine Construction Academy ("Berliner Maschinenbauschule"). After concluding the course at the academy he briefly took office job with a succession of trading businesses. However, notwithstanding his participation in peace demonstrations on the streets of Berlin during 1915 and 1916, by the end of 1916 he had been conscripted for military service. After briefly serving "alongside machine gunners" he was transferred to the "war navy" (""Kriegsmarine) with four others who, like him, had worked as machinists. According to his own later explanation, this was in order that the five of them might be used as "consultants" in connection with the ever more "feverish" programme of submarine construction that was an important feature of the First World War (1914–1918). The Kiel mutiny which broke out at the start of November 1918 in response to what was seen as a desperate and suicidal set of orders from the German admirals is widely viewed as a final trigger point which unleashed twelve months of riots and insurrections across Germany – especially in the naval ports and industrial heartlands - which came to be known as Germany's November revolution. Beling was stationed in Kiel at the time, and took part in the insurrection, although surviving details of his personal involvement are vague. As the revolt spread across Germany he moved across to Berlin where he took part in the Spartacist uprising at the start of 1919.

=== Politics ===
In 1919 Beling became a trades unionist, employed in the manufacturing sector and serving as a shop steward ("Betriebsvertrauensmann") between 1919 and 1926, a role which several times led to his being picked out for disciplinary measures. In 1924 he became a member of the Communist Party which had been established five years earlier. During 1924–25 he became a leader of a party cell at the business in which he worked, and soon progressed to the role of a party group leader. Between 1926 and 1929 he worked for a time in the commercial sector, while also serving, between 1926 and 1930, as deputy chairman, and then chairman and head of policy ("Polleiter"), of the party leadership team for the Berlin-Prenzlauer Berg sub-region.

=== Party official ===
During 1928 he started working for the party central committee, employed in the treasury department under the leadership of comrade Artur Golke the party treasurer. In 1930 Walter Beling took over as head of the finance department, a position he held under Golke's direction until April 1933. Between 1929 and 1931 he also served as a member of the party leadership team ("Bezirksleitung") for Berlin. During 1932 he spent some time in Amsterdam on party business. Later that year he spent six months attending a "teacher training" course at the party academy just outside Berlin. After that, he himself became involved in party education at various locations round the country during 1932–33.

=== Régime change ===
In January 1933 Adolf Hitler took advantage of several years of intensifying political polarisation and parliamentary deadlock to take power. The new government lost no time in transforming Germany into a one-party dictatorship. The Reichstag fire which broke out overnight on 27–28 February 1933 was instantly blamed on "communists". A decree signed off on 28 February opened the way for a rapid assault on civil liberties, and within 24 hours large numbers of known Communist Party leaders and officials had been rounded up by the security services. Beling avoided capture and continued with his party work. Artur Golke fled abroad and Beling took over as national treasurer of the now "underground" communist party, identified by comrades with the party pseudonym of "Wallbaum".

=== Arrest and conviction ===
It is reported and repeated that Beling's whereabouts was betrayed to the security services by Werner Kraus and Paul Grobis. It is certainly widely attested that the long-standing communist official and politician Werner Kraus was arrested early in July 1933, and almost immediately (possibly under torture) "changed sides", quickly betraying a number of former comrades. Walter Beling was arrested in Berlin on 20 July 1933 and badly tortured.

In order to avoid problems arising from "wrong" decisions emerging from the established German justice system, the government had, in 1933, revived the old tradition of using "special courts" for political trials. The trial of Walter Beling, whose political activity self-evidently amounted to anti-government resistance, was clearly political, and on 21 March 1935 the special "Peoples' Court" sentenced him to a thirty month prison term for undertaking activities on behalf of the (since 1933 illegal) Communist Party.

=== Exile ===
Beling spent the first part of his sentence in Berlin's Plötzensee Prison. Later he was moved to the prison at nearby Luckau. In January 1936 he was unconditionally released. The reason for his early release is unclear. According to one source his release was not notified to the security services, due to a "technical oversight". Although he was presumably kept under close surveillance, in February 1936 he managed to escape to Prague which, along with Moscow and Paris, had by this time become a principal centre for hundreds of German political refugees. In Prague he resumed his employment with the party central committee. His duties included the editorship of the party's German-language newspaper, "Deutschland-Informationen". In November 1936 Beling moved on again, this time to Paris. Here he was a member of the party's western leadership team ("KPD-Abschnittsleitung West"), again working in the party's treasury department. Between 1936 and 1939 he was, in addition, a contributing editor to the party newspapers and journals, "Rote Fahne", "Internationale" and "Rundschau". During 1937/38 he supported the "freedom struggle of the Spanish people" through his work for the Madrid-based German-language radio station "Deutscher Freiheitssender 29,8".

=== War ===
The British and French governments both reacted to the outbreak of war in September 1939 by promptly rounding up and interning several thousand German political refugees from Nazism who, after 1933, had hitherto found a relatively safe refuge in their countries. German communists based in Paris such as Walter Beling were arrested at the start of this process, in September 1939: Beling was then interned in a succession of camps. The camps used were in the south-west of France, having been set up in 1938–39 to accommodate returning fighters following the Nationalists' victory in the Spanish Civil War. Tight security had not been a priority when they were constructed: in June 1940 Walter Beling escaped. In the immediate aftermath of the German invasion, he was now in the so-called "free zone" of France, administered by a puppet government under the leadership of the wartime hero, Philippe Pétain. Following his escape, Walter Beling made his way to Toulouse, where he lived and worked unregistered (meaning "illegally").

Toulouse was already becoming a focus for German communist exiles who had escaped from camps in southern France, or simply made their way south when the German army invaded France from the north in May 1940. Links were established to French communists who were becoming a leading element in the Résistance movement against the German military occupation in the north and the Pétain puppet government in the south. From the time of his escape Beling was therefore part of a well supported underground activist network. His party role at this time is variously described: according to at least one source he was the German party leader for the Toulouse region, identified by comrades under the party pseudonyms of "Claude" or "Clément". In September 1940 Beling came to an agreement with Maurice Tréand (who was representing the Central Committee of the French Communist Party in their discussions together) which led to the establishment of the so-called Travail allemand (literally, "German work") sub-section inside the French Résistance organisation. This provided important underpinning for closer collaboration between German communists operating "underground" in occupied France and Résistance comrades, reducing the mutual suspicion which was inherent in the situation. The Résistance was able to provide extensive "infrastructure support", including provision of counterfeit identity documents whereby German communists having acquired the necessary language skills could blend into the surrounding francophone population. Résistance comrades were also often able to arrange hiding places as the German occupation became more oppressive and, especially after 1942, German security service personnel were frequently to be encountered on French streets, even in the so-called "free zone".

Although sources are largely silent about Beling's resistance activity in France, reports survive of his involvement in attempts to free Franz Dahlem, a senior German Communist politician both before and after the twelve Hitler years. During the first part of 1941 the Résistance organised a mass break-out from the camp at Le Vernet, when Dahlem was being held, but for some reason Dahlem was not among those who managed to escape, and the German officials, evidently fully aware of Dahlem's political importance ordered the French puppet government to hand him over immediately. In the event, apparently very much against the odds, Dahlem survived a succession of Gestapo interrogations and subsequent internment in camps in Germany, but the attempts to secure his freedom in which Beling was involved must nevertheless be counted a failure, and on 12 December 1941 it was Walter Beling who was spotted in Marseille and (again) arrested: he was sentenced to a six month prison term. He was interned in the nearby Camp des Milles. He was not released at the end of his six month sentence. Faced with the accelerating threat that he might be sent back to Germany, where the interrogation would probably be more intense and conditions of detention worse, at the start of September 1942 Beling again managed to escape from the camp in which he was being held and re-engaged in the Résistance.

During his time in France, Beling also came into contact with Noel Field. Noel Field was an Anglo-American spy: through several intervening generations sources have differed strikingly over whether his ultimate loyalty, in matters of espionage, was to the Soviet Union or to the United States and their respective proxies. In 1941 Field became head of the Marseille-based US Unitarian Universalist Service Committee which won plaudits from many sides, providing relief for escaping Jewish refugees, antifascists and leftists, and helping many to flee to Switzerland or North America. It is hard to determine the extent to which Beling and Field ever worked together. What is clear, however, is that in the spirit of Cold War mistrust that came about after 1945, and which could border on paranoia, Walter Beling's involvement with Noel Field would cost him very dearly.

As the war entered its final phase, during 1943–44 Beling was a member of the "Comité Allemagne libre pour l’Ouest", a western version of the National Committee for a Free Germany that had grown up among German prisoners of war with the backing of the Soviet authorities in the (very much larger) prison camps of the Soviet Union.

=== Soviet occupation zone ===
War ended in May 1945, leaving the western two-thirds of Germany divided into four military occupation zones. Walter Beling returned to Berlin in November 1945, making his home in the part of the city that had become part of the Soviet occupation zone (to be relaunched in October 1949 as the Soviet sponsored German Democratic Republic / East Germany). Almost immediately he accepted an appointment as editor in chief of Berliner Rundfunk, a radio station which despite initially having its studios physically located in a district of Berlin administered by the British Military, had been established by the Soviet Military Administration and operated under the direction of the Soviet military authorities. He held his post in charge of the radio station through much of 1946.

April 1946 saw the launch of the Socialist Unity Party ("Sozialistische Einheitspartei Deutschlands" / SED), formed through a contentious merger of the Communist Party and the Social Democratic Party. (Note: Although the architects of the party merger may have hoped that it might be established across all four German occupation zones, in the three "western" zones, the SED never became established.) In the Soviet zone hundreds of thousands of Communist Party members and a large number of SPD members lost no time in signing their party memberships over to the new party, determined that divisions on the political left should never again leave the way open to a successful populist power grab on behalf of the political right. The organisational structure of the SED was, initially, relatively fluid. In 1947 Walter Beling became a member of the "Parteivorstand (PV)", the executive body that managed what became, between 1946 and 1949, the ruling party in a new kind of German one-party dictatorship. He was also elected, at the party congress of September 1947 to membership of the Central Secretariat of the "Parteivorstand". As the SED evolved between 1946 and 1949, its organisational structure aligned ever more closely with that devised by Lenin for the Soviet Communist Party. At some point the "Parteivorstand" mutated into a Soviet-style Party Central Committee. Sources avoid spelling out whether Beling's "Parteivorstand" membership was ever formally translated into membership of the Central Committee: within then party management structure over which the Central Committee presided, he did become head of the Finance Department and of the Party Administration ("Geschäftsangelegen") Department.

Along with his party functions, in 1948 Beling found himself installed as "sole shareholder" ("Alleingesellschafter") of "Konzentration GmbH", a politically oriented printing and publishing operation, recently taken under government control.

Sources differ over whether it was in 1948 or 1950 that Walter Beling married Theodora (Thea) Saefkow (born Brey: 1909–1990), a miner's daughter and another energetic political activist who, like him, had spent the war years operating "underground" as a Résistance activist in occupied France.

=== Fall from favour in the German Democratic Republic ===
The arrest on 30 May 1949 of László Rajk in Budapest and the confessions extracted from Rajk under torture became the starting point for a succession of show trials. It came a couple of weeks after the arrest in Prague of Noel Field, who was handed over to the Hungarian authorities following his arrest. The premise of Field's trial, which opened in September 1949, was that during the war he had, with his agents, worked to undermine the development of indigenous resistance, in order to strengthen Western influence and create a divided postwar Germany. Noel Field was "one of the leaders of American espionage," who "specialized in recruiting spies from among left-wing elements." Field was badly and repeatedly tortured and held in solitary confinement for the next five years. For the party leadership in East Germany, under intensifying pressure from popular discontent and a faltering economy, the Field affair provided an opportunity to remove from positions of influence a large number of party officials who were suspected of quietly harbouring their own ideas about the future of socialism. The party leadership in East Berlin consisted largely of men who had spent the war years in Moscow, planning in considerable detail a Soviet-style "socialist" future for Germany. At the end of April 1945 a tight-knit group of 30 men had arrived from Moscow and intensively set about their nation-building project. After the events of 1948 it became apparent that they would need to abandon dreams of imposing their blueprint across all four occupation zones, but the implementation of their plan continued to unfold, fully backed by military administration, in the Soviet zone. Leadership paranoia extended to an intensifying fear that comrades who had spent the war years not in Moscow but in "the west" might not be true believers in "the plan". A wave of arrests began in 1950. The most high-profile victim among the senior party officials caught up in the political purge was Paul Merker. An intriguingly high proportion of the purge victims were men who had spent the war years in France. Walter Beling was an energetic senior party official who had spent the war years in France. During that period he had been in contact with Noel Field. In August 1950 he was stripped of his entire portfolio of party functions "on account of his links in exile with Noel H. Field". (Note: "... wegen der im Exil zu Noel H. Field unterhaltenen Verbindungen.") The shock of the experience was so great that Beling was judged medically unfit for work till November 1951.

=== Beyond politics ===
Between 1951 and 1955 Beling worked at "VEB Kranbau Eberswalde", a crane manufacturing enterprise where he worked initially as a "Normensachbearbeiter", concerned with conformity and quality of production. He subsequently became deputy head and then head of the business organisation department and later "kommissarischer Arbeitsdirektor", concerned with labour issues at the facility.

=== Partial return to respectability ===
The death of Stalin in 1953 and the growing awareness of Nikita Khrushchev's "secret" speech, delivered early in 1956, marked a slow easing of the political paranoia at the heart of the East German political establishment. The party exhonerated Beling in July 1956 which involved setting aside the party punishments imposed in August 1950. This fell some way short of a full formal rehabilitation, but subsequent developments in his career followed by the awarding of certain state honours confirmed at least that Walter Beling was no longer regarded, within the party, as beyond the political pale. It was still July 1956 when he accepted a posting to the Foreign Ministry as head of the main "Europe" department. He then served, between 1959 and 1965, as East Germany's permanent representative to the United Nations Economic Commission for Europe. The job was based in Geneva: in a country where foreign travel was a rare privilege rather than a right, the posting to Switzerland indicates that any involvement with Noel Field was long forgiven or forgotten by the East German party leadership.

=== Death ===
Walter Beling died in Berlin on 31 May 1988, so did not live to experience all the changes that led to reunification. He predeceased his wife by less than two years. Their physical remains have been placed together in the special Memorial to the socialists section at the Friedrichsfelde main cemetery.

== Awards and honours ==
- 1958 Medal for participation in the armed struggle of the German Working Class between 1918 and 1923
- 1959 Patriotic Order of Merit in silver
- 1964 Patriotic Order of Merit in gold
- 1969 Order of Karl Marx
- 1974 Patriotic Order of Merit gold clasp
- 1984 Star of People's Friendship in gold
