= Hohenfinow =

- Municipality
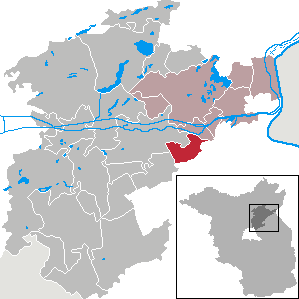
- Location of Hohenfinow within Barnim district
- Interactive map of Hohenfinow
- Location within Germany Location within Brandenburg
- Coordinates: 52°49′N 13°56′E
- Country: Germany
- State: Brandenburg
- District: Barnim
- Municipal assoc.: Britz-Chorin-Oderberg

Government
  - Mayor (2024–29): Ronny Püschel

Area
  - Total: 21.84 km^{2} (8.43 sq mi)
- Elevation: 55 m (180 ft)

Population (2025-12-31)
  - Total: 524
  - Density: 24.0/km^{2} (62.1/sq mi)
- Time zone: UTC+01:00 (CET)
  - Summer (DST): UTC+02:00 (CEST)
- Postal codes: 16248
- Dialling codes: 033362
- Vehicle registration: BAR
- Website: britz-chorin-oderberg.de

Hohenfinow (German pronunciation: [hoːənˈfiːnoː]) is a municipality in the Barnim district in Brandenburg, Germany. It is part of the Amt ("collective municipality") Amt Britz-Chorin-Oderberg.

== Geography ==
Hohenfinow is located about 8 km (5.0 mi) east of Eberswalde. It is part of a rural area on the northeastern rim of the Barnim Plateau, south of the Finow River and the Finow Canal. The glacial valley in the north with the neighbouring municipality of Niederfinow separates it from the adjacent Uckermark region. The historic village centre is surrounded by extended fields, meadows and pine forests.

== History ==
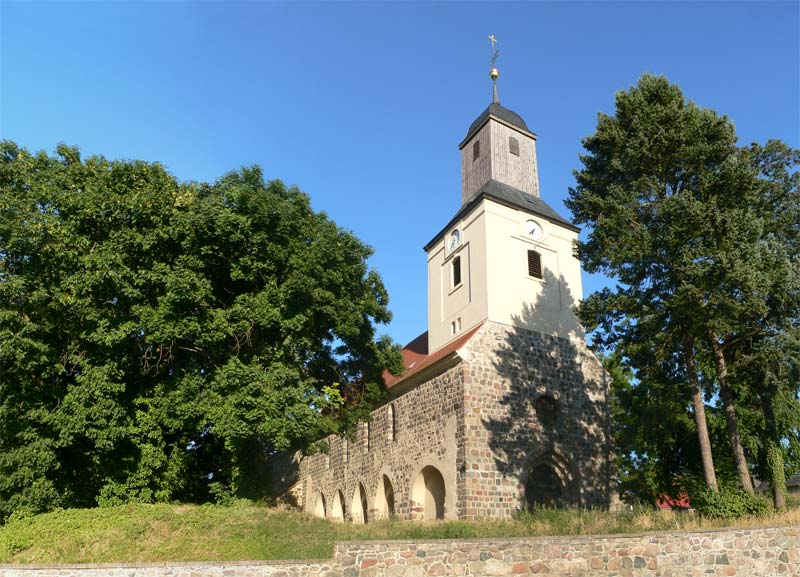
Parish church

A fortress overlooking the Finow valley and a ford across the river was erected about 1220, after the area settled by Polabian Slavs had been conquered by the Ascanian margraves of Brandenburg. The foundations of the parish church date back to around 1250. The settlement itself was first mentioned in a 1334 deed issued by the Wittelsbach margrave Louis I.

Temporarily held by Count Henry Matthias of Thurn, the estates were sold to the Pfuel noble family in 1614. During the indecisive stance of Brandenburg in the Thirty Years' War, Hohenfinow was devastated by a contingent under Ernst von Mansfeld in 1626, and again by Imperial, Saxon and Swedish troops in the following years. The rebuilding began with three remaining farmsteads. In 1780 the cornfields of Hohenfinow were mentioned in a travel account by Johann III Bernoulli.

From 1815 to 1947, Hohenfinow was part of the Prussian Province of Brandenburg. In 1855 the Hohenfinow manor was purchased by Felix von Bethmann Hollweg (1824–1900), scion of a Frankfurt banking dynasty and father of the later German chancellor Theobald von Bethmann Hollweg, who was born here in 1856. In the last days of World War II, a unit of the "Army Detachment Steiner" rested near Hohenfinow before the troops withdraw to Eberswalde.

From 1947 to 1952, Hohenfinow was part of the State of Brandenburg, from 1952 to 1990 of the East German Bezirk Frankfurt and since 1990 again of Brandenburg.

== Demography ==
Development of population since 1875 within the current boundaries (Blue line: Population; Dotted line: Comparison to population development of Brandenburg state; Grey background: Time of Nazi rule; Red background: Time of communist rule)

Hohenfinow: Population development
within the current boundaries (2020)

Year	Pop.	±% p.a.
1875	776	—
1890	758	−0.16%
1910	812	+0.34%
1925	879	+0.53%
1933	864	−0.21%
1939	872	+0.15%
1946	894	+0.36%
1950	1,015	+3.22%
1964	829	−1.44%
1971	849	+0.34%
1981	639	−2.80%
1985	579	−2.43%
1989	580	+0.04%
1990	574	−1.03%
1991	563	−1.92%

Year	Pop.	±% p.a.
1992	546	−3.02%
1993	539	−1.28%
1994	541	+0.37%
1995	539	−0.37%
1996	558	+3.53%
1997	569	+1.97%
1998	581	+2.11%
1999	571	−1.72%
2000	575	+0.70%
2001	555	−3.48%
2002	550	−0.90%
2003	543	−1.27%
2004	538	−0.92%
2005	537	−0.19%
2006	524	−2.42%

Year	Pop.	±% p.a.
2007	513	−2.10%
2008	509	−0.78%
2009	521	+2.36%
2010	524	+0.58%
2011	519	−0.95%
2012	500	−3.66%
2013	512	+2.40%
2014	512	+0.00%
2015	526	+2.73%
2016	528	+0.38%
2017	525	−0.57%
2018	515	−1.90%
2019	522	+1.36%
2020	537	+2.87%
