= Althüttendorf =

- Municipality
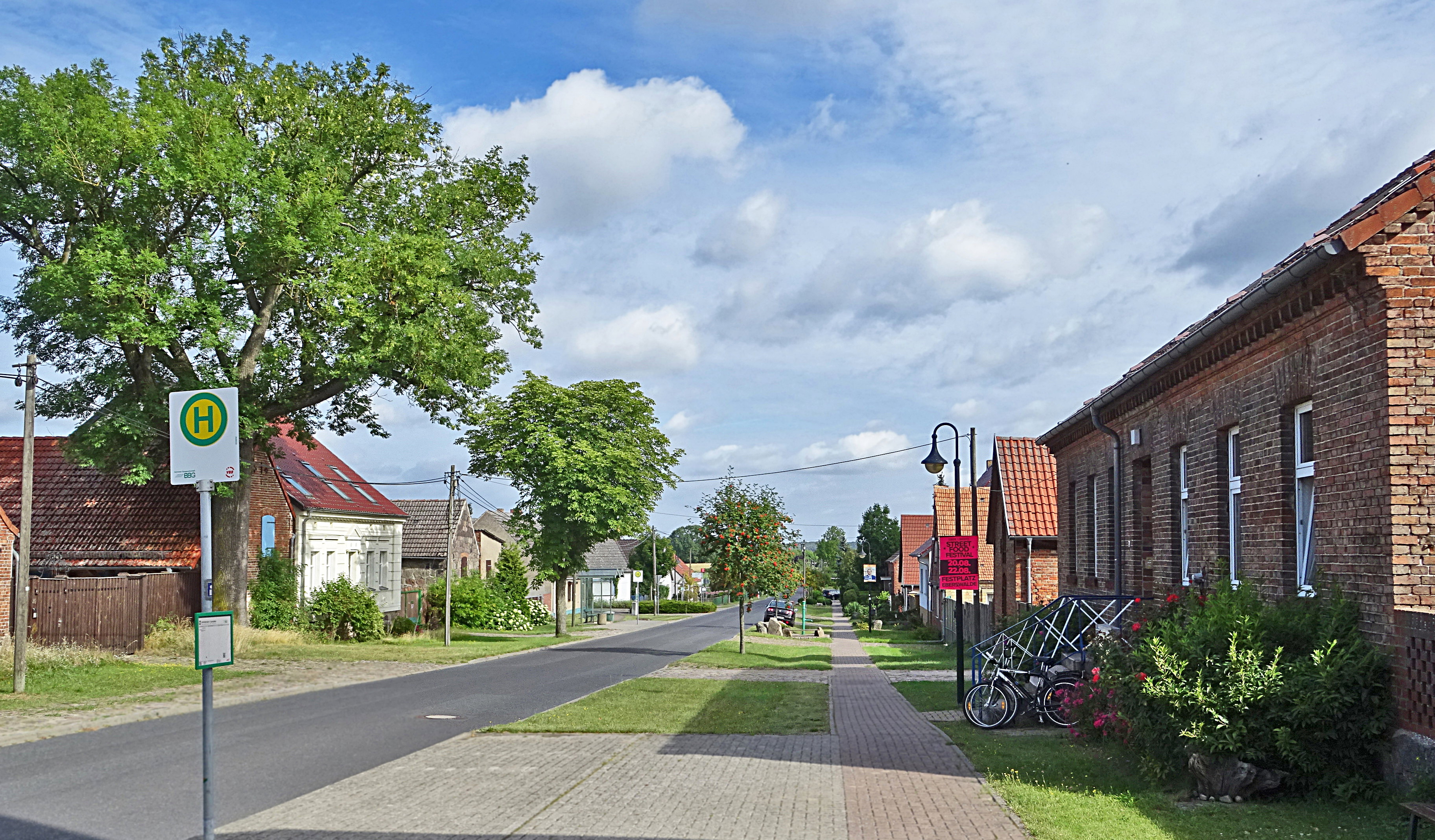

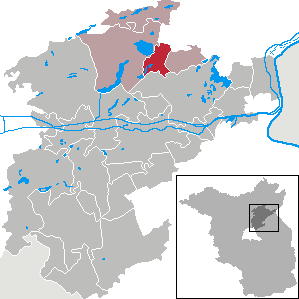
- Location of Althüttendorf within Barnim district
- Interactive map of Althüttendorf
- Location within Germany Location within Brandenburg
- Coordinates: 52°58′00″N 13°48′00″E
- Country: Germany
- State: Brandenburg
- District: Barnim
- Municipal assoc.: Joachimsthal (Schorfheide)
- Subdivisions: 2 Ortsteile

Government
  - Mayor (2024–29): Wilfried Kornack

Area
  - Total: 18.79 km^{2} (7.25 sq mi)
- Elevation: 75 m (246 ft)

Population (2025-12-31)
  - Total: 670
  - Density: 36/km^{2} (92/sq mi)
- Time zone: UTC+01:00 (CET)
  - Summer (DST): UTC+02:00 (CEST)
- Postal codes: 16247
- Dialling codes: 03 33 61
- Vehicle registration: BAR
- Website: www.amt-joachimsthal.de

Althüttendorf (German pronunciation: [ˈaltˌhʏtn̩dɔʁf]) is a municipality in the district of Barnim in Brandenburg in Germany.

== History ==
From 1815 to 1947, Althüttendorf was part of the Prussian Province of Brandenburg, from 1947 to 1952 of the State of Brandenburg, from 1952 to 1990 of the Bezirk Frankfurt of East Germany and since 1990 again of Brandenburg.

== Demography ==
Development of population since 1875 within the current boundaries (Blue line: Population; Dotted line: Comparison to population development of Brandenburg state; Grey background: Time of Nazi rule; Red background: Time of communist rule)

Althüttendorf: Population development
within the current boundaries (2020)

Year	Pop.	±% p.a.
1875	950	—
1890	713	−1.90%
1910	763	+0.34%
1925	770	+0.06%
1933	786	+0.26%
1939	773	−0.28%
1946	912	+2.39%
1950	966	+1.45%
1964	807	−1.28%
1971	783	−0.43%
1981	660	−1.69%
1985	664	+0.15%
1989	636	−1.07%
1990	625	−1.73%
1991	617	−1.28%

Year	Pop.	±% p.a.
1992	701	+13.61%
1993	746	+6.42%
1994	766	+2.68%
1995	772	+0.78%
1996	748	−3.11%
1997	772	+3.21%
1998	776	+0.52%
1999	785	+1.16%
2000	766	−2.42%
2001	766	+0.00%
2002	737	−3.79%
2003	734	−0.41%
2004	764	+4.09%
2005	742	−2.88%
2006	738	−0.54%

Year	Pop.	±% p.a.
2007	719	−2.57%
2008	785	+9.18%
2009	756	−3.69%
2010	749	−0.93%
2011	690	−7.88%
2012	805	+16.67%
2013	768	−4.60%
2014	675	−12.11%
2015	614	−9.04%
2016	564	−8.14%
2017	585	+3.72%
2018	579	−1.03%
2019	583	+0.69%
2020	607	+4.12%
