= Ziethen, Brandenburg =

Ziethen
- Municipality
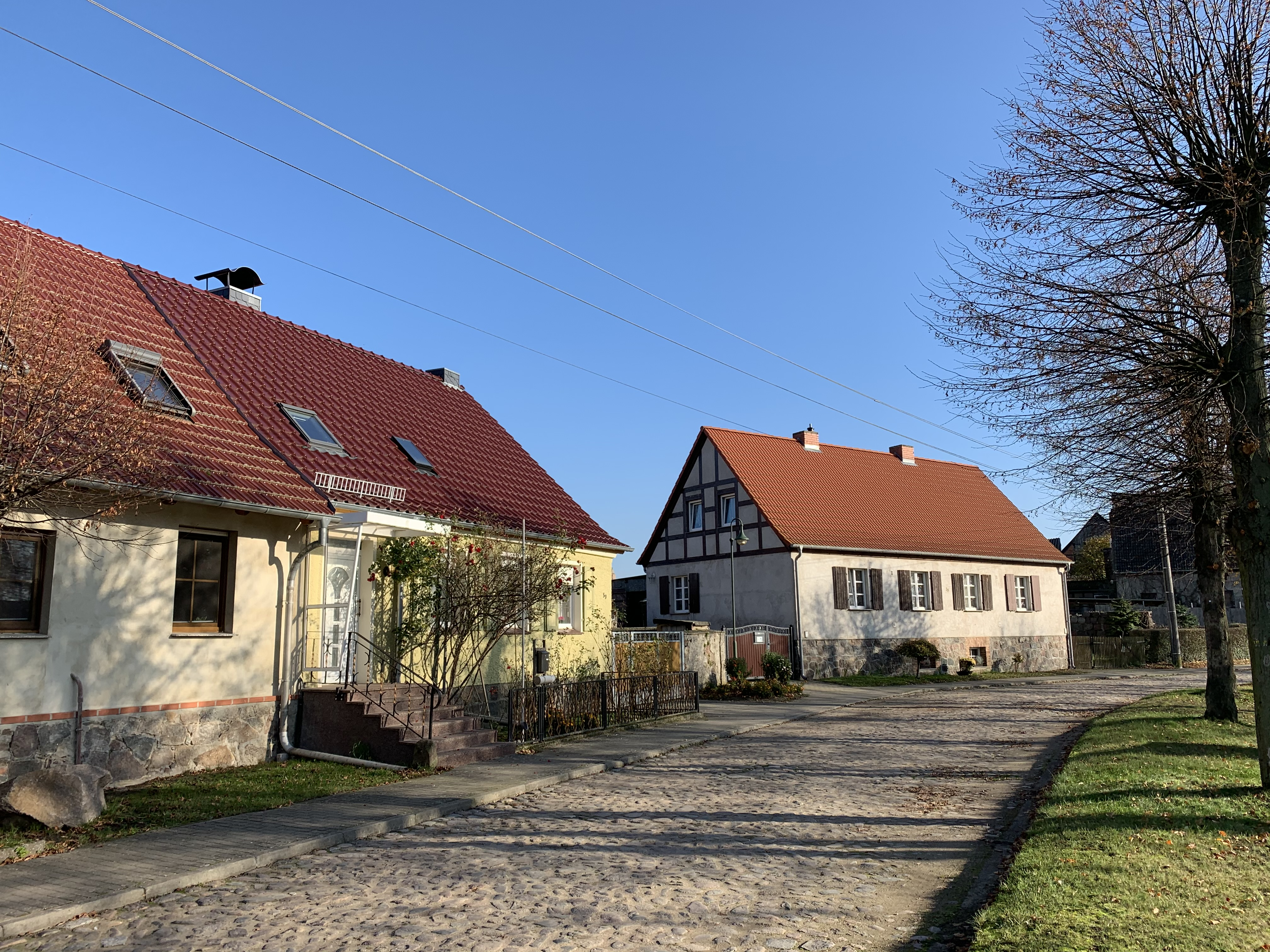

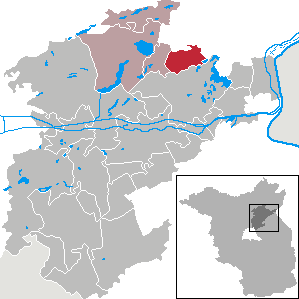
- Location of Ziethen within Barnim district
- Interactive map of Ziethen
- Location within Germany Location within Brandenburg
- Coordinates: 52°58′00″N 13°55′00″E
- Country: Germany
- State: Brandenburg
- District: Barnim
- Municipal assoc.: Joachimsthal (Schorfheide)
- Subdivisions: 2 Ortsteile

Government
  - Mayor (2024–29): Michael Dupont

Area
  - Total: 24.36 km^{2} (9.41 sq mi)
- Elevation: 50 m (160 ft)

Population (2025-12-31)
  - Total: 433
  - Density: 17.8/km^{2} (46.0/sq mi)
- Time zone: UTC+01:00 (CET)
  - Summer (DST): UTC+02:00 (CEST)
- Postal codes: 16247
- Dialling codes: 033364
- Vehicle registration: BAR
- Website: www.amt-joachimsthal.de

Ziethen (German pronunciation: [ˈtsiːtn̩]) is a municipality in the district of Barnim in Brandenburg in north-eastern Germany.

== History ==
On 1 February 2002, the municipality of Ziethen was formed by merging the municipalities of Groß-Ziethen and Klein Ziethen.

In 1686, a commune of French Huguenots was founded in Groß-Ziethen and Klein-Ziethen.

From 1815 to 1947, Groß-Ziethen and Klein-Ziethen were part of the Prussian Province of Brandenburg, from 1947 to 1952 of the State of Brandenburg, from 1952 to 1990 of the East German Bezirk Frankfurt and since 1990 again of Brandenburg, since 2002 united as the municipality of Ziethen.

== Demography ==
Development of population since 1875 within the current boundaries (Blue line: Population; Dotted line: Comparison to population development of Brandenburg state; Grey background: Time of Nazi rule; Red background: Time of communist rule)

Ziethen: Population development
within the current boundaries (2020)

Year	Pop.	±% p.a.
1875	1,062	—
1890	961	−0.66%
1910	1,052	+0.45%
1925	983	−0.45%
1933	929	−0.70%
1939	927	−0.04%
1946	1,228	+4.10%
1950	1,192	−0.74%
1964	849	−2.39%
1971	807	−0.72%
1981	588	−3.12%
1985	557	−1.34%
1989	517	−1.85%
1990	493	−4.64%
1991	496	+0.61%

Year	Pop.	±% p.a.
1992	487	−1.81%
1993	500	+2.67%
1994	488	−2.40%
1995	493	+1.02%
1996	500	+1.42%
1997	505	+1.00%
1998	517	+2.38%
1999	504	−2.51%
2000	489	−2.98%
2001	485	−0.82%
2002	491	+1.24%
2003	500	+1.83%
2004	486	−2.80%
2005	483	−0.62%
2006	485	+0.41%

Year	Pop.	±% p.a.
2007	479	−1.24%
2008	474	−1.04%
2009	485	+2.32%
2010	459	−5.36%
2011	455	−0.87%
2012	470	+3.30%
2013	461	−1.91%
2014	446	−3.25%
2015	449	+0.67%
2016	443	−1.34%
2017	443	+0.00%
2018	450	+1.58%
2019	458	+1.78%
2020	446	−2.62%
