= NoLabel =

Polish post-production and visual effects studio

NOLABEL sp. z o.o.
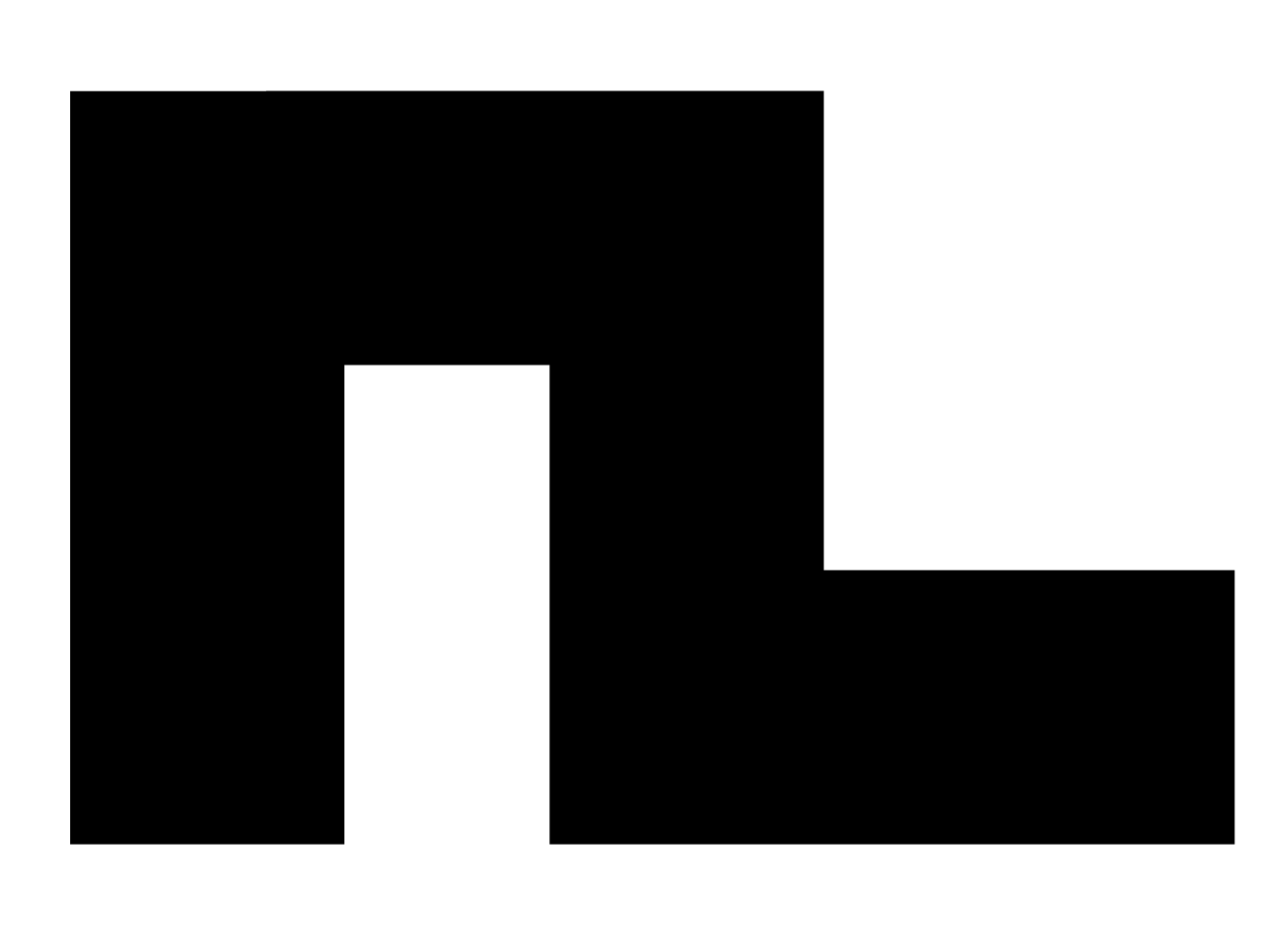
- Industry: Visual effects, CGI animation, Motion pictures, Post-production
- Founded: 2006
- Headquarters: Kraków, Poland
- Key people: Krzysztof Hrycak (CEO)
- Website: https://nolabel.com.pl/

NoLabel is a Polish visual effects (VFX) and post-production studio based in Kraków, specializing in VFX, high-end CGI, and fluid simulations for feature films, television series, and advertising.

== History ==
NoLabel Sp. z o.o., founded in 2006 in Kraków, Poland, is a studio specializing in visual effects (VFX), photorealistic fluid simulation, animation, and post-production services. The studio has contributed to a diverse range of projects, including films, television series, and advertising campaigns. Led by co-founder and CEO Krzysztof Hrycak, NoLabel has worked on notable projects such as the Oscar-nominated Loving Vincent, Andrzej Wajda's Powidoki, and Netflix's Wielka Woda. The studio has also collaborated on independent films such as Kill It and Leave This Town and Magic Piano.

== Notable Projects ==
NoLabel gained widespread recognition for its work on the Netflix series Wielka Woda (High Water), where the studio was tasked with recreating the devastating 1997 flood in Wrocław. Their work on the series involved digitally simulating natural disasters, incorporating realistic water dynamics, wet surfaces, and detailed environmental integration. In 2023, in recognition of this work, the company received the Special Effects Award at the WP Teleshow Top Seriale Gala.

The studio also provided key contributions to Loving Vincent, the world's first fully hand-painted animated feature, which received international acclaim.

In 2016, NoLabel has worked on Powidoki (Afterimage), Andrzej Wajda's final film.

Additionally, NoLabel produced the film Ziegenort, which premiered at the Rotterdam Film Festival in January 2013. Since then, the film has been showcased at nearly 100 international festivals, earning multiple awards, including the Grand Prix at a Japanese festival, the Silver Lajkonik for Best Polish Animation at the Kraków Film Festival, and awards at festivals in Oberhausen, New York, and Hamburg. The film has also represented Poland at numerous prestigious animation festivals, including Annecy and Melbourne.

In 2024, NoLabel was reported to be working on Heweliusz, Netflix's largest production in Poland to date. The disaster series is set to depict a maritime catastrophe.

== Visual Effects work ==
=== Feature films ===
- 120 Bahadur (2025)
- W nich cała nadzieja (2023)
- Broad Peak (2022)
- Dziewczyny z Dubaju (2021)
- Old People (2021)
- Good Job (2020)
- Żużel (2020)
- 1800 Gramów (2019)
- Valley of the God (2019)
- Twój Vincent (2017)
- Powidoki (2016)
- Disco Polo (2015)

=== TV Series ===
- Deutsches Haus (2023)
- Die Wespe (2022 - 2023)
- Wielka Woda (2022)
- Westwall (2021)
