= Hohensaaten =

- Stadtteil of Bad Freienwalde
- Interactive map of Hohensaaten
- Location within Germany Location within Brandenburg
- Coordinates: 52°52′N 14°09′E
- Country: Germany
- State: Brandenburg
- District: Märkisch-Oderland
- Town: Bad Freienwalde

Area
  - Total: 21.90 km^{2} (8.46 sq mi)
- Elevation: 2 m (6.6 ft)

Population (2006-12-31)
  - Total: 784
  - Density: 35.8/km^{2} (92.7/sq mi)
- Time zone: UTC+01:00 (CET)
  - Summer (DST): UTC+02:00 (CEST)
- Postal codes: 16248
- Dialling codes: 033368
- Website: www.hohensaaten.de

Hohensaaten is a village and a former municipality in Brandenburg in Germany. Since 1 January 2009, it is part of the municipality Bad Freienwalde.

== History ==
Hohensaaten was first mentioned in 1258. The village belonged to Barnim district.

From 1815 to 1947, Hohensaaten was part of the Prussian Province of Brandenburg, from 1947 to 1952 of the State of Brandenburg, from 1952 to 1990 of the Bezirk Frankfurt of East Germany and since 1990 again of Brandenburg.

After a year-long dispute between municipal board and citizens, partly because of averse to the Barnim district, the treaty of mergence with city of Bad Freienwalde was signed on 14 November 2008. Since 1 January 2009, it is part of the municipality Bad Freienwalde, hence part of Märkisch-Oderland district.
