= Friedrichswalde =

- Municipality
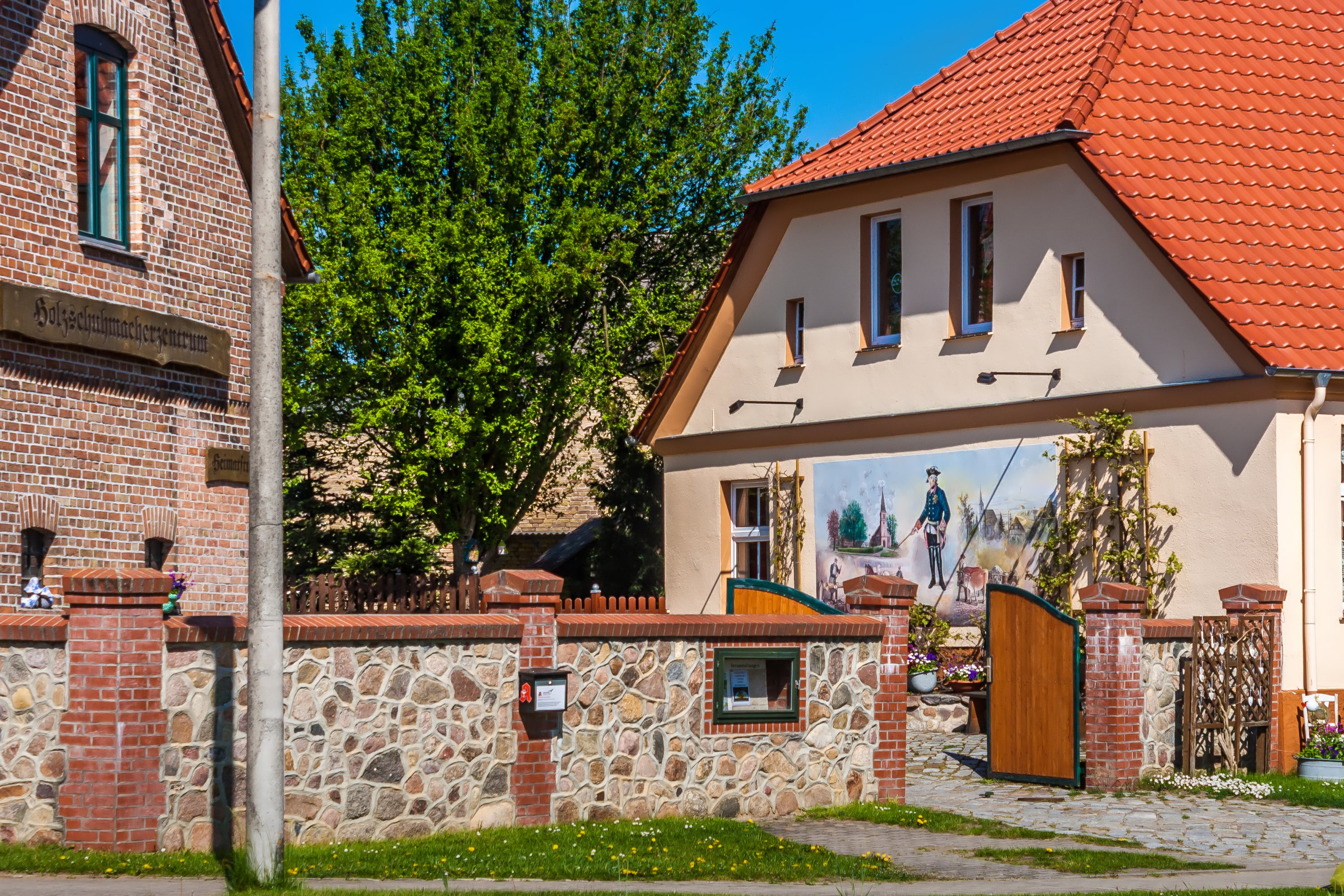
- Mural of Frederick the Great, namesake of the municipality

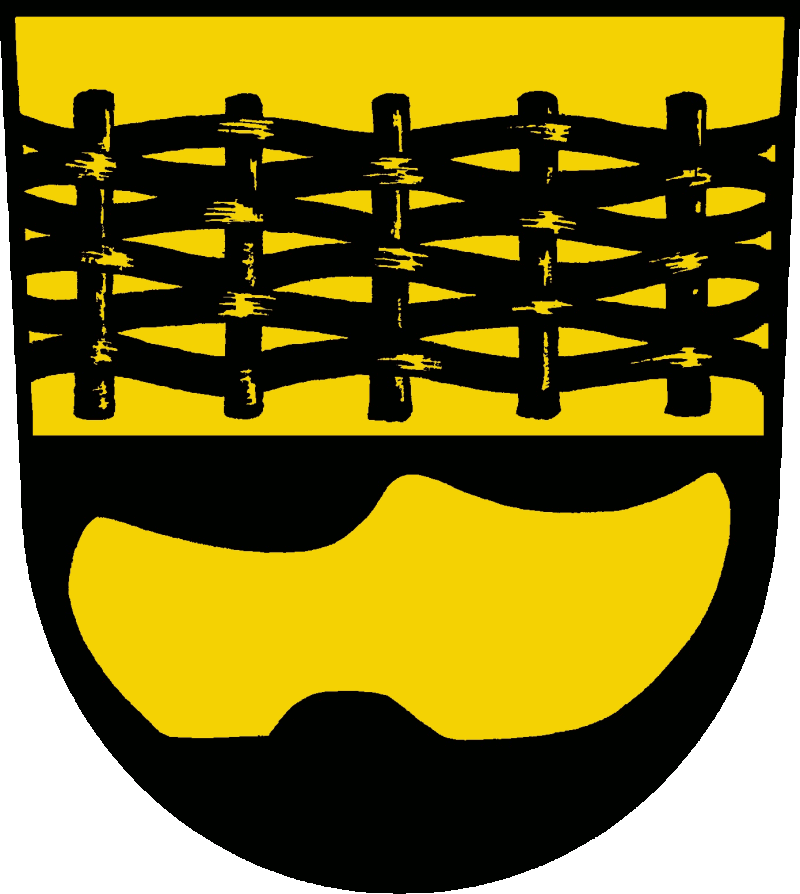
- Coat of arms

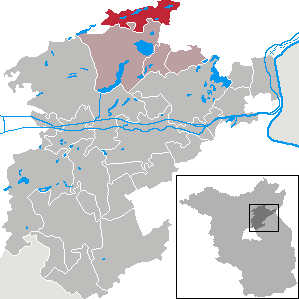
- Location of Friedrichswalde within Barnim district
- Interactive map of Friedrichswalde
- Location within Germany Location within Brandenburg
- Coordinates: 53°02′N 13°43′E
- Country: Germany
- State: Brandenburg
- District: Barnim
- Municipal assoc.: Joachimsthal (Schorfheide)
- Subdivisions: 2 Ortsteile

Government
  - Mayor (2024–29): Sven Ströbele

Area
  - Total: 45.07 km^{2} (17.40 sq mi)
- Elevation: 75 m (246 ft)

Population (2025-12-31)
  - Total: 793
  - Density: 17.6/km^{2} (45.6/sq mi)
- Time zone: UTC+01:00 (CET)
  - Summer (DST): UTC+02:00 (CEST)
- Postal codes: 16247
- Dialling codes: 033367
- Vehicle registration: BAR
- Website: www.amt-joachimsthal.de

Friedrichswalde (German pronunciation: [fʁiːdʁɪçsˈvaldə]) is a municipality in the district of Barnim in Brandenburg, Germany. It is situated in the Schorfheide nature reserve.

== History ==
From 1815 to 1947, Friedrichswalde was part of the Prussian Province of Brandenburg, from 1947 to 1952 of the State of Brandenburg, from 1952 to 1990 of the East German Bezirk Frankfurt and since 1990 again of Brandenburg.

== Demography ==
Development of population since 1875 within the current boundaries (Blue line: Population; Dotted line: Comparison to population development of Brandenburg state; Grey background: Time of Nazi rule; Red background: Time of communist rule)

Friedrichswalde: Population development
within the current boundaries (2020)

Year	Pop.	±% p.a.
1875	1,389	—
1890	1,332	−0.28%
1910	1,428	+0.35%
1925	1,481	+0.24%
1933	1,396	−0.74%
1939	1,338	−0.70%
1946	1,733	+3.76%
1950	1,839	+1.50%
1964	1,374	−2.06%
1971	1,278	−1.03%
1981	1,086	−1.61%
1985	1,033	−1.24%
1989	1,006	−0.66%
1990	970	−3.58%
1991	965	−0.52%

Year	Pop.	±% p.a.
1992	996	+3.21%
1993	901	−9.54%
1994	920	+2.11%
1995	912	−0.87%
1996	908	−0.44%
1997	890	−1.98%
1998	903	+1.46%
1999	954	+5.65%
2000	944	−1.05%
2001	950	+0.64%
2002	944	−0.63%
2003	941	−0.32%
2004	963	+2.34%
2005	965	+0.21%
2006	940	−2.59%

Year	Pop.	±% p.a.
2007	902	−4.04%
2008	894	−0.89%
2009	895	+0.11%
2010	888	−0.78%
2011	839	−5.52%
2012	844	+0.60%
2013	824	−2.37%
2014	809	−1.82%
2015	807	−0.25%
2016	801	−0.74%
2017	803	+0.25%
2018	795	−1.00%
2019	803	+1.01%
2020	809	+0.75%

== Personality ==
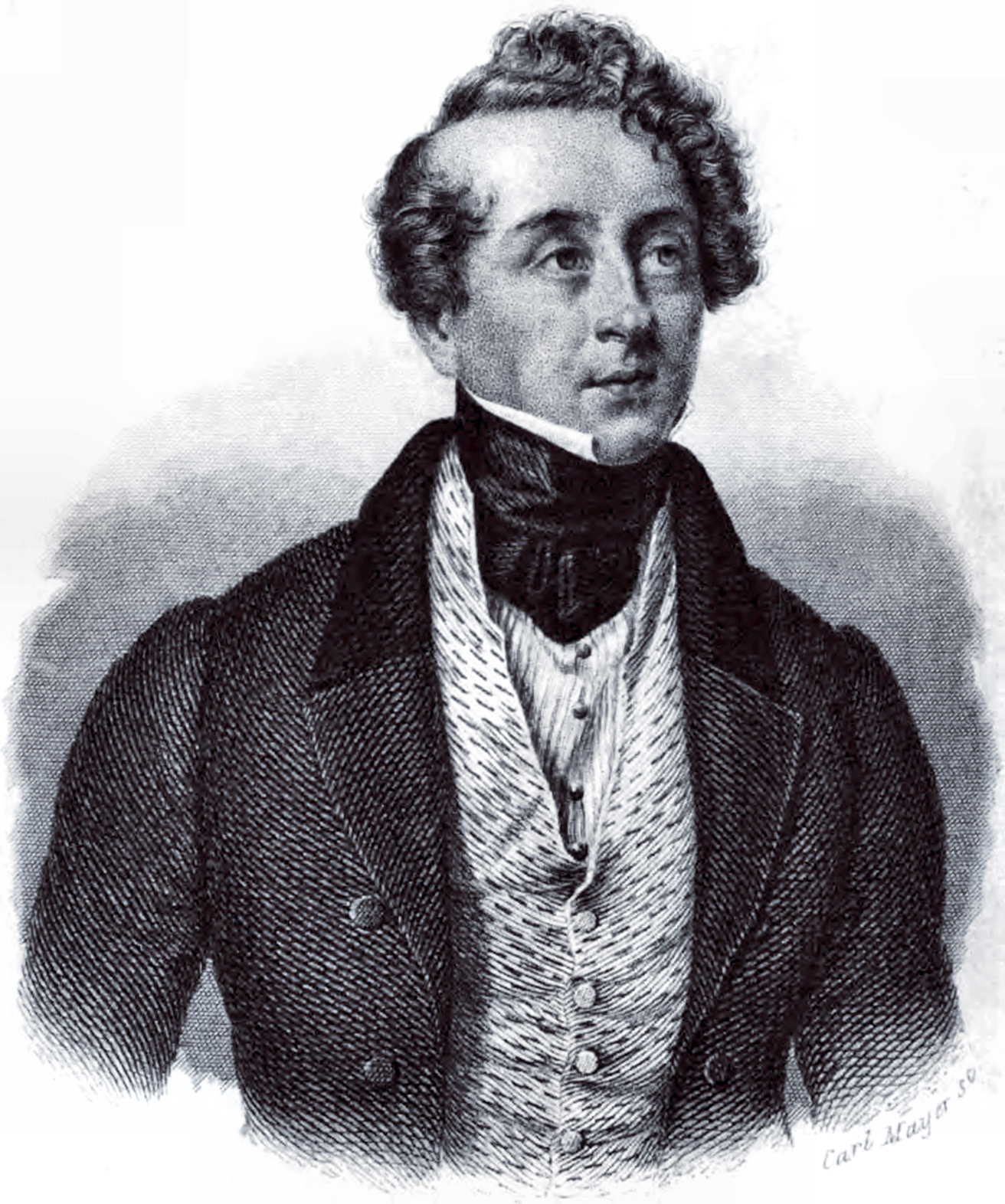
Wilhelm Friedrich Graf von Redern around 1845

- Friedrich Wilhelm von Redern (1802–1883), Prussian general manager and politician, owner of Gut Glambeck
- Paul Thränert (1875–1960), trade unionist, born in Friedrichswalde
- Bruno Endrejat (1908–1945), resistance fighter against Nazism, born in Friedrichswalde
