= Joachimsthal (Amt) =

Joachimsthal (Schorfheide)
- Amt
- Map of Barnim highlighting Joachimsthal (Schorfheide)
- Interactive map of Joachimsthal (Schorfheide)
- Location within Germany Location within Brandenburg
- Coordinates: 52°59′N 13°46′E
- Country: Germany
- State: Brandenburg
- District: Barnim
- Seat: Joachimsthal
- Subdivisions: 4 municipalities

Area
  - Total: 209.9 km^{2} (81.0 sq mi)

Population (2025-12-31)
  - Total: 5,199
  - Density: 24.77/km^{2} (64.15/sq mi)
- Time zone: UTC+01:00 (CET)
  - Summer (DST): UTC+02:00 (CEST)
- Website: www.amt-joachimsthal.de

Amt Joachimsthal (Schorfheide) is an Amt ("collective municipality") in the district of Barnim, in Brandenburg, Germany. Its seat is in the town of Joachimsthal in the Schorfheide region.

The Amt Joachimsthal consists of the following municipalities:

1. Althüttendorf
2. Friedrichswalde
3. Joachimsthal
4. Ziethen

== Demography ==
Development of Population since 1875 within the Current Boundaries (Blue Line: Population; Dotted Line: Comparison to Population Development of Brandenburg state; Grey Background: Time of Nazi rule; Red Background: Time of Communist rule)

Recent Population Development and Projections (Population Development before Census 2011 (blue line); Recent Population Development according to the Census in Germany in 2011 (blue bordered line); Official projections for 2005-2030 (yellow line); for 2014-2030 (red line); for 2017-2030 (scarlet line)

Amt Joachimsthal (Schorfheide): Population development
within the current boundaries (2020)

Year	Pop.	±% p.a.
1875	6,428	—
1890	5,729	−0.76%
1910	6,311	+0.48%
1925	6,383	+0.08%
1933	6,256	−0.25%
1939	6,428	+0.45%
1946	7,978	+3.13%
1950	8,191	+0.66%
1964	6,819	−1.30%
1971	6,487	−0.71%

Year	Pop.	±% p.a.
1981	5,759	−1.18%
1985	5,527	−1.02%
1990	5,175	−1.31%
1995	5,294	+0.46%
2000	5,647	+1.30%
2005	5,539	−0.39%
2010	5,399	−0.51%
2015	5,335	−0.24%
2020	5,276	−0.22%
2025	5,199	−0.29%
