= Grimnitzsee =

Lake in Brandenburg, Germany

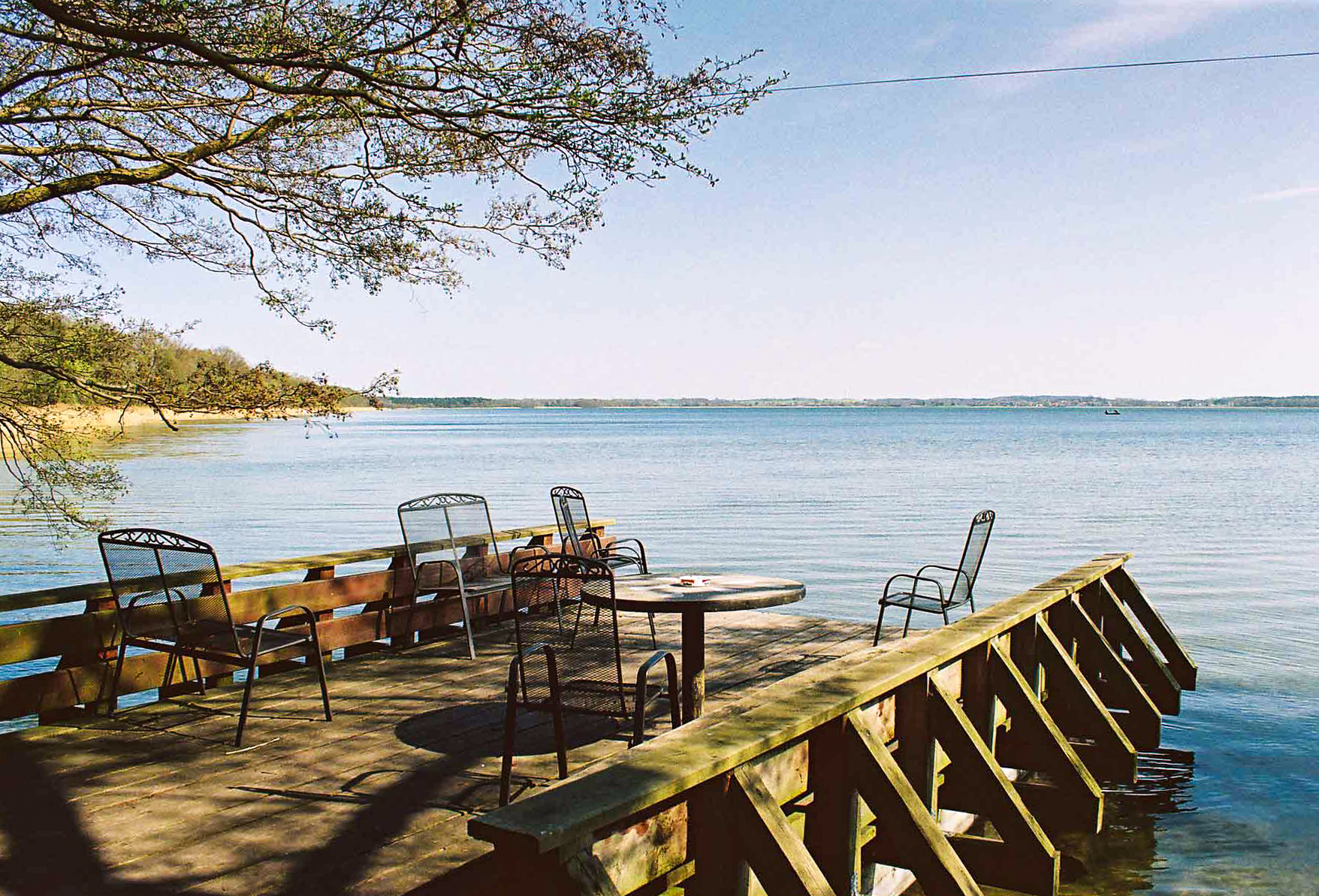

- Location within Brandenburg
- Location: Landkreis Barnim, Brandenburg
- Coordinates: 52°58′44″N 13°47′8″E
- Primary outflows: Neuer Graben
- Basin countries: Germany
- Surface area: 7.8 km^{2} (3.0 sq mi)
- Max. depth: 11 m (36 ft)
- Surface elevation: 64 m (210 ft)

Grimnitzsee (German pronunciation) is a lake in Landkreis Barnim, Brandenburg, Germany. At an elevation of 64 m, its surface area is 7.8 km^{2}. It is situated in the municipality of Joachimsthal.

== See also ==
- Lake Werbellin
