= Lake Werbellin =

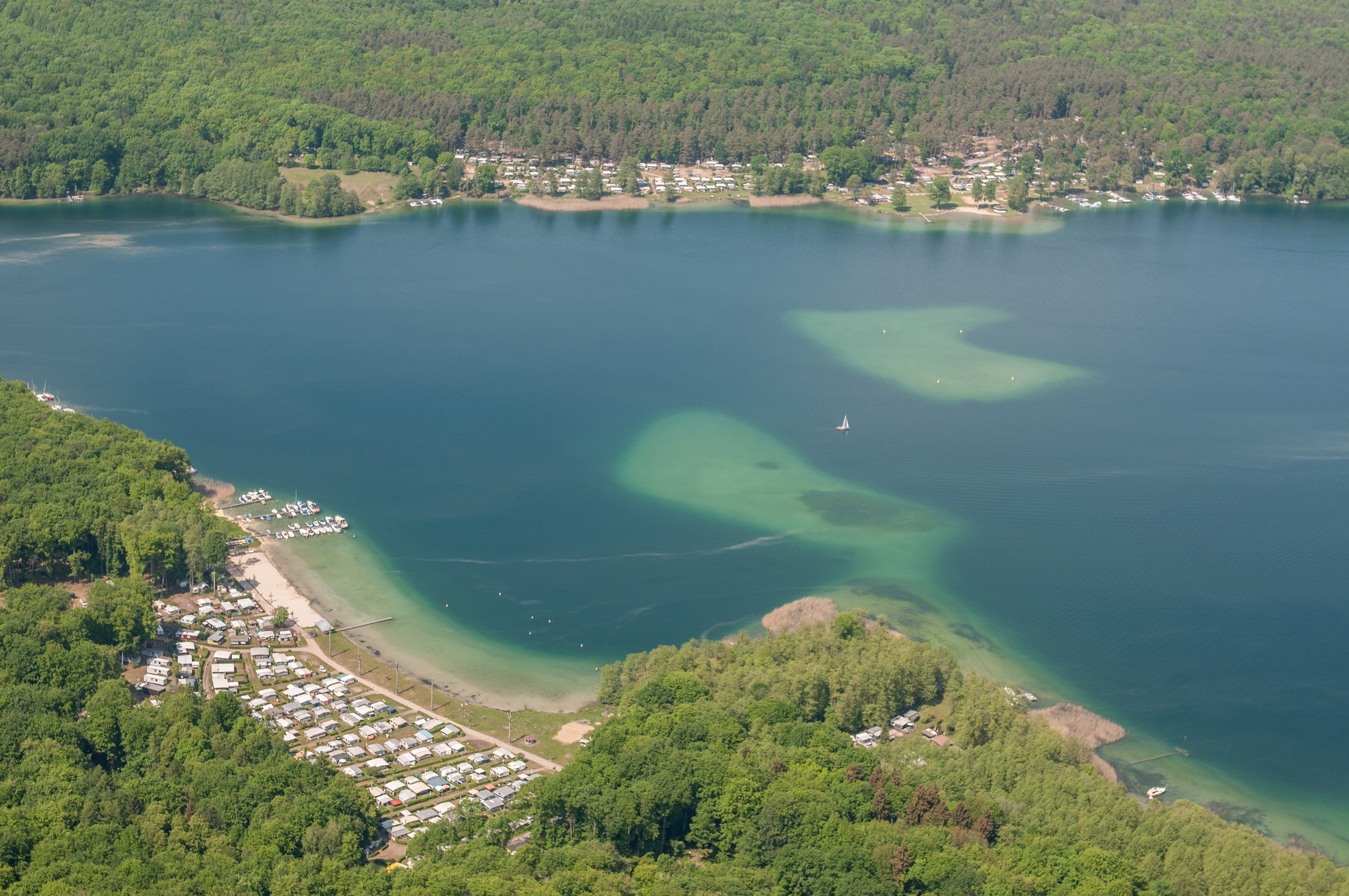

- Location within Brandenburg
- Location: Landkreis Barnim, Brandenburg
- Coordinates: 52°56′0″N 13°43′0″E
- Lake type: Glacial lake
- Primary inflows: Neuer Graben from Grimnitzsee
- Primary outflows: Werbellinkanal to Oder–Havel Canal
- Basin countries: Germany
- Max. length: 9.27 km (5.76 mi)
- Max. width: 1.2 km (0.75 mi)
- Surface area: 7.82 km^{2} (3.02 sq mi)
- Average depth: 22.1 m (73 ft)
- Max. depth: 51 meters (167 ft)
- Water volume: 0.173 km^{3} (140,000 acre⋅ft)
- Surface elevation: 64 meters (210 ft)

Lake Werbellin (German Werbellinsee) is a lake in the Barnim district of Brandenburg, Germany. It is located south of Joachimsthal in the Schorfheide-Chorin Biosphere Reserve. The southern shore belongs to the Schorfheide municipality. With a surface area of 7.82 square kilometers (3.02 sq mi) it is the fourth largest lake in Brandenburg and with 51 meters (167 ft) the second deepest (after Lake Stechlin).

== Overview ==
Werbellinsee became famous for the Hubertusstock hunting lodge on its western shore, originally built in 1849, later the resort of East German leader Erich Honecker, where he received several official guests, among them West German Chancellor Helmut Schmidt in December 1981. The eastern shore near the village of Altenhof was the site of a large Young Pioneer camp (Pionierrepublik Wilhelm Pieck).

Today the lake is a popular destination for yachtsmen and the site of several sailing regattas. It is navigable and connected with the Oder river and the Baltic Sea. The northern shore offers winding roads with few traffic disruptions, making it a popular spot for motorcycle riding.

== See also ==
- Grimnitzsee
