= Archive of Czech Television =

Archive in Prague, Brno, and Ostrava

Coordinates: 50°3′2.22″N 14°25′40.29″E

Archive and program funds of the Czech Television (Archiv a programové fondy České televize; abbreviation APF) is a specialized archive of the Czech Television. Organizationally, it is divided into three separate departments in Prague, Brno and Ostrava.

== History ==
The beginnings of the archive of Czech Television can be dated to the time of the start of trial public television broadcasting in 1953, but the storage of records, documents and materials did not expand until 1959 after the independence of television from Czechoslovak Radio. The Department of Archives and Documentation was established in Czechoslovak Television in 1962, and only in April 1965 was the archive established as an independent organizational unit. Although the main seat of the archive was the Town Hall in Prague, the depositories were almost all over the country and the archives were often not properly stored.

In 1968, the management of archives was methodically separated from the management of the materials of the television program fund. In 1971, the two departments merged again. A big advantage for the archive was the construction of the new building of the Czech Television on the Kavčí hory.

During 1997 Central European flood, part of the archive in Ostrava was damaged and the materials were transported to the Kavčí hory. According to Act 499/2004 Coll. the archive of the Czech Television is included among the specialized archives. Since 2013, the archive has been subordinated to the Department of Economics and Operations.

== Function ==
APF currently primarily manages all audiovisual recordings, including their technical preparation and distribution to recording, editing, digitizing and broadcasting workplaces. At the same time, it documents part of older audiovisual programs and recordings and sound images, and receives and catalogs documents. On a daily basis, he cooperates with creative staffs in the selection of archival samples, conducts professional research and creates a methodology for records and searches in databases. One of the main activities of the APF in recent years is the preparation and implementation of procedures for digital archiving and work with digital archive materials in the Czech Republic and the systematic digitization of historical funds.
