= Parsteiner See =

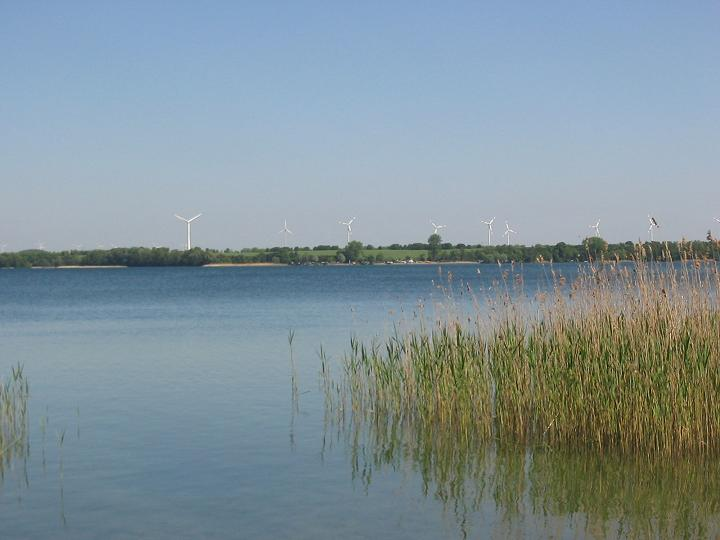

- Location within Brandenburg
- Location: Schorfheide-Chorin Biosphere Reserve, Brandenburg
- Coordinates: 52°56′1.28″N 13°58′56.25″E
- Primary outflows: Nettelgraben
- Catchment area: 150 km^{2} (58 sq mi)
- Basin countries: Germany
- Max. length: ca. 6,800 m (22,300 ft)
- Max. width: 4,000 m (13,000 ft)
- Surface area: 10.03 km^{2} (3.87 sq mi)
- Average depth: 10.0 m (32.8 ft)
- Max. depth: 31 m (102 ft)
- Water volume: 77,000,000 m^{3} (2.7×10^{9} cu ft)
- Surface elevation: 44 m (144 ft)

Parsteiner See is a lake in the Schorfheide-Chorin Biosphere Reserve in Brandenburg, Germany. At an elevation of 44 m, its surface area is 10.03 km^{2}. It is located in the municipality of Parsteinsee, Barnim district.
