= Niederfinow Boat Lift =

Coordinates: 52°50′56″N 13°56′29″E

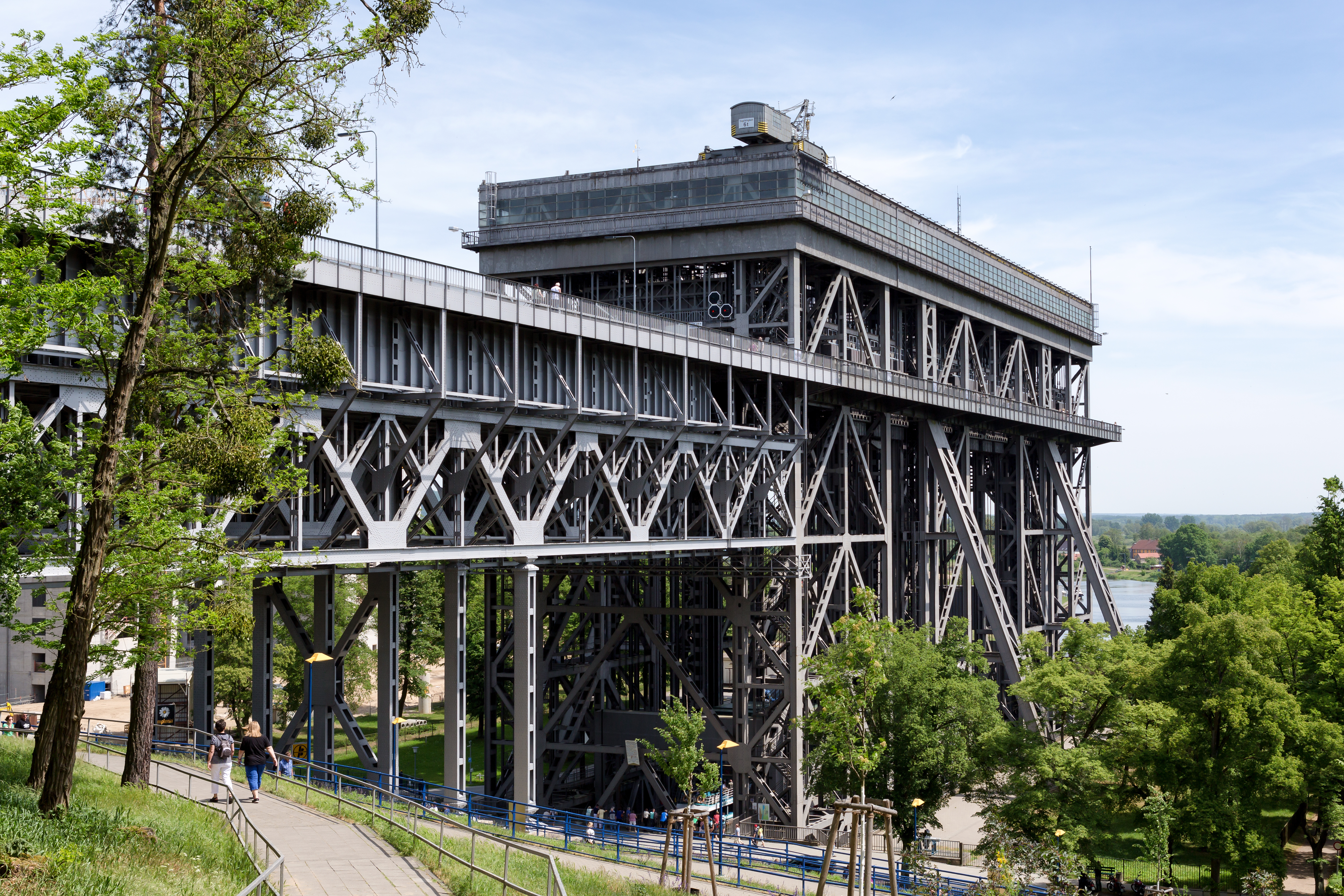
Niederfinow boat lift

The Niederfinow Boat Lift is the oldest working boat lift in Germany. It lies on the Oder-Havel Canal near Niederfinow in Brandenburg. The lift overcomes a difference in elevation of 36 metres.

== History ==
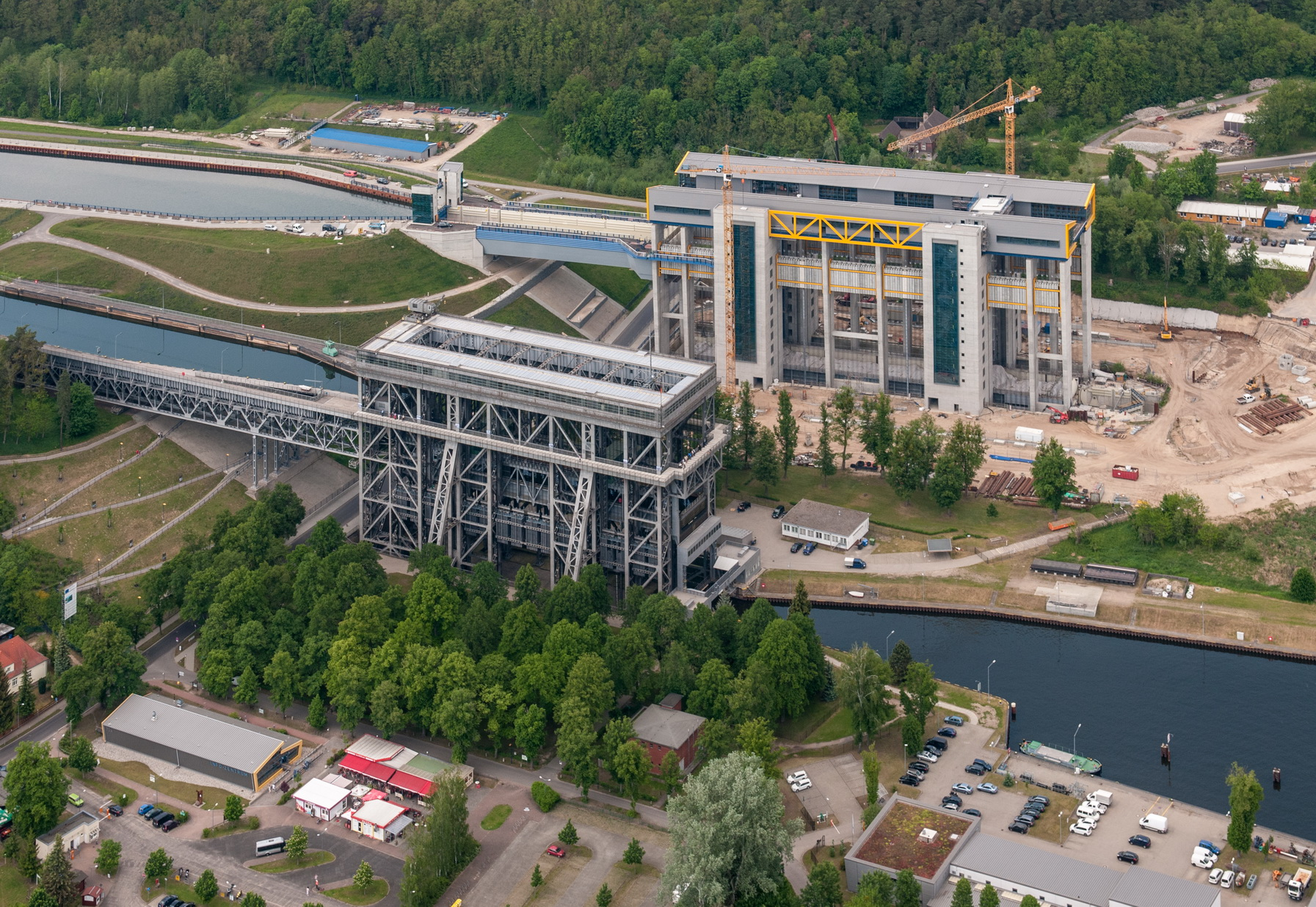
Aerial photo, with the new lift under construction in the background

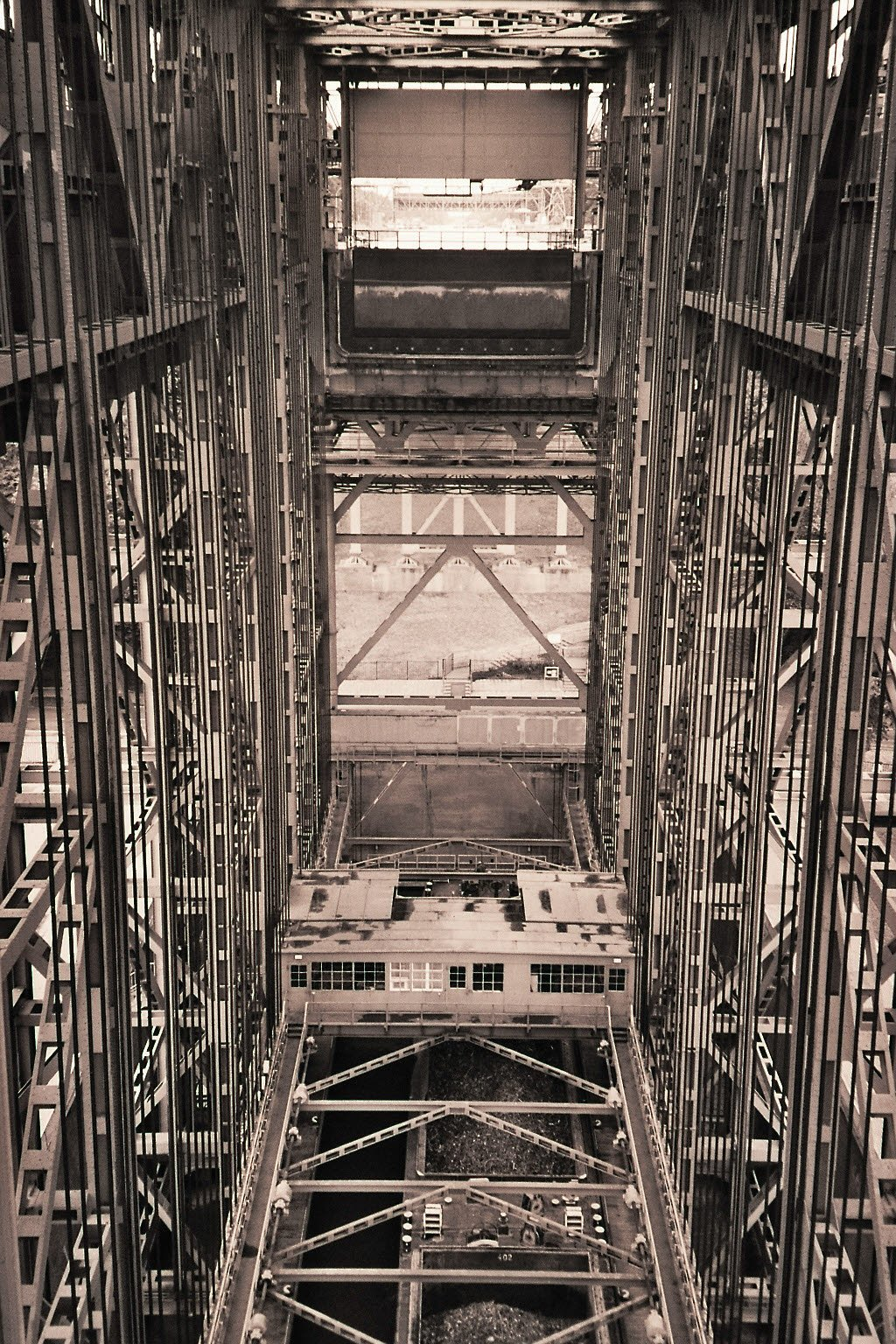
Picture from inside the lift structure

On 17 June 1914 the large navigation canal between Berlin and Stettin was opened. Near Niederfinow the difference in elevation was overcome using a staircase lock with four chambers. One can still see some remains of these locks today.

The capacity of the staircase locks was quickly exceeded, therefore, between 1927 and 1934, the boat lift was built and inaugurated on 21 March 1934. The lift is 60 m high, the length 94 m, taking five minutes for the trough to move through the 36m elevation difference. The following enterprises were involved:

Foundations

- Beton- und Monierbau AG, Berlin
- Christoph & Unmack GmbH, Berlin
- Philipp Holzmann AG, Berlin

Steel structure

- August Klönne, Dortmund
- J. Gollnow & Sohn, Stettin
- Gutehoffnungshütte AG, Oberhausen
- Mitteldeutsche Stahlwerke AG, Lauchhammer

Machinery

- Demag AG, Duisburg
- Ardeltwerke, Eberswalde
- Fried. Krupp Grusonwerk, Magdeburg

Electrical system

- Siemens-Schuckert werk, Berlin
- Allgemeine Electrizitäts-Gesellschaft, Berlin

Foundations and steel structure of the aqueduct

- Beuchelt & Co, Grünberg

By 26 January 1939 100,000 boats had already passed through the lift. In the inaugural year there was 2,832,000 tonnes of traffic.

The lift was the subject of a general overhaul in 1980 and the lifting cables were renewed in 1984/85.

Today the boat lift is too short for some barge trains which must be separated to pass the lift. The lift is running near to its capacity with about 11,000 boats passing through each year, so in 1997 the decision was made to build a new, bigger lift.

The Niederfinow lift is a popular tourist destination with about 500,000 visitors per year. Due to this a new larger car park was opened in 2003.

== Technology ==
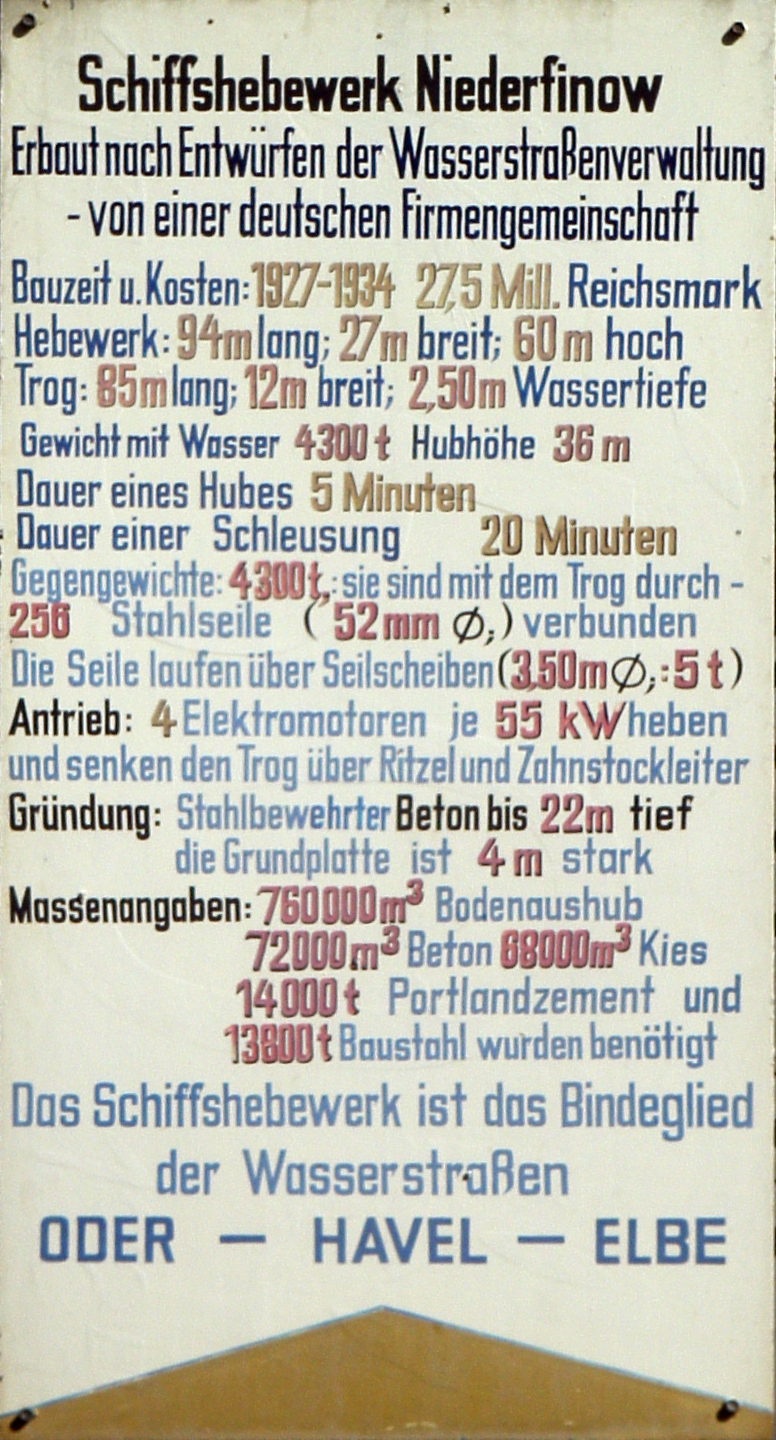
Information plaque

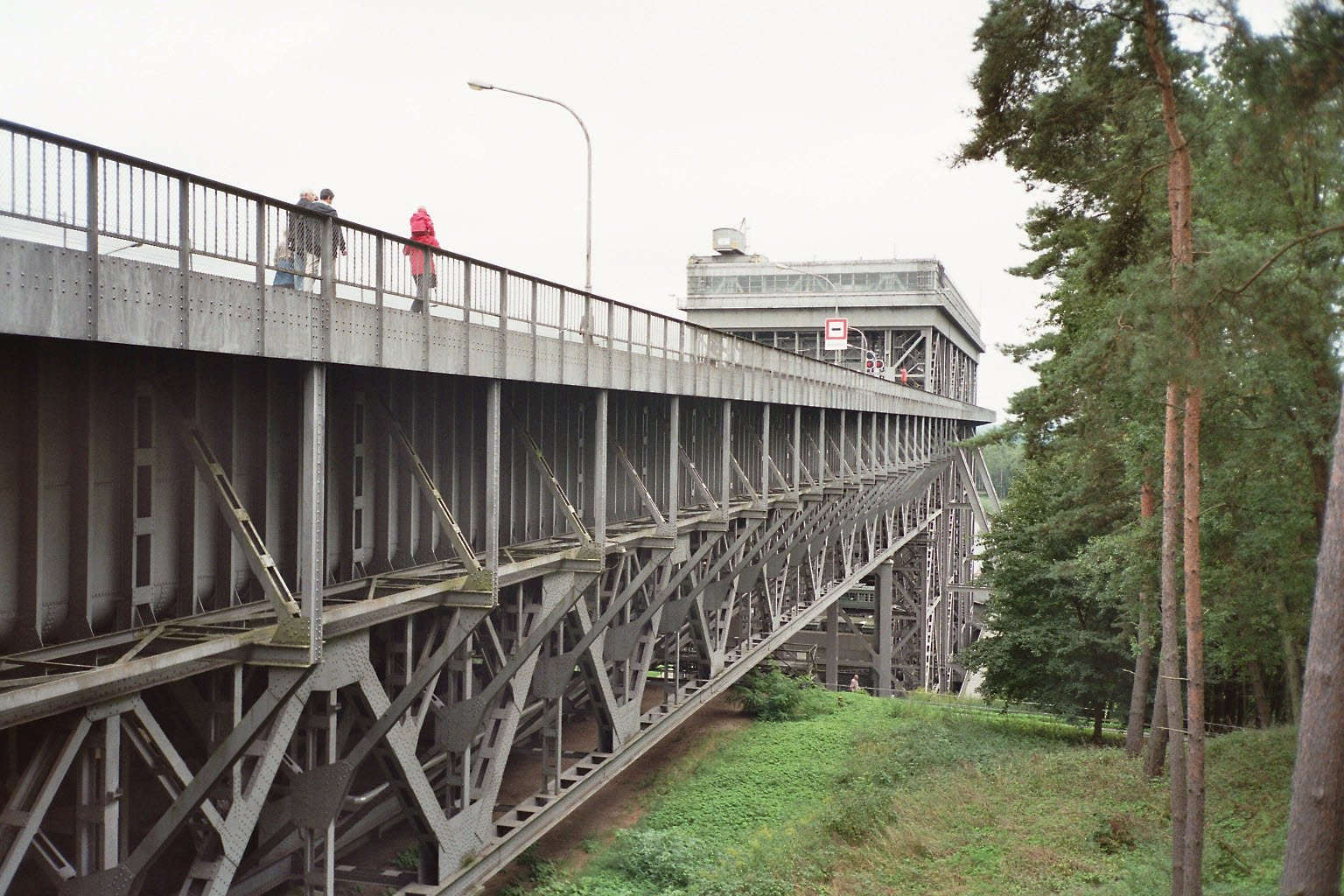
Steel construction of the upper aqueduct

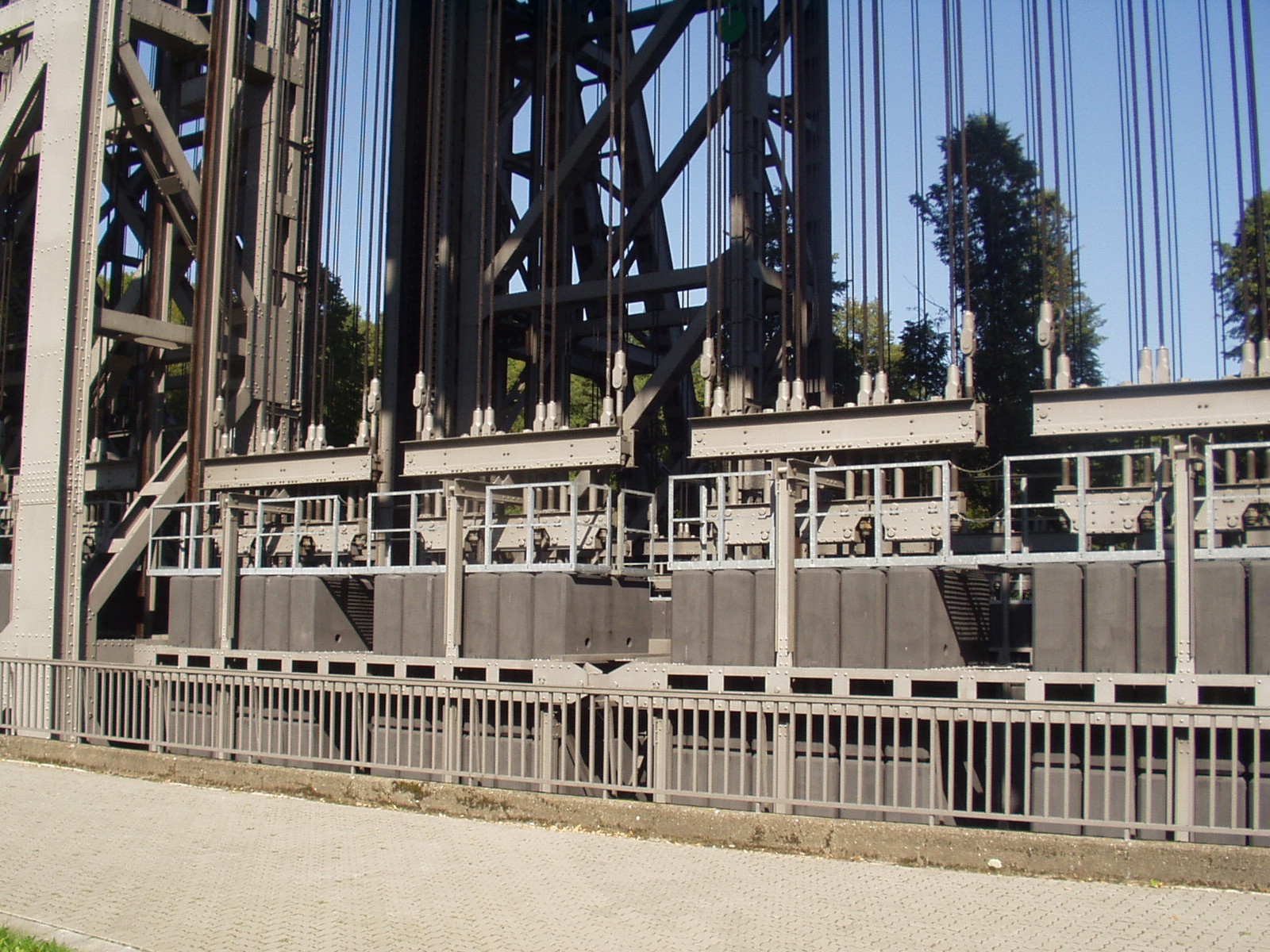
The trough counterweights

The boat lift consists of 14,000 Tonnes of riveted structural steelwork standing on steel columns. The Oder-Havel-Kanal approaches the head of the lift on a 4,000 Tonne riveted steelwork aqueduct. The trough when filled weighs 4,290 tonnes and hangs on 256 steel cables, these cross over guide rollers and support 192 counterweights which balance the trough. The security of the lift is maintained by keeping half the cables in tension and the other half relaxed in reserve. The guide rollers have a diameter of 3.5m.

Pin gearing with D.C.motors in Leonards electric motor speed controllers, connected together by a shaft allow a symmetrical drive. This arrangement allows the exact synchronisation of the four pin gears. The four Leonard controllers each have an output of 55 kilowatts totalling 220 kilowatts. Four worm geared shafts are driven which intersect with internal threads built into the troughs. These move freely under normal circumstances but would seize if a cable broke providing extra safety.

== New boat lift ==
Because of the continuing increase in traffic on the Oder-Havel-Kanal, in 1997 it was decided that a new, bigger lift should be built next to the present one. Earthworks between the lift and the old staircase locks began in autumn of 2006. The new lift, which was built by Bilfinger Berger and developed in partnership with Johann Bunte, was finished in October 2022.

The trough is 125.5 metres (412 ft) long and 15 metres (49 ft) wide and weighs 2,785 tonnes (3,070 tons)—and some 9,800 tonnes (10,800 tons) when filled with water. It has usable inner dimensions of 115 metres (126 yd) length × 12.5 metres (41 ft) breadth × 4.0 metres (13.1 ft) water depth. The final cost was 520 million euros, almost twice as much as originally planned. The old lift will remain in use however until at least 2030.
