= Joachimsthal, Brandenburg =

Joachimsthal
- Town
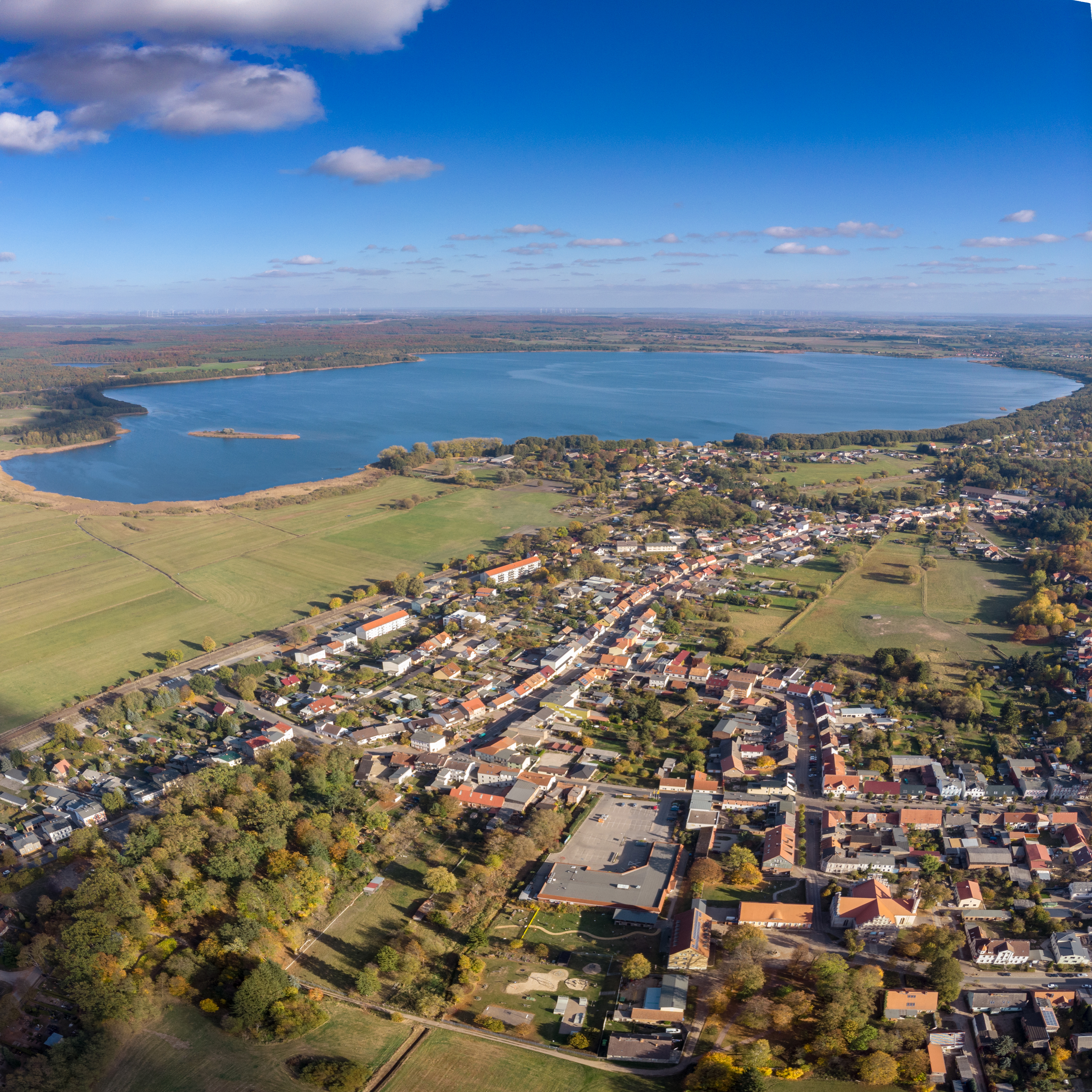

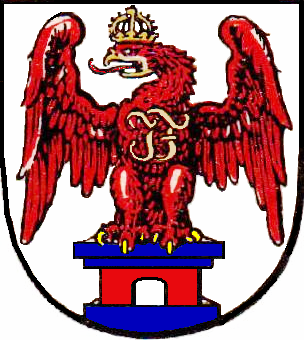
- Coat of arms

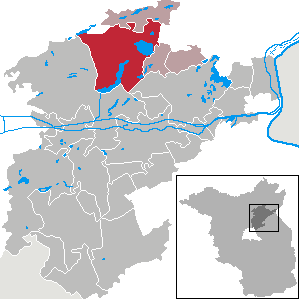
- Location of Joachimsthal within Barnim district
- Interactive map of Joachimsthal
- Location within Germany Location within Brandenburg
- Coordinates: 52°58′N 13°45′E
- Country: Germany
- State: Brandenburg
- District: Barnim
- Municipal assoc.: Joachimsthal (Schorfheide)

Government
  - Mayor (2024–29): René Knaak-Reichstein (CDU)

Area
  - Total: 121.68 km^{2} (46.98 sq mi)
- Elevation: 72 m (236 ft)

Population (2025-12-31)
  - Total: 3,303
  - Density: 27.14/km^{2} (70.31/sq mi)
- Time zone: UTC+01:00 (CET)
  - Summer (DST): UTC+02:00 (CEST)
- Postal codes: 16247
- Dialling codes: 033361
- Vehicle registration: BAR
- Website: www.joachimsthal.de

Joachimsthal (German pronunciation: [joˈʔaxɪmsˌtaːl]) is a small town in the district of Barnim, in Brandenburg, Germany. It is situated within the Schorfheide-Chorin Biosphere Reserve on the isthmus between the lakes Grimnitzsee in the north and Werbellinsee in the south, about 17 km (11 mi) northwest of the district's capital Eberswalde and 55 km (34 mi) northeast of the Berlin city centre. The municipality is the administrative seat of the Amt ("collective municipality") Amt Joachimsthal.

== History ==
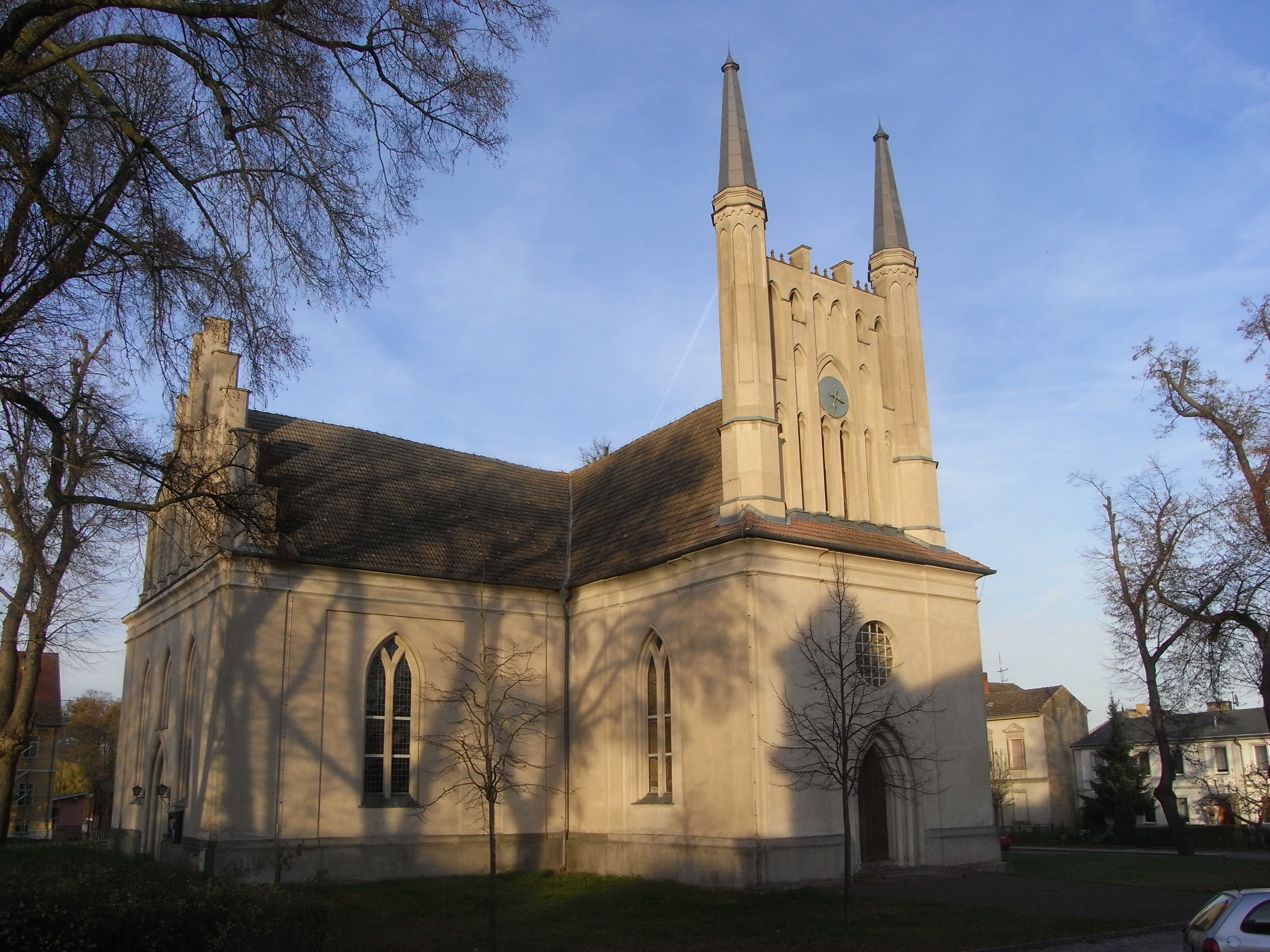
Church of the Cross

Joachimsthal was founded in 1601 by Elector Joachim III Frederick of Brandenburg at the foot of medieval Grimnitz Castle and received town privileges in 1604. The Elector had a glass foundry erected and in 1607 established a boarding school, the Joachimsthalsches Gymnasium, that was relocated to Berlin after its devastation in 1636 during the Thirty Years' War. After a blaze in 1814, the church and several houses were rebuilt according to plans by Karl Friedrich Schinkel.

From 1815 to 1947, Joachimstal was part of the Prussian Province of Brandenburg. King Frederick William IV of Prussia had the Hubertusstock hunting lodge erected on the western shore of the Werbellinsee in 1849. Through changing times, Hubertusstock served as a pleasure ground for men in power: The German Emperors from the House of Hohenzollern indulged in huntsmanship (Wilhelm II had his own train station built), as did the Presidents of the Weimar Republic, Friedrich Ebert and Paul von Hindenburg. In 1944 Adolf Hitler gave the lodge to Obergruppenführer Hans Lammers and in 1973 it was rebuilt as a vacation home for General Secretary Erich Honecker.

From 1947 to 1952, Joachimstal was part of the State of Brandenburg, from 1952 to 1990 of the East German Bezirk Frankfurt and since 1990 again of Brandenburg.

== Twin town ==
- Golczewo, Poland

== Demography ==
Development of population since 1875 within the current boundaries (Blue line: Population; Dotted line: Comparison to population development of Brandenburg state; Grey background: Time of Nazi rule; Red background: Time of communist rule)

Joachimsthal: Population development
within the current boundaries (2020)

Year	Pop.	±% p.a.
1875	3,027	—
1890	2,723	−0.70%
1910	3,068	+0.60%
1925	3,149	+0.17%
1933	3,145	−0.02%
1939	3,390	+1.26%
1946	4,105	+2.77%
1950	4,194	+0.54%
1964	3,789	−0.72%
1971	3,619	−0.65%
1981	3,425	−0.55%
1985	3,273	−1.13%
1989	3,127	−1.13%
1990	3,087	−1.28%
1991	3,035	−1.68%

Year	Pop.	±% p.a.
1992	3,162	+4.18%
1993	3,148	−0.44%
1994	3,073	−2.38%
1995	3,117	+1.43%
1996	3,203	+2.76%
1997	3,390	+5.84%
1998	3,461	+2.09%
1999	3,476	+0.43%
2000	3,448	−0.81%
2001	3,419	−0.84%
2002	3,448	+0.85%
2003	3,454	+0.17%
2004	3,388	−1.91%
2005	3,349	−1.15%
2006	3,368	+0.57%

Year	Pop.	±% p.a.
2007	3,357	−0.33%
2008	3,292	−1.94%
2009	3,271	−0.64%
2010	3,303	+0.98%
2011	3,297	−0.18%
2012	3,311	+0.42%
2013	3,375	+1.93%
2014	3,352	−0.68%
2015	3,465	+3.37%
2016	3,446	−0.55%
2017	3,373	−2.12%
2018	3,419	+1.36%
2019	3,405	−0.41%
2020	3,414	+0.26%

== See also ==
- Grimnitzsee
- Werbellinsee

== Notable people ==
=== Sons and daughters ===
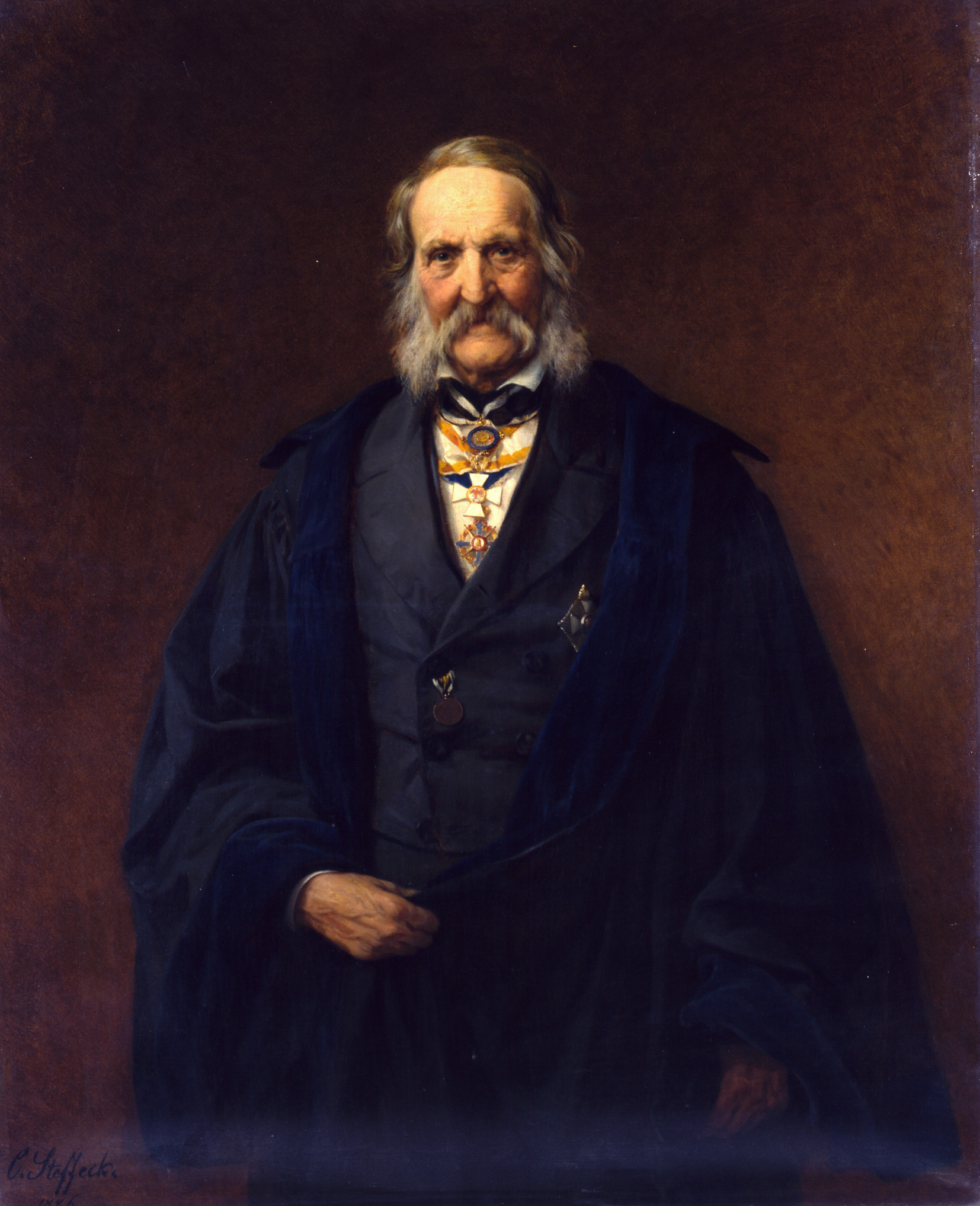
Franz Ernst Neumann

- Franz Ernst Neumann (1798–1895), physicist

=== Honorary citizen ===
The first honorary citizen (1951) was S. K. Thoden van Velzen (1870-1957), who worked as a doctor in the town. In the last days of the Second World War, he prevented the destruction of the town, with a white flag of the approaching Red Army.

=== Persons associated with Joachimsthal ===
- Friedrich Brunold (1811-1894), Brandenburg writer, died in Joachimsthal
