= Liepe =

- Municipality
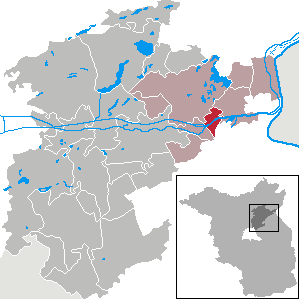
- Location of Liepe within Barnim district
- Interactive map of Liepe
- Location within Germany Location within Brandenburg
- Coordinates: 52°52′00″N 13°58′00″E
- Country: Germany
- State: Brandenburg
- District: Barnim
- Municipal assoc.: Britz-Chorin-Oderberg

Government
  - Mayor (2024–29): Nicole Schwarz

Area
  - Total: 10.85 km^{2} (4.19 sq mi)
- Elevation: 10 m (33 ft)

Population (2025-12-31)
  - Total: 600
  - Density: 55/km^{2} (140/sq mi)
- Time zone: UTC+01:00 (CET)
  - Summer (DST): UTC+02:00 (CEST)
- Postal codes: 16248
- Dialling codes: 033362
- Vehicle registration: BAR
- Website: www.liepe-barnim.de

Liepe (German pronunciation: [ˈliːpə]) is a municipality in the district of Barnim in Brandenburg in Germany.

== History ==
From 1815 to 1947, Liepe was part of the Prussian Province of Brandenburg, from 1947 to 1952 of the State of Brandenburg, from 1952 to 1990 of the East German Bezirk Frankfurt and since 1990 again of Brandenburg.

== Demography ==
Development of population since 1875 within the current boundaries (Blue line: Population; Dotted line: Comparison to population development of Brandenburg state; Grey background: Time of Nazi rule; Red background: Time of communist rule)

Liepe: Population development
within the current boundaries (2020)

Year	Pop.	±% p.a.
1875	1,881	—
1890	1,999	+0.41%
1910	1,741	−0.69%
1925	1,264	−2.11%
1933	1,238	−0.26%
1939	1,286	+0.64%
1946	1,517	+2.39%
1950	1,478	−0.65%
1964	1,271	−1.07%
1971	1,195	−0.88%
1981	980	−1.96%
1985	885	−2.52%
1989	834	−1.47%
1990	814	−2.40%
1991	801	−1.60%

Year	Pop.	±% p.a.
1992	773	−3.50%
1993	766	−0.91%
1994	757	−1.17%
1995	783	+3.43%
1996	808	+3.19%
1997	802	−0.74%
1998	800	−0.25%
1999	805	+0.63%
2000	807	+0.25%
2001	807	+0.00%
2002	803	−0.50%
2003	802	−0.12%
2004	795	−0.87%
2005	787	−1.01%
2006	766	−2.67%

Year	Pop.	±% p.a.
2007	772	+0.78%
2008	766	−0.78%
2009	757	−1.17%
2010	753	−0.53%
2011	685	−9.03%
2012	692	+1.02%
2013	677	−2.17%
2014	646	−4.58%
2015	647	+0.15%
2016	635	−1.85%
2017	643	+1.26%
2018	655	+1.87%
2019	653	−0.31%
2020	636	−2.60%
