= Lunow-Stolzenhagen =

- Municipality
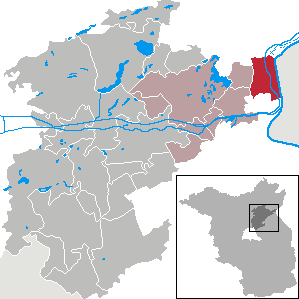
- Location of Lunow-Stolzenhagen within Barnim district
- Interactive map of Lunow-Stolzenhagen
- Location within Germany Location within Brandenburg
- Coordinates: 52°56′00″N 14°06′30″E
- Country: Germany
- State: Brandenburg
- District: Barnim
- Municipal assoc.: Britz-Chorin-Oderberg
- Subdivisions: 2 Ortsteile

Government
  - Mayor (2024–29): Andrea von Cysewski

Area
  - Total: 33.91 km^{2} (13.09 sq mi)
- Elevation: 3 m (9.8 ft)

Population (2025-12-31)
  - Total: 1,136
  - Density: 33.50/km^{2} (86.77/sq mi)
- Time zone: UTC+01:00 (CET)
  - Summer (DST): UTC+02:00 (CEST)
- Postal codes: 16248
- Dialling codes: 033365
- Vehicle registration: BAR
- Website: www.amt-oderberg.de

Lunow-Stolzenhagen (German pronunciation: [ˈluːnoː ʃtɔltsn̩ˈhaːɡn̩]) is a municipality in the district of Barnim in Brandenburg in Germany.

== History ==
The municipality of Lunow-Stolzenhagen was formed on 1 March 2002 by merging the municipalities of Lunow and Stolzenhagen.

From 1815 to 1947, Lunow and Stolzenhagen were part of the Prussian Province of Brandenburg, from 1947 to 1952 of the State of Brandenburg, from 1952 to 1990 of the East German Bezirk Frankfurt and since 1990 again of Brandenburg, since 2002 united as the municipality of Lunow-Stolzenhagen.

== Demography ==
Development of population since 1875 within the current boundaries (Blue line: Population; Dotted line: Comparison to population development of Brandenburg state; Grey background: Time of Nazi rule; Red background: Time of communist rule)

Lunow-Stolzenhagen: Population development
within the current boundaries (2020)

Year	Pop.	±% p.a.
1875	1,696	—
1890	1,786	+0.35%
1910	1,806	+0.06%
1925	1,793	−0.05%
1933	1,827	+0.24%
1939	1,870	+0.39%
1946	2,350	+3.32%
1950	2,521	+1.77%
1964	1,980	−1.71%
1971	1,862	−0.87%
1981	1,563	−1.74%
1985	1,484	−1.29%
1989	1,430	−0.92%
1990	1,410	−1.40%
1991	1,358	−3.69%

Year	Pop.	±% p.a.
1992	1,332	−1.91%
1993	1,310	−1.65%
1994	1,308	−0.15%
1995	1,292	−1.22%
1996	1,307	+1.16%
1997	1,312	+0.38%
1998	1,311	−0.08%
1999	1,327	+1.22%
2000	1,311	−1.21%
2001	1,304	−0.53%
2002	1,286	−1.38%
2003	1,257	−2.26%
2004	1,239	−1.43%
2005	1,219	−1.61%
2006	1,209	−0.82%

Year	Pop.	±% p.a.
2007	1,234	+2.07%
2008	1,211	−1.86%
2009	1,203	−0.66%
2010	1,194	−0.75%
2011	1,219	+2.09%
2012	1,218	−0.08%
2013	1,196	−1.81%
2014	1,206	+0.84%
2015	1,208	+0.17%
2016	1,202	−0.50%
2017	1,206	+0.33%
2018	1,216	+0.83%
2019	1,205	−0.90%
2020	1,185	−1.66%
