= Britz (surname) =

Britz is the surname of the following people

- Bernhard Britz (1906–1935), Swedish cyclist
- Boetie Britz (born 1987), South African rugby union player
- Chuck Britz (1927–2000), American recording engineer
- David Britz (born 1980), American scientist and engineer
- Gerrie Britz (born 1978), South African former rugby union player
- Greg Britz (born 1961), American ice hockey player
- Iafa Britz (born 1971), Brazilian film producer and screenwriter
- Jerilyn Britz (born 1943), American professional golfer
- Tienie Britz (born 1945), South African golfer
- Willie Britz (born 1988), South African rugby union player
