= Britz-Chorin-Oderberg =

Municipality in Brandenburg, Germany

- Amt
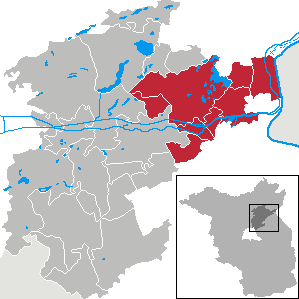
- Map of Barnim highlighting Britz-Chorin-Oderberg
- Interactive map of Britz-Chorin-Oderberg
- Location within Germany Location within Brandenburg
- Coordinates: 52°46′N 13°44′E
- Country: Germany
- State: Brandenburg
- District: Barnim
- Seat: Britz
- Subdivisions: 8 municipalities

Area
  - Total: 270.63 km^{2} (104.49 sq mi)

Population (2025-12-31)
  - Total: 9,612
  - Density: 35.52/km^{2} (91.99/sq mi)
- Time zone: UTC+01:00 (CET)
  - Summer (DST): UTC+02:00 (CEST)
- Website: britz-chorin-oderberg.de

Amt Britz-Chorin-Oderberg is an Amt ("collective municipality") in the district of Barnim, in Brandenburg, Germany. Its seat is in the town Britz. It was formed on 1 January 2009 by the merger of the former Ämter Britz-Chorin and Oderberg.

The Amt Britz-Chorin-Oderberg consists of the following municipalities:

1. Britz
2. Chorin
3. Hohenfinow
4. Liepe
5. Lunow-Stolzenhagen
6. Niederfinow
7. Oderberg
8. Parsteinsee

== Demography ==
Development of Population since 1875 within the Current Boundaries (Blue Line: Population; Dotted Line: Comparison to Population Development of Brandenburg state; Grey Background: Time of Nazi rule; Red Background: Time of Communist rule)

Recent Population Development and Projections (Population Development before Census 2011 (blue line); Recent Population Development according to the Census in Germany in 2011 (blue bordered line); Official projections for 2005-2030 (yellow line); for 2014-2030 (red line); for 2017-2030 (scarlet line)

Amt Britz-Chorin-Oderberg: Population development
within the current boundaries (2020)

Year	Pop.	±% p.a.
1875	15,219	—
1890	15,947	+0.31%
1910	15,658	−0.09%
1925	14,917	−0.32%
1933	15,394	+0.39%
1939	16,041	+0.69%
1946	18,100	+1.74%
1950	18,751	+0.89%
1964	16,195	−1.04%
1971	15,633	−0.50%

Year	Pop.	±% p.a.
1981	13,157	−1.71%
1985	12,473	−1.33%
1990	11,840	−1.04%
1995	11,476	−0.62%
2000	11,768	+0.50%
2005	11,131	−1.11%
2010	10,357	−1.43%
2015	10,157	−0.39%
2020	10,148	−0.02%
2025	9,612	−1.08%
