= Parsteinsee =

- Municipality
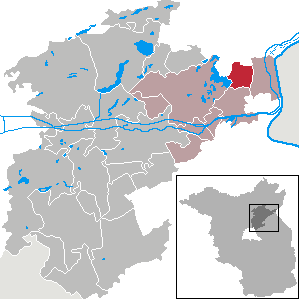
- Location of Parsteinsee within Barnim district
- Interactive map of Parsteinsee
- Location within Germany Location within Brandenburg
- Coordinates: 52°56′0″N 14°03′00″E
- Country: Germany
- State: Brandenburg
- District: Barnim
- Municipal assoc.: Britz-Chorin-Oderberg
- Subdivisions: 2 Ortsteile

Government
  - Mayor (2024–29): Michael Stürmer

Area
  - Total: 17.06 km^{2} (6.59 sq mi)
- Elevation: 60 m (200 ft)

Population (2025-12-31)
  - Total: 500
  - Density: 29/km^{2} (76/sq mi)
- Time zone: UTC+01:00 (CET)
  - Summer (DST): UTC+02:00 (CEST)
- Postal codes: 16248
- Dialling codes: 033365
- Vehicle registration: BAR

Parsteinsee (German pronunciation: [ˈpaːɐ̯ʃtaɪnˌzeː]) is a municipality in the district of Barnim in Brandenburg in Germany.

== History ==
The municipality of Parsteinsee was formed in 2002 by merging the municipalities of Parstein and Lüdersdorf.

From 1815 to 1945, the constituent localities of Parsteinsee were part of the Prussian Province of Brandenburg, from 1945 to 1952 of the State of Brandenburg, from 1952 to 1990 of the East German Bezirk Frankfurt and since 1990 again of Brandenburg.

== Demography ==
Development of population since 1875 within the current boundaries (Blue line: Population; Dotted line: Comparison to population development of Brandenburg state; Grey background: Time of Nazi rule; Red background: Time of communist rule)

Parsteinsee: Population development
within the current boundaries (2020)

Year	Pop.	±% p.a.
1875	1,050	—
1890	962	−0.58%
1910	945	−0.09%
1925	1,021	+0.52%
1933	964	−0.72%
1939	890	−1.32%
1946	1,179	+4.10%
1950	1,263	+1.74%
1964	1,021	−1.51%
1971	913	−1.58%
1981	689	−2.78%
1985	707	+0.65%
1989	675	−1.15%
1990	664	−1.63%
1991	636	−4.22%

Year	Pop.	±% p.a.
1992	630	−0.94%
1993	651	+3.33%
1994	632	−2.92%
1995	625	−1.11%
1996	615	−1.60%
1997	633	+2.93%
1998	626	−1.11%
1999	626	+0.00%
2000	616	−1.60%
2001	597	−3.08%
2002	596	−0.17%
2003	593	−0.50%
2004	572	−3.54%
2005	574	+0.35%
2006	557	−2.96%

Year	Pop.	±% p.a.
2007	542	−2.69%
2008	552	+1.85%
2009	534	−3.26%
2010	557	+4.31%
2011	556	−0.18%
2012	545	−1.98%
2013	543	−0.37%
2014	552	+1.66%
2015	556	+0.72%
2016	541	−2.70%
2017	542	+0.18%
2018	538	−0.74%
2019	561	+4.28%
2020	547	−2.50%

== See also ==
- Parsteiner See
