= Niederfinow =

- Municipality
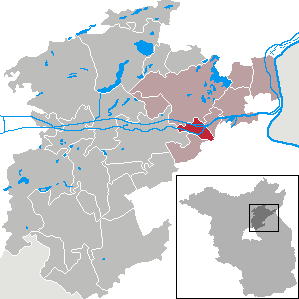
- Location of Niederfinow within Barnim district
- Interactive map of Niederfinow
- Location within Germany Location within Brandenburg
- Coordinates: 52°50′N 13°56′E
- Country: Germany
- State: Brandenburg
- District: Barnim
- Municipal assoc.: Britz-Chorin-Oderberg

Government
  - Mayor (2024–29): Peggy Fürst

Area
  - Total: 13.29 km^{2} (5.13 sq mi)
- Elevation: 2 m (6.6 ft)

Population (2025-12-31)
  - Total: 590
  - Density: 44/km^{2} (110/sq mi)
- Time zone: UTC+01:00 (CET)
  - Summer (DST): UTC+02:00 (CEST)
- Postal codes: 16248
- Dialling codes: 033362
- Vehicle registration: BAR
- Website: Amt Britz-Chorin

Niederfinow (German pronunciation: [niːdɐˈfiːnoː]) is a municipality in the district of Barnim in Brandenburg in Germany.

== History ==
From 1815 to 1947, Niederfinow was part of the Prussian Province of Brandenburg, from 1947 to 1952 of the State of Brandenburg, from 1952 to 1990 of the Bezirk Frankfurt of East Germany and since 1990 again of Brandenburg.

== Landmarks ==
In Niederfinow stands the Niederfinow Boat Lift complex, covering a height difference of 36 meters in the Oder-Havel Canal.

== Demography ==
Development of population since 1875 within the current boundaries (Blue line: Population; Dotted line: Comparison to population development of Brandenburg state; Grey background: Time of Nazi rule; Red background: Time of communist rule)

Niederfinow: Population development
within the current boundaries (2020)

Year	Pop.	±% p.a.
1875	1,336	—
1890	1,551	+1.00%
1910	1,625	+0.23%
1925	1,386	−1.05%
1933	1,585	+1.69%
1939	1,564	−0.22%
1946	1,517	−0.43%
1950	1,484	−0.55%
1964	1,176	−1.65%
1971	1,099	−0.96%
1981	849	−2.55%
1985	795	−1.63%
1989	704	−2.99%
1990	673	−4.40%
1991	670	−0.45%

Year	Pop.	±% p.a.
1992	681	+1.64%
1993	639	−6.17%
1994	642	+0.47%
1995	634	−1.25%
1996	646	+1.89%
1997	681	+5.42%
1998	706	+3.67%
1999	703	−0.42%
2000	701	−0.28%
2001	682	−2.71%
2002	674	−1.17%
2003	663	−1.63%
2004	645	−2.71%
2005	647	+0.31%
2006	654	+1.08%

Year	Pop.	±% p.a.
2007	638	−2.45%
2008	610	−4.39%
2009	612	+0.33%
2010	632	+3.27%
2011	603	−4.59%
2012	619	+2.65%
2013	628	+1.45%
2014	610	−2.87%
2015	619	+1.48%
2016	599	−3.23%
2017	605	+1.00%
2018	595	−1.65%
2019	590	−0.84%
2020	613	+3.90%
