= Britz, Brandenburg =

Britz
- Municipality
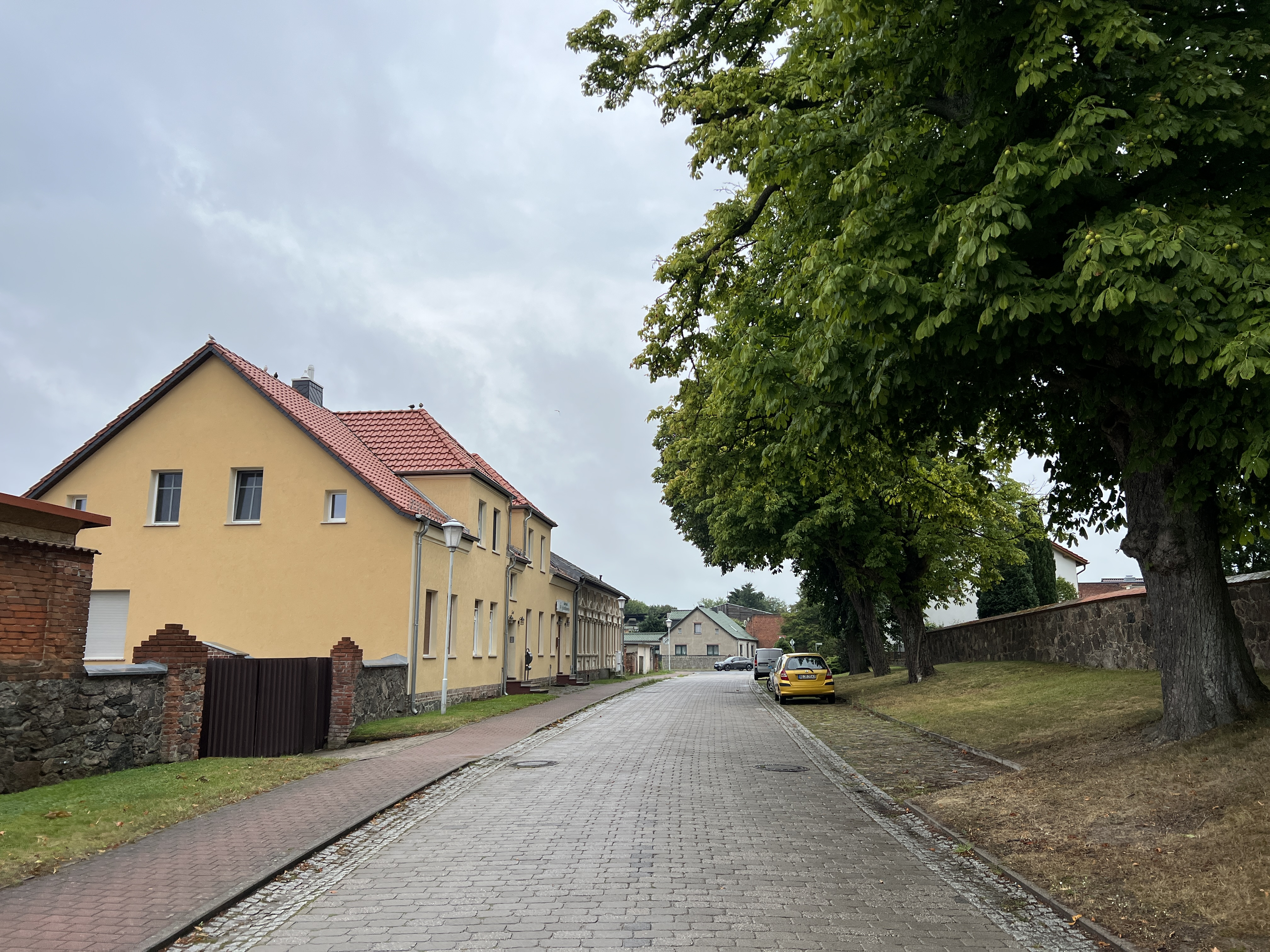

- Coat of arms

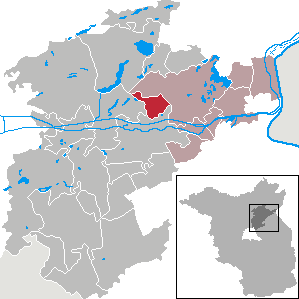
- Location of Britz within Barnim district
- Interactive map of Britz
- Location within Germany Location within Brandenburg
- Coordinates: 52°53′N 13°48′E
- Country: Germany
- State: Brandenburg
- District: Barnim
- Municipal assoc.: Britz-Chorin-Oderberg

Government
  - Mayor (2024–29): André Guse

Area
  - Total: 15.5 km^{2} (6.0 sq mi)
- Elevation: 55 m (180 ft)

Population (2025-12-31)
  - Total: 2,096
  - Density: 135/km^{2} (350/sq mi)
- Time zone: UTC+01:00 (CET)
  - Summer (DST): UTC+02:00 (CEST)
- Postal codes: 16230
- Dialling codes: 03334
- Vehicle registration: BAR
- Website: www.britz-chorin.de

Britz (German pronunciation: [bʁɪts]) is a municipality in the district of Barnim in Brandenburg in north-eastern Germany.

== History ==
From 1815 to 1947, Britz was part of the Prussian Province of Brandenburg, from 1947 to 1952 of the State of Brandenburg, from 1952 to 1990 of the Bezirk Frankfurt of East Germany and since 1990 again of Brandenburg.

During World War II, from March 1942 to August 1943, it was the location of a forced labour for Jewish men.

== Demography ==
Development of population since 1875 within the current boundaries (Blue line: Population; Dotted line: Comparison to population development of Brandenburg state; Grey background: Time of Nazi rule; Red background: Time of communist rule)

Britz: Population development
within the current boundaries (2020)

Year	Pop.	±% p.a.
1875	537	—
1890	668	+1.47%
1910	1,312	+3.43%
1925	1,644	+1.52%
1933	2,032	+2.68%
1939	2,290	+2.01%
1946	2,345	+0.34%
1950	2,321	−0.26%
1964	2,445	+0.37%
1971	2,552	+0.61%
1981	2,481	−0.28%
1985	2,379	−1.04%
1989	2,252	−1.36%
1990	2,212	−1.78%
1991	2,309	+4.39%

Year	Pop.	±% p.a.
1992	2,202	−4.63%
1993	2,164	−1.73%
1994	2,164	+0.00%
1995	2,151	−0.60%
1996	2,203	+2.42%
1997	2,256	+2.41%
1998	2,321	+2.88%
1999	2,378	+2.46%
2000	2,405	+1.14%
2001	2,385	−0.83%
2002	2,383	−0.08%
2003	2,355	−1.17%
2004	2,312	−1.83%
2005	2,307	−0.22%
2006	2,269	−1.65%

Year	Pop.	±% p.a.
2007	2,250	−0.84%
2008	2,226	−1.07%
2009	2,201	−1.12%
2010	2,156	−2.04%
2011	2,145	−0.51%
2012	2,134	−0.51%
2013	2,148	+0.66%
2014	2,132	−0.74%
2015	2,137	+0.23%
2016	2,130	−0.33%
2017	2,089	−1.92%
2018	2,084	−0.24%
2019	2,088	+0.19%
2020	2,137	+2.35%
