= Barnim =

Coordinates: 52°50′N 13°45′E

- District
- Flag Coat of arms
- Country: Germany
- State: Brandenburg
- Capital: Eberswalde

Government
  - District admin. (2026–34): Daniel Kurth (SPD)

Area
  - Total: 1,494 km^{2} (577 sq mi)

Population (31 December 2025)
  - Total: 194,885
  - Density: 130.4/km^{2} (337.9/sq mi)
- Time zone: UTC+01:00 (CET)
  - Summer (DST): UTC+02:00 (CEST)
- Vehicle registration: BAR, BER, EW
- Website: www.barnim.de

Barnim (German pronunciation: [ˈbaʁnɪm]) is a district in Brandenburg, Germany. It is bounded by (from the east and clockwise) Poland, the district of Märkisch-Oderland, the city state of Berlin and the districts of Oberhavel and Uckermark.

== History ==
The name "Barnim" emerged in the 13th century and was applied to a large forest region east of the Havel and north of the Spree on the homonymous plateau, where noblemen used to hunt. The present district is roughly identical with, but somewhat smaller than this historical region.

The district was established in 1993 by merging the former districts of Bernau and Eberswalde.

== Geography ==
Barnim extends from the Oder River to the outskirts of Berlin. The Oder River forms the eastern border. From here the Oder Havel Canal (connecting Oder and Havel) and the historical Finow Canal lead westwards to Eberswalde and beyond. The portions north of these artificial waterways are called Schorfheide. This is a forest region with several large lakes, e.g. Werbellinsee (8 km^{2}), Grimnitzsee (8 km^{2}) and Parsteiner See (10 km^{2}). The Schorfheide is a UNESCO Biosphere Reserve and houses several rare animals like the white-tailed eagle, greater spotted eagle, osprey, black stork, European beaver and Eurasian otter.

== Demography ==
Development of Population since 1875 within the Current Boundaries (Blue Line: Population; Dotted Line: Comparison to Population Development of Brandenburg state; Grey background: Time of Nazi rule; Red background: Time of communist rule)

Recent Population Development and Projections (Population Development before Census 2011 (blue line); Recent Population Development according to the Census in Germany in 2011 and 2022 (blue bordered line); Official projection for 2024-2040 in three variants (dotted lines 2025-2040)

Landkreis Barnim: Population development
within the current boundaries (2025)

| Year | Pop. | ±% p.a. |
|---|---|---|
| 1875 | 74,305 | — |
| 1890 | 85,169 | +0.91% |
| 1910 | 106,837 | +1.14% |
| 1925 | 115,955 | +0.55% |
| 1933 | 133,005 | +1.73% |
| 1939 | 154,918 | +2.57% |
| 1946 | 154,627 | −0.03% |
| 1950 | 159,481 | +0.78% |
| 1964 | 153,249 | −0.28% |
| 1971 | 155,650 | +0.22% |

| Year | Pop. | ±% p.a. |
|---|---|---|
| 1981 | 156,734 | +0.07% |
| 1985 | 156,658 | −0.01% |
| 1990 | 150,687 | −0.77% |
| 1995 | 151,783 | +0.15% |
| 2000 | 170,288 | +2.33% |
| 2005 | 176,693 | +0.74% |
| 2010 | 176,848 | +0.02% |
| 2015 | 177,411 | +0.06% |
| 2020 | 187,343 | +1.10% |
| 2025 | 194,885 | +0.79% |

== Coat of arms ==
District banner of Barnim

The coat of arms of the district resembles the coat of arms of the former district Oberbarnim. The only difference is that the old one had a silver top half and a red bottom half, while the current one is split into four parts and in the right half exchanged red and silver. The eagle in the top half is the eagle of Brandenburg.

== Towns and municipalities ==
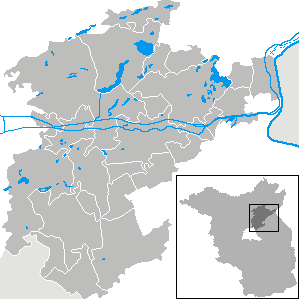
Clickable map of towns and municipalities in the district

| Amt-free towns | Ämter |
|---|---|---|
| 1. Bernau bei Berlin; 2. Eberswalde; 3. Werneuchen; Amt-free municipalities: 1. Ahrensfelde; 2. Panketal; 3. Schorfheide; 4. Wandlitz | 1. Biesenthal-Barnim; 1. Biesenthal^{1, 2}; 2. Breydin; 3. Marienwerder; 4. Melchow; 5. Rüdnitz; 6. Sydower Fließ; 2. Britz-Chorin-Oderberg; 1. Britz^{1}; 2. Chorin; 3. Hohenfinow; 4. Liepe; 5. Lunow-Stolzenhagen; 6. Niederfinow; 7. Oderberg^{2}; 8. Parsteinsee | 3. Joachimsthal (Schorfheide); 1. Althüttendorf; 2. Friedrichswalde; 3. Joachimsthal^{1, 2}; 4. Ziethen |
^{1}seat of the Amt; ^{2}town
