= Ragöse =

River in Brandenburg, Germany

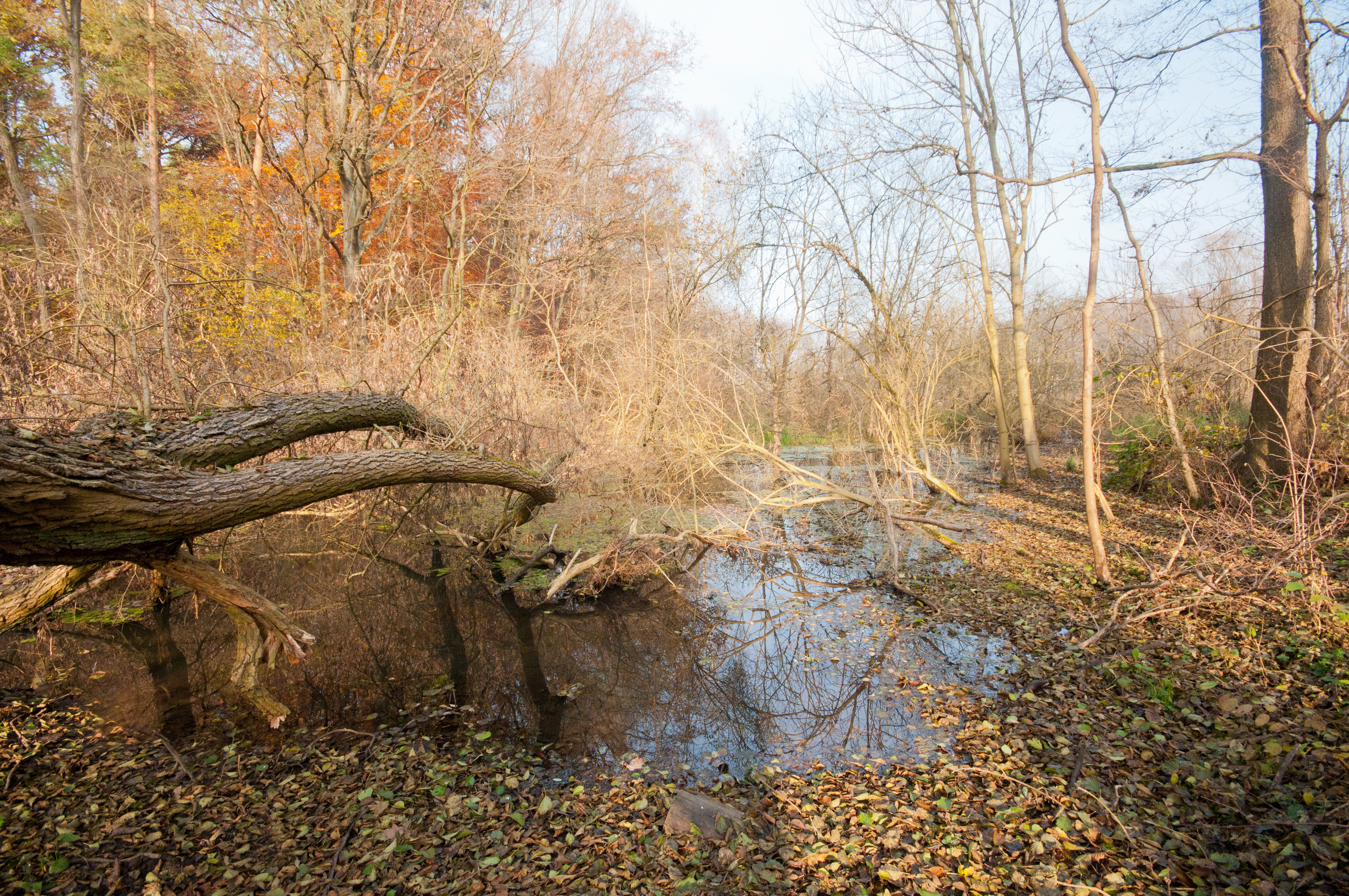

Location
- Country: Germany
- State: Brandenburg
- Location: Schorfheide-Chorin Biosphere Reserve

Physical characteristics
- Source
  - location: a) Nearby Golzow, part of Chorin b) outflow of the Amtssee at the Chorin Abbey
  - elevation: 45 m (148 ft)
- Mouth
  - location: near Eberswalde into the Finow Canal
  - coordinates: 52.8492°N 13.8606°E
  - elevation: 7 m (23 ft)
- Length: 10 km (6.2 mi)

Basin features
- Progression: Finow Canal→ Oder→ Baltic Sea

Ragöse is a river of Brandenburg, Germany. It has several sources near Chorin and flows for 10 kilometres (6 mi) through the Schorfheide-Chorin Biosphere Reserve to the Finow Canal, east of Eberswalde.

== See also ==
- List of rivers of Brandenburg
