= Amtssee =

Lake in Brandenburg, Germany

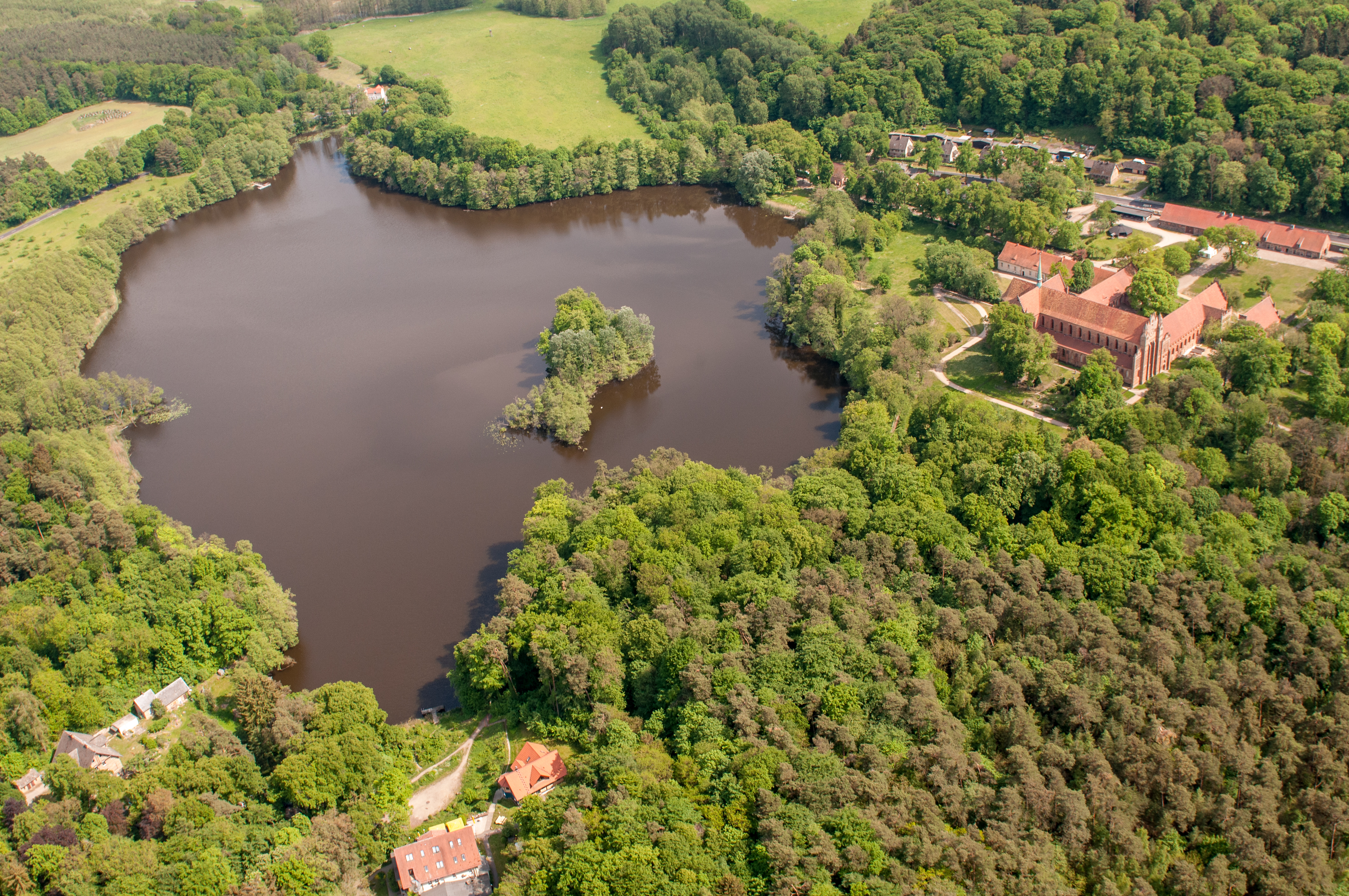

- Location within Brandenburg
- Location: Schorfheide-Chorin Biosphere Reserve, Brandenburg, Germany
- Coordinates: 52°53′34″N 13°53′1″E
- Primary inflows: Nettelgraben
- Primary outflows: Ragöse
- Basin countries: Germany
- Max. length: ca. 600 m (2,000 ft)
- Max. width: 400 m (1,300 ft)

Amtssee is a lake in the Schorfheide-Chorin Biosphere Reserve in Brandenburg, Germany. It is located in the municipality of Chorin, Barnim district.
