= Choriner Musiksommer =

German music festival

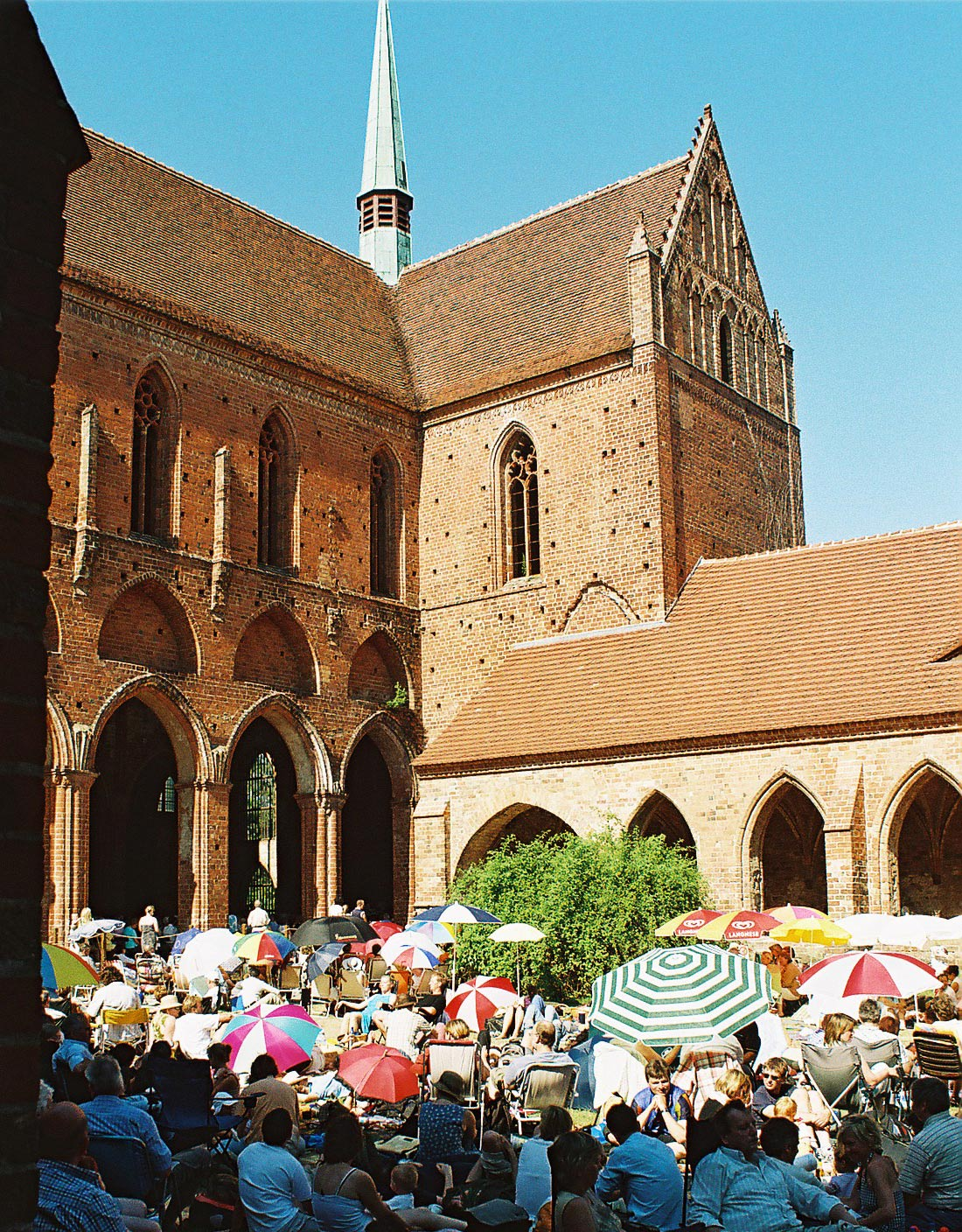
The Choriner Musiksommer in 2006.

The Choriner Musiksommer (literally, Chorin's Summer of Music) is an outdoor music festival held in the ruins of the convent of Chorin Abbey in Chorin, Brandenburg, Germany.

It originated as a single annual concert, established on 23 May 1964 by Albert Richter as an event for employees of the Hochschule für nachhaltige Entwicklung (Eberswalde University for Sustainable Development) in Eberswalde. The forest administration then managed the monastery ruins. So they became the venue for the concert. The number of concerts was raised to four in 1970 and from then until 1973 numbers rose from 600 to 1200 and finally 2,100 per concert. In 1974 the number of concerts was increased to thirteen.

After the fall of the Berlin Wall in 1989 the festival's organisation was transferred to an independent organisation (Choriner Musiksommer e.V.). It now consists of nineteen concerts per season (June - August) of 17th to 19th-century music, rarely-heard pieces and choral music. Choriner Musiksommer is a registered brand (certificate 304 50 535 / Deutsches Patent- und Markenamt).
