= Albert Richter (forester) =

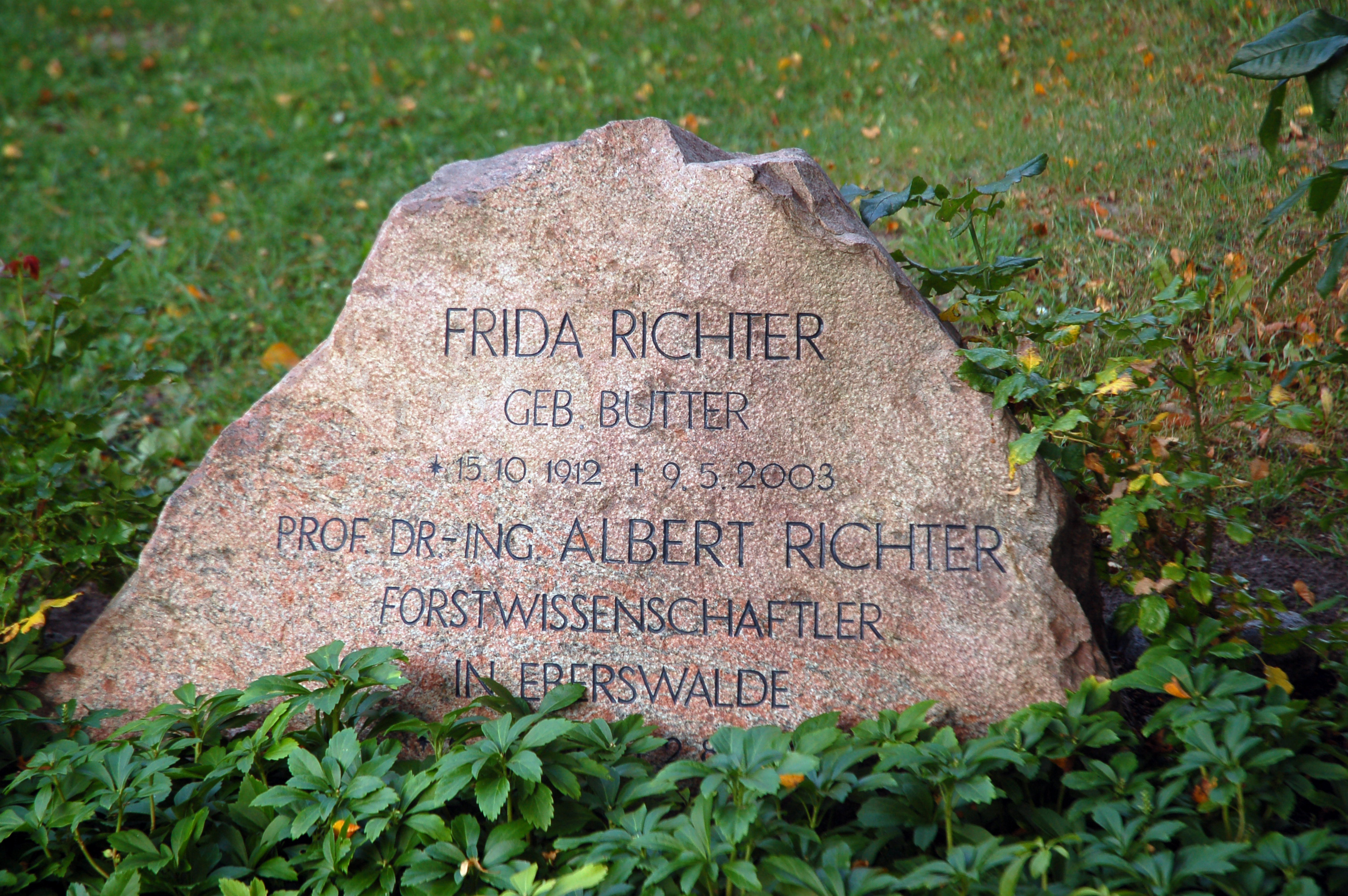
Richter's gravestone.

Albert Richter (6 May 1909 – 2 August 2007) was a German academic and expert in silviculture or forest management. He is notable for founding the Choriner Musiksommer music festival, developing a new planning-process for forest management for the German Democratic Republic in the 1950s, and writing several works on the history of forest management, including a biography of Heinrich Cotta. He also served as a professor and director of the Forestry College in Eberswalde. Richter was a member of the German Academy of Agricultural Sciences.

Richter was born in Lossnitz in Freiberg, Saxony in 1909 and died, aged 98, at Eberswalde in Brandenburg in 2007.
