= Finow =

River in Germany

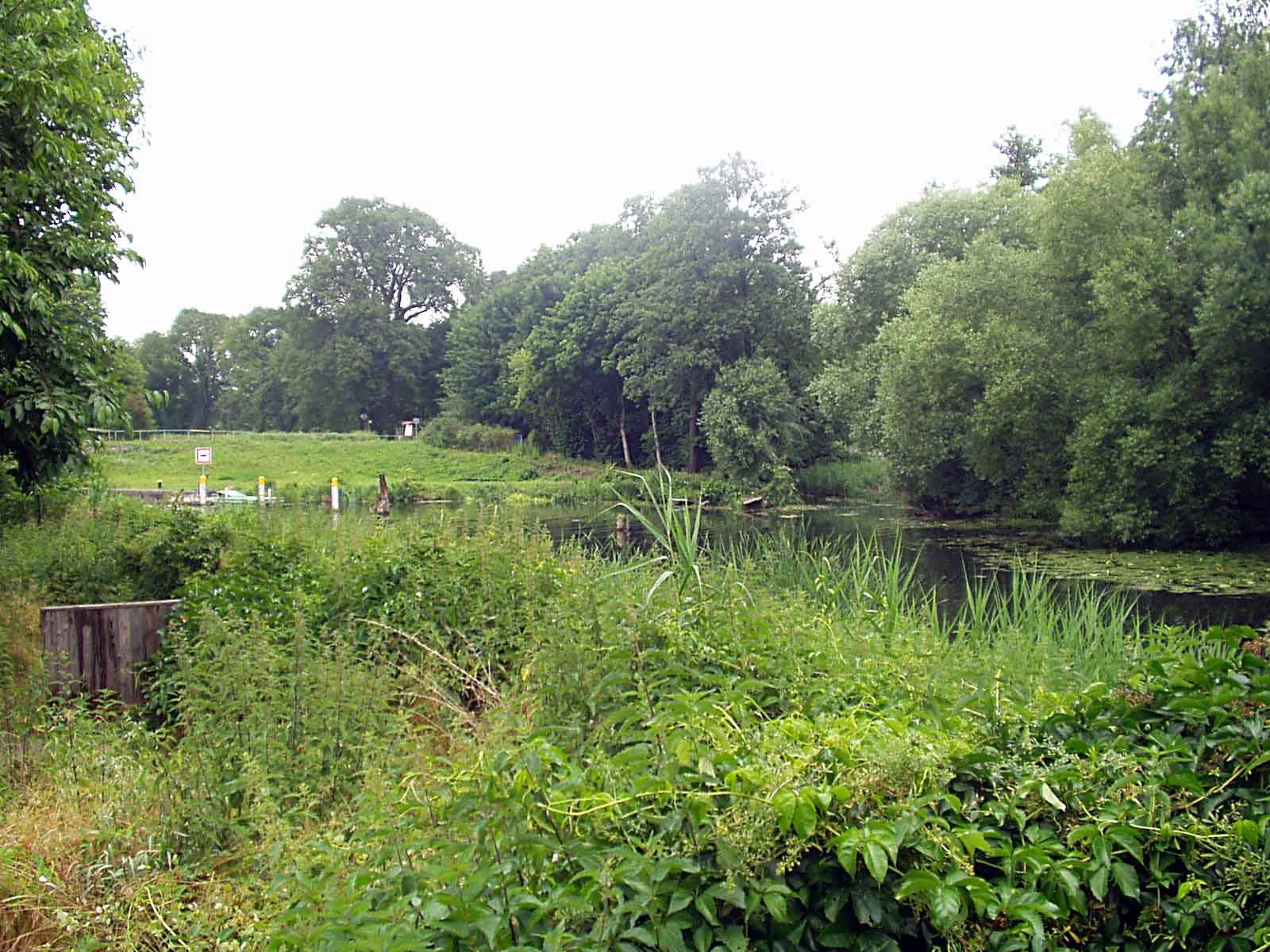

Location
- Country: Germany
- State: Brandenburg

Physical characteristics
- Mouth
  - location: Finow Canal
  - coordinates: 52°50′43″N 13°38′56″E

Basin features
- Progression: Finow Canal→ Oder→ Baltic Sea

Finow is a river of Brandenburg, Germany. Originally, it flowed into the Oder near Oderberg, but since the creation of the Finow Canal in the 17th century, it flows into this canal near Finowfurt.

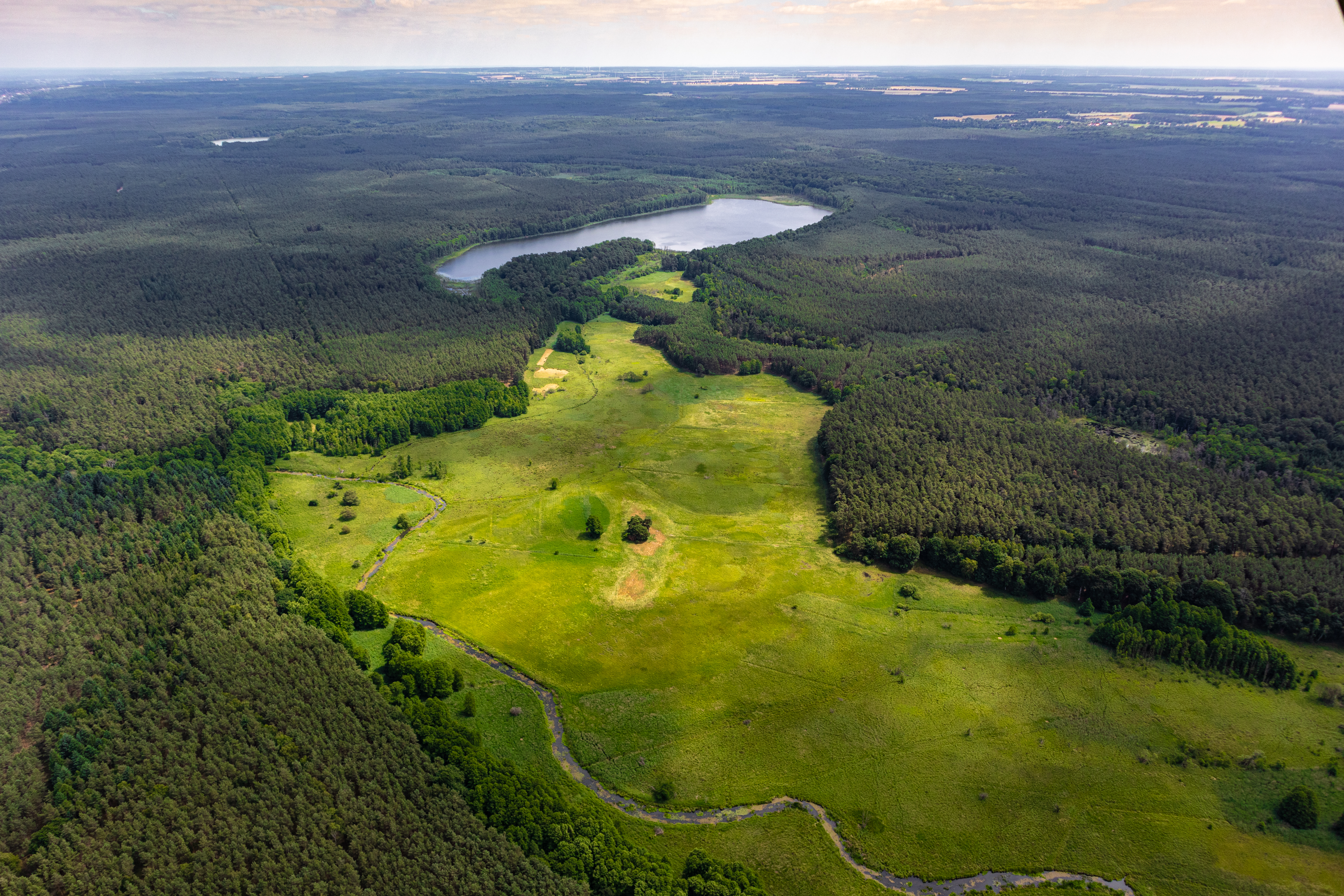
The stream Finow and the lake Großer Samithsee near Finowfurt

== See also ==
- List of rivers of Brandenburg
