= Hans Dresig =

German mechanical engineer (1937–2018)

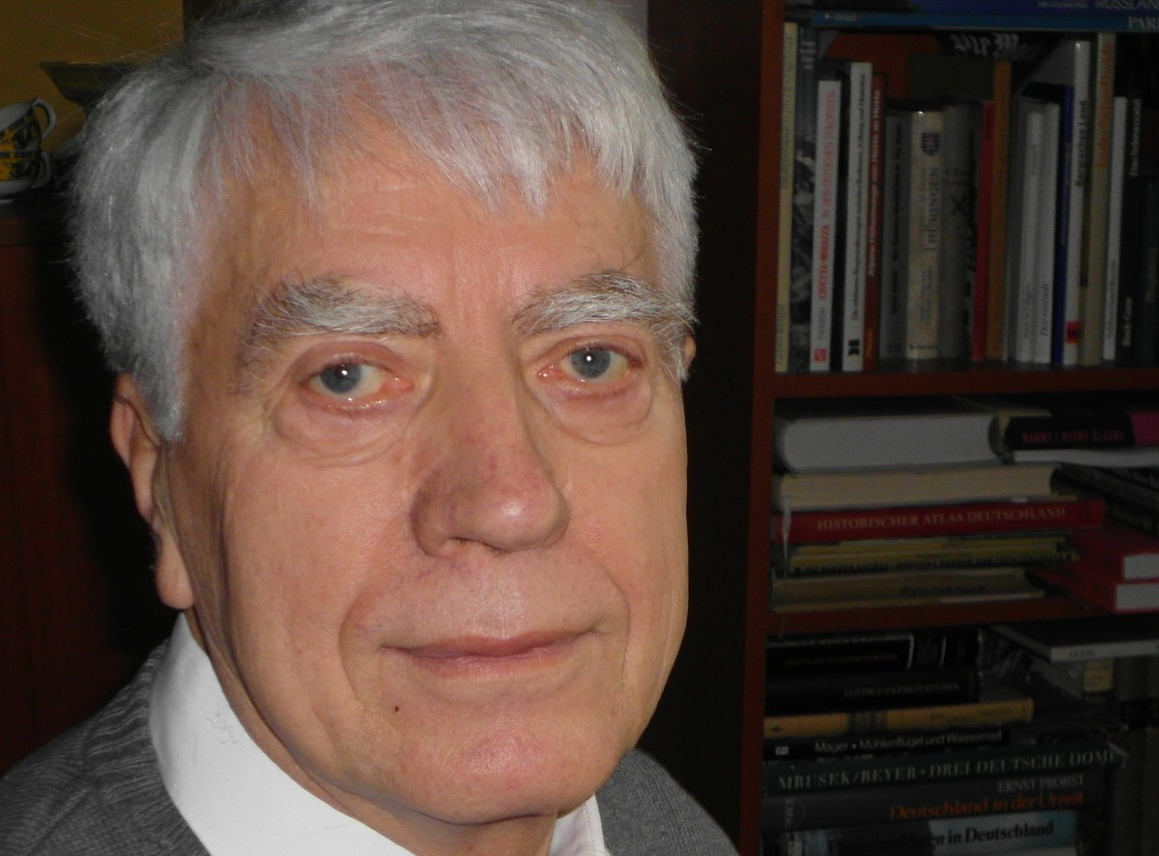
Hans Dresig.

Hans Dresig (31 January 1937 in Dölau near Halle (Saale), Germany – 25 April 2018 in Lichtenau, Saxony) was a German professor for applied mechanics and theory of mechanisms and machines.

== Career ==
Dresig started to study in 1954 at the Dresden University of Technology. As student he specialized in transportation machines and equipment. His special interests were theoretical subjects, like Applied Mathematics, Physics, Technical Mechanics and Theory of Mechanisms and Machines.

After graduating in 1960 he joined the chair of Technical Mechanics. Since then he had been working on dynamics of machines, for instance with mechanisms, oscillating conveyors and cranes. He received his master's degree and Doctor Degree from Dresden University of Technology in 1965. After defending his doctoral thesis he started working for a design office in the crane construction company “Kranbau Eberswalde” in Eberswalde.

After 4 years he was appointed to a lecturer at the Chemnitz University of Technology. He also completed his postdoctoral work there in 1970. After having worked as a lecturer for eight years, he was offered a professorship in 1978.

Dresig was a professor and Ph.D. supervisor in Chemnitz University of Technology. During that time he had been giving lectures on a variety of subjects, such as Statics, Strength of materials, Dynamics, Theory of Vibrations, Balancing of rotating masses and Optimization of Machines.

In addition to these lectures he worked on many projects with industrial partners in mechanical engineering. He wrote, together with Franz Holzweißig, the textbook “Dynamics of Machinery”. In 1979 was published the first edition. In 2010 the 10th edition came out in Germany and today it is available in Vietnamese, English and Chinese translation. His researches have been published in more than 220 papers. In addition, he is author and co-author of about 10 books and also the inventor of about 20 patents. He was a member in Committee of Drive Technology in the Association of German Engineers (VDI), an advisor of “Alexander von Humboldt Foundation” and German Research Foundation (DFG). He held lectures in the US, Switzerland, Austria, France, Italy, Poland, Czechoslovakia, Bulgaria, Russia, Ukraine, Vietnam and China.

Since 2009 he had been a visiting professor at Nanjing Agricultural University, China.

== Bibliography (selected) ==
- Dresig, H.; Holzweißig, F. (2011). Maschinendynamik. Springer Science+Business Media, Berlin, Heidelberg. ISBN 978-3-642-16009-7.
- Dresig, H.; Holzweißig, F. (2011). Dynamics of Machinery. Theory and Applications. Springer Science+Business Media, Dordrecht, London, New York. ISBN 978-3-540-89939-6.
- Dresig, H.; Holzweißig, F. (2012). 机器动力学(附光盘)(光盘1张) (Dynamics of Machinery). Science Press, Beijing. ISBN 978-7-03-032743-7.
