= Albrecht Milnik =

German forest scientist (1931–2021)

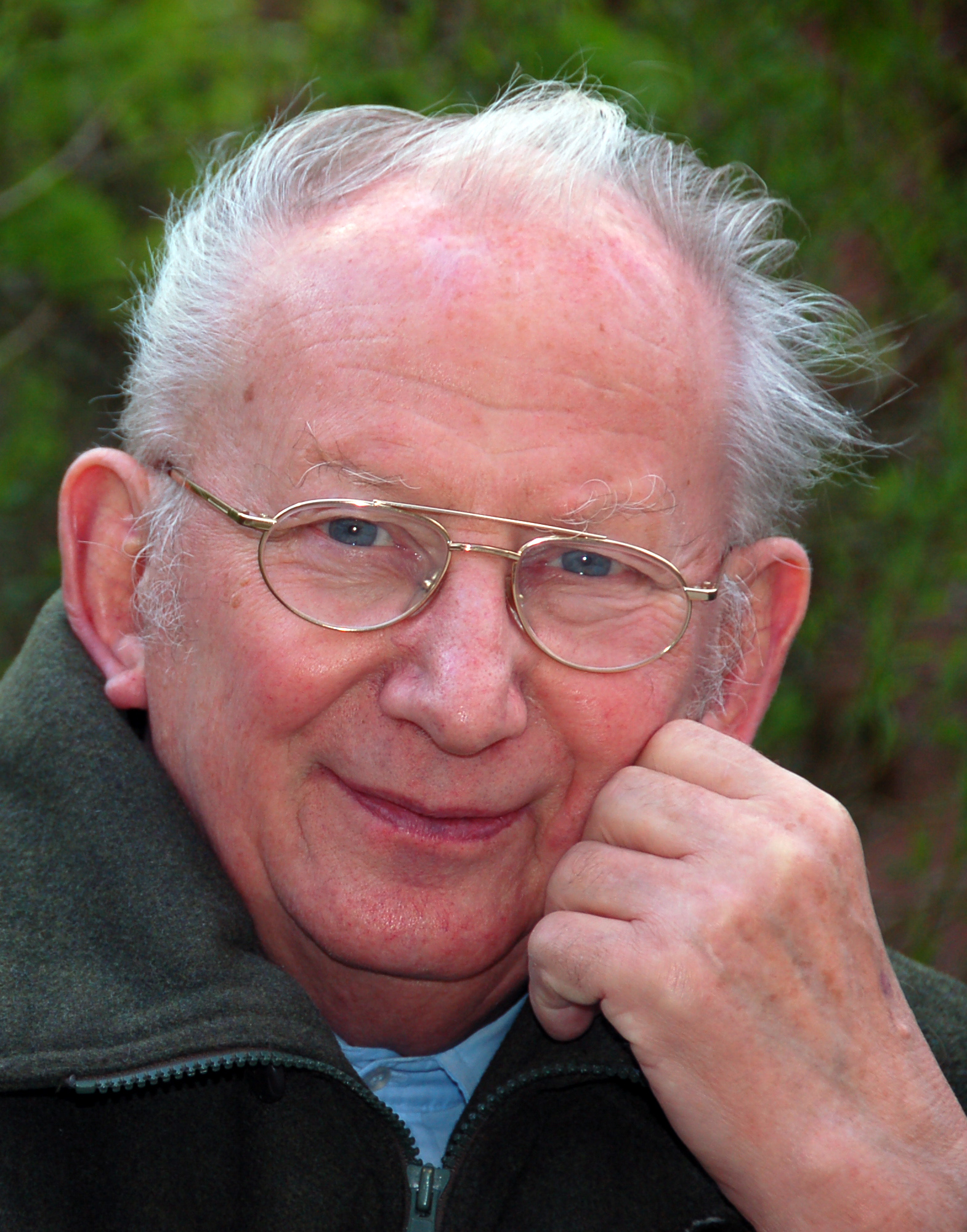
Milnik in 2010

Albrecht Milnik (10 November 1931 in Hermsdorf, today Görlitz, as part of Gmina Zgorzelec – 22 December 2021 in Eberswalde) was a German forest scientist.

During his lifetime, he was considered a leading expert on forestry science in Germany.

== Bibliography ==
- Ekkehard Schwartz: "Albrecht Milnik 70 Jahre". In: AFZ/DerWald. Allgemeine Forst-Zeitschrift für Waldwirtschaft und Umweltvorsorge. 56. Jahrgang, Heft 22/2001, ISSN 1430-2713, S. 1199
- Agnes Steinbauer: Die Theorie ist grau, der Wald ist grün. 1783 wurde der Forstwissenschaftler und erste Ökologe Wilhelm Leopold Pfeil geboren. Sendung des Deutschlandfunks vom 28 March 2008 aus Anlass des 125. Geburtstags Pfeils mit Fachkommentaren Milniks (Text und Podcast); retrieved 12 August 2009
