= Forstbotanischer Garten Eberswalde =

Botanical garden and arboretum in Brandenburg, Germany

Coordinates: 52°49′30.53″N 13°47′45.89″E

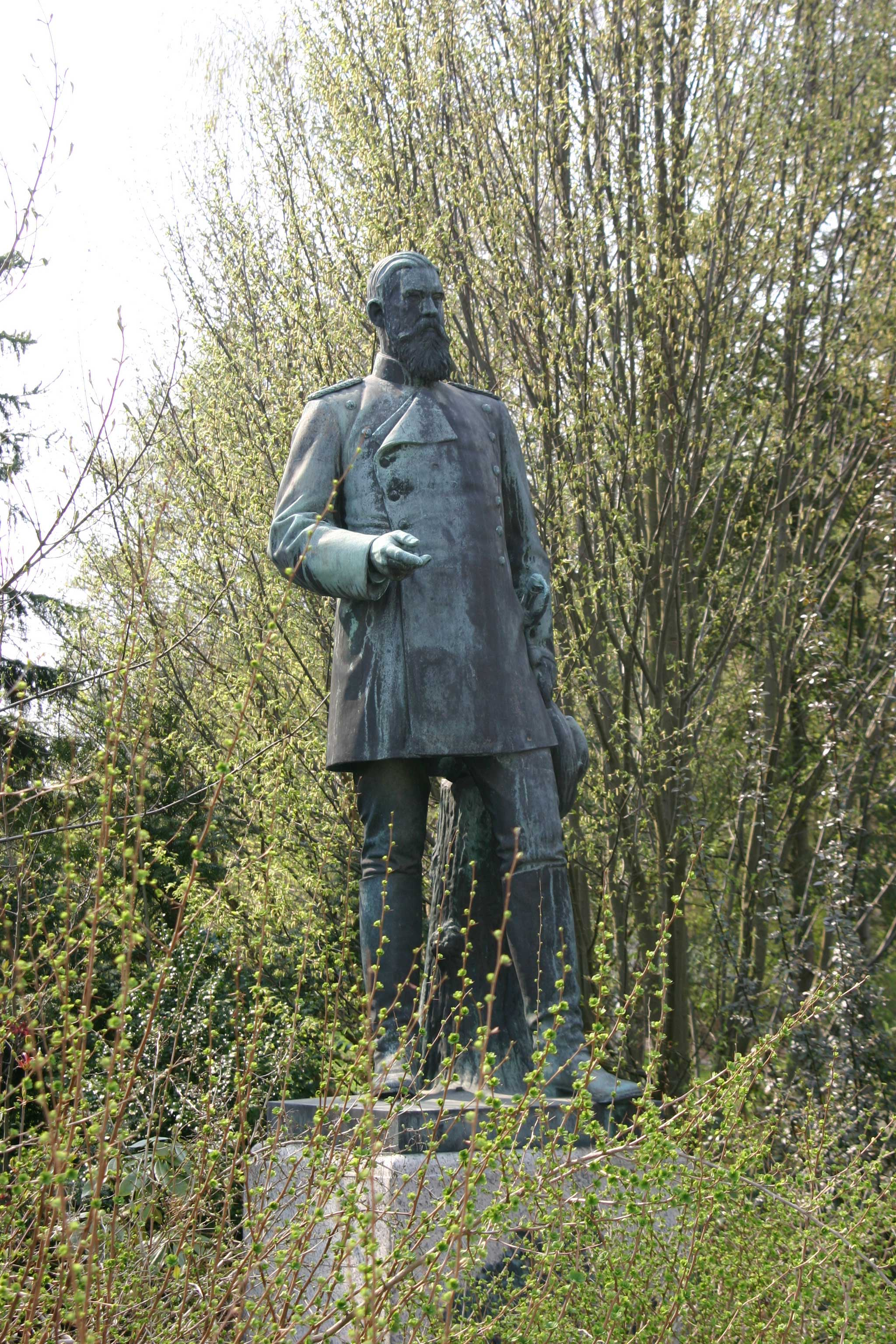
Forstbotanischer Garten Eberswalde – statue of Bernhard Danckelmann

The Forstbotanischer Garten Eberswalde (8 hectares) is a botanical garden and arboretum located at Am Zainhammer 5, Eberswalde, Brandenburg, Germany. It is open daily without charge.

The garden was established in 1830 as part of the Royal Prussian Higher Forestry College by Friedrich Wilhelm Leopold Pfeil (1783-1859) with Wilhelm von Humboldt (1767-1835). By 1835 its plant list included more than 600 types of trees. Between 1868 and 1874, under the direction of Bernhard Danckelmann (1831-1901), the garden moved to its current location. It was severely damaged during World War II but restored in subsequent years.

Today the garden contains over 1200 native and exotic trees and shrubs, with major sections including perennial flower beds; a root laboratory; alpine garden; African and East Asian gardens; trial garden; systematic garden; herb garden; and a Salicetum containing 230 types of willow trees. A special feature is the garden's geological trail highlighting representative crystalline sedimentary rocks deposited in this location by ice age glaciers.

== See also ==
- List of botanical gardens in Germany
