= Eberswalde Synagogue =

Former synagogue in Eberswalde, Germany

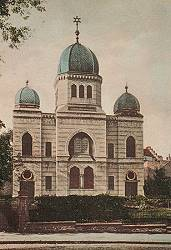
- Postcard depicting the synagogue, c. 1910

Religion
- Affiliation: Judaism
- Ecclesiastical or organisational status: Destroyed

Location
- Location: Goethestraße, Eberswalde, Brandenburg
- Country: Germany
- Interactive map of Eberswalde Synagogue
- Coordinates: 52.831455°N 13.818813°E

Architecture
- Architect: Ferdinand Münzenberger
- Type: Synagogue
- Style: Moorish Revival
- Groundbreaking: 1890
- Completed: 1891
- Destroyed: 1938
- Dome: 3

The Eberswalde Synagogue was a synagogue in Eberswalde, the administrative seat of the Barnim district in northeastern Brandenburg, Germany. Built in 1890–1891, it stood on Bismarckstraße, now Goethestraße. It was destroyed by arson during Kristallnacht in November 1938.

== History ==
After the Jewish community acquired a plot at Schleifmühlenberg on Bismarckstraße, construction began in 1890 to a design by the Berlin architect Ferdinand Münzenberger. The building had three domes and a blue-and-white tiled façade in the Moorish Revival style. It was inaugurated on 1 September 1891. Construction was funded entirely through donations from members of the congregation.

In 1931, a lightning strike caused a fire that severely damaged the synagogue. Reconstruction began immediately, and the building was rededicated in the spring of 1932.

The synagogue was destroyed by arson during the November 1938 pogroms known as Kristallnacht.

== Memorial ==
On 9 November 2013, a memorial named Wachsen mit Erinnerung (Growing Memory) was inaugurated at the site of the former synagogue. Those attending included German president Joachim Gauck, Stephan Kramer, secretary-general of the Central Council of Jews in Germany, and Gunter Fritsch, president of the Landtag of Brandenburg.

== Gallery ==
Eberswalde in the 1920s, with the synagogue visible on the right

Eberswalde in the 1920s

Eberswalde in the 1920s

The synagogue in the 1920s
