= Bernhard Danckelmann =

German forester and forestry scientist

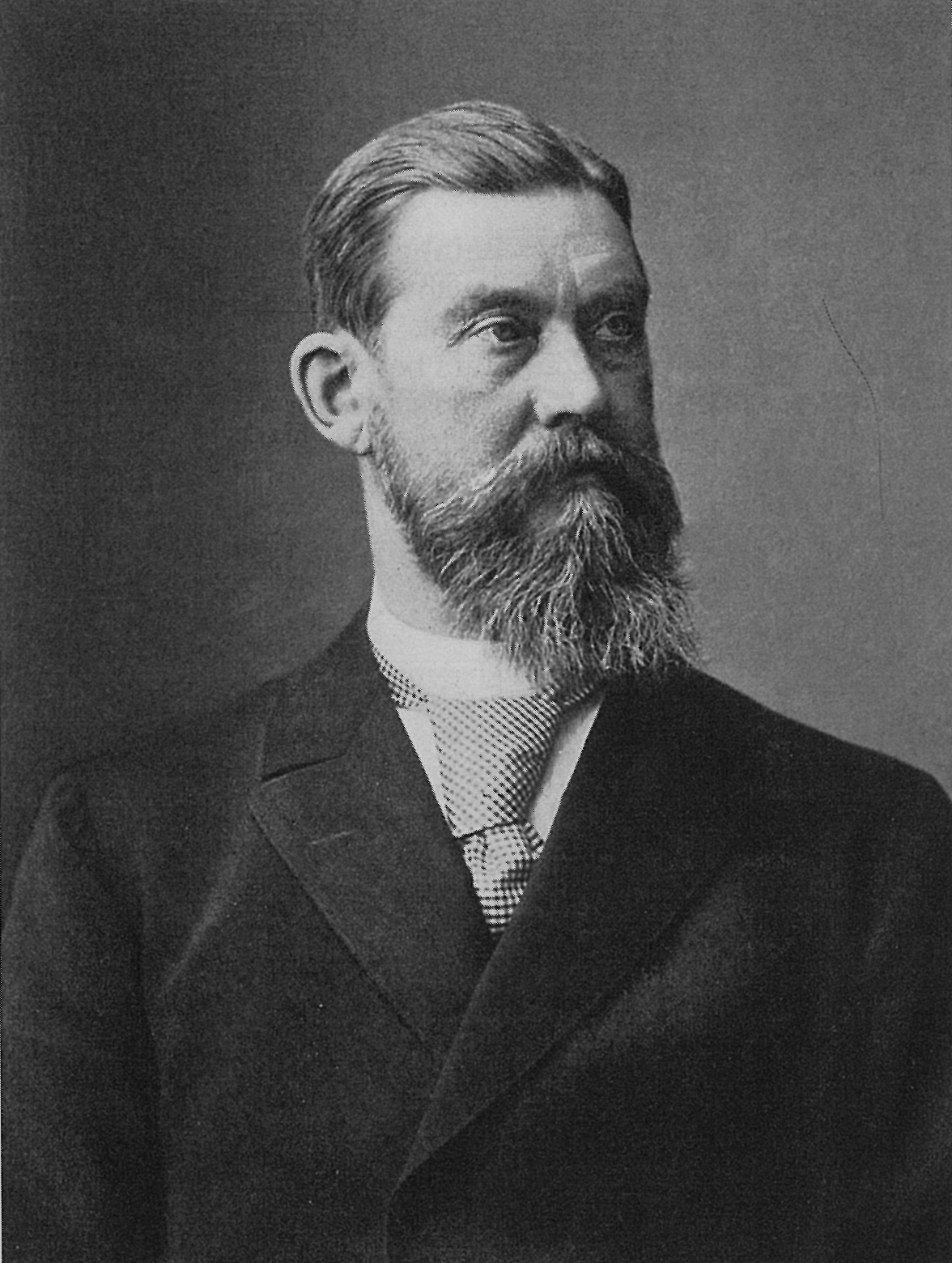
Bernhard Danckelmann

Bernhard Engelbert Joseph Danckelmann (5 April 1831, at the Forsthaus Obereimer near Arnsberg – 19 January 1901, in Eberswalde) was a German forester and forest scientist.

== Life ==
He studied forestry at the Eberswalde Forest Academy (Forstakademie) in 1850–52, and later studied law at the University of Berlin (1855–56). From 1862 he worked as an Oberförster in Hambach, and two years later became a forest inspector in Potsdam. In 1866 he was appointed director of the Forest Academy in Eberswalde.

From 1869 he was editor of the Zeitschrift für Forst und Jagdwesen ("Journal of Forestry and Gamekeeping").

== Selected writings ==
- "Die Forstakademie Eberwalde von 1830 bis 1880", in: Festschrift für die Fünfzigjährige Jubelfeier der Forstakademie Eberswalde, 1880, pp. [1]-62 – The forest academy in Eberswalde from 1830 to 1880, in: Festschrift for fifty years of jubilant celebration of the forestry academy in Eberswalde.
- Die Ablösung und Regelung der Waldgrundgerechtigkeiten, 1880.
- Die deutschen Nutzholzzölle; eine Waldschutzschrift, 1883 – German timber tariffs, a paper on forest protection.

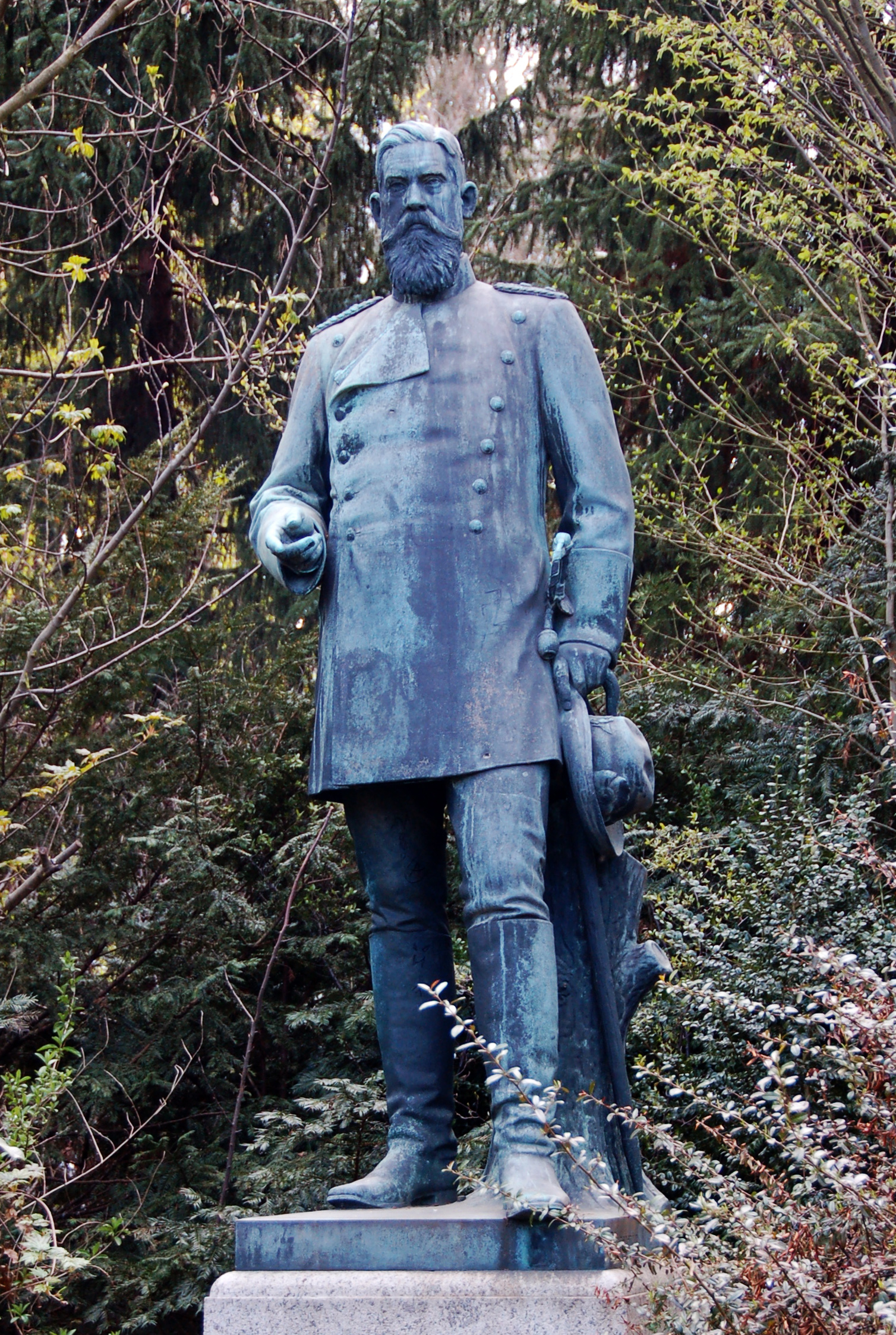
Monument of Bernhard Danckelmann in Weidendamm Park, Eberswalde (sculpture by Fritz Heinemann).

== See also ==
- Forstbotanischer Garten Eberswalde
