= Chorin =

- Municipality
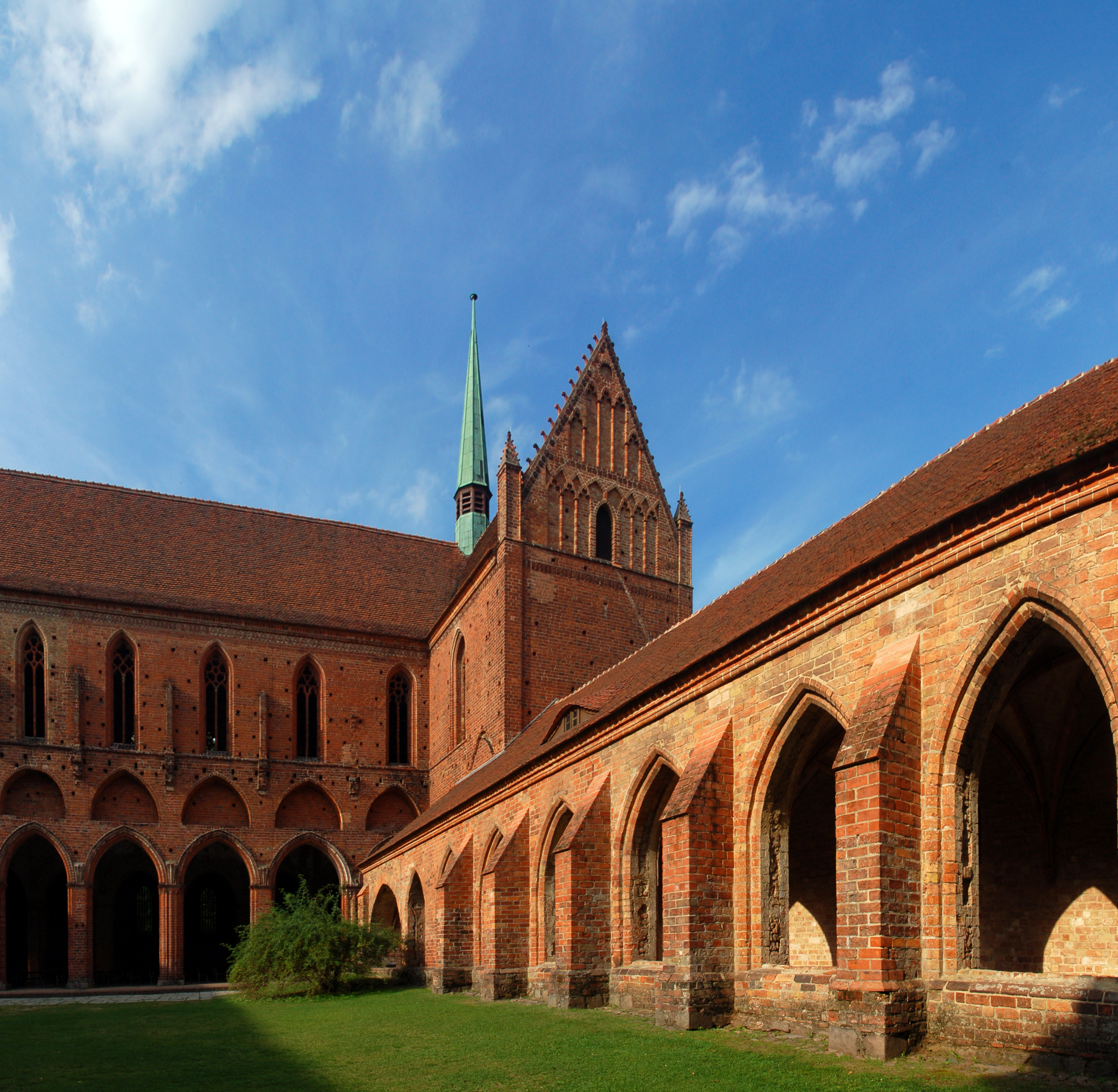
- Brick Gothic Chorin Abbey

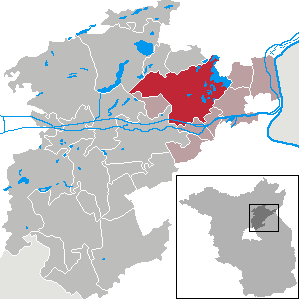
- Location of Chorin within Barnim district
- Interactive map of Chorin
- Location within Germany Location within Brandenburg
- Coordinates: 52°54′N 13°52′E
- Country: Germany
- State: Brandenburg
- District: Barnim
- Municipal assoc.: Britz-Chorin-Oderberg
- Subdivisions: 7 Ortsteile

Government
  - Mayor (2019–24): Martin Horst (CDU)

Area
  - Total: 122.06 km^{2} (47.13 sq mi)
- Elevation: 55 m (180 ft)

Population (2025-12-31)
  - Total: 2,218
  - Density: 18.17/km^{2} (47.06/sq mi)
- Time zone: UTC+01:00 (CET)
  - Summer (DST): UTC+02:00 (CEST)
- Postal codes: 16230
- Dialling codes: 033366
- Vehicle registration: BAR
- Website: www.britz-chorin.de

Chorin (German pronunciation: [koˈʁiːn]) is a municipality in the district of Barnim in Brandenburg, Germany. It is most famous for its cloister and for being situated within the Schorfheide-Chorin Biosphere Reserve. It is famous for its medieval Brick Gothic Chorin Abbey and the Choriner Musiksommer music festival held there.

== History ==
From 1815 to 1947, Chorin was part of the Prussian Province of Brandenburg, from 1947 to 1952 of the State of Brandenburg, from 1952 to 1990 of the Bezirk Frankfurt of East Germany and since 1990 again of Brandenburg.

== Demography ==
Development of population since 1875 within the current boundaries (Blue line: Population; Dotted line: Comparison to population development of Brandenburg state; Grey background: Time of Nazi rule; Red background: Time of communist rule)

Chorin: Population development
within the current boundaries (2020)

Year	Pop.	±% p.a.
1875	3,743	—
1890	3,757	+0.02%
1910	3,493	−0.36%
1925	3,532	+0.07%
1933	3,466	−0.24%
1939	3,559	+0.44%
1946	4,324	+2.82%
1950	4,245	−0.46%
1964	3,372	−1.63%
1971	3,186	−0.81%
1981	2,633	−1.89%
1985	2,497	−1.32%
1989	2,457	−0.40%
1990	2,415	−1.71%
1991	2,407	−0.33%

Year	Pop.	±% p.a.
1992	2,456	+2.04%
1993	2,478	+0.90%
1994	2,532	+2.18%
1995	2,568	+1.42%
1996	2,615	+1.83%
1997	2,632	+0.65%
1998	2,617	−0.57%
1999	2,629	+0.46%
2000	2,615	−0.53%
2001	2,598	−0.65%
2002	2,582	−0.62%
2003	2,596	+0.54%
2004	2,605	+0.35%
2005	2,569	−1.38%
2006	2,530	−1.52%

Year	Pop.	±% p.a.
2007	2,510	−0.79%
2008	2,508	−0.08%
2009	2,430	−3.11%
2010	2,381	−2.02%
2011	2,326	−2.31%
2012	2,290	−1.55%
2013	2,275	−0.66%
2014	2,281	+0.26%
2015	2,265	−0.70%
2016	2,290	+1.10%
2017	2,318	+1.22%
2018	2,339	+0.91%
2019	2,332	−0.30%
2020	2,359	+1.16%

== See also ==
- Amtssee
