= Schorfheide-Chorin Biosphere Reserve =

Biosphere reserve in Brandenberg, Germany

Coordinates: 52.97°N 13.82°E

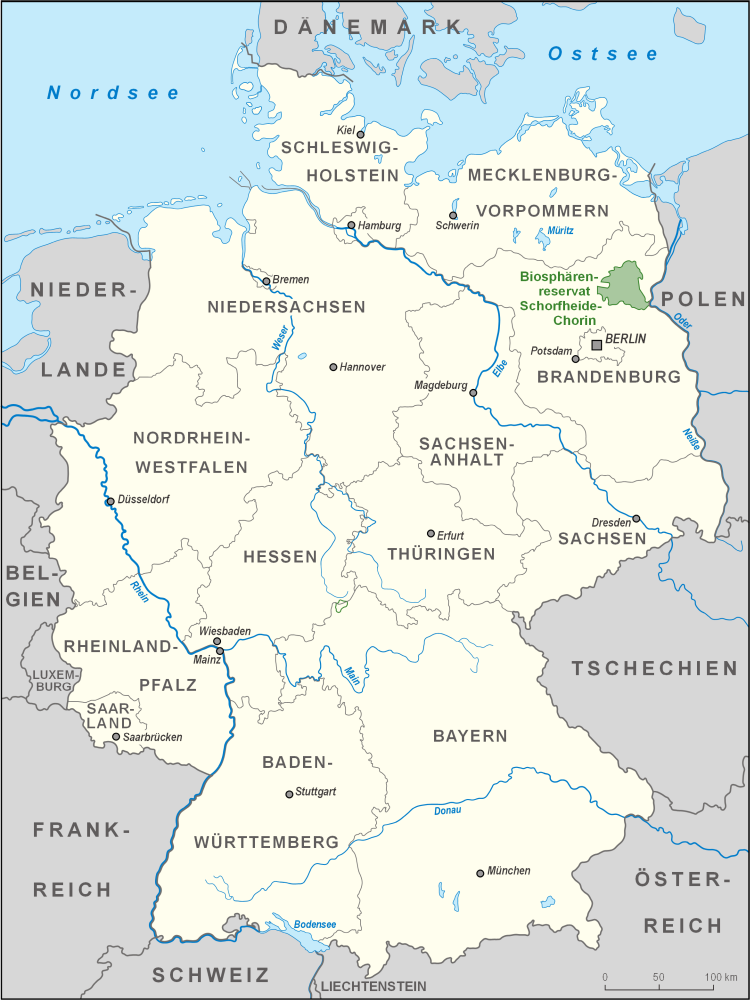
Location of the Schorfheide-Chorin Biosphere Reserve (green) in Germany

The Schorfheide-Chorin Biosphere Reserve, often shortened to Schorfheide (German pronunciation: [ˈʃɔʁfhaɪdə]), is a biosphere reserve in the German State of Brandenburg near the Polish border. The reserve was established on 1 October 1990 following the German Reunification and is under the protection of the UNESCO Man and Biosphere Reserve Programme. It stretches over the German districts of Barnim, Uckermark, Märkisch-Oderland and Oberhavel and incorporates an area of 1,291 square kilometres (498 sq mi). Notable towns are Eberswalde, Joachimsthal and Friedrichswalde. The core area of the reserve is formed by the Schorfheide forest, one of the largest cohesive woodlands in Germany.

== History ==
From the Early Middle Ages until the period of the Thirty Years' War, the area fell under the responsibility of the cloister of Chorin which led to a cultivation of suitable spaces. Forest clearances took place for the sake of producing weapons for the Prussian army, but the woods were usually afforested. Large parts of the woodland were left untouched as hunting areas for the nobility, which marked the creation of today's wilderness. During the Third Reich, Hermann Göring chose the spot for his country residence Carinhall. After World War II, the forests were again used as an exclusive hunting and leisure area for the East German leaders. The title of a Biosphere Reserve was awarded in 1990 following an initiative of then East German head of state Lothar de Maizière.

== Nature and biology ==
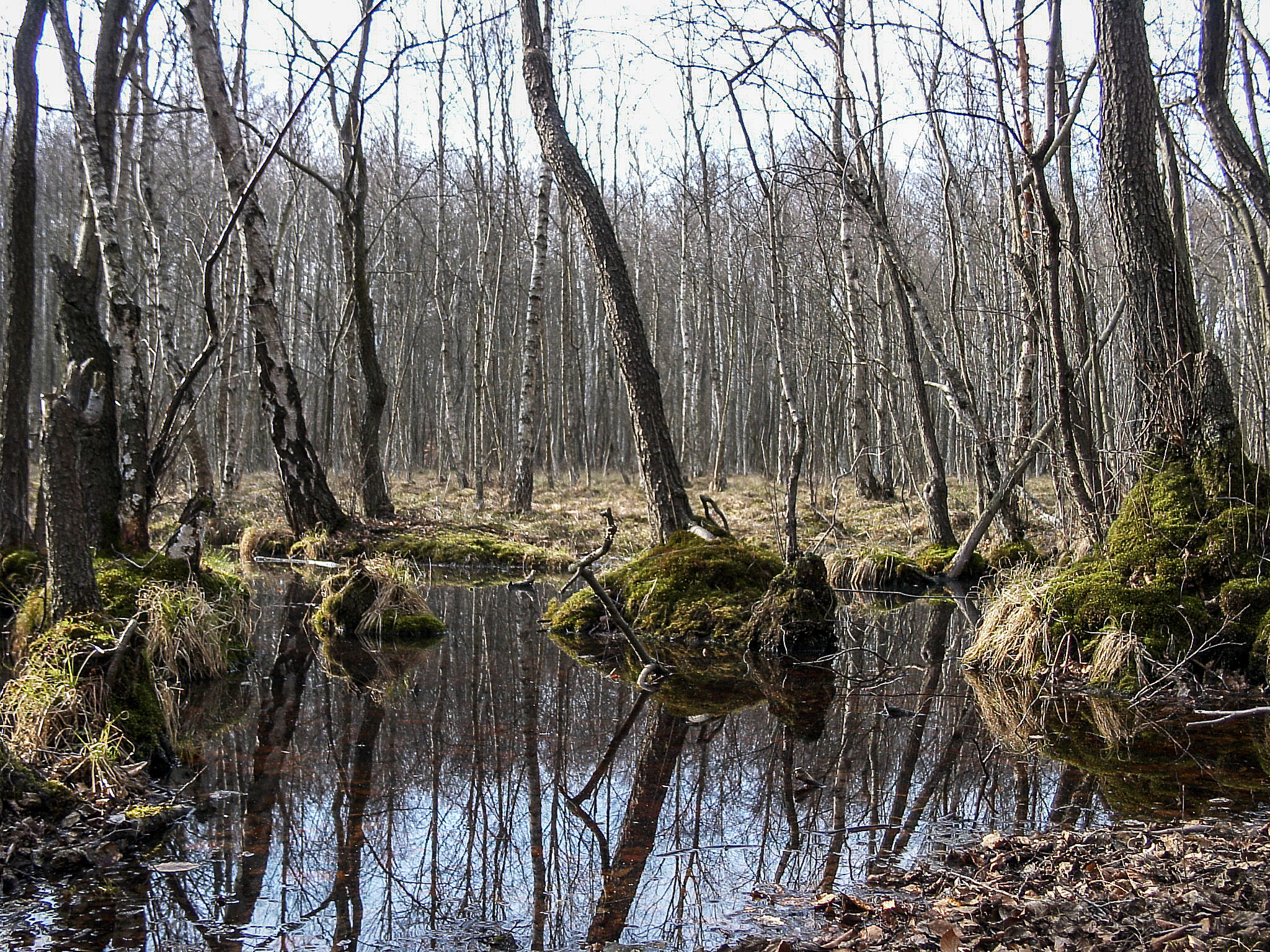
Carr landscape in the Schorfheide reserve.

The Schorfheide was formed during the last ice age. Today it is a cultural landscape composed of extensive woodlands (most of which are dominated by either oaks or pines), a wide range of bodies of standing water like lakes (most notably Werbellinsee, Grimnitzsee and Parsteiner See), ponds and renaturated bogs, as well as heathlands. Some parts of the Schorfheide are left as a wilderness. The reserve is crossed by the river Ragöse.

The Schorfheide-Chorin Biosphere Reserve is home of many forest-living animals like red deer and wild boars. Of special interest and goal of protection are those animals whose habitats are endangered elsewhere in Germany like beavers, otters, pond tortoises and fire-bellied toads. Due to its water bodies, the area serves as an important breeding and resting ground for birds like white-tailed eagles and cranes.
