= Eberswalde =

- Town
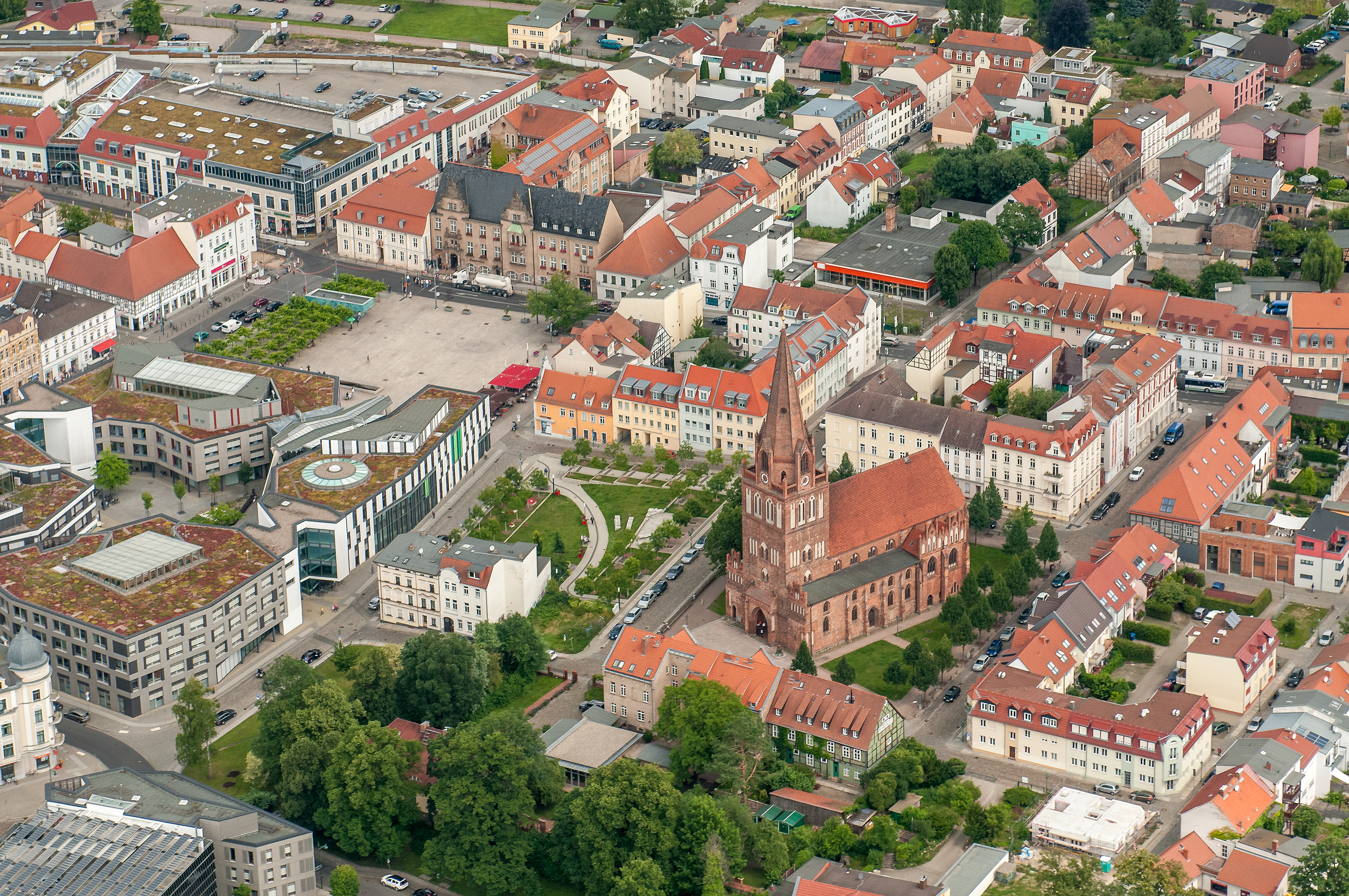
- Aerial view of the town center

- Coat of arms

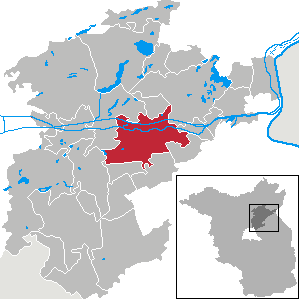
- Location of Eberswalde within Barnim district
- Interactive map of Eberswalde
- Location within Germany Location within Brandenburg
- Coordinates: 52°50′N 13°50′E
- Country: Germany
- State: Brandenburg
- District: Barnim
- Subdivisions: 7 Ortsteile

Government
  - Mayor (2022–30): Götz Herrmann SPD / Bfe

Area
  - Total: 93.64 km^{2} (36.15 sq mi)
- Elevation: 25 m (82 ft)

Population (2025-12-31)
  - Total: 41,867
  - Density: 447.1/km^{2} (1,158/sq mi)
- Time zone: UTC+01:00 (CET)
  - Summer (DST): UTC+02:00 (CEST)
- Postal codes: 16225/16227
- Dialling codes: 03334
- Vehicle registration: BAR, BER, EW
- Website: www.eberswalde.de

Eberswalde (German pronunciation: [ˌeːbɐsˈvaldə]) is a major town and the administrative seat of the district Barnim in Brandenburg in north-eastern Germany, about 50 km (31 mi) northeast of Berlin.

The town is often called Waldstadt (forest town), because of the large forests around it, including the Schorfheide-Chorin Biosphere Reserve. Despite this fact, Eberswalde was an important industrial center until the German Reunification.

== History ==
=== Prehistory ===
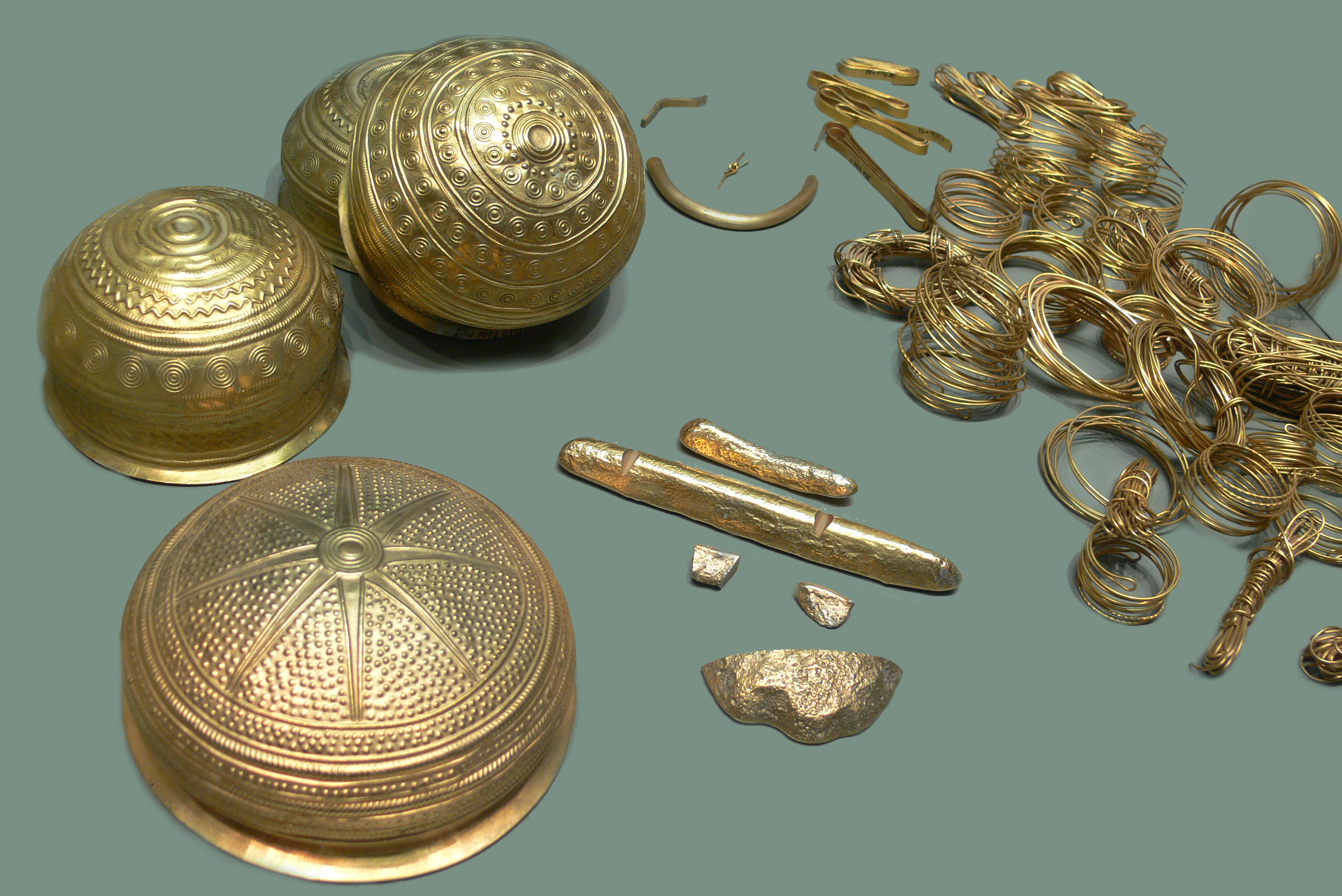
Treasure of Eberswalde

The area around Eberswalde was already populated in Paleolithic. Before the establishment of the Margraviate of Brandenburg it was the place of a Slavic stockade. The Treasure of Eberswalde, the largest pre-Christian gold treasure from the area of today's Germany was found here. Today the treasure is located in the Pushkin Museum in Moscow.

=== Founding and development ===
The town of Everswolde ("forest of the boars") was established in 1254 by the Ascanian margrave Johann I. It was first mentioned in a document dated 23 April 1276, when margrave Albrecht III. resided there. In 1300 it received market rights. From the year 1317 the main trade route between Szczecin and Frankfurt (Oder) went through the town. In 1319, it was captured by Henry II, Lord of Mecklenburg. From 1373 to 1415, it was part of the Lands of the Bohemian (Czech) Crown. A major fire struck the town in 1499.

After rebuilding the town, Eberswalde became the first industrial town of the Margraviate of Brandenburg, with huge metallurgy capacities. Some parts of the town are still named from their past function, like Kupferhammer ("copper hammer"). 1605 till 1620 the important waterway Finow Canal was built.

=== Thirty Years' War ===
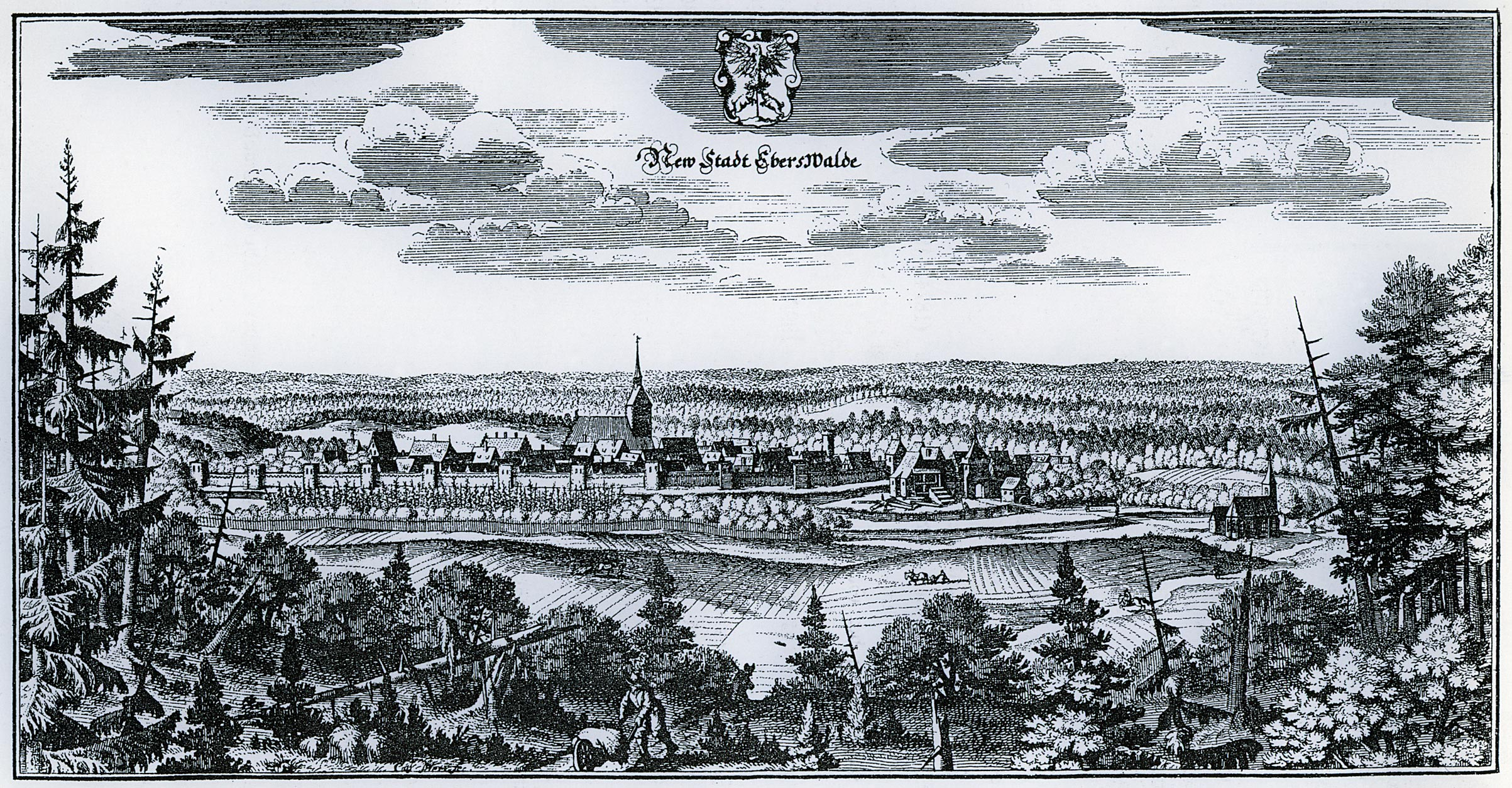
17th-century view

During the Thirty Years' War Eberswalde was besieged and conquered several times by nearly every important faction of the war. The general of the Catholic League, Albrecht von Wallenstein, resided in the town, later Gustavus Adolphus of Sweden, who did not survive the battle of Lützen, was embalmed in the town's Maria Magdalena church. Both parties forced the town population to support their troops. After the end of the war only 33 of formerly 216 houses still stood and of an original population of 1200 only 168 survived, 28 of which had full citizen status. It took Eberswalde more than a century to recover from its losses.

=== Rebirth and growth ===
Between 1743 and 1755 120 families of metalworkers moved from Thuringia and the Rhineland to Eberswalde. The boilers of the first German steam engines were made here. From 1815 to 1947, Eberswalde was part of the Prussian Province of Brandenburg. During the 19th century large factories were built in the area of Eberswalde, especially along the Finow Canal. In 1830 it became the site of what is now the Hochschule für nachhaltige Entwicklung Eberswalde. On 23 November 1877 the first German telephone line was established in the town.

=== 20th century ===
The world's first radio concert was broadcast from Eberswalde in 1923. Werner Forssmann received his 1956 Nobel Prize in Physiology or Medicine for his 1929 experiments with cardiac catheterization performed on his own heart, whilst resident in Eberswalde.

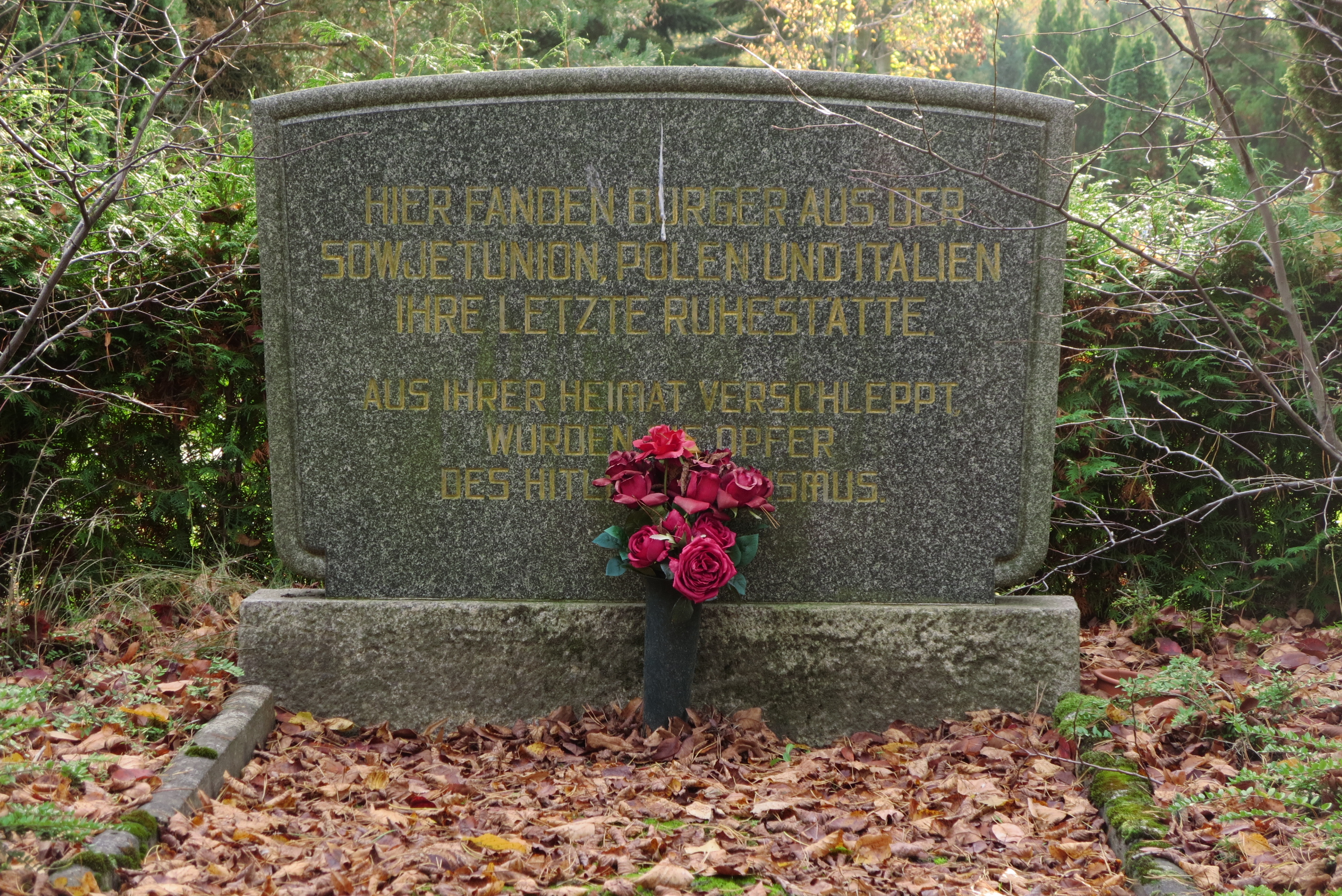
Mass grave of Soviet, Polish and Italian victims of Nazi Germany

In the 1938 pogroms, Eberswalde's synagogue was destroyed. During World War II, several factories employed forced labourers. There were six forced labour subcamps of the Stalag III-C prisoner-of-war camp in the town. In 1944–1945, Eberswalde and Finow were locations of two subcamps of the Ravensbrück concentration camp, in which over 1,400 women, mostly Polish, Russian, Italian, Ukrainian, but also French, Yugoslav, Dutch, Hungarian, Danish, Greek, Belgian, Luxembourgish, Austrian and German, were imprisoned and used for forced labour. The women were subjected to malnutrition, poor hygiene conditions, beatings and tortures. A brief dysentery and tuberculosis epidemic broke out in the Eberswalde subcamp, and dead prisoners were sent for cremation to the main Ravensbrück camp. At the end of the war, the town center was attacked by the German Luftwaffe, in an attempt to delay the Soviet advance. After learning that Soviet forces had taken Eberswalde without a fight, Adolf Hitler admitted defeat in his underground bunker and stated that suicide was his only recourse.

From 1947 to 1952, Eberswalde was part of the State of Brandenburg, from 1952 to 1990 of the Bezirk Frankfurt of East Germany and since 1990 again of Brandenburg.

In 1970 Eberswalde was merged with the settlement of Finow to create Eberswalde-Finow. In 1993 the name Eberswalde was restored.

== Demography ==
Development of population since 1875 within the current boundaries (blue Line: population; dotted line: comparison to population development of Brandenburg state; grey background: time of Nazi rule; red hackground: time of communist rule)

Recent population development and projections (population development before 2011 census (blue line); recent population development according to the Census in Germany in 2011 (blue bordered line); official projections for 2005-2030 (yellow line); for 2014-2030 (red line); for 2017-2030 (scarlet line)

Eberswalde: Population development
within the current boundaries (2019)

Year	Pop.	±% p.a.
1875	14,270	—
1890	21,023	+2.62%
1910	34,813	+2.55%
1925	39,064	+0.77%
1933	41,435	+0.74%
1939	49,709	+3.08%
1946	40,771	−2.79%

Year	Pop.	±% p.a.
1950	41,477	+0.43%
1964	44,005	+0.42%
1971	47,171	+1.00%
1981	53,922	+1.35%
1985	54,931	+0.46%
1990	53,601	−0.49%
1995	49,212	−1.69%

Year	Pop.	±% p.a.
2000	44,623	−1.94%
2005	41,831	−1.28%
2010	40,944	−0.43%
2015	39,303	−0.81%
2020	40,965	+0.83%
2025	41,867	+0.44%

== Mayor ==
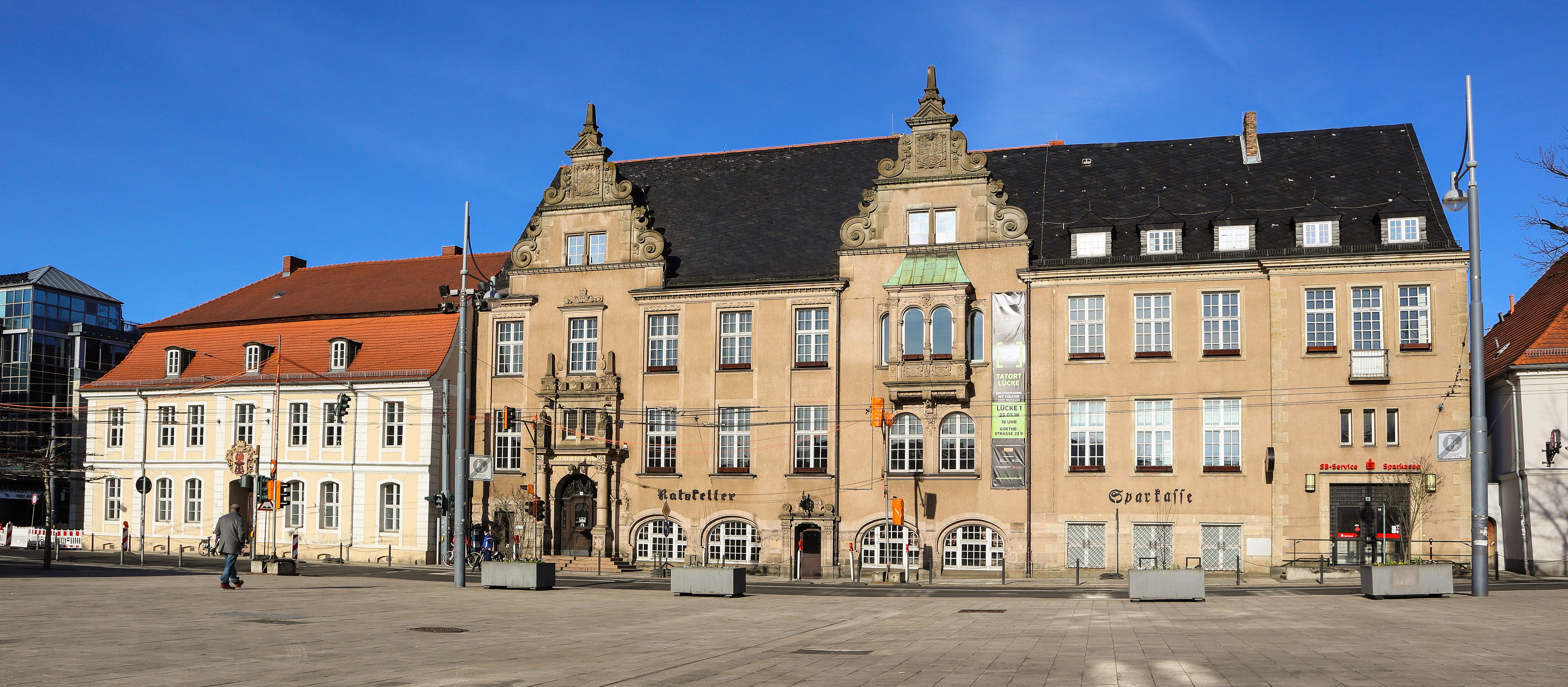
Town hall

On 3 April 2022 Götz Hermann (independent) was elected mayor of Eberswalde with 61.9% of the votes. He replaced Friedhelm Boginski (FDP), who was mayor since 2006 and left in 2021 due to his election as Member of Parliament.

The previous mayor Reinhard Schulz (independent) was unelected in July 2006 with 91,2 % of the votes.

== Transport ==
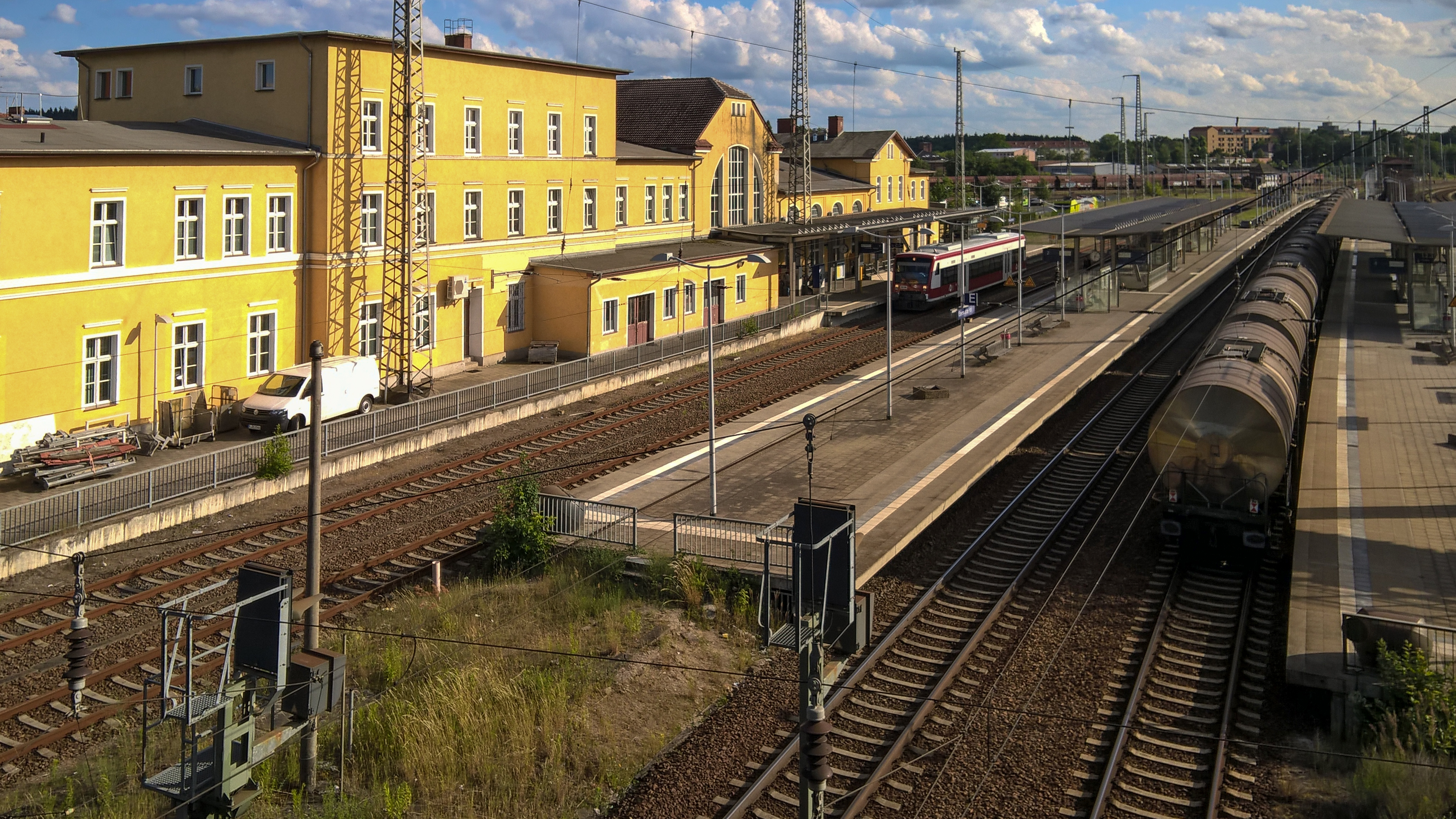
Main railway station

Eberswalde has access to the federal highways (Bundesstraße) B 2 and B 167 and the highway (Autobahn) A 11-E28. Eberswalde station is located on the Berlin–Szczecin railway line that first connected Eberswalde and Berlin in 1842. It is the starting point of the railway lines to Templin and Frankfurt (Oder) and was terminus of the Eberswalde-Finowfurter-Eisenbahn (EFE) to Finowfurt until it was discontinued.

The town and its industrial areas are on the Oder Havel Canal and Finow Canal waterways. The airfield Flugplatz Finow is a former Soviet Air Force base that was handed over to civil use on 11 May 1993.

The town had a tram service until 1940, when trams were replaced by trolleybuses. Eberswalde is one of only three towns in Germany where trolleybuses are still in operation, along with Solingen and Esslingen.

== Economy ==
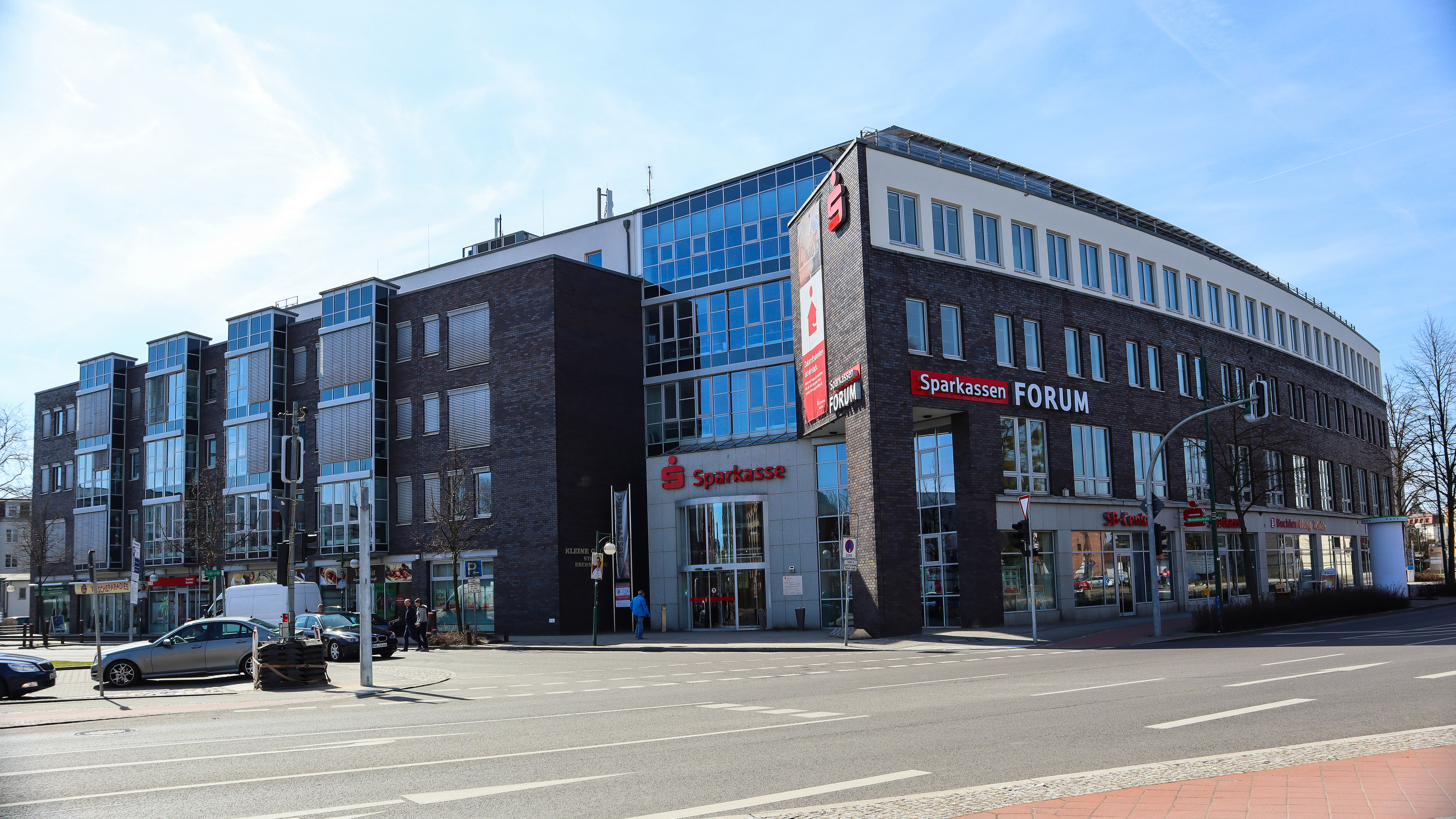
Bank Sparkasse Barnim

While Eberswalde was renowned for its thriving heavy industry in the past, since the fall of the wall, it has fallen upon harder times. As the East German government fell, state support vanished, and factories had to suddenly compete with more efficient firms in the West. As a result, many factories in Eberswalde went under, and visitors can see the remnants of these abandoned plants across town. Like many former East German towns, Eberswalde has since struggled with unemployment, and many have left the region in search of work elsewhere. Consequently, many of the huge Soviet-Bloc style apartment complexes in Eberswalde (most notably the Brandenburgisches Viertel) are becoming empty, and are slowly being razed.

== Culture ==
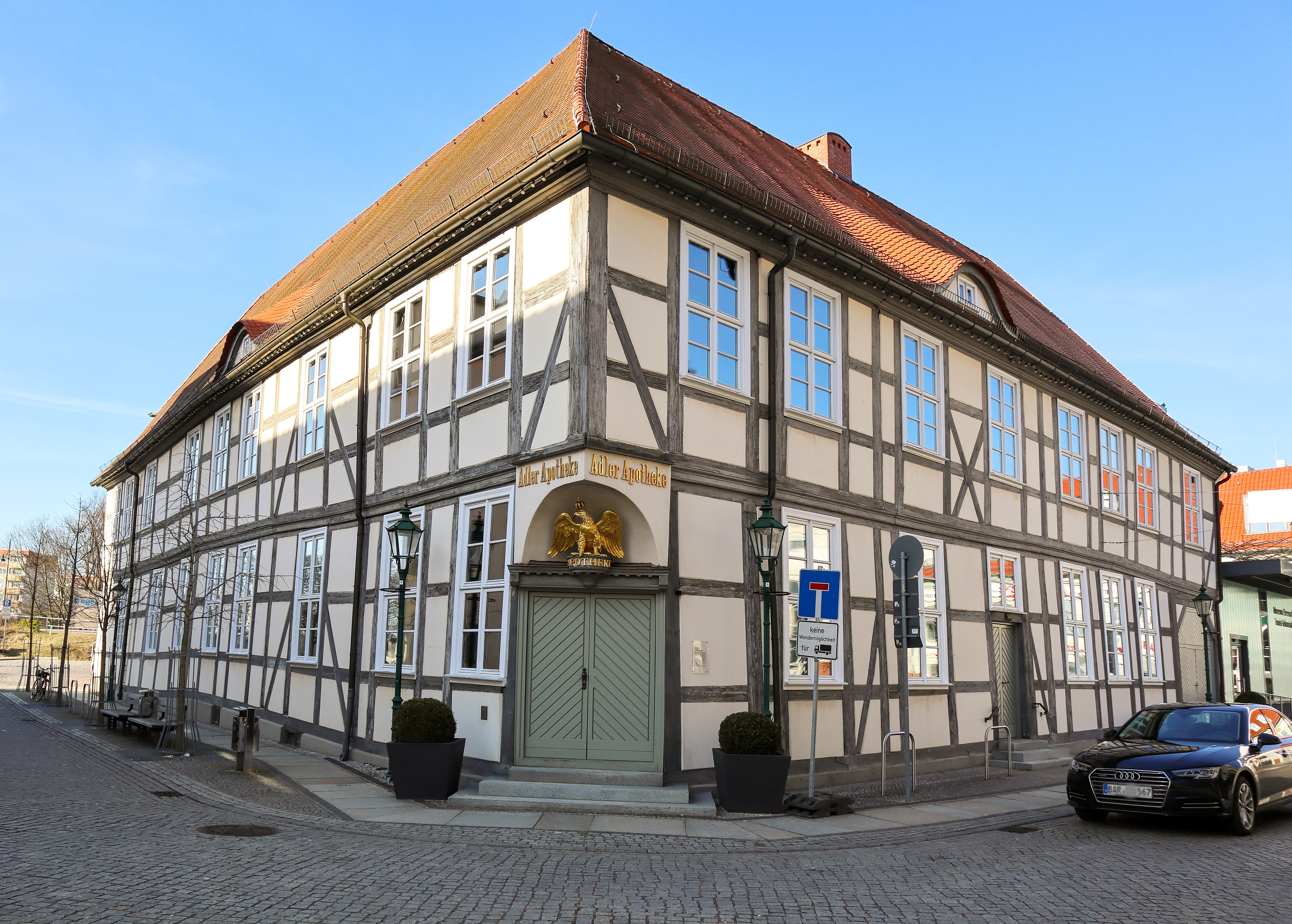
Museum of the town with tourist info

=== Festivals ===
Carnival Compared to other towns of the region, Eberswalde has quite a huge Carnival society. It was brought to Eberswalde from Bavaria and from the Rhineland, both are standing for different Carnival traditions. Because of this Carnival is celebrated in two independent festivals at the same time called Karneval and Fasching.

Rock me Magdalena

Rock me Magdalena is a rock concert in the Maria Magdalena church of Eberswalde, taking place every 25 December.

Filmfest Eberswalde

Since 2004 there is the annual Eberswalde Movie Festival for Independent Film and Documentaries.

=== Culinary traditions ===
There are some foods that are associated with Eberswalde. The most important of them are Eberswalder Spritzkuchen (a special pastry that was invented in Eberswalde in 1832) and Eberswalder Würstchen (sausages).

=== Language ===
The tongue spoken in the region of Eberswalde is often called Eberswalder Kanaldeutsch (canal German). It is not an independent German dialect, but a very extreme mix of the Berlin Dialect and a bit of East Low German. Other forms of Kanaldeutsch, that are derived from the Eberswalde form, nearly developed back to the Berlin Dialect. That's why Eberswalder Kanaldeutsch is the only one that is in fact sometimes considered as an independent German dialect.

=== Gardens ===
The Forstbotanischer Garten Eberswalde is a historic botanical garden and arboretum.

== Religion ==
=== Evangelical ===
The evangelical city parish of Eberswalde is part of the Evangelical Church Berlin-Brandenburg-Silesian Upper Lusatia (EKBO) and maintains three churches.

=== Catholic ===
Eberswalde is seat of a deanery since 1938.

== Notable people ==
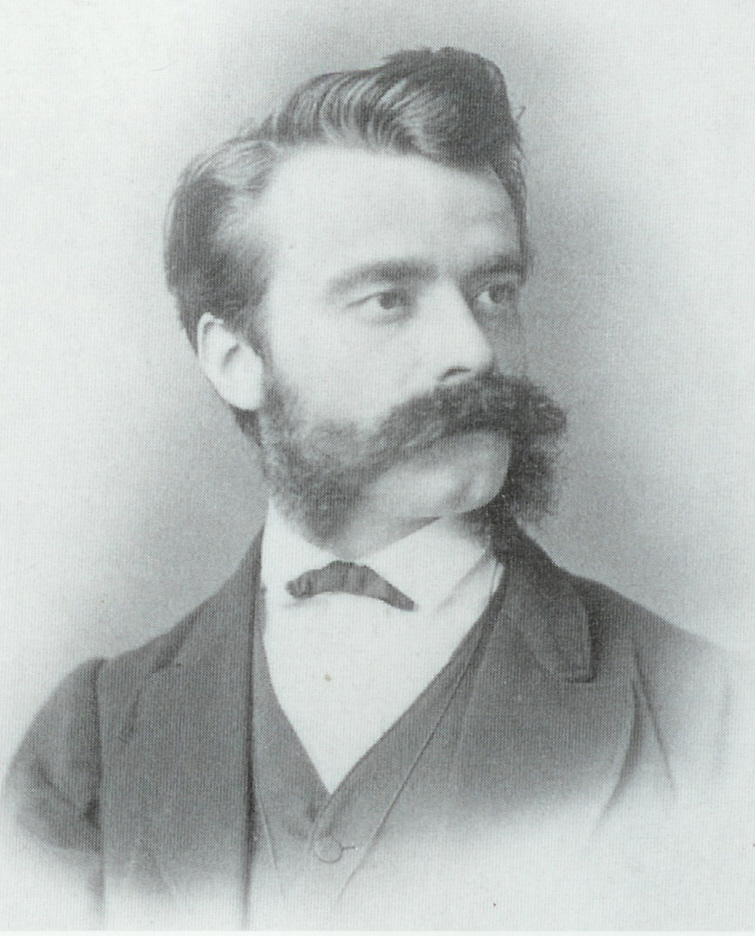
Robert Hartig, forestry scientist

- Bernard Altum (1824–1900), zoologist
- Bernhard Danckelmann (1831–1901), forestry scientist
- Hans-Jürgen Döscher (born 1943), historian
- Hans Dresig (1937–2018), professor of technical mechanics
- Werner Forßmann (1904–1979), doctor, Nobel Prize laureate
- Robert Hartig (1839–1901), forestry scientist
- Erwin Hagedorn (1952–1972), known as child murderer of Eberswalde
- Ralf Hauptmann (born 1968), football player
- Candida Höfer (born 1944), photographer
- Erich Lindemann (1894–1934), doctor and leading member of the Reichsbund Jewish Veterans and one of the victims of the so-called Night of long knives
- Friedrich Mieth (1888–1944), General of Infantry
- Albrecht Milnik (born 1931), forestry scientist
- Christiane Nord (born 1943), translation scholar
- Wilhelm Pfeil (1783–1859), forestry scientist
- Julius Theodor Christian Ratzeburg (1801–1871), zoologist, entomologist and forestry scientist
- Albert Richter (1909–2007), forestry scientist
- Rudolf Schmidt (1875–1943), city engineer
- Ursula Werner (born 1943), actress
- Paul Wunderlich (1927–2010), painter and sculptor of the Fantastic Realism
- Eva Zeller (1923–2022), author

== Coat of arms ==
The emblem shows a green oak tree and above the oak tree a red eagle. Towards the oak's bole stand two black boars. The flag of Eberswalde is a black/white/green tricolour with the crest in the middle.

== Twin towns – sister cities ==
Eberswalde is twinned with:

- Delmenhorst, Germany
- Gorzów Wielkopolski, Poland
- Herlev, Denmark

== Gallery ==
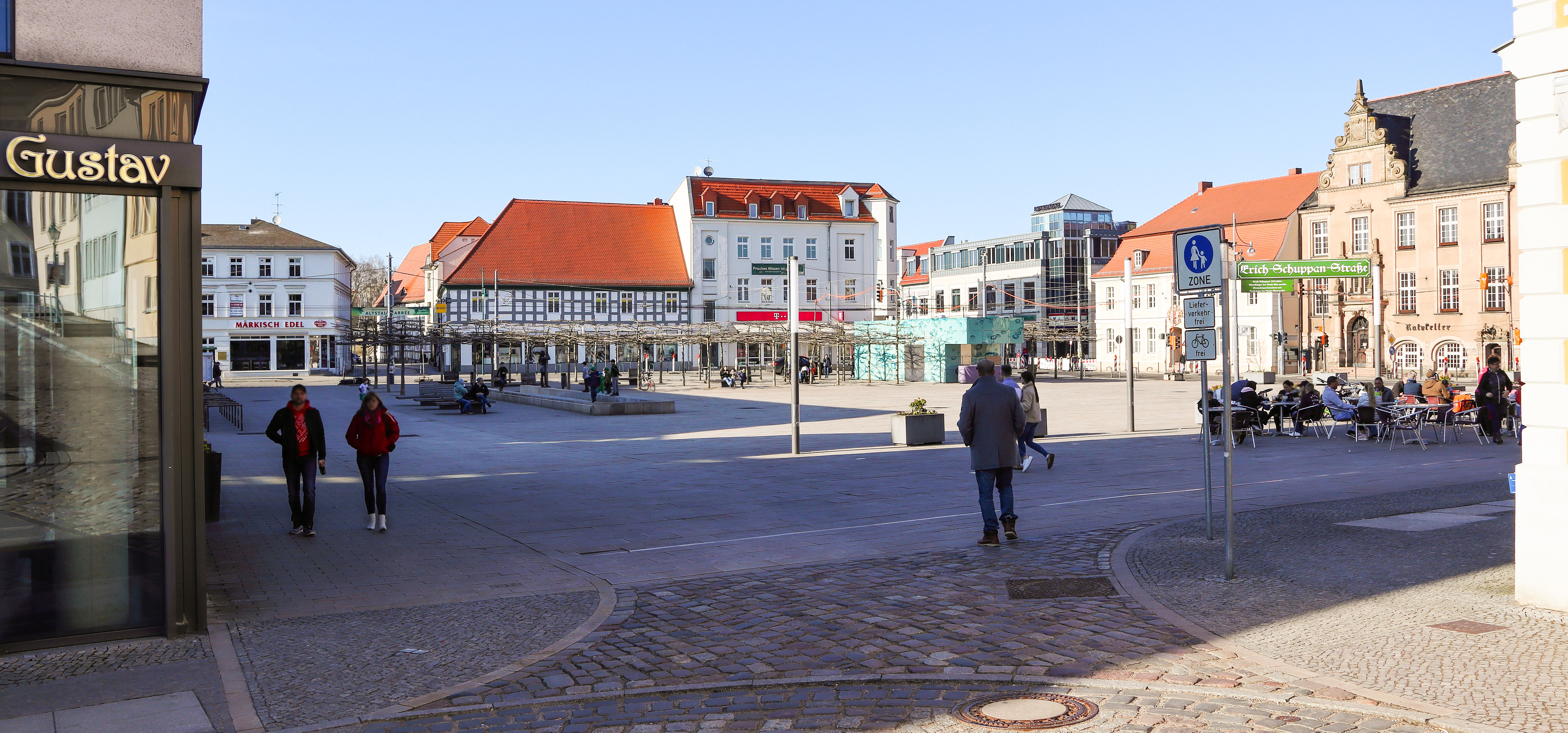
Marketplace

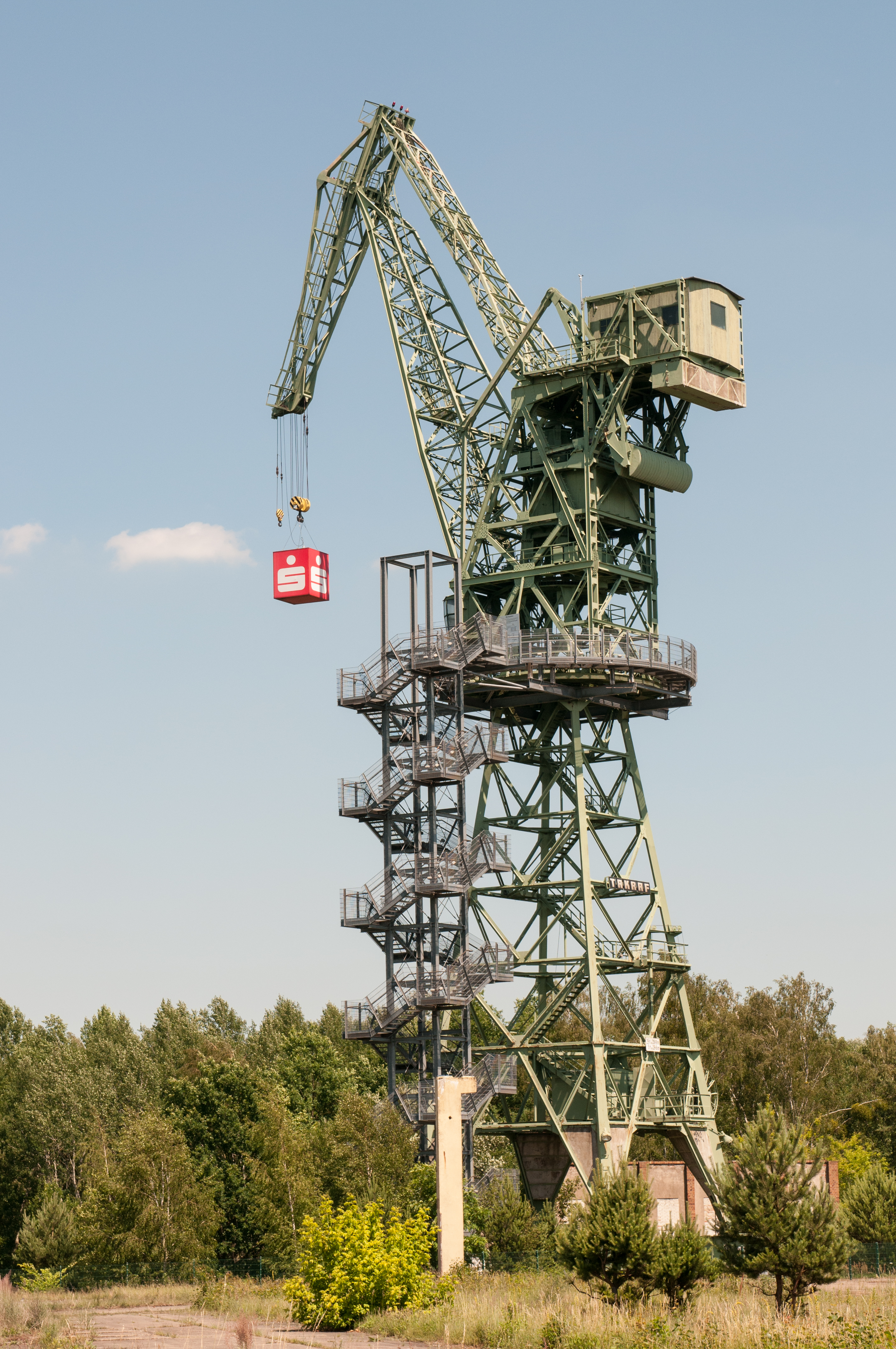
Crane in Eberswalde

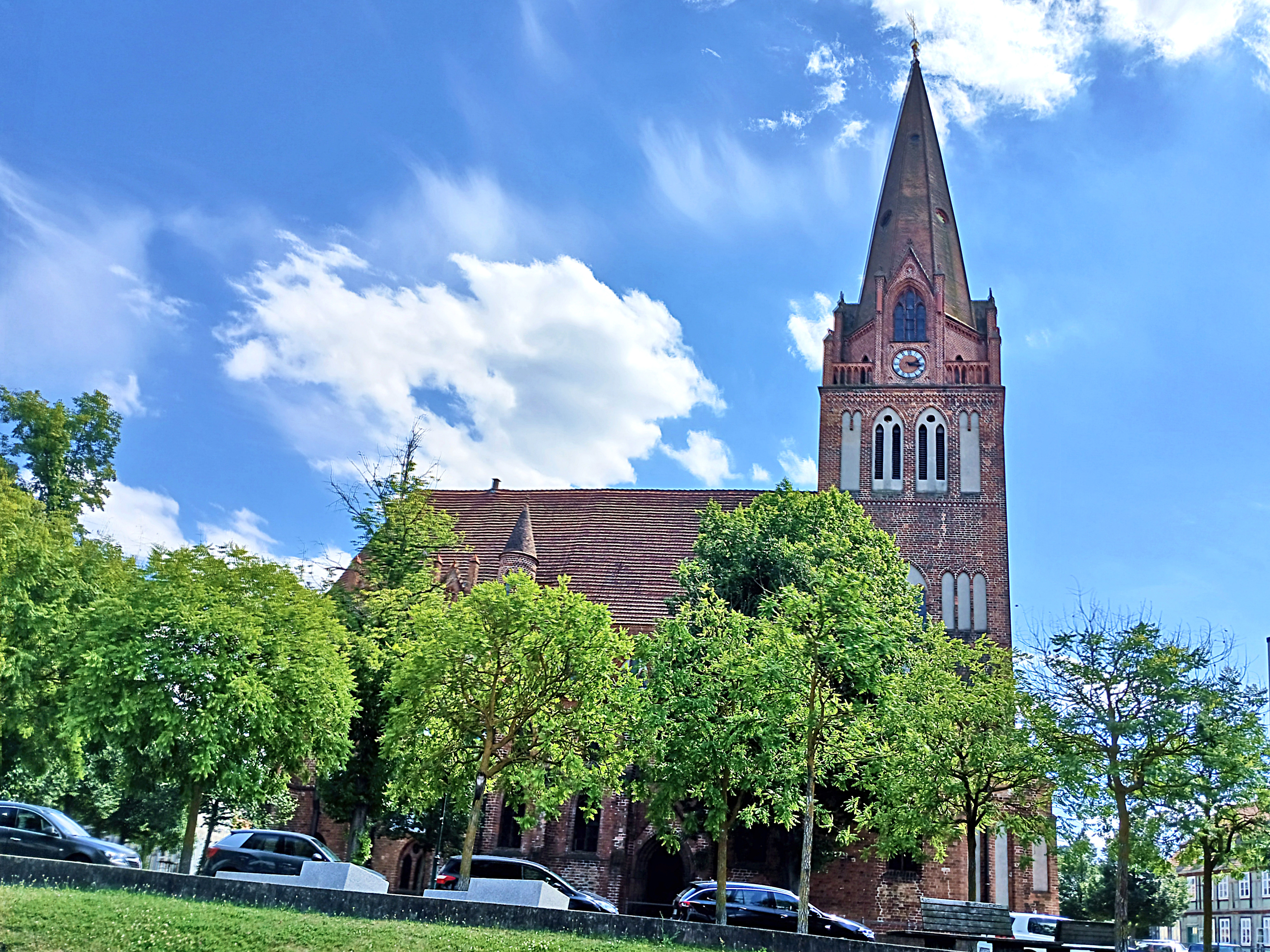
Mary Magdalene church

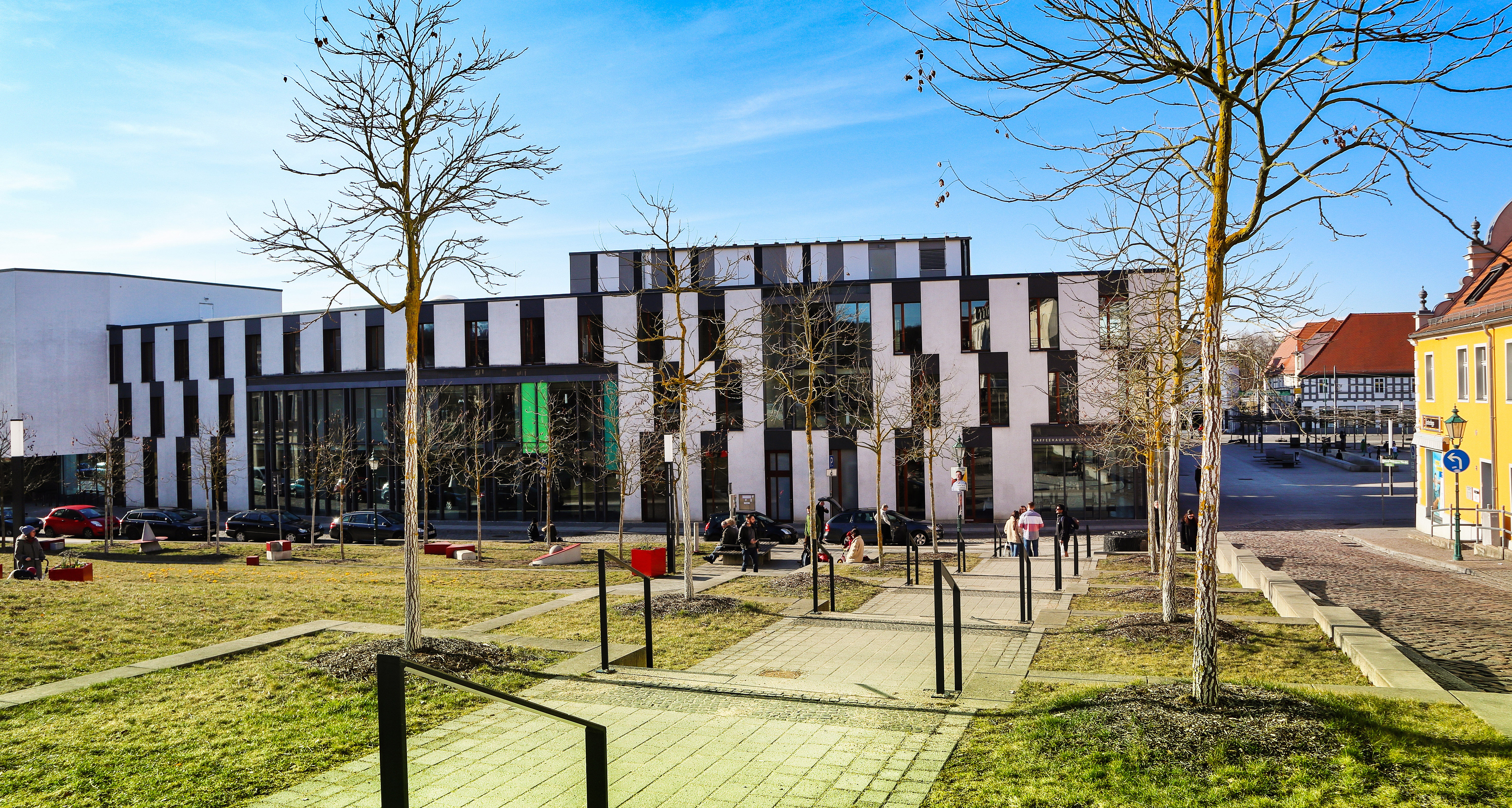
View onto the building of the county government

== See also ==
- Experimental Radio Station Eberswalde
