= Experimental Radio Station Eberswalde =

Pioneer installation for radio

Coordinates: 52.8402°N 13.8331°E

The Experimental Radio Station Eberswalde was an experimental radio station of the company C. Lorenz AG founded in Eberswalde, Germany in 1909.

== Technical details ==
As an antenna system, it used an umbrella aerial, which was mounted on a 70-metre-high, guyed central mast and supported at the corners by sixteen 30-metre-high timber masts. The central mast was wood-latticed with a weight of 10.2 tons, guyed in 5 levels. As transmitters, arc and machine transmitters were used, which served mainly for the purpose of telegraphy.

== History ==
Between January 1923 and January 1925, music transmissions were also done, although the station was never a regular broadcasting station. Starting in 1924, the station was used for short wave experiments. In 1928, the first experimental radio beacon was built on the Experimental Radio Station Eberswalde. It operated in the medium-wave band and used a triangle plane aerial, which was hung up on three 28-metre-tall (92 ft) masts. Starting in the middle of the 1930s, the station was gradually shut down. In 1939, the entire antenna system including the central mast was dismantled. Starting in 1942, the buildings were used for a research centre for investigating the production of fuel from peat. From 1954 to 1963, the facilities served the forest-economy faculty of the Humboldt University of Berlin. The facilities are unused today.
