= Finow Canal =

Canal in Brandenburg, Germany

Coordinates: 52°51′N 13°24′E

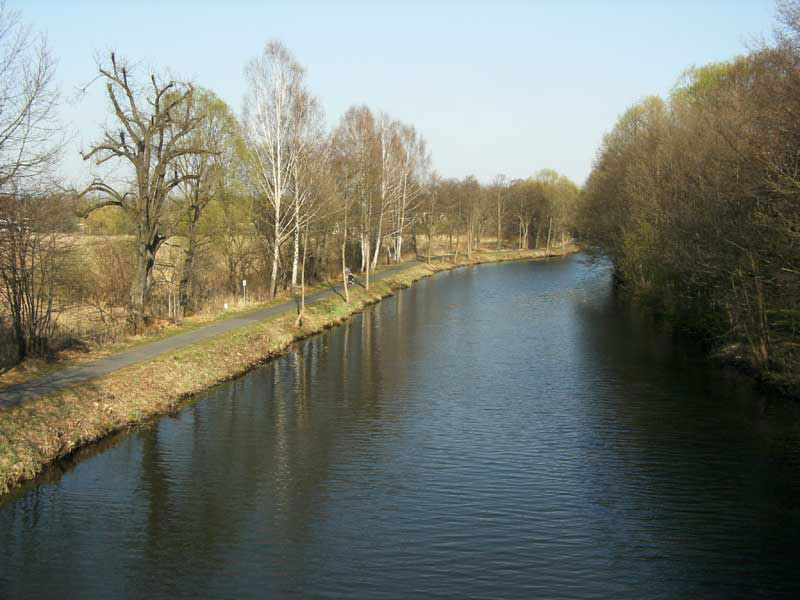
The Finow Canal

The Finow Canal (German Finowkanal) is one of the oldest artificial waterways in Europe. Construction began in 1605. The channel, about 50 kilometres (31 mi) long, is in the German state of Brandenburg in the Barnim district. It was built for the first time in 1605 and connects the Oder and Havel rivers. The Ragöse river flows into the canal.

After completion of the straighter Oder–Havel Canal in 1914, the economic relevance of the Finow Canal decreased. Today it is mainly used for tourism. The Experimental Radio Station Eberswalde is also at the Finow Canal.
