= Oder–Havel Canal =

Canal in Germany

Coordinates: 52°52′N 14°02′E

- Interactive map of Oder–Havel Canal

Specifications
- Length: 82.8 km (51 mi)

History
- Construction began: 1908
- Date completed: 1914

Geography
- Start point: Oder River, near Cedynia, at the border between Germany and Poland
- End point: Havel, near Berlin, Germany

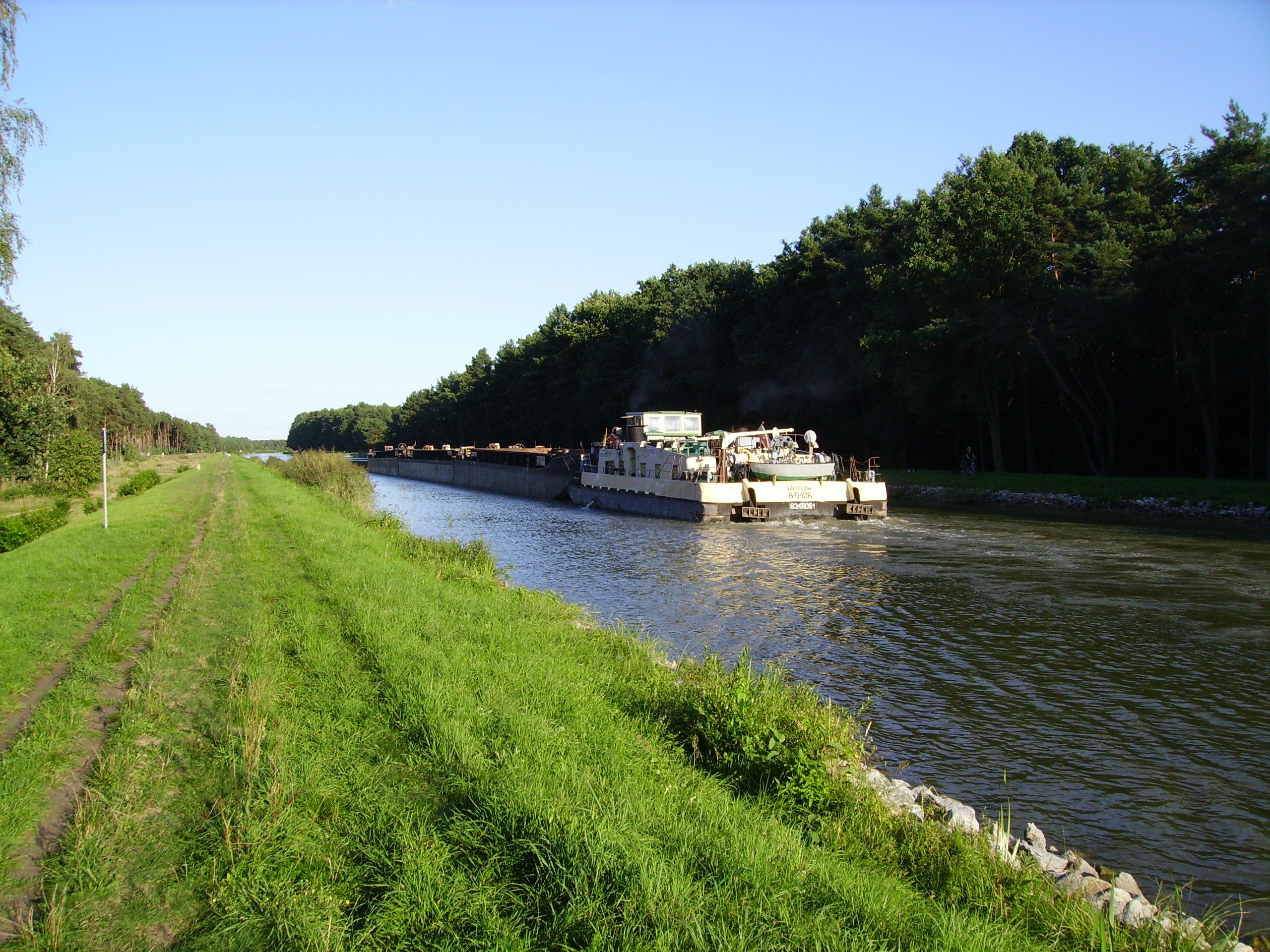
Oder-Havel Canal near Eberswalde

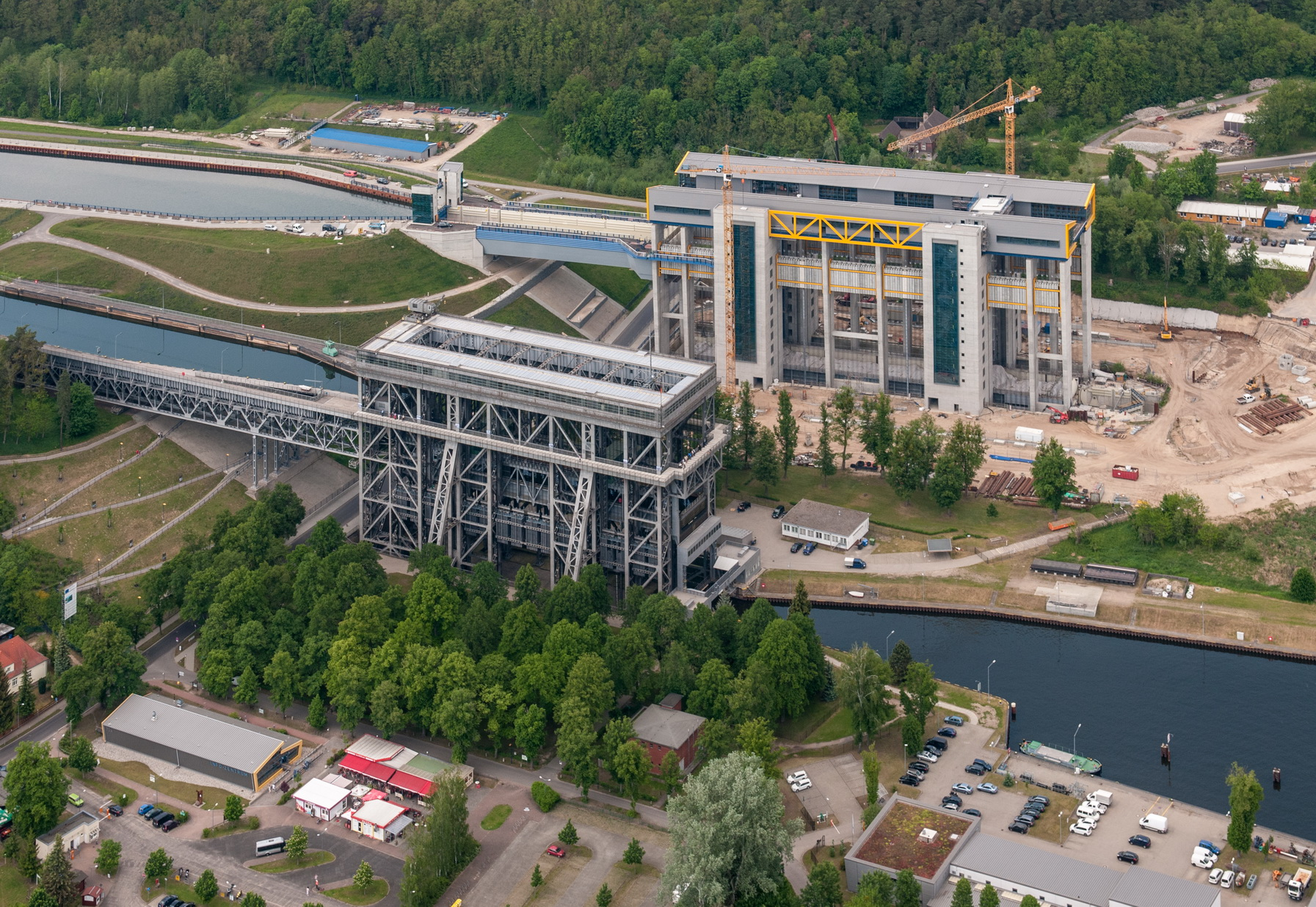
Ship lift Niederfinow

The Oder–Havel Canal is a German canal built between 1908 and 1914, originally known as the Hohenzollern Canal, mostly replacing the Finow Canal. Together with Hohensaaten-Friedrichsthaler Wasserstraße, the Oderhaltung and the Schwedter Querfahrt it forms the Havel-Oder-Wasserstraße. It runs from the town of Cedynia near the city of Szczecin on the Oder River between Germany and Poland to the Havel, a tributary of the Elbe, near Berlin. It is 82.8 kilometres (51.4 mi) long, and 33 metres (36 yd) wide.

Map of Oder–Havel Canal

In 1934 a ship lift was built on the canal, near Niederfinow. It vertical lift was 36 metres (118 ft). The dimensions of the caisson are 85 m × 12 m × 2.5 m (278.9 ft × 39.4 ft × 8.2 ft). It could lift vessels of up to 1000 tonnes displacement.

== History ==
The assumed start of the actual Oder–Havel Canal is the current mouth of the Oranienburger Havel. It leads through the Lehnitzsee, which previously did not belong to the Havel, and reaches the Lehnitzschleuse. Most of the canal follows the former Malz Canal and then replaces the older Finow Canal up to its eastern end. Its top parting extends from the headwater of the Lehnitz lock to the Niederfinow boat lift. The natural resources of the catchment areas of the Havel and the advertising water and, in the event of drought, the Müritz-Havel waterway and the Elde are used to supply the water to the vertex.
