= Märkisch-Oderland – Barnim II =

Federal electoral district of Germany

59 Märkisch-Oderland – Barnim II
- Electoral district for the Bundestag
- Märkisch-Oderland – Barnim II in 2025
- State: Brandenburg
- Population: 279,400 (2019)
- Electorate: 230,391 (2021)
- Major settlements: Bernau bei Berlin; Strausberg; Panketal
- Area: 2,463.6 km^{2}

Current electoral district
- Created: 2002
- Party: AfD
- Member: René Springer
- Elected: 2025

Märkisch-Oderland – Barnim II is an electoral constituency (German: Wahlkreis) represented in the Bundestag. It elects one member via first-past-the-post voting. Under the current constituency numbering system, it is designated as constituency 59. It is located in eastern Brandenburg, comprising the Märkisch-Oderland district and southern parts of the Barnim district.

Märkisch-Oderland – Barnim II was created for the 2002 federal election. From 2021 to 2025, it was represented by Simona Koß of the Social Democratic Party (SPD). Since 2025 it has been represented by René Springer of the AfD.

== Geography ==
Märkisch-Oderland – Barnim II is located in eastern Brandenburg. As of the 2021 federal election, it comprises the entirety of the Märkisch-Oderland district and the municipalities of Ahrensfelde, Bernau bei Berlin, Panketal, and Werneuchen from the Barnim district.

== History ==
Märkisch-Oderland – Barnim II was created in 2002 and contained parts of the abolished constituencies of Eberswalde – Bernau – Bad Freienwalde and Fürstenwalde – Strausberg – Seelow. In the 2002 and 2005 elections, it was constituency 59 in the numbering system. In the 2009 election, it was number 60. Since the 2013 election, it has been number 59.

Originally, the constituency comprised the districts of Märkisch-Oderland and the municipalities of Ahrensfelde, Bernau bei Berlin, Wandlitz, and Werneuchen and Ämter of Pakental, Biesenthal-Barnim from the Barnim district. Upon the abolition of the Panketal Amt ahead of the 2005 election, the former municipality of Börnicke was transferred out of the constituency. At the same time, it gained the Marienwerder and the former municipality of Zerpenschleuse. In the 2017 election, the municipality of Wandlitz and the Biesenthal-Barnim Amt were transferred out of the constituency.

| Election | No. | Name | Borders |
|---|---|---|---|
| 2002 | 59 | Märkisch-Oderland – Barnim II | Märkisch-Oderland district; Barnim district (only Ahrensfelde, Bernau bei Berlin, Wandlitz, and Werneuchen municipalities and Pakental and Biesenthal-Barnim Ämter) |
| 2005 | 59 | Märkisch-Oderland – Barnim II | Märkisch-Oderland district; Barnim district (only Ahrensfelde, Bernau bei Berlin, Wandlitz, and Werneuchen municipalities and Biesenthal-Barnim Amt) |
| 2009 | 60 | Märkisch-Oderland – Barnim II | Märkisch-Oderland district; Barnim district (only Ahrensfelde, Bernau bei Berlin, Wandlitz, and Werneuchen municipalities and Biesenthal-Barnim Amt) |
| 2013 | 59 | Märkisch-Oderland – Barnim II | Märkisch-Oderland district; Barnim district (only Ahrensfelde, Bernau bei Berlin, Wandlitz, and Werneuchen municipalities and Biesenthal-Barnim Amt) |
| 2017 | 59 | Märkisch-Oderland – Barnim II | Märkisch-Oderland district; Barnim district (only Ahrensfelde, Bernau bei Berlin, and Werneuchen municipalities) |
| 2021 | 59 | Märkisch-Oderland – Barnim II | Märkisch-Oderland district; Barnim district (only Ahrensfelde, Bernau bei Berlin, and Werneuchen municipalities) |
| 2025 | 59 | Märkisch-Oderland – Barnim II | Märkisch-Oderland district; Barnim district (only Ahrensfelde, Bernau bei Berlin, and Werneuchen municipalities) |

== Members ==
The constituency was first represented by Petra Bierwirth of the Social Democratic Party (SPD) from 2002 to 2009. The Left won the constituency in 2009, and represented by Dagmar Enkelmann. The Christian Democratic Union (CDU)'s candidate Hans-Georg von der Marwitz was elected in 2013, and re-elected in 2017. Simona Koß regained it for the SPD in 2021.

| Election | Member | Party | % |
|---|---|---|---|
| 2002 | Petra Bierwirth | SPD | 42.9 |
| 2005 | Petra Bierwirth | SPD | 35.4 |
| 2009 | Dagmar Enkelmann | LINKE | 37.0 |
| 2013 | Hans-Georg von der Marwitz | CDU | 34.0 |
| 2017 | Hans-Georg von der Marwitz | CDU | 28.4 |
| 2021 | Simona Koß | SPD | 24.8 |
| 2025 | René Springer | AfD | 36.1 |

== Election results ==
=== 2025 election ===
Federal election (2025): Märkisch-Oderland – Barnim II
| Notes: | Blue background denotes the winner of the electorate vote. Pink background denotes a candidate elected from their party list. Yellow background denotes an electorate win by a list member, or other incumbent. A ✓ or ✗ denotes status of any incumbent, win or lose respectively. | | | | | | |
| Party | Candidate | Votes | % | ±% | Party votes | % | ±% |
|---|---|---|---|---|---|---|---|
| AfD | René Springer | 69,016 | 36.1 | ▲17.8 | 64,893 | 33.8 | ▲15.6 |
| SPD | ✗ Simona Koß | 35,785 | 18.7 | ▼6.0 | 25,134 | 13.1 | ▼14.8 |
| CDU | Rene Kaplick | 34,597 | 18.1 | ▼5.3 | 32,399 | 16.9 | ▲1.8 |
| BSW | | | | | 23,585 | 12.3 | New |
| Left | Carolin Schönwald | 25,444 | 13.3 | ▲0.9 | 21,638 | 11.3 | ▲1.0 |
| Greens | Anton Wulke | 7,625 | 4.0 | ▼2.8 | 11,132 | 5.8 | ▼2.2 |
| FW | Jörg Arnold | 6,648 | 3.5 | New | 3,329 | 1.7 | ▼1.8 |
| FDP | Wolfgang Schure | 4,693 | 2.5 | ▼4.6 | 5,552 | 2.9 | ▼5.7 |
| PARTEI | Marco Kirstein | 3,048 | 1.6 | ▼0.9 | 1,842 | 1.0 | ▼0.4 |
| BD | René Elend | 2,194 | 1.1 | New | 717 | 0.4 | New |
| Volt | Florian Dickau | 2,065 | 1.1 | New | 1,466 | 0.8 | ▲0.5 |
| MLPD | | | | | 135 | 0.1 | 0.0 |
| Informal votes | | 1,917 | | | 1,210 | | |
| Total valid votes | | 191,155 | | | 191,822 | | |
| Turnout | | 193,032 | 83.3 | ▲6.5 | | | |
| AfD gain from SPD | Majority | 33,231 | 17.4 | N/A | | | |

=== 2021 election ===
Federal election (2021): Märkisch-Oderland – Barnim II
| Notes: | Blue background denotes the winner of the electorate vote. Pink background denotes a candidate elected from their party list. Yellow background denotes an electorate win by a list member, or other incumbent. A ✓ or ✗ denotes status of any incumbent, win or lose respectively. | | | | | | |
| Party | Candidate | Votes | % | ±% | Party votes | % | ±% |
|---|---|---|---|---|---|---|---|
| SPD | Simona Koß | 43,117 | 24.8 | ▲8.9 | 48,712 | 27.9 | ▲12.5 |
| CDU | Sabine Buder | 40,804 | 23.4 | ▼5.0 | 26,254 | 15.0 | ▼10.1 |
| AfD | Lars Günther | 31,929 | 18.3 | ▼1.9 | 31,820 | 18.2 | ▼2.5 |
| Left | Niels-Olaf Lüders | 21,700 | 12.5 | ▼10.0 | 18,004 | 10.3 | ▼10.3 |
| FDP | Mirko Dachroth | 12,270 | 7.0 | ▲2.8 | 14,939 | 8.6 | ▲2.0 |
| Greens | Kim Stattaus | 11,742 | 6.7 | ▲1.4 | 13,954 | 8.0 | ▲3.3 |
| FW | | | | | 6,101 | 3.5 | ▲2.0 |
| Tierschutzpartei | | | | | 5,360 | 3.1 | ▲1.1 |
| PARTEI | Mario Schlauß | 4,425 | 2.5 | | 2,393 | 1.4 | 0.0 |
| dieBasis | Dirk Herzog | 3,750 | 2.2 | | 2,865 | 1.6 | |
| Independent | Ralf Lorenz | 2,349 | 1.3 | | | | |
| Unabhängige | | | | | 1,021 | 0.6 | |
| Independent | Olaf Schütz | 788 | 0.5 | | | | |
| Pirates | | | | | 695 | 0.4 | |
| Volt | | | | | 500 | 0.3 | |
| NPD | | | | | 476 | 0.3 | ▼0.5 |
| Team Todenhöfer | | | | | 378 | 0.2 | |
| ÖDP | Roman Kutschick | 737 | 0.4 | | 345 | 0.2 | 0.0 |
| DKP | Hans-Günther Schleife | 598 | 0.3 | ▼0.3 | 371 | 0.2 | ▼0.1 |
| Humanists | | | | | 232 | 0.1 | |
| MLPD | | | | | 78 | 0.0 | 0.0 |
| Informal votes | | 2,856 | | | 2,567 | | |
| Total valid votes | | 174,209 | | | 174,498 | | |
| Turnout | | 177,065 | 76.9 | ▲1.8 | | | |
| SPD gain from CDU | Majority | 2,313 | 1.4 | | | | |

=== 2017 election ===
Federal election (2017): Märkisch-Oderland – Barnim II
| Notes: | Blue background denotes the winner of the electorate vote. Pink background denotes a candidate elected from their party list. Yellow background denotes an electorate win by a list member, or other incumbent. A ✓ or ✗ denotes status of any incumbent, win or lose respectively. | | | | | | |
| Party | Candidate | Votes | % | ±% | Party votes | % | ±% |
|---|---|---|---|---|---|---|---|
| CDU | ✓ Hans-Georg von der Marwitz | 47,594 | 28.4 | ▼5.5 | 42,113 | 25.1 | ▼7.0 |
| Left | Kerstin Kühn | 37,721 | 22.5 | ▼10.4 | 34,632 | 20.7 | ▼5.8 |
| AfD | Andreas Schuffenhauer | 33,915 | 20.2 | | 34,701 | 20.7 | ▲14.3 |
| SPD | Stephen Ruebsam | 26,526 | 15.8 | ▼4.6 | 25,908 | 15.4 | ▼6.5 |
| Greens | Jan Sommer | 8,972 | 5.4 | ▲2.0 | 7,800 | 4.7 | ▲0.5 |
| FDP | Mirko Dachroth | 7,111 | 4.2 | ▲3.1 | 11,007 | 6.6 | ▲4.3 |
| Tierschutzpartei | | | | | 3,354 | 2.0 | |
| FW | Winfried Dreger | 4,617 | 2.8 | ▲1.3 | 2,566 | 1.5 | ▲0.3 |
| PARTEI | | | | | 2,303 | 1.4 | |
| NPD | | | | | 1,243 | 0.7 | ▼1.7 |
| DKP | Werner Grünwald | 1,149 | 0.7 | | 445 | 0.3 | |
| BGE | | | | | 737 | 0.4 | |
| DM | | | | | 486 | 0.3 | |
| ÖDP | | | | | 296 | 0.2 | |
| MLPD | | | | | 105 | 0.1 | 0.0 |
| Informal votes | | 2,434 | | | 2,343 | | |
| Total valid votes | | 167,605 | | | 167,696 | | |
| Turnout | | 170,039 | 75.1 | ▲5.8 | | | |
| CDU hold | Majority | 9,873 | 5.9 | ▲4.8 | | | |

=== 2013 election ===
Federal election (2013): Märkisch-Oderland – Barnim II
| Notes: | Blue background denotes the winner of the electorate vote. Pink background denotes a candidate elected from their party list. Yellow background denotes an electorate win by a list member, or other incumbent. A ✓ or ✗ denotes status of any incumbent, win or lose respectively. | | | | | | |
| Party | Candidate | Votes | % | ±% | Party votes | % | ±% |
|---|---|---|---|---|---|---|---|
| CDU | Hans-Georg von der Marwitz | 58,210 | 34.0 | ▲10.4 | 55,340 | 32.3 | ▲10.7 |
| Left | ✗ Dagmar Enkelmann | 56,391 | 32.9 | ▼4.0 | 44,996 | 26.3 | ▼7.4 |
| SPD | Olaf Mangold | 34,745 | 20.3 | ▼2.5 | 37,323 | 21.8 | ▲0.2 |
| AfD | | | | | 10,981 | 6.4 | |
| Greens | Michael Jungclaus | 5,876 | 3.4 | ▼1.4 | 7,213 | 4.2 | ▼1.8 |
| NPD | Lore Liese | 5,804 | 3.4 | ▼0.2 | 4,246 | 2.5 | ▼0.1 |
| Pirates | Jonathan Dehn | 4,588 | 2.7 | | 3,968 | 2.3 | ▼0.3 |
| FW | Andreas Eißrig | 2,476 | 1.4 | | 2,135 | 1.2 | |
| FDP | Fritz Krause-Uhl | 1,887 | 1.1 | ▼5.5 | 3,816 | 2.2 | ▼6.8 |
| PRO | | | | | 861 | 0.5 | |
| Independent | René Büttner | 701 | 0.4 | | | | |
| Independent | Christel Focken | 493 | 0.3 | | | | |
| REP | | | | | 278 | 0.2 | ▼0.1 |
| MLPD | | | | | 166 | 0.1 | 0.0 |
| Informal votes | | 3,922 | | | 3,770 | | |
| Total valid votes | | 171,171 | | | 171,323 | | |
| Turnout | | 175,093 | 69.6 | ▲1.5 | | | |
| CDU gain from Left | Majority | 1,819 | 1.1 | | | | |

=== 2009 election ===
Federal election (2009): Märkisch-Oderland – Barnim II
| Notes: | Blue background denotes the winner of the electorate vote. Pink background denotes a candidate elected from their party list. Yellow background denotes an electorate win by a list member, or other incumbent. A ✓ or ✗ denotes status of any incumbent, win or lose respectively. | | | | | | |
| Party | Candidate | Votes | % | ±% | Party votes | % | ±% |
|---|---|---|---|---|---|---|---|
| Left | Dagmar Enkelmann | 62,523 | 37.0 | ▲3.9 | 56,938 | 33.6 | ▲3.9 |
| CDU | Hans-Georg von der Marwitz | 39,863 | 23.6 | ▲3.1 | 36,583 | 21.6 | ▲2.9 |
| SPD | Ravindra Gujjula | 38,441 | 22.7 | ▼12.6 | 36,544 | 21.6 | ▼13.1 |
| FDP | Guido Beier | 11,115 | 6.6 | ▲2.8 | 15,311 | 9.0 | ▲2.5 |
| Greens | Thomas Dyhr | 8,181 | 4.8 | ▲2.3 | 10,211 | 6.0 | ▲1.2 |
| NPD | Kersten Radzimanowski | 6,069 | 3.6 | ▲0.3 | 4,365 | 2.6 | ▼0.8 |
| Pirates | | | | | 4,515 | 2.7 | |
| Independent | Dirk Weßlau | 2,280 | 1.3 | | | | |
| DVU | | | | | 2,140 | 1.3 | |
| FWD | | | | | 1,730 | 1.0 | |
| Independent | Bernd Sommerau | 566 | 0.3 | | | | |
| REP | | | | | 419 | 0.3 | |
| BüSo | | | | | 327 | 0.2 | |
| MLPD | | | | | 209 | 0.1 | ▼0.1 |
| Informal votes | | 4,669 | | | 4,415 | | |
| Total valid votes | | 169,038 | | | 169,292 | | |
| Turnout | | 173,707 | 68.1 | ▼8.2 | | | |
| Left gain from SPD | Majority | 22,660 | 13.4 | | | | |

=== 2005 election ===
Federal election (2005):Märkisch-Oderland - Barnim II
| Notes: | Blue background denotes the winner of the electorate vote. Pink background denotes a candidate elected from their party list. Yellow background denotes an electorate win by a list member, or other incumbent. A ✓ or ✗ denotes status of any incumbent, win or lose respectively. | | | | | | |
| Party | Candidate | Votes | % | ±% | Party votes | % | ±% |
|---|---|---|---|---|---|---|---|
| SPD | Petra Bierwirth | 65,841 | 35.4 | ▼7.6 | 64,590 | 34.7 | ▼8.7 |
| Left | Dagmar Enkelmann | 61,604 | 33.1 | ▲8.4 | 55,493 | 29.8 | ▲9.1 |
| CDU | Dirk Homeyer | 38,074 | 20.4 | ▼0.7 | 34,858 | 18.7 | ▼2.4 |
| FDP | Detlef Grabert | 7,123 | 3.8 | ▼0.9 | 12,233 | 6.6 | ▲1.0 |
| NPD | Lars Beyer | 6,140 | 3.3 | | 6,290 | 3.4 | ▲1.9 |
| Greens | Georg Stockburger | 4,817 | 2.6 | ▼0.3 | 9,020 | 4.8 | ▲0.3 |
| GRAUEN | | | | | 2,192 | 1.2 | ▲0.6 |
| Independent | Peter Vida | 2,176 | 1.2 | | | | |
| 50Plus The Generation-Alliance | | | | | 1,285 | 0.7 | |
| Schill | Raimar Wendland | 444 | 0.2 | ▼3.4 | | | |
| MLPD | | | | | 380 | 0.2 | |
| Informal votes | | 3,383 | | | 3,261 | | |
| Total valid votes | | 186,219 | | | 186,341 | | |
| Turnout | | 189,602 | 76.3 | ▲2.1 | | | |
| SPD hold | Majority | 4,237 | 2.3 | | | | |
