= Petra Bierwirth =

German politician and member of the SPD

Member of the Bundestag
- In office 26 October 1998 – 27 October 2009
- Preceded by: Bodo Teichmann
- Succeeded by: Dagmar Enkelmann
- Constituency: Eberswalde – Bernau – Bad Freienwalde (1998–2002); Märkisch-Oderland – Barnim II (2002–2009)

Member of the Landtag of Brandenburg
- In office 11 October 1994 – 25 October 1998
- Preceded by: Multi-member district
- Succeeded by: Brigitte Oltmanns
- Constituency: State list

Personal details
- Born: 13 November 1960 (age 65) Dresden, East Germany
- Party: Social Democratic
- Children: 2
- Education: Leipzig University of Technology

Petra Bierwirth (born 13 November 1960) is a German politician and member of the SPD. She was a member of the Bundestag from 1998 to 2009.
