= Märkisch-Oderland III =

State electoral district of Germany

33: Märkisch-Oderland III
- Electoral district for the Landtag of Brandenburg
- Märkisch-Oderland III in 2024
- District: Märkisch-Oderland
- Electorate: 45,838 (2024)
- Major settlements: Altlandsberg, Bad Freienwalde, and Wriezen

Current electoral district
- Created: 1994
- Party: AfD
- Member: Lars Günther

Märkisch-Oderland III is an electoral constituency (German: Wahlkreis) represented in the Landtag of Brandenburg. It elects one member via first-past-the-post voting. Under the constituency numbering system, it is designated as constituency 33. It is located in within the district of Märkisch-Oderland.

== Geography ==
The constituency includes the towns of Altlandsberg, Bad Freienwalde, and Wriezen, the municipality of Fredersdorf-Vogelsdorf, and the districts of Barnim-Oderbruch and Falkenberg-Höhe.

There were 45,838 eligible voters in 2024.

== Members ==
Election	Member	Party	%
2004	Gerlinde Stobrawa	PDS	35.2
2009	Marco Büchel	Left	32.3
2014	Jutta Lieske	SPD	32.8
2019	Lars Günther	AfD	26.3
2024	Lars Günther	AfD	38.0

== Election results ==
=== 2024 election ===
State election (2024): Märkisch-Oderland III
Notes:	Blue background denotes the winner of the electorate vote. Pink background denotes a candidate elected from their party list. Yellow background denotes an electorate win by a list member, or other incumbent. A ✓ or ✗ denotes status of any incumbent, win or lose respectively.						
Party	Candidate	Votes	%	±%	Party votes	%	±%
AfD	✓ Lars Günther	12,524	38.1	▲11.7	11,424	34.5	▲6.8
SPD	Ravindra Gujjula	10,272	31.2	▲5.7	8,967	27.1	▲2.4
BSW					5,085	15.4	
CDU	Lipinski	4,868	14.8	▲1.1	3,475	10.5	▼3.4
BVB/FW	Zabel	2,412	7.3	▲0.6	966	2.9	▼2.6
Left	Gläser	1,699	5.2	▼13.6	881	2.7	▼1.04
Greens	Altvater	614	1.9	▼4.3	790	2.4	▼5.6
APT					684	2.1	▼0.3
FDP	Lich	514	1.6	▼1.1	249	0.8	▼2.8
Plus					228	0.7	▼0.3
DLW					166	0.5	
Values					119	0.4	
Third Way					44	0.1	
DKP					25	0.1	
Informal votes		474			274		
Total valid votes		32,903			33,103		
Turnout		33,377	72.8	▲13.7			
AfD hold	Majority	2,252	6.9	▲6.1			

=== 2019 election ===
State election (2019): Märkisch-Oderland III
Notes:	Blue background denotes the winner of the electorate vote. Pink background denotes a candidate elected from their party list. Yellow background denotes an electorate win by a list member, or other incumbent. A ✓ or ✗ denotes status of any incumbent, win or lose respectively.						
Party	Candidate	Votes	%	±%	Party votes	%	±%
AfD	Lars Günther	7,000	26.3	▲14.5	7,383	27.7	▲15.1
SPD	Ravindra Gujjula	6,786	25.5	▼7.3	6,577	24.7	▼9.0
Left	Marco Büchel	4,998	18.8	▼5.3	3,487	13.1	▼7.0
CDU	Laura Lazarus	3,643	13.7	▼8.1	3,703	13.9	▼7.9
BVB/FW	Knut Koall	1,800	6.8	▲3.0	1,472	5.5	▲3.3
Greens	Tatjana Rosenthal	1,650	6.2	▲2.7	2,123	8.0	▲3.9
FDP	Klaus Glaetzner	711	2.7	▲0.5	952	3.6	▲1.9
Tierschutzpartei					628	2.4	
Pirates					132	0.5	▼0.7
ÖDP					124	0.5	
V-Partei3					51	0.2	
Informal votes		347			303		
Total valid votes		26,588			26,632		
Turnout		26,935	59.1	▲16.1			
AfD gain from SPD	Majority	214	0.8				

=== 2014 election ===
State election (2014): Märkisch-Oderland III
Notes:	Blue background denotes the winner of the electorate vote. Pink background denotes a candidate elected from their party list. Yellow background denotes an electorate win by a list member, or other incumbent. A ✓ or ✗ denotes status of any incumbent, win or lose respectively.						
Party	Candidate	Votes	%	±%	Party votes	%	±%
SPD	Jutta Lieske	6,289	32.8	▲2.8	6,476	33.7	▲2.9
Left	✗ Marco Büchel	4,622	24.1	▼8.2	3,860	20.1	▼10.0
CDU	Dr. Bernd Benser	4,188	21.8	▲1.8	4,197	21.8	▲2.7
AfD	Thomas Kühl	2,255	11.8		2,426	12.6	
BVB/FW	Knut Koall	725	3.8	▲1.1	420	2.2	▲0.5
Greens	Sebastian Lemke	681	3.5	▼1.3	795	4.1	▼0.5
NPD					403	2.1	▼0.7
FDP	Peter Sperr	426	2.2	▼4.3	334	1.7	▼5.6
Pirates					235	1.2	
DKP					49	0.3	▲0.1
REP					46	0.2	Steady
Informal votes		320			265		
Total valid votes		19,186			19,241		
Turnout		19,506	43.0	▼22.7			
SPD gain from Left	Majority	1,667	8.7				

=== 2009 election ===
State election (2009): Märkisch-Oderland III
Notes:	Blue background denotes the winner of the electorate vote. Pink background denotes a candidate elected from their party list. Yellow background denotes an electorate win by a list member, or other incumbent. A ✓ or ✗ denotes status of any incumbent, win or lose respectively.						
Party	Candidate	Votes	%	±%	Party votes	%	±%
Left	Marco Büchel	9,325	32.3	▼2.9	8,774	30.1	▼0.8
SPD	Jutta Lieske	8,637	30.0	▲1.7	8,955	30.8	▲0.2
CDU	Horst Tarnawski	5,754	20.0	▼1.9	5,541	19.0	▲0.8
FDP	Bernhard Sooth	1,884	6.5	▲2.0	2,122	7.3	▲4.1
Greens	Volker Nagel	1,400	4.9	▲1.1	1,362	4.7	▲2.0
NPD	Fredrich Röger	1,052	3.6		801	2.8	
DVU					527	1.8	▼5.6
BVB/FW	Winfred Marschner	782	2.7		489	1.7	
50Plus					173	0.6	▼0.1
RRP					131	0.4	
Die-Volksinitiative					110	0.4	
DKP					69	0.2	▼0.1
REP					67	0.2	
Informal votes		1,059			772		
Total valid votes		28,834			29,121		
Turnout		29,893	65.8	▲13.1			
Left hold	Majority	688	2.3	▼4.6			

=== 2004 election ===
State election (2004): Märkisch-Oderland III
Notes:	Blue background denotes the winner of the electorate vote. Pink background denotes a candidate elected from their party list. Yellow background denotes an electorate win by a list member, or other incumbent. A ✓ or ✗ denotes status of any incumbent, win or lose respectively.						
Party	Candidate	Votes	%	±%	Party votes	%	±%
PDS	Gerlinde Stobrawa	8,128	35.24		7,187	30.93	
SPD	Jutta Lieske	6,533	28.32		7,101	30.56	
CDU	René Krone	5,054	21.91		4,228	18.20	
DVU					1,716	7.38	
FDP	Gordon Willert	1,034	4.48		752	3.24	
Familie					634	2.73	
Greens	Regina Boßdorf	874	3.79		618	2.66	
Gray Panthers					195	0.84	
50Plus					168	0.72	
AfW (Free Voters)	Dieter Lehmann	796	3.45		144	0.62	
Schill	Dietmar Zimmerman	648	2.81		164	0.71	
BRB					95	0.41	
Yes Brandenburg					86	0.37	
AUB-Brandenburg					83	0.36	
DKP					66	0.28	
Informal votes		674			504		
Total valid votes		23,067			23,237		
Turnout		23,741	52.74				
PDS win new seat	Majority	1,595	6.92				

== See also ==
- Politics of Brandenburg
- Landtag of Brandenburg
