= Simona Koß =

German politician

- Koß in 2025

Member of the Bundestag; for Märkisch-Oderland – Barnim II
- In office 26 October 2021 – 25 March 2025
- Preceded by: Hans-Georg von der Marwitz
- Succeeded by: René Springer

Member of the Landtag of Brandenburg
- In office 1 September 2021 – 26 October 2021
- Preceded by: Ortwin Baier
- Succeeded by: Sascha Philipp
- Constituency: Teltow-Fläming III
- In office 8 October 2014 – 25 September 2019
- Preceded by: Bettina Fortunato
- Succeeded by: Franz Wiese
- Constituency: Märkisch-Oderland IV

Personal details
- Born: 9 June 1961 (age 65) Strausberg, East Germany
- Party: Social Democratic
- Children: 2

Simona Koß (born 9 June 1961) is a German politician of the Social Democratic Party (SPD) who has been a member of the German Bundestag, the federal diet since 2021. Previously, she was a member of the State Parliament of Brandenburg from 2014 to 2019 and 2021.

== Early life and education ==
Koß was born 1961 in the East German town of Strausberg and is married and the mother of two children. After attending school in Strausberg, Koß studied first at the Institute for Teacher Education in Neuzelle and then at the Güstrow College of Education until 1984.

Koß then worked as a teacher at various schools. She completed additional studies in special education and worked as the head of a special school in Seelow from 2006 to 2014. Since January 2020, she has been a school councilor at the State Education Authority Frankfurt (Oder).

== Political career ==
=== Career in local politics ===
From 1998 to 2007, Koß was a member of the district council of the Märkisch-Oderland district. From 2014 to 2019 she was a member of the municipal council of Prötzel, and from 2019 she has been mayor of the municipality. Since May 2019, she has again been a member of the district council of Märkisch-Oderland.

=== Career in state politics ===
Koß was a member of the Brandenburg state parliament for the first time in 2014 until 2019, having won the direct mandate in the Märkisch-Oderland IV state parliamentary constituency in the 2014 Brandenburg state election. She initially failed to re-enter the state parliament in the 2019 Brandenburg state election, but succeeded Ortwin Baier in the state parliament on 1 September 2021.

=== Member of the German Parliament (2021–2025) ===
On 26 September 2020, Koß was elected at an SPD members' meeting as a Bundestag candidate for the Bundestag constituency Märkisch-Oderland - Barnim II. She was able to win this constituency directly in the 2021 Bundestag election and thus entered the Bundestag. In the course of this, she resigned her state parliament mandate. Sascha Philipp succeeded her in the state parliament.

In parliament, Koß has since been serving as a full member of the Committee on the Interior and Home Affairs and the Committee on Culture and Media in the Bundestag. She is also a deputy member of the Health Committee. In the 2025 election, Koß lost her seat in the Bundestag.

== Other activities ==
- Federal Agency for Civic Education (BPB), Member of the Board of Trustees (since 2022)
