= Sydower Fließ =

- Municipality
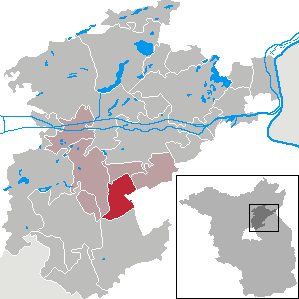
- Location of Sydower Fließ within Barnim district
- Interactive map of Sydower Fließ
- Location within Germany Location within Brandenburg
- Coordinates: 52°45′00″N 13°43′00″E
- Country: Germany
- State: Brandenburg
- District: Barnim
- Municipal assoc.: Biesenthal-Barnim
- Subdivisions: 2 Ortsteile

Government
  - Mayor (2024–29): Stefan Seemke

Area
  - Total: 32.39 km^{2} (12.51 sq mi)
- Elevation: 70–80 m (230–260 ft)

Population (2025-12-31)
  - Total: 1,024
  - Density: 31.61/km^{2} (81.88/sq mi)
- Time zone: UTC+01:00 (CET)
  - Summer (DST): UTC+02:00 (CEST)
- Postal codes: 16230
- Dialling codes: 03337
- Vehicle registration: BAR
- Website: www.amt-biesenthal-barnim.de/gemein6.htm

Sydower Fließ (German pronunciation: [ˈzyːdoːɐ̯ ˈfliːs]) is a municipality in the district of Barnim in Brandenburg in Germany.

== History ==
The municipality of Sydower Fließ was formed on 27 September 1998 by merging the municipalities of Grüntal and Tempelfelde.

From 1815 to 1947, the constituent localities of Sydower Fließ were part of the Prussian Province of Brandenburg, from 1947 to 1952 of the State of Brandenburg, from 1952 to 1990 of the East German Bezirk Frankfurt and since 1990 again of Brandenburg, since 1998 united as Sydower Fließ.

== Demography ==
Development of population since 1875 within the current boundaries (Blue line: Population; Dotted line: Comparison to population development of Brandenburg state; Grey background: Time of Nazi rule; Red background: Time of communist rule)

Sydower Fließ: Population development
within the current boundaries (2020)

Year	Pop.	±% p.a.
1875	1,014	—
1890	1,068	+0.35%
1910	1,013	−0.26%
1925	1,062	+0.32%
1933	1,034	−0.33%
1939	1,040	+0.10%
1946	1,189	+1.93%
1950	1,279	+1.84%
1964	1,109	−1.01%
1971	1,172	+0.79%
1981	984	−1.73%
1985	954	−0.77%
1989	958	+0.10%
1990	961	+0.31%
1991	923	−3.95%

Year	Pop.	±% p.a.
1992	898	−2.71%
1993	888	−1.11%
1994	884	−0.45%
1995	872	−1.36%
1996	873	+0.11%
1997	881	+0.92%
1998	931	+5.68%
1999	921	−1.07%
2000	924	+0.33%
2001	921	−0.32%
2002	931	+1.09%
2003	933	+0.21%
2004	907	−2.79%
2005	905	−0.22%
2006	889	−1.77%

Year	Pop.	±% p.a.
2007	889	+0.00%
2008	901	+1.35%
2009	884	−1.89%
2010	866	−2.04%
2011	846	−2.31%
2012	831	−1.77%
2013	863	+3.85%
2014	886	+2.67%
2015	921	+3.95%
2016	933	+1.30%
2017	967	+3.64%
2018	982	+1.55%
2019	973	−0.92%
2020	977	+0.41%
