= Biesenthal =

- Town
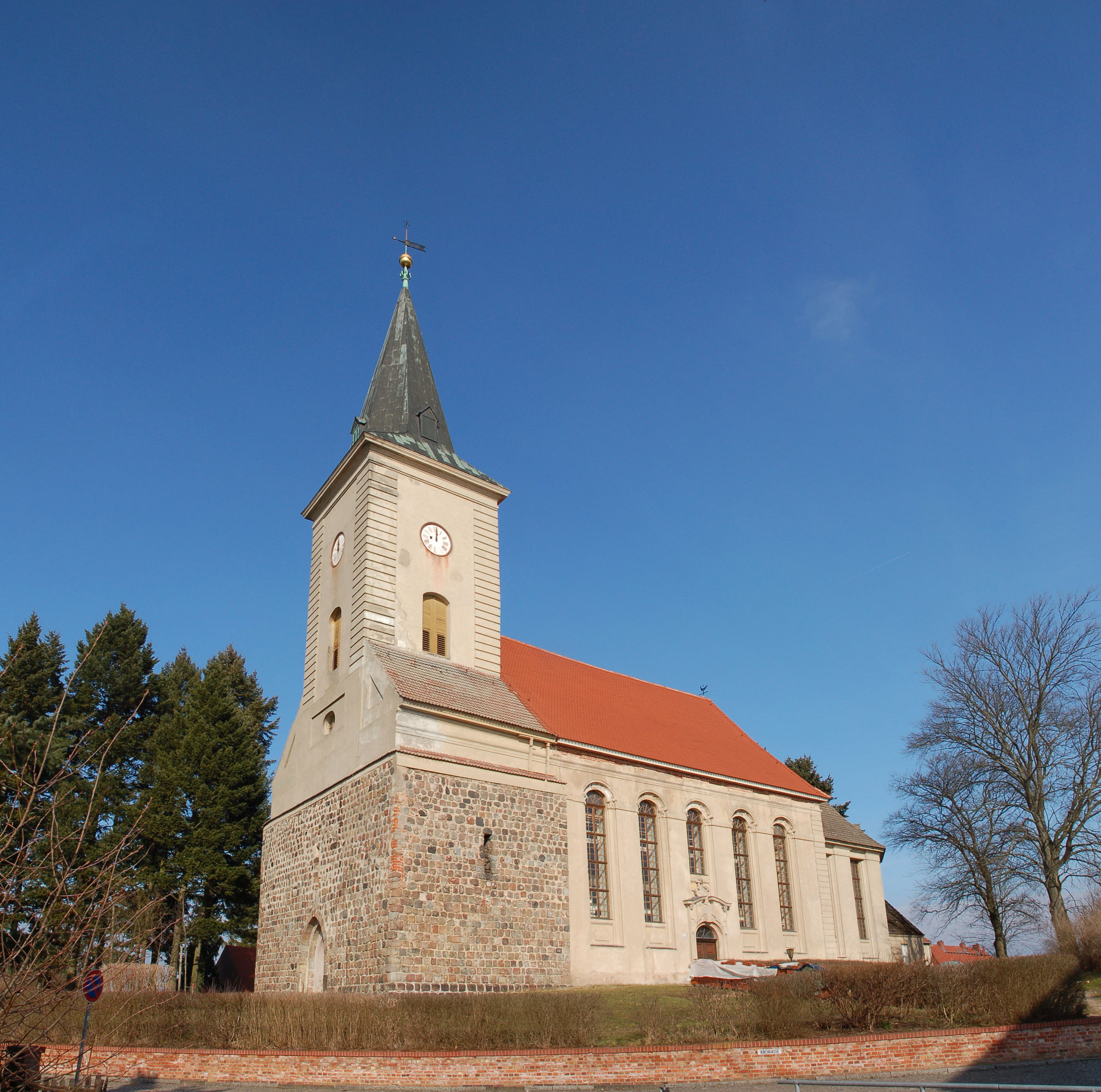
- Parish church

- Coat of arms

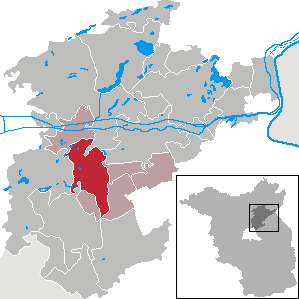
- Location of Biesenthal within Barnim district
- Interactive map of Biesenthal
- Location within Germany Location within Brandenburg
- Coordinates: 52°46′N 13°38′E
- Country: Germany
- State: Brandenburg
- District: Barnim
- Municipal assoc.: Biesenthal-Barnim
- Subdivisions: 2 Ortsteile

Government
  - Mayor (2024–29): Carsten Bruch (CDU)

Area
  - Total: 60.92 km^{2} (23.52 sq mi)
- Elevation: 50 m (160 ft)

Population (2025-12-31)
  - Total: 6,370
  - Density: 105/km^{2} (271/sq mi)
- Time zone: UTC+01:00 (CET)
  - Summer (DST): UTC+02:00 (CEST)
- Postal codes: 16359
- Dialling codes: 03337
- Vehicle registration: BAR
- Website: www.biesenthal.de

Biesenthal (German pronunciation: [ˈbiːzn̩ˌtaːl]) is a town in the district of Barnim in Brandenburg, Germany. It is the administrative seat of the Amt ("collective municipality") Amt Biesenthal-Barnim.

== Geography ==
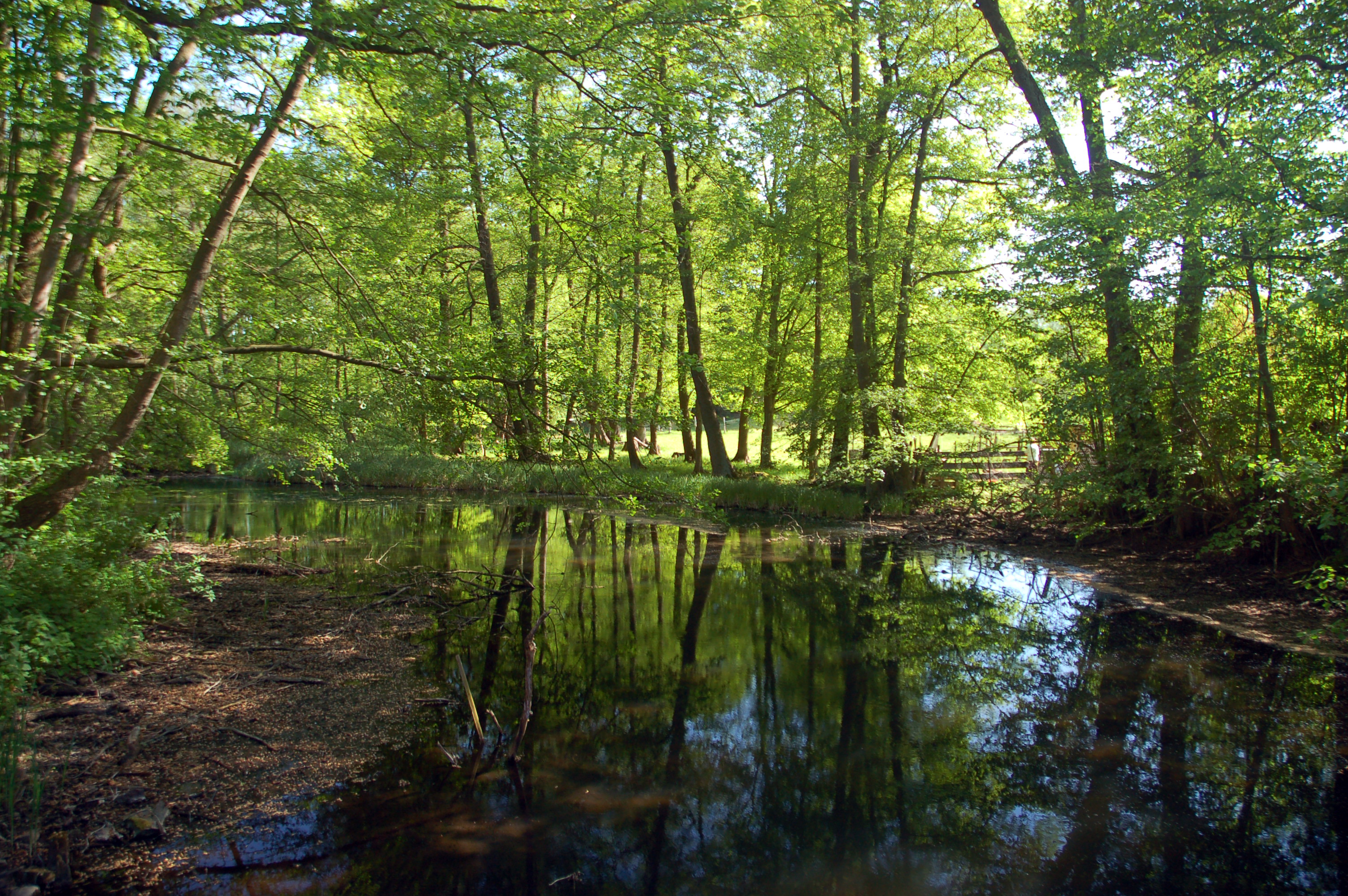
Finow river

The town is located on the Finow river, about 31 km (19 mi) northeast of Berlin (centre). The surrounding Biesenthal Basin is part of the Barnim Plateau and the Barnim Nature Park, characterised by numerous kames and glacial lakes stemming from the Weichselian glaciation.

== History ==
In the early Middle Ages, the region was settled by Polabian Slavs. Conquered by the Ascanian margraves of Brandenburg, Bizdal was first mentioned in a 1258 deed. A local parish was already documented in 1265; the present-day fieldstone church was probably erected at this time. The settlement on the Via Imperii trade route to Berlin was vested with market rights by Margrave John V in 1315.

A castle was mentioned in 1337, when it was first founded, it went under the name of Askanierburg. it was purchased by the Hohenzollern elector John George of Brandenburg in 1577. Its ruins were cleared away after the Thirty Years' War, only ground walls remained. In 1907, a view tower (Kaiser-Friedrich-Turm) was erected on the castle hill.

During the 18th century, the townscape was devastated by several blazes. From 1815 to 1947, Biesenthal was part of the Prussian Province of Brandenburg. The economic development was decisively promoted by the opening of the Berlin–Stettin railway line in 1843. In World War II, a subcamp of the Sachsenhausen concentration camp was located here. The town was occupied by Red Army forces in 1945 and became part of the Soviet occupation zone. From 1947 to 1952, Biesenthal was part of the State of Brandenburg, from 1952 to 1990 of the Bezirk Frankfurt of East Germany and since 1990 again of Brandenburg.

=== Demography ===
Development of population since 1875 within the current boundaries (Blue line: Population; Dotted line: Comparison to population development of Brandenburg state; Grey background: Time of Nazi rule; Red background: Time of communist rule)

Biesenthal: Population development
within the current boundaries (2017)

Year	Pop.	±% p.a.
1875	2,632	—
1890	2,732	+0.25%
1910	3,370	+1.05%
1925	3,556	+0.36%
1933	3,879	+1.09%
1939	4,529	+2.62%
1946	4,598	+0.22%
1950	5,120	+2.72%
1964	4,910	−0.30%
1971	4,801	−0.32%
1981	4,730	−0.15%
1985	4,892	+0.85%
1989	4,815	−0.40%
1990	4,668	−3.05%
1991	4,624	−0.94%

Year	Pop.	±% p.a.
1992	4,695	+1.54%
1993	4,846	+3.22%
1994	4,911	+1.34%
1995	4,869	−0.86%
1996	4,923	+1.11%
1997	5,058	+2.74%
1998	5,183	+2.47%
1999	5,220	+0.71%
2000	5,272	+1.00%
2001	5,340	+1.29%
2002	5,394	+1.01%
2003	5,454	+1.11%
2004	5,509	+1.01%
2005	5,625	+2.11%
2006	5,621	−0.07%

Year	Pop.	±% p.a.
2007	5,637	+0.28%
2008	5,507	−2.31%
2009	5,563	+1.02%
2010	5,543	−0.36%
2011	5,498	−0.81%
2012	5,525	+0.49%
2013	5,564	+0.71%
2014	5,632	+1.22%
2015	5,679	+0.83%
2016	5,671	−0.14%
2017	5,734	+1.11%
2018	5,791	+0.99%
2019	5,869	+1.35%
2020	6,029	+2.73%

== Politics ==
Seats in the town's assembly (*Stadtverordnetenversammlung*) as of the 2024 local elections:

- BVB/FW Biesenthal: 4
- Christian Democratic Union (CDU): 4
- Alternative for Germany (AfD): 3
- The Left: 2
- Biesenthaler Aktionsbündnis / Bündnis für Alternative und Menschlichkeit (BAM): 2
- Alliance '90/The Greens: 1
- Social Democratic Party (SPD): 1
- Pro Danewitz (independent): 1

== Notable people ==
- Jürgen Paeke (born 1948), gymnast
- Max Schmeling (1905-2005), world boxing champion, frequent guest at the training camp in Biesenthal
- Heinz Graffunder (1926-1994), city architect in Berlin; lived in Biesenthal
- Joachim Ziesche (born 1939), ice hockey player, lives in Biesenthal
