= Märkisch-Oderland IV =

State electoral district of Germany

34: Märkisch-Oderland IV
- Electoral district for the Landtag of Brandenburg
- Märkisch-Oderland IV in 2024
- District: Märkisch-Oderland
- Electorate: 38,572 (2024)
- Major settlements: Müncheberg and Seelow

Current electoral district
- Created: 1994
- Party: AfD
- Member: Falk Gerd Janke

Märkisch-Oderland IV is an electoral constituency (German: Wahlkreis) represented in the Landtag of Brandenburg. It elects one member via first-past-the-post voting. Under the constituency numbering system, it is designated as constituency 34. It is located within the district of Märkisch-Oderland.

== Geography ==
The constituency includes the towns of Müncheberg and Seelow, the municipality of Letschin, and the districts of Golzow, Lebus, Märkische Schweiz, and Seelow-Land.

There were 38,572 eligible voters in 2024.

== Members ==
Election	Member	Party	%
2004	Wolfgang Heinze	PDS	36.4
2009	Bettina Fortunato	Left	33.0
2014	Simona Koß	SPD	27.5
2019	Franz Wiese	AfD	25.8
2024	Falk Janke	AfD	38.8

== Election results ==
=== 2024 election ===
State election (2024): Märkisch-Oderland IV
Notes:	Blue background denotes the winner of the electorate vote. Pink background denotes a candidate elected from their party list. Yellow background denotes an electorate win by a list member, or other incumbent. A ✓ or ✗ denotes status of any incumbent, win or lose respectively.						
Party	Candidate	Votes	%	±%	Party votes	%	±%
AfD	✓ Falk Gerd Janke	11,041	38.8	▲13.0	10,006	35.0	▲8.3
SPD	Sina Schönbrunn	7,533	26.5	▲1.1	7,607	26.6	▲1.0
BSW					4,599	16.1	
CDU	Kristy Augustin	4,317	15.2	▼0.6	2,723	9.5	▼5.7
BVB/FW	Schütze	2,420	8.5	▲2.1	848	3.0	▼2.4
Left	Schönwald	2,178	7.7	▼7.4	916	3.2	▼9.7
Greens	Sommer	578	2.0	▼6.8	733	2.6	▼5.5
APT					591	2.1	▼0.2
Plus					156	0.5	▼0.4
FDP	Wendlandt	366	1.3	▼1.4	154	0.5	▼2.4
DLW					138	0.5	
Values					78	0.3	
Third Way					33	0.1	
DKP					23	0.1	
Informal votes		433			261		
Total valid votes		28,433			28,605		
Turnout		28,866	74.8	▲13.5			
AfD hold	Majority	3,508	12.3	▲11.9			

=== 2019 election ===
State election (2019): Märkisch-Oderland IV
Notes:	Blue background denotes the winner of the electorate vote. Pink background denotes a candidate elected from their party list. Yellow background denotes an electorate win by a list member, or other incumbent. A ✓ or ✗ denotes status of any incumbent, win or lose respectively.						
Party	Candidate	Votes	%	±%	Party votes	%	±%
AfD	Franz Josef Wiese	6,050	25.8	▲11.5	6,253	26.7	▲12.0
SPD	✗ Simona Koß	5,943	25.4	▼2.1	6,010	25.6	▼6.4
CDU	Kirsty Augustin	3,688	15.8	▼7.6	3,561	15.2	▼6.0
Left	Bettina Fortunato	3,532	15.1	▼10.5	3,025	12.9	▼6.7
Greens	Jan Sommer	2,056	8.8	▲4.1	1,891	8.1	▲3.3
BVB/FW	Bernd Schlieter	1,505	6.4	▲3.1	1,253	5.3	▲3.3
FDP	Berthold Stein	632	2.7	▲1.5	681	2.9	▲1.6
Tierschutzpartei					522	2.2	
Pirates					120	0.5	▼0.5
ÖDP					98	0.4	
V-Partei3					46	0.2	
Informal votes		370			316		
Total valid votes		23,406			23,460		
Turnout		23,776	61.3	▲12.8			
AfD gain from SPD	Majority	107	0.4				

=== 2014 election ===
State election (2014): Märkisch-Oderland IV
Notes:	Blue background denotes the winner of the electorate vote. Pink background denotes a candidate elected from their party list. Yellow background denotes an electorate win by a list member, or other incumbent. A ✓ or ✗ denotes status of any incumbent, win or lose respectively.						
Party	Candidate	Votes	%	±%	Party votes	%	±%
SPD	Simona Koß	5,122	27.5	▼4.9	5,967	32.0	▲1.3
Left	✗ Bettina Fortunato	4,764	25.6	▼7.4	3,650	19.6	▼12.0
CDU	Kristy Augustin	4,360	23.4	▲5.2	3,951	21.2	▲2.8
AfD	Meinhard Gutowski	2,661	14.3		2,746	14.7	
Greens	Symon Nicklas	870	4.7	▲0.1	894	4.8	▲0.1
NPD					553	3.0	▼0.1
BVB/FW	Günter Hohensee	610	3.3	▲0.8	372	2.0	▲0.3
FDP	Fritz Krause-Uhl	221	1.2	▼4.4	234	1.3	▼4.7
Pirates					190	1.0	
DKP					55	0.3	▲0.1
REP					52	0.3	▲0.1
Informal votes		381			325		
Total valid votes		18,608			18,664		
Turnout		18,989	48.5	▼17.6			
SPD gain from Left	Majority	358	1.9				

=== 2009 election ===
State election (2009): Märkisch-Oderland IV
Notes:	Blue background denotes the winner of the electorate vote. Pink background denotes a candidate elected from their party list. Yellow background denotes an electorate win by a list member, or other incumbent. A ✓ or ✗ denotes status of any incumbent, win or lose respectively.						
Party	Candidate	Votes	%	±%	Party votes	%	±%
Left	Bettina Fortunato	8,624	33.0	▼3.4	8,304	31.6	▼0.5
SPD	Udo Schulz	8,455	32.4	▲8.7	8,080	30.7	▲3.4
CDU	Olaf Kaupat	4,748	18.2	▼8.3	4,847	18.4	▼1.0
FDP	Hans-Viktor Hoffmann	1,467	5.6	▲2.1	1,566	6.0	▲3.3
Greens	Nastasja Ilgenstein	1,208	4.6	▲1.5	1,227	4.7	▲2.2
NPD	Manfred Wenzel	972	3.7		806	3.1	
DVU					517	2.0	▼5.8
BVB/FW	Steffen Sonntag	656	2.5		443	1.7	
Die-Volksinitiative					155	0.6	
50Plus					150	0.6	▼0.1
RRP					119	0.5	
DKP					52	0.2	▲0.1
REP					52	0.2	
Informal votes		970			782		
Total valid votes		26,130			26,318		
Turnout		27,100	66.1	▲7.1			
Left hold	Majority	169	0.6	▼12.1			

=== 2004 election ===
State election (2004): Märkisch-Oderland IV
Notes:	Blue background denotes the winner of the electorate vote. Pink background denotes a candidate elected from their party list. Yellow background denotes an electorate win by a list member, or other incumbent. A ✓ or ✗ denotes status of any incumbent, win or lose respectively.						
Party	Candidate	Votes	%	±%	Party votes	%	±%
PDS	Wolfgang Heinze	8,680	36.40		7,730	32.15	
CDU	Hans-Georg von der Marwitz	6,317	26.49		4,661	19.38	
SPD	Gunter Fritsch	5,641	23.66		6,553	27.25	
DVU					1,878	7.81	
AfW (Free Voters)	Benjamin Gramsch	931	3.90		251	1.04	
Familie					823	3.42	
FDP	Klaus-Dieter Lehmann	843	3.54		655	2.72	
Greens	Andreas Berger	744	3.12		604	2.51	
Schill	Falk Janke	688	2.89		223	0.93	
50Plus					177	0.74	
Gray Panthers					162	0.67	
BRB					108	0.45	
AUB-Brandenburg					104	0.43	
Yes Brandenburg					80	0.33	
DKP					36	0.15	
Informal votes		884			683		
Total valid votes		23,844			24,045		
Turnout		24,728	58.96				
PDS win new seat	Majority	2,563	9.91				

== See also ==
- Politics of Brandenburg
- Landtag of Brandenburg
