= Kurt Kretschmann =

German nature conservationist (1914–2007)

- Kretschmann was the originator of the "Owl" silhouette used to identify conservation zones in Germany
- Born: 2 March 1914; Berlin, Germany
- Died: 20 January 2007 (aged 92); Bad Freienwalde, Brandenburg, Germany
- Occupation: Conservationist
- Political party: SED
- Spouse: Erna Jahnke/Scherff (1912–2001)
- Children: 1 son (1942–1945)

Kurt Kretschmann (2 March 1914 – 20 January 2007) was a German nature conservationist.

Most of his professional career took place in the German Democratic Republic where he is known as "Nestor des Naturschutzes in Ostdeutschland" (loosely "East Germany's original Nature Conservationist"). He also designed the long-eared owl silhouette, originally on a yellow background, which since 1989 has been adapted and become known across Germany as a symbol identifying conservation areas.

== Life ==
=== Early years ===
Kretschmann attended a local school in Berlin and undertook an apprenticeship in tailoring before getting a job as a cutter with a Berlin tayloring firm. However, Germany underwent significant regime change in January 1933 when the NDSDAP (Nazi Party) took power, and lost little time in imposing the country's first twentieth century one-party dictatorship. One side-effect of the new government's policy was a switch away from men's suits to production of uniforms by Kretschmann's employer. In April 1933 Kurt Kretschmann gave notice that he was a committed pacifist and went to live with a friend in a garden summer house in Rüdnitz near Bernau, just outside Berlin on its north-east side. He now became a vegetarian and embarked on a period of intense physical training which included a 10 km long-distance run each day. He also experimented with his diet and took the opportunity to expand his knowledge of world literature, the classics and philosophical scholars, while playing the violin recreationally. In 1935 he faced conscription for military service, but through intense fasting was able to defer his call-up for a year. In 1936 he was conscripted into the military, but was then released after just five months because the committed pacifist was deemed "a danger to the morale of the troops". He now undertook a lengthy walking tour, reportedly of 12,000 km, across Germany, Switzerland and Northern Italy. Impressions accumulated during this time affected him deeply.

=== Second World War ===
In August 1939 a non-aggression pact between Nazi Germany and the Soviet Union opened the way for a rerun of the Partitions of Poland between the two dictatorships, and this in turn triggered a return to "world war" involving most of Europe which broke out the next month. In 1940 Kretschmann was conscripted for forced labour in Königsberg (Neumarkt) in Brandenburg. He refused to work in a munitions factory and was forced to work on the recently constructed Königsberg military airfield. In 1942 he married Erna Scherff. One source describes this as a "Long-distance wedding" ("Ferntrauung"), but their son was nevertheless born the same year: he died three years later. Between 1941 and 1945 Kurt Kretschmann fought in the German army on the Russian Front. He participated in and survived the Siege of Stalingrad. In the increasingly chaotic closing phase of the war another hearing condemned Kretschmann to death. The sentence was not carried out, possibly because of a Red army attack in which he was wounded. He was then able to return to Germany for home leave, during which time he deserted from the army. Supported by his wife who was able to supply water, vegetables and candles, he hid for 75 winter days in a two-meter wide hole in the ground under a garden summer house, on the site where in 1960 he and his wife would build their home, and which is today designated the "House for the care of Nature" ("Haus der Naturpflege"), at Bad Freienwalde in eastern Brandenburg. He was then captured by the Soviets: between the end of the war in May 1945 and August of that year he was held by the Soviets as a prisoner of war.

Published output
not a complete list
- Landschaftsschutzgebiet Gamengrund-Seenrinne. VEB Bibliographisches Institut, 1957
- Werbellinsee. VEB Bibliographisches Institut, 1960
- mit Kurt Steinbring: Der Scharmützelsee und Bad Saarow-Pieskow. VEB Brockhaus, 1964
- Lüge und Wahrheit – Kriegserlebnisse eines deutschen Soldaten. VWF, 1993, ISBN 3-89700-400-3
- Und da leben sie noch? Berlin, Friedensbibliothek/Antikriegsmuseum, 1999
- with Helene Walter: Entstehung der Lehrstätte für Naturschutz „Müritzhof“. Verlag Lenover, Neustrelitz 1995, ISBN 3-930164-11-6
- with Rudolf Behm: Mulch total. OLV Organischer Landbau Verlag, 2001, ISBN 3-922201-18-0
- with David Stile und Jeanie Stiles: Lauben und Hütten. Ökobuch, 2002, ISBN 3-922964-84-2

Before German reunification Nature Conservation zones in West Germany were identified with the silhouette of a Sea eagle, though people sometimes mistook it for an American bald eagle.

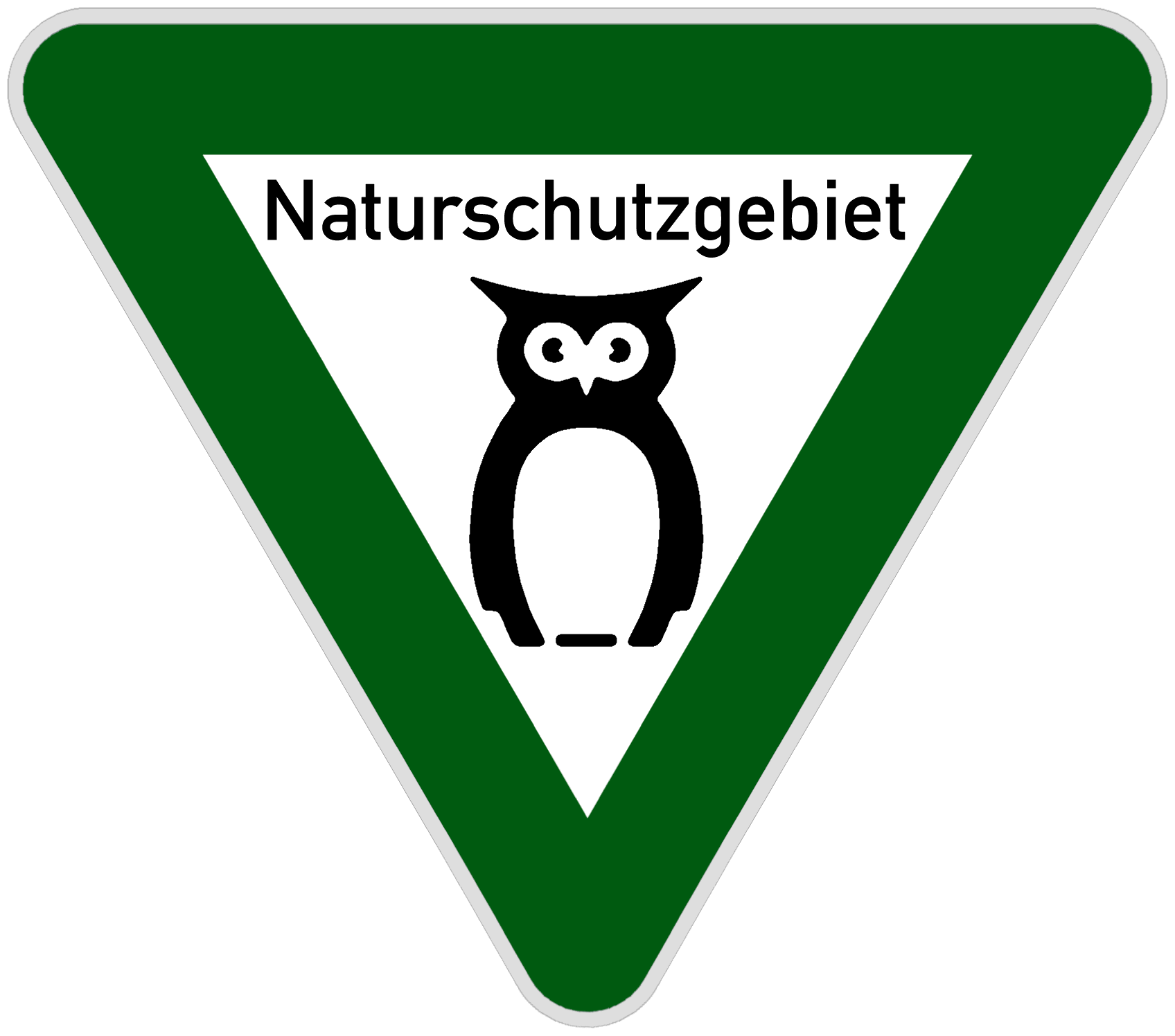
After German reunification Nature Conservation zones in what had been West Germany were identified (as in what had previously been East Germany) with a modified version of the Long-eared owl silhouette, designed and first used for the purpose by Kurt Kretschmann back in 1950. This was highlighted by some commentators as a (regrettably rare) case where eastern custom won out over western custom in the newly reunified Germany.

=== Political affiliation ===
Early in 1946 Kretschmann joined the Communist Party. His part of what had been Germany was now designated the Soviet occupation zone. In April 1946, across the entire zone, the contentious merger of the KPD and more moderately left-wing SPD prepared the ground for a return to one-party rule. Kretschmann was one of many former communists who lost little time in signing their membership across to the resulting Socialist Unity Party (SED / Sozialistische Einheitspartei Deutschlands), although the focus of his future career would lie outside mainstream politics. In October 1949 the Soviet occupation zone was superseded by the Soviet sponsored German Democratic Republic. Forty years later, in November 1989, protestors beached the Berlin Wall and it became apparent that the Soviet army had no instructions to apply force to crushing the rising tide of anti-government discontent in East Germany. A succession of political developments took place culminating with German reunification, formally in October 1990. Through this time and beyond it Kretschmann's political loyalty stood firm. When the old East German SED (party) sought to reinvent itself for a multi-party future as the Party of Democratic Socialism (PDS) Kretschmann stayed with it. He died just four days after the PDS in turn had dissolved itself to be replaced by a "new" party, "The Left" ("Die Linke").

=== Nature conservation ===
His period in the Rüdnitz garden summer house in the 1930s and subsequent extended walking tour had awakened in Kretschmann an interest in nature conservation. Starting in 1946, he was active as a hiking guide around Oberbarnim for more than 40 years. In 1949 he was given responsibility for nature conservation in the Oberbarnim administrative district, and in 1951 he became State Commissioner for Nature Conservation across the entire state of Brandenburg. By now he had designed and was applying in Brandenburg the Long-eared owl symbol later used to identify conservation zones across Germany. Between 1952 and 1954 he was employed as Conservation Secretary at the Berlin-based National Academy of Agricultural Sciences. Between 1954 and 1960 he worked as the founder-chief of the "Müritzhof" Conservation Lyceum. He also set up the "Working Group for the Protection of Endangered Species". Later, in 1976, he established the "White stork Working Group", active across Europe. In Rathsdorf he rescued a threatened 200 year old Kiln, the "Altgaul Stork Tower"", on the top of which a pair of storks had nested for longer than anyone could remember, and in 1978 opened a "Stork Museum" (permanent exhibition).

=== "House for Nature Conservation" ("Haus der Naturpflege") ===
After his release in August 1945, in the garden where earlier in the year he had hidden from the fatal bullet that would have ended his life following his desertion from the army, Kurt Kretschmann started work on replacing the old garden summer house with a "Log/Block House", taking inspiration from the many similar structures he had seen during his time as a soldier in Russia. Underneath the house Kretschmann designed an integrated secret cellar, not accessible from within the house but only by lifting the floor boards of the terrace outside. From 1960, while Erna became the principle bread-winner, authoring and producing publications on behalf of the two of them, Kurt himself focused on opening the garden as the "House for the care of Nature" ("Haus der Naturpflege"), open to all who shared his interests in nature conservation, productive use of gardens and/or a vegetarian lifestyle, a subject on which he became ever more evangelical. During the years between 1945 and 1989, with few fresh vegetables available in the East German cities, the opportunity to grow vegetables afforded by even small domestic gardens was often much prized by city-dwellers with access to country cottages or relatives outside the cities. Public interest in vegetable growing was correspondingly more mainstream than it would become following reunification. Kretschmann masterminded and ran the "Haus der Naturpflege" for many years, although in 1982 or 1984, by which time he and his wife were both in their late 70s, the property was handed over to the local municipality. It continues to operate as a visitor attraction, latterly with its own simple "hay-barn hotel" ("Heuhotel").

=== The pacifist vegetarian ===
Kurt Kretschmann's record as a strident free thinking pacifist-vegetarian and army deserter was not something that would have instantly endeared him to the authorities during the four decades when he lived in a country frequently identified by German journalists and historians as Germany's second one-party dictatorship. After the East German regime collapsed in 1989/90 he himself became more vociferous on some of the issues involved and on his own experiences both of war and of vegetarianism. Subsequently, these aspects of Kretschmann's personality have become more widely known.

He also wrote poetry.

== Recognition ==
In 1991 Kretschmann became honorary president for life of the Nature and Biodiversity Conservation Union (Naturschutzbund Deutschland). Two years later Kurt and Erna Kretschmann together received the European Business Award for the Environment. On 2 March 1999 the couple were made Honorary citizens of Bad Freienwalde, which is where he lived, participating fully in the local community until his death on 20 January 2007, aged 92.

After his death the senior school in Bad Freienwalde was renamed as the "Erna and Kurt Kretschmann School" ("Erna-und-Kurt-Kretschmann-Schule").
