= Dagmar Enkelmann =

German politician (born 1956)

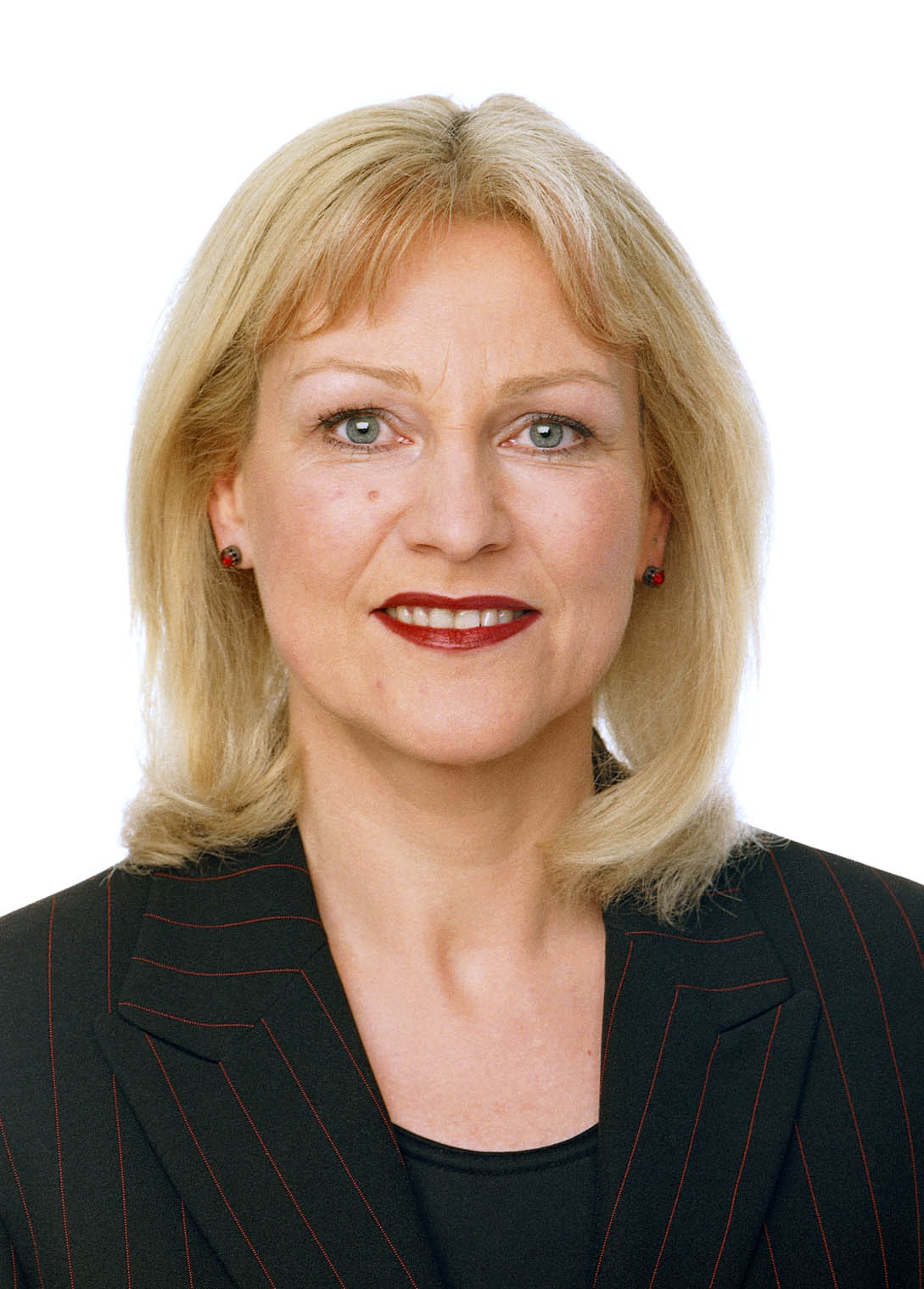
- Enkelmann in 2005

Member of the Bundestag; from Brandenburg
- In office 18 October 2005 – 22 October 2013
- Preceded by: Multi-member district
- Succeeded by: Hans-Georg von der Marwitz
- Constituency: State list (2005–2009); Märkisch-Oderland – Barnim II (2009–2013)
- In office 3 October 1990 – 26 October 1998
- Preceded by: Constituency established
- Succeeded by: Multi-member district
- Constituency: Volkskammer (1990)

Member of the Landtag of Brandenburg
- In office 29 September 1999 – 20 October 2005
- Preceded by: Ingrid Friese
- Succeeded by: Andreas Bernig
- Constituency: Barnim I (1999–2004); Barnim II (2004–2005)

Member of the Volkskammer; for Frankfurt (Oder)
- In office 5 April 1990 – 2 October 1990
- Preceded by: Constituency established
- Succeeded by: Constituency abolished

Personal details
- Born: Dagmar Gertraud Elsa Ebert; 5 April 1956 (age 70) Altlandsberg, East Germany
- Party: Die Linke
- Other political affiliations: SED (1977–1989); PDS (1989–2007)
- Spouse: Bernd Jaiser (m. 2005)
- Children: 3
- Education: Karl Marx University

Dagmar Enkelmann (née Ebert; 5 April 1956) is a German politician of Die Linke ("The Left") party.

In 2005 she became Parliamentary Party Manager ("Chief Whip") for Die Linke in the Bundestag (national parliament), a position from which she resigned in 2013 after losing her seat. In December 2012 she took on the chair of the Rosa Luxemburg Foundation, a position to which she was elected in succession to Heinz Vietze.

== Early life and education ==
Dagmar Gertraud Elsa Ebert was born in Altlandsberg, a small historic town a short distance to the east of Berlin and at that time in the Bezirk Frankfurt of East Germany. She attended school in nearby Strausberg, passing her school leaving exams (Abitur) in 1974, which opened the way to a university level education. Between 1974 and 1979 she was a student of the History faculty at Karl Marx University (as it was known at that time) in Leipzig. She emerged with an extensive knowledge of Marxist sociology and a degree in 1979. After that she taught history between 1979 and 1985 at the "Wilhelm Pieck FDJ Youth Academy" at Bogensee, near Bernau and just outside Berlin.

From 1985 till 1989 she was a post-graduate student ("Aspirantin") at the ruling party central committee's Academy for Social Sciences. It was here that she submitted her doctoral dissertation, entitled "Analysis and critique of concepts of the bourgeois ideologues in West Germany: Identity Crises of East German youth" ("Analyse und Kritik des Konzepts bürgerlicher Ideologen der BRD: Identitätskrise der Jugend der DDR"). The modalities of what happened next were affected by the political changes that followed the breach of the Berlin Wall by protestors in 1989, but Dagmar Ebert nevertheless received what amounted to a doctorate, though probably not the form of doctorate she would have been anticipating when she embarked on her researches for the work four years earlier.

== Political career ==
=== Party career ===
Enkelmann joined the Socialist Unity Party ("Sozialistische Einheitspartei Deutschlands"/ SED) in 1977. The SED was the ruling party in what many people thought of as a one-party dictatorship. She engaged in trades union and women work. After reunification the party rebranded itself as the Party of Democratic Socialism (PDS) and scrambled to reinvent itself for a democratic future. Enkelmann stayed with the party. She served between 2003 and 2006 as deputy leader of the PDS.

In regional elections in Brandenburg in 2004 she put herself forward as an alternative to the regional minister president Matthias Platzeck of the centre-left Social Democratic Party. The PDS' share of the vote increased to 28%, ranking a strong second to the Social Democratics. It was the best result the PDS had achieved in Brandenburg since reunification and the restoration in 1990 of Brandenburg as a state with its own regional legislature. However, it was not enough to overturn the governing coalition.

As a result of the 2007 merger between the PDS and the (much smaller, but briefly influential) WASG movement, Enkelmann became a member of the party now branded simply as Die Linke ("The Left").

=== National parliament and regional parliament ===
At a time when her youngest child was still a young baby, Enkelmann came to national politics through active participation in the Round table movement. Between March and October 1990 she was a member of East Germany's first - and as matters turned out last - freely elected national parliament ("Volkskammer"). She became co-leader (with Bernd Meier) of the PDS group in the chamber, and one of two PDS party members elected by party colleagues to the chambers' Präsidium. Reunification took place formally in October 1990, at which point the East German Volkskammer and the West German Bundestag were effectively merged. In order to respect demographic fairness, only 143 members of the 400 seat East German chamber retained seats in the combined assembly. Enkelmann was one of these, however. She was re-elected to the Bundestag, representing the Brandenburg electoral district, later in 1990, and again in 1994, leaving the Bundestag in 1998, still aged only 42. She told an interviewer that "eight years in such an exposed position" had been enough, although she never expressly ruled out a return to national politics.

In July 2008 Enkelmann captured the headlines, triggering a "media moment" when a television interviewer asked her, "Are you satisfied with how democracy works in Germany today?"

She answered:

" ... also I do not think this democracy resolves people's problems."
" ... auch ich finde, diese Demokratie löst die Probleme der Menschen nicht."

Later she expanded a little on that answer in a letter:

"It would certainly have been better if the East German people had had more time to fashion the transfer to a market economy for themselves ... As a member of the last East German parliament I was one of those working on a transfer process for many laws - for instance on a new set of labour laws, a new criminal code ... and many more besides. [But] unfortunately most of that was nullified because the decision of the majority made East Germany's entry [to the reunificed Germany] a virtually overnight [transition]."
"This [headline grabbing comment] came in the context of a discussion on the clear democratic deficit, which featured in that programme as transmitted which also covered things like popular decision making and plebiscites. .... Whether today's bourgois democracy really can become the ultimate vision for a democratic socialist reality is a question that certainly will not be answered except in the future."

"Es wäre sicher besser gewesen, wenn die Bevölkerung der DDR mehr Zeit gehabt hätte, den Übergang in die Marktwirtschaft aus eigener Kraft zu gestalten. .... Als Mitglied der letzten DDR-Volkskammer habe ich selbst an vielen Gesetzen mitgearbeitet, die Übergangsregelungen z.B. für ein neues Arbeitsgesetzbuch, ein Strafgesetzbuch ... und vieles andere mehr beinhalteten. Leider hat die Entscheidung der Mehrheit für einen Beitritt der DDR vieles davon quasi über Nacht zunichte gemacht."
"Das hat seine Ursachen eben auch in den deutlichen Demokratiedefiziten, auf die ich in der Sendung hingewiesen habe, und denen unter anderem mit Volksentscheiden und Volksbegehren auch auf Bundesebene beizukommen wäre. ... Ob die bürgerliche Demokratie tatsächlich das Nonplusultra ist oder die Vision eines demokratischen Sozialismus Realität werden könnte, ist eine Frage, die wohl erst in der Zukunft beantwortet wird."

Between September 1999 and October 2005 she was a member of the Brandenburg regional parliament ("Landtag"), serving till 2004 as a member of the regional party executive, spokesperson on environment and energy policy and a member of the committee for agriculture, environmental protection and planning. During 2004–2005 Enkelmann was the leader of the PDS group in the Brandenburger Landtag.

At the 2005 general election Enkelmann returned to the National Parliament ("Bundestag"). She served as Parliamentary Party Manager ("Chief Whip") for Die Linke between 2005 and 2013. In order to avoid the distortions arising in wholly constituency based systems, the German electoral system allocates some seats on a list basis, shared between the parties according to their overall vote shares. In 2005 Enkelmann was elected because her name was sufficiently high up on the regional PDS party list. In the Bundestag she became a member of the chamber's Council of Elders, also serving on the committee for election verification, parliamentary immunity and procedure. In the 2009 general election she stood successfully as a "direct candidate" for the Barnim II electoral district. However, in the 2013 general election, when she stood for re-election in the same constituency, she lost out to the CDU candidate, Hans-Georg von der Marwitz. Unlike von der Marwitz, Enkelmann had rejected the idea of simultaneously having her name placed on her party list as insurance against not securing direct election in the Barnim constituency, and accordingly in 2013 she left the Bundestag for a second time.

On 26 February 2010, Enkelmann was one of a large number of PDS Bundestag members to be expelled from the chamber during a debate on prolonging German military involvement in Afghanistan. This arose from members standing up in the chamber and holding up to the cameras placards which showed names of victims of the Kunduz air attack. The proposal of Bundestag president Norbert Lammert that the excluded members should be permitted to participate in the vote at the end of the debate was nevertheless followed.

It became known in January 2012 that Enkelmann was one of 27 Bundestag members from Die Linke placed under surveillance by the security authorities. The surveillance drew criticism and condemnation from across the political spectrum.

=== Other appointments ===
Since 1998 Enkelmann has been a local council member for the municipality of Bernau bei Berlin, and in this capacity a member of the local development agency.

She has also, since November 2008, been an alternate for Jan Korte in the third board of parliamentary trustees of the "Bundesstiftung Aufarbeitung", a federal agency mandated with helping Germany come to terms with the East German dictatorship.

== Personal life ==
Enkelmann married her longstanding life-partner, meteorologist Bernd Jaiser, in 2005. It was her third marriage. She has three recorded children, born in 1976, 1981 and 1989. Since 2013 she has had four grandchildren.
