= Melchow =

- Municipality
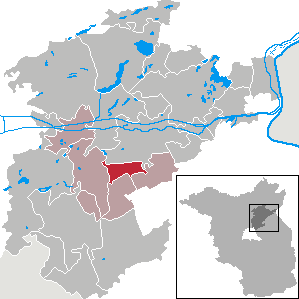
- Location of Melchow within Barnim district
- Interactive map of Melchow
- Location within Germany Location within Brandenburg
- Coordinates: 52°46′59″N 13°43′00″E
- Country: Germany
- State: Brandenburg
- District: Barnim
- Municipal assoc.: Biesenthal-Barnim
- Subdivisions: 2 Ortsteile

Government
  - Mayor (2024–29): Ronald Kühn

Area
  - Total: 16.62 km^{2} (6.42 sq mi)
- Elevation: 60 m (200 ft)

Population (2025-12-31)
  - Total: 1,131
  - Density: 68.05/km^{2} (176.3/sq mi)
- Time zone: UTC+01:00 (CET)
  - Summer (DST): UTC+02:00 (CEST)
- Postal codes: 16230
- Dialling codes: 03337
- Vehicle registration: BAR
- Website: www.amt-biesenthal-barnim.de

Melchow (German pronunciation: [ˈmɛlçoː]) is a municipality in the district of Barnim in Brandenburg in Germany.

== History ==
From 1815 to 1947, Melchow was part of the Prussian Province of Brandenburg, from 1947 to 1952 of the State of Brandenburg, from 1952 to 1990 of the East German Bezirk Frankfurt and since 1990 again of Brandenburg.

== Demography ==
Development of population since 1875 within the current boundaries (Blue line: Population; Dotted line: Comparison to population development of Brandenburg state; Grey background: Time of Nazi rule; Red background: Time of communist rule)

Melchow: Population development
within the current boundaries (2020)

Year	Pop.	±% p.a.
1875	903	—
1890	805	−0.76%
1910	792	−0.08%
1925	1,046	+1.87%
1933	1,118	+0.84%
1939	1,291	+2.43%
1946	1,254	−0.41%
1950	1,370	+2.24%
1964	1,317	−0.28%
1971	1,236	−0.90%
1981	1,094	−1.21%
1985	1,076	−0.41%
1989	953	−2.99%
1990	936	−1.78%
1991	919	−1.82%

Year	Pop.	±% p.a.
1992	914	−0.54%
1993	894	−2.19%
1994	906	+1.34%
1995	922	+1.77%
1996	978	+6.07%
1997	1,011	+3.37%
1998	1,027	+1.58%
1999	1,044	+1.66%
2000	1,080	+3.45%
2001	1,063	−1.57%
2002	1,069	+0.56%
2003	1,069	+0.00%
2004	1,073	+0.37%
2005	1,057	−1.49%
2006	898	−15.04%

Year	Pop.	±% p.a.
2007	901	+0.33%
2008	907	+0.67%
2009	896	−1.21%
2010	899	+0.33%
2011	925	+2.89%
2012	923	−0.22%
2013	937	+1.52%
2014	939	+0.21%
2015	932	−0.75%
2016	932	+0.00%
2017	950	+1.93%
2018	975	+2.63%
2019	982	+0.72%
2020	994	+1.22%
