= Breydin =

- Municipality
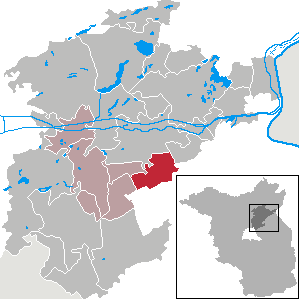
- Location of Breydin within Barnim district
- Interactive map of Breydin
- Location within Germany Location within Brandenburg
- Coordinates: 52°45′00″N 13°46′59″E
- Country: Germany
- State: Brandenburg
- District: Barnim
- Municipal assoc.: Biesenthal-Barnim
- Subdivisions: 2 Ortsteile

Government
  - Mayor (2024–29): Thomas Höhns

Area
  - Total: 35.27 km^{2} (13.62 sq mi)
- Elevation: 64 m (210 ft)

Population (2025-12-31)
  - Total: 812
  - Density: 23.0/km^{2} (59.6/sq mi)
- Time zone: UTC+01:00 (CET)
  - Summer (DST): UTC+02:00 (CEST)
- Postal codes: 16230
- Dialling codes: 033451
- Vehicle registration: BAR

Breydin (German pronunciation: [bʁaɪˈdiːn]) is a municipality in the Barnim district of Brandenburg in Germany.

== History ==
From 1815 to 1947, Breydin was part of the Prussian Province of Brandenburg, from 1947 to 1952 of the State of Brandenburg, from 1952 to 1990 of the East German Bezirk Frankfurt and since 1990 again of Brandenburg.

== Demography ==
Development of population since 1875 within the current boundaries (Blue line: Population; Dotted line: Comparison to population development of Brandenburg state; Grey background: Time of Nazi rule; Red background: Time of communist rule)

Breydin: Population development
within the current boundaries (2017)

Year	Pop.	±% p.a.
1875	1,430	—
1890	1,228	−1.01%
1910	1,127	−0.43%
1925	1,076	−0.31%
1933	1,069	−0.08%
1939	1,076	+0.11%
1946	1,283	+2.55%
1950	1,351	+1.30%
1964	1,007	−2.08%
1971	985	−0.32%
1981	797	−2.10%
1985	722	−2.44%
1989	762	+1.36%
1990	742	−2.62%
1991	752	+1.35%

Year	Pop.	±% p.a.
1992	752	+0.00%
1993	761	+1.20%
1994	780	+2.50%
1995	793	+1.67%
1996	796	+0.38%
1997	809	+1.63%
1998	827	+2.22%
1999	817	−1.21%
2000	817	+0.00%
2001	851	+4.16%
2002	861	+1.18%
2003	861	+0.00%
2004	878	+1.97%
2005	860	−2.05%
2006	852	−0.93%

Year	Pop.	±% p.a.
2007	861	+1.06%
2008	840	−2.44%
2009	830	−1.19%
2010	820	−1.20%
2011	815	−0.61%
2012	808	−0.86%
2013	807	−0.12%
2014	799	−0.99%
2015	781	−2.25%
2016	764	−2.18%
2017	757	−0.92%
2018	760	+0.40%
2019	774	+1.84%
2020	801	+3.49%
