= Rüdnitz =

- Municipality
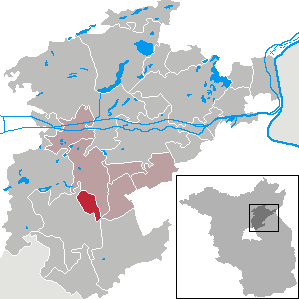
- Location of Rüdnitz within Barnim district
- Interactive map of Rüdnitz
- Location within Germany Location within Brandenburg
- Coordinates: 52°43′00″N 13°37′00″E
- Country: Germany
- State: Brandenburg
- District: Barnim
- Municipal assoc.: Biesenthal-Barnim

Government
  - Mayor (2024–29): Andreas Hoffmann

Area
  - Total: 13.92 km^{2} (5.37 sq mi)
- Elevation: 61 m (200 ft)

Population (2025-12-31)
  - Total: 2,154
  - Density: 154.7/km^{2} (400.8/sq mi)
- Time zone: UTC+01:00 (CET)
  - Summer (DST): UTC+02:00 (CEST)
- Postal codes: 16321
- Dialling codes: 03338
- Vehicle registration: BAR

Rüdnitz (German pronunciation: [ˈʁyːdnɪts]) is a municipality in the district of Barnim in the state of Brandenburg, Germany.

== History ==
From 1815 to 1947, Rüdnitz was part of the Prussian Province of Brandenburg, from 1947 to 1952 of the State of Brandenburg, from 1952 to 1990 of the East German Bezirk Frankfurt and since 1990 again of Brandenburg.

== Demography ==
Development of population since 1875 within the current boundaries (Blue line: Population; Dotted line: Comparison to population development of Brandenburg state; Grey background: Time of Nazi rule; Red background: Time of communist rule)

Rüdnitz: Population development
within the current boundaries (2020)

Year	Pop.	±% p.a.
1875	408	—
1890	400	−0.13%
1910	769	+3.32%
1925	708	−0.55%
1933	755	+0.81%
1939	888	+2.74%
1946	1,088	+2.94%
1950	1,188	+2.22%
1964	1,167	−0.13%
1971	1,327	+1.85%
1981	1,225	−0.80%
1985	1,123	−2.15%
1989	1,084	−0.88%
1990	1,057	−2.49%
1991	1,055	−0.19%

Year	Pop.	±% p.a.
1992	1,040	−1.42%
1993	1,069	+2.79%
1994	1,171	+9.54%
1995	1,337	+14.18%
1996	1,509	+12.86%
1997	1,637	+8.48%
1998	1,768	+8.00%
1999	1,777	+0.51%
2000	1,811	+1.91%
2001	1,906	+5.25%
2002	1,976	+3.67%
2003	1,923	−2.68%
2004	1,882	−2.13%
2005	1,822	−3.19%
2006	1,790	−1.76%

Year	Pop.	±% p.a.
2007	1,767	−1.28%
2008	1,800	+1.87%
2009	1,839	+2.17%
2010	1,899	+3.26%
2011	1,927	+1.47%
2012	1,945	+0.93%
2013	1,955	+0.51%
2014	1,967	+0.61%
2015	1,980	+0.66%
2016	1,925	−2.78%
2017	1,983	+3.01%
2018	1,972	−0.55%
2019	1,989	+0.86%
2020	2,032	+2.16%

== Personalities ==
- Friedrich von Bodelschwingh (1831-1910), pastor, founded the first dwelling Hoffnungstal Foundation Lobetal in Rüdnitz in 1905
- Kurt Kretschmann (1914-2007), conservationist, lived in time in Rüdnitz
