= René Springer =

German politician (born 1979)

René Springer MdB
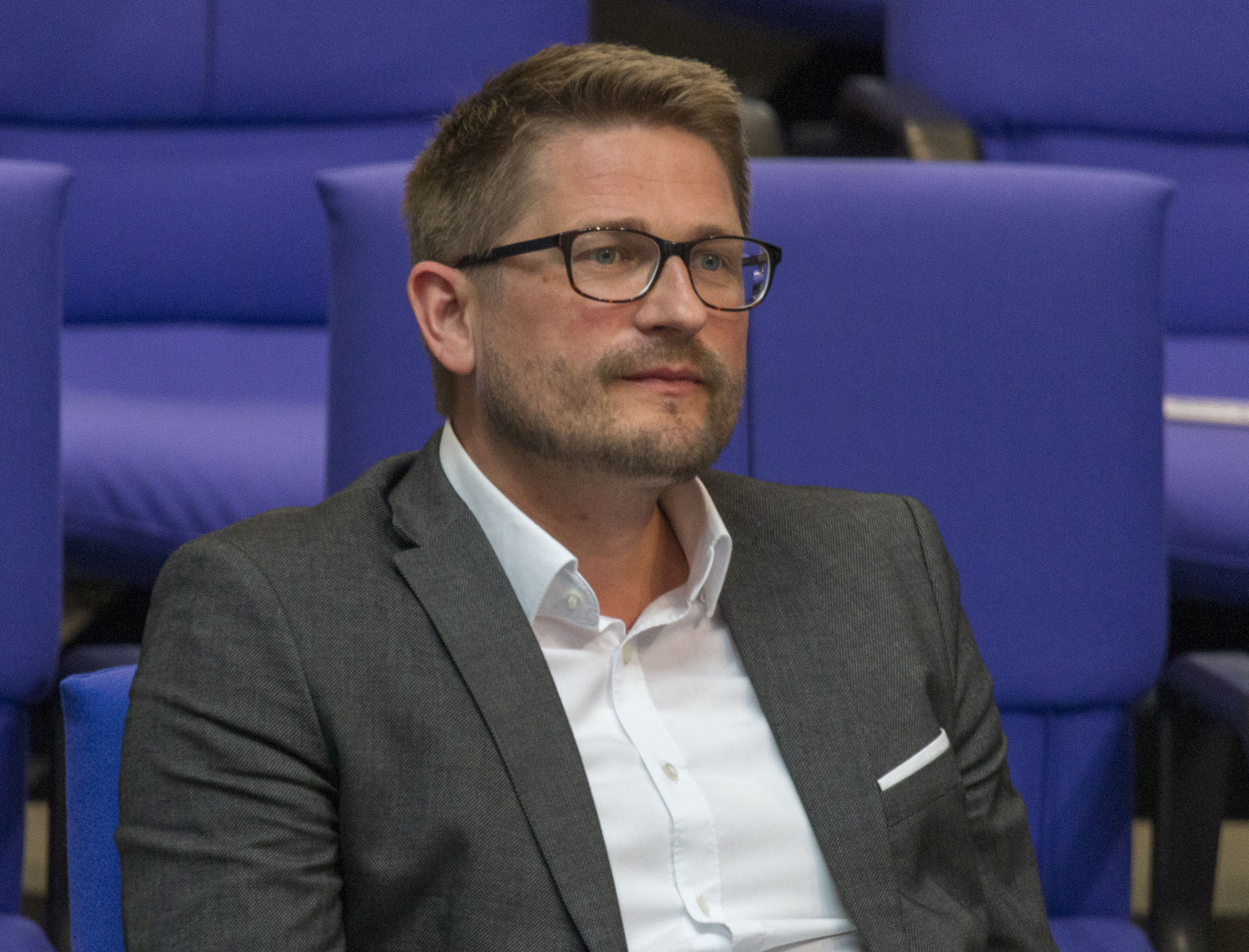
- Springer in 2020

Member of the Bundestag; from Brandenburg
- Incumbent
- Assumed office 24 October 2017
- Constituency: State list (2017–2025); Märkisch-Oderland – Barnim II (2025–present)

Personal details
- Born: 15 July 1979 (age 47) East Berlin, East Germany
- Party: Alternative for Germany
- Other political affiliations: SPD (2004–2009)
- Children: 2
- Education: University of Greifswald
- Website: rene-springer.info

Military service
- Allegiance: Germany
- Branch/service: Bundeswehr; German Navy
- Years of service: 1997–2009

René Springer (born 15 July 1979) is a German politician of the Alternative for Germany (AfD). Springer has served as a member of the Bundestag from the state of Brandenburg since 2017, and the leader of the AfD state section in Brandenburg since 2024.

== Early life ==
Springer was born on 15 July 1979 in East Berlin, East Germany. He completed his Realschulabschluss in 1996. Between 1997 and 2009 he served in the German Navy, during which he mastered an apprenticeship as an electrician as well as completing his Abitur and serving in Afghanistan for six months. Springer then went on to study political science and worked for the German Society for International Cooperation (GIZ), supporting electrification in Mozambique.

== Political career ==
By the end of 2014, Springer became the personal advisor of Alexander Gauland, starting his political career.

He became a member of the Bundestag after the 2017 German federal election and was reelected during the 2025 German federal election, now serving for the constituency Märkisch-Oderland – Barnim II. He is a member of the Committee for Labour and Social Affairs and a deputy member of the Budget Committee. In 2024, he became the leader of the Brandenburg state section of the AfD.

== Views ==
In 2019, Springer commented on the War in Afghanistan that German troops "have no business being in Afghanistan". Springer supports a sovereign German foreign policy and a peaceful coexistence with other nations on the international stage, also advocating for a 'Europe of Fatherlands' (Europa der Vaterländer) while opposing the current European Union.

In January 2024, Springer spoke in favor of Remigration, by writing on X, "We will return foreigners to their homeland. Millions of times. This is not a secret plan. It’s a promise. For more security. For more justice. To preserve our identity. For Germany." in reference to the 2023 Potsdam far-right meeting.

== Personal life ==
Springer is married and has two children. He is not a member of either of the state-recognized churches. He lives in Eberswalde.
