= Marienwerder, Brandenburg =

Marienwerder
- Municipality
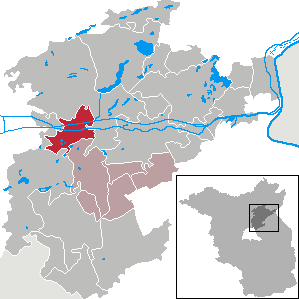
- Location of Marienwerder within Barnim district
- Interactive map of Marienwerder
- Location within Germany Location within Brandenburg
- Coordinates: 52°50′33″N 13°36′00″E
- Country: Germany
- State: Brandenburg
- District: Barnim
- Municipal assoc.: Biesenthal-Barnim
- Subdivisions: 3 Ortsteile

Government
  - Mayor (2024–29): Annett Klingsporn

Area
  - Total: 40.32 km^{2} (15.57 sq mi)
- Elevation: 35 m (115 ft)

Population (2025-12-31)
  - Total: 1,620
  - Density: 40.2/km^{2} (104/sq mi)
- Time zone: UTC+01:00 (CET)
  - Summer (DST): UTC+02:00 (CEST)
- Postal codes: 16348
- Dialling codes: 03335
- Vehicle registration: BAR
- Website: marienwerder-barnim.de

Marienwerder (German pronunciation: [maˌʁiːənˈvɛʁdɐ]) is a municipality in the district of Barnim in the state of Brandenburg, Germany.

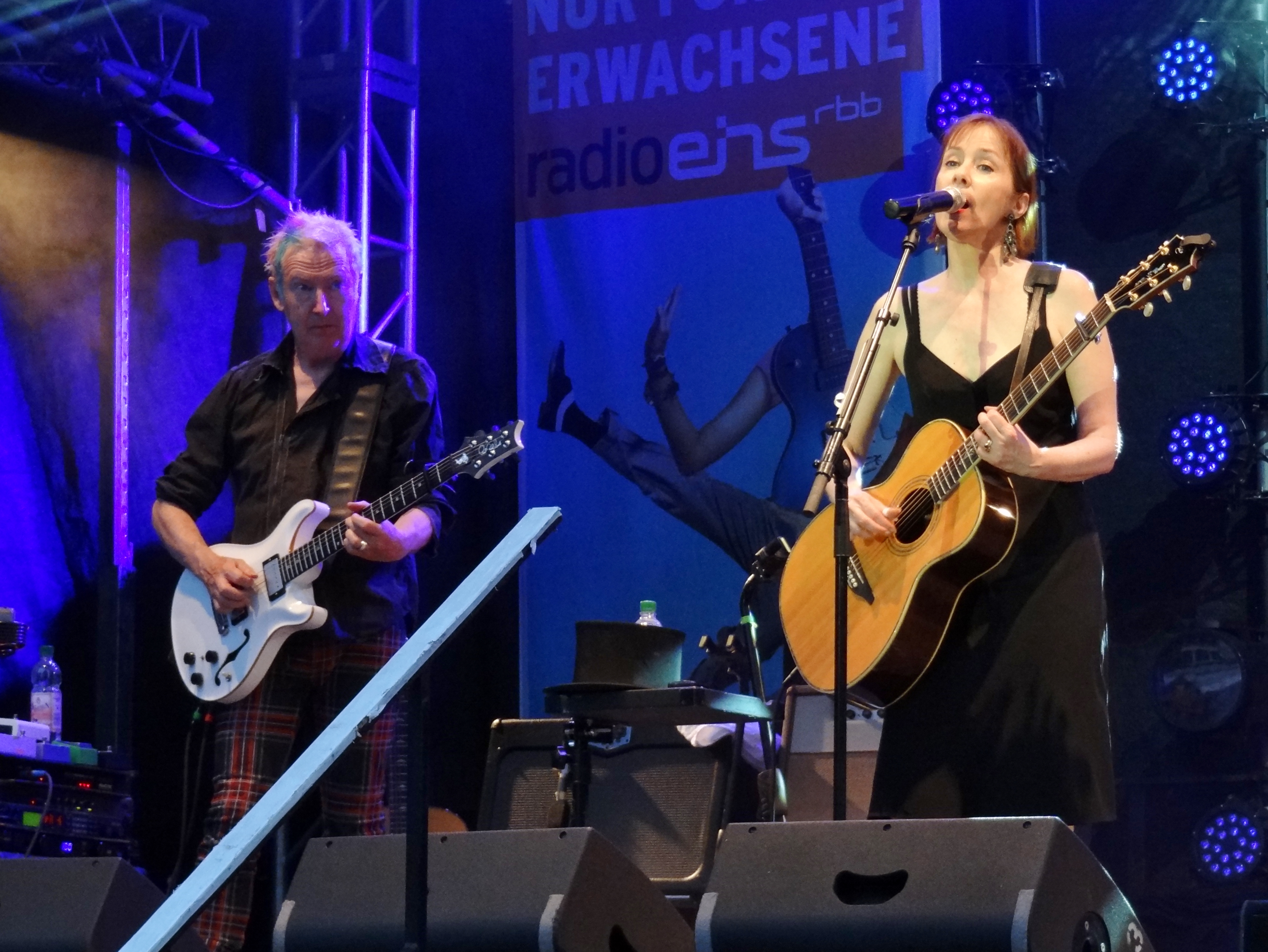
Suzanne Vega on stage here 2016

Every summer since 2004, a two-day music festival called Inselleuchten takes place in Marienwerder in mid-July. From 2007 on the popular actor and musician Axel Prahl hosted it as presenter and figurehead. In 2016 Suzanne Vega gave a stage show here. Due to the COVID-19 pandemic the 2020 festival was canceled and rescheduled to 2021.

== History ==
From 1815 to 1947, Marienwerder was part of the Prussian Province of Brandenburg, from 1947 to 1952 of the State of Brandenburg, from 1952 to 1990 of the East German Bezirk Frankfurt and since 1990 again of Brandenburg.

== Demography ==
Development of population since 1875 within the current boundaries (Blue line: Population; Dotted line: Comparison to population development of Brandenburg state; Grey background: Time of Nazi rule; Red background: Time of communist rule)

Marienwerder: Population development
within the current boundaries (2020)

Year	Pop.	±% p.a.
1875	2,294	—
1890	2,324	+0.09%
1910	2,019	−0.70%
1925	2,313	+0.91%
1933	2,507	+1.01%
1939	2,526	+0.13%
1946	2,505	−0.12%
1950	2,541	+0.36%
1964	1,988	−1.74%
1971	1,890	−0.72%
1981	1,559	−1.91%
1985	1,506	−0.86%
1989	1,403	−1.76%
1990	1,387	−1.14%
1991	1,376	−0.79%

Year	Pop.	±% p.a.
1992	1,386	+0.73%
1993	1,412	+1.88%
1994	1,440	+1.98%
1995	1,421	−1.32%
1996	1,444	+1.62%
1997	1,475	+2.15%
1998	1,605	+8.81%
1999	1,652	+2.93%
2000	1,659	+0.42%
2001	1,656	−0.18%
2002	1,705	+2.96%
2003	1,717	+0.70%
2004	1,751	+1.98%
2005	1,763	+0.69%
2006	1,768	+0.28%

Year	Pop.	±% p.a.
2007	1,771	+0.17%
2008	1,757	−0.79%
2009	1,731	−1.48%
2010	1,765	+1.96%
2011	1,768	+0.17%
2012	1,758	−0.57%
2013	1,762	+0.23%
2014	1,739	−1.31%
2015	1,745	+0.35%
2016	1,698	−2.69%
2017	1,695	−0.18%
2018	1,725	+1.77%
2019	1,686	−2.26%
2020	1,691	+0.30%
