= Hans-Georg von der Marwitz (politician) =

German politician

- Von der Marwitz in 2013

Member of the Bundestag; from Brandenburg
- In office 27 October 2009 – 26 October 2021
- Preceded by: Multi-member district
- Succeeded by: Simona Koß
- Constituency: State list (2009–2013); Märkisch-Oderland – Barnim II (2013–2021)

Personal details
- Born: 8 April 1961 (age 65) Heidelberg, West Germany
- Party: Christian Democratic Union
- Children: 4
- Relatives: Von der Marwitz family

Hans-Georg von der Marwitz (born 8 April 1961) is a German politician of the Christian Democratic Union (CDU) who served as a member of the Bundestag from the state of Brandenburg from 2009 until 2021.

== Political career ==
Von der Marwitz became a member of the Bundestag after the 2009 German federal election. He was a member of the Committee for Food and Agriculture.

In 2019, German media reported that von der Marwitz was the parliamentarian who reported one of the highest income from activities unrelated to his mandate that year with €1,223,500.

In June 2021, Marwitz announced that he will not be standing in the 2021 German federal election.
