= Bad Freienwalde =

- Town
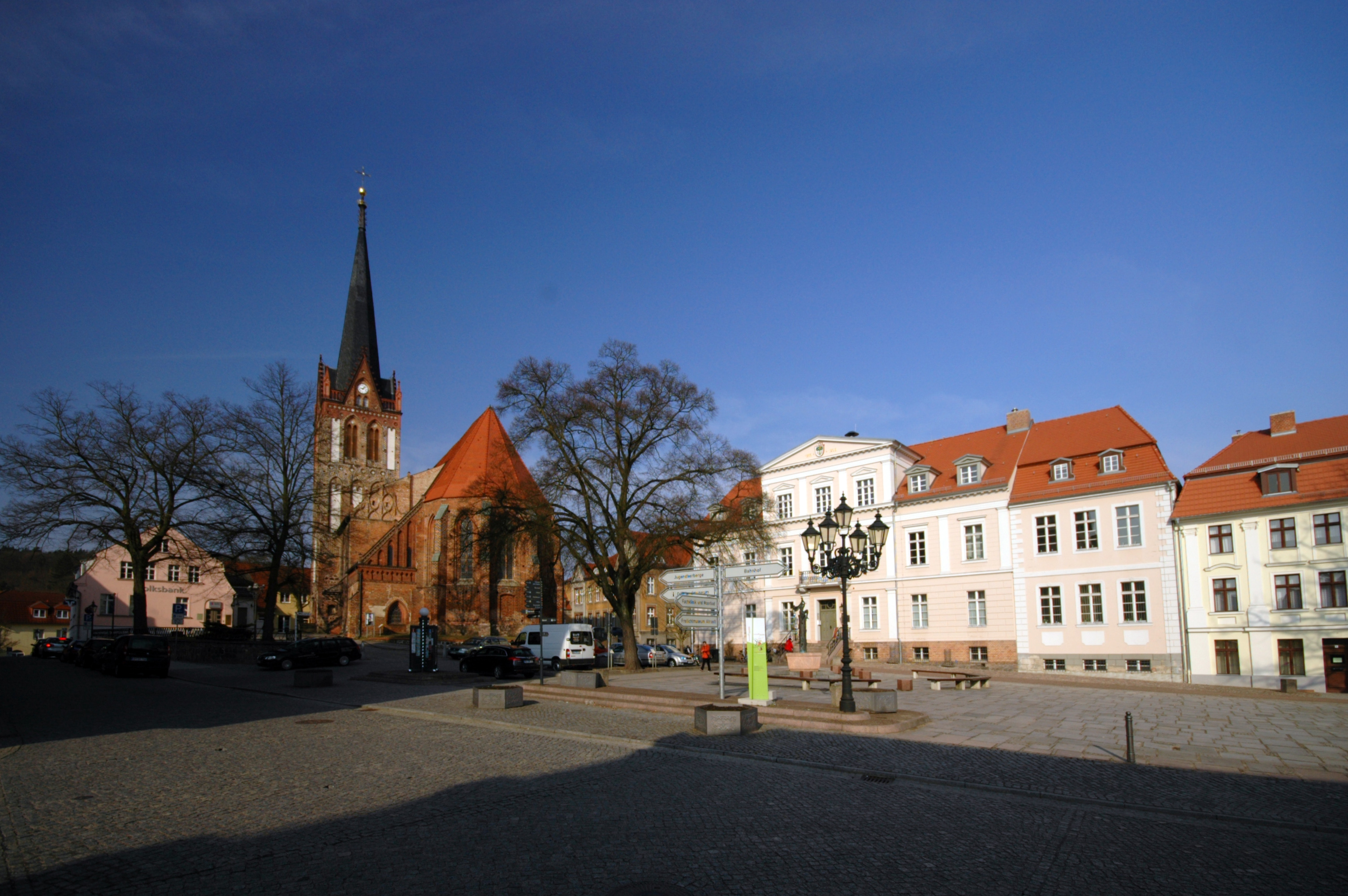
- St Nicolas Church and town hall

- Coat of arms

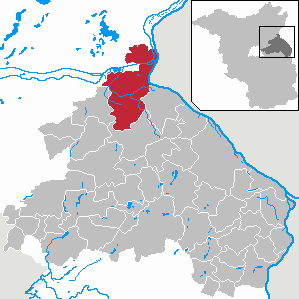
- Location of Bad Freienwalde within Märkisch-Oderland district
- Interactive map of Bad Freienwalde
- Location within Germany Location within Brandenburg
- Coordinates: 52°47′08″N 14°01′57″E
- Country: Germany
- State: Brandenburg
- District: Märkisch-Oderland
- Subdivisions: 7 Ortsteile

Government
  - Mayor (2017–25): Ralf Lehmann (CDU)

Area
  - Total: 131.11 km^{2} (50.62 sq mi)
- Elevation: 10–158 m (33–518 ft)

Population (2025-12-31)
  - Total: 11,750
  - Density: 89.62/km^{2} (232.1/sq mi)
- Time zone: UTC+01:00 (CET)
  - Summer (DST): UTC+02:00 (CEST)
- Postal codes: 16259
- Dialling codes: 03344
- Vehicle registration: MOL, FRW, SEE, SRB
- Website: bad-freienwalde.de

Bad Freienwalde (German pronunciation: [baːt ˌfʁaɪənˈvaldə]) is a spa town in the Märkisch-Oderland district in Brandenburg, in north-eastern Germany.

== Geography ==
The town is situated on the Alte Oder, an old branch of the Oder River at the northwestern rim of the Oderbruch basin and the steep rise of the Barnim Plateau. It is located 15 km (9.3 mi) east of Eberswalde, and 50 km (31 mi) northeast of Berlin, near the border with Poland. The municipal area comprises the following villages: Altranft, Altglietzen, Bralitz, Hohensaaten, Hohenwutzen, Neuenhagen and Schiffmühle.

== History ==
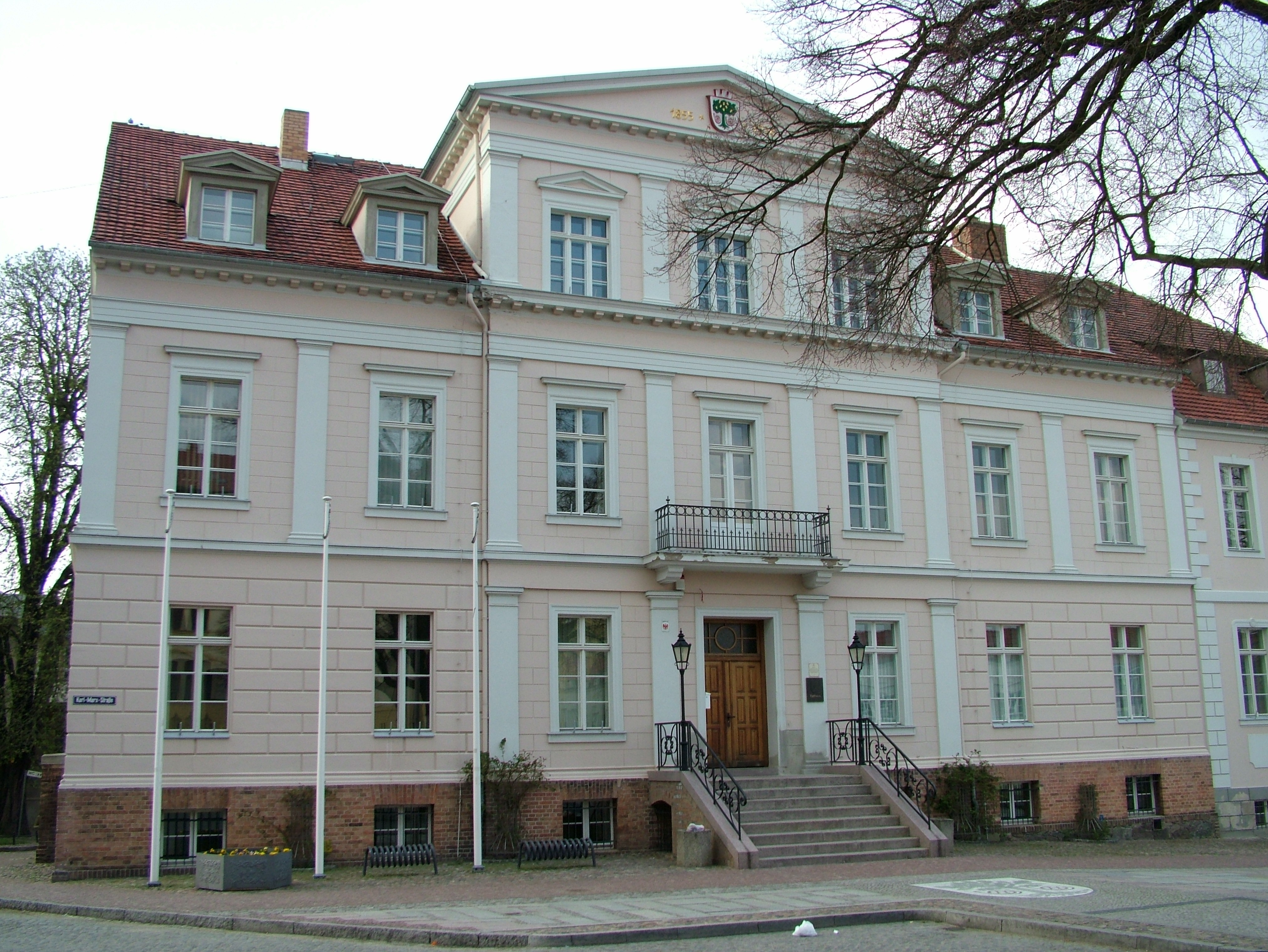
Town hall

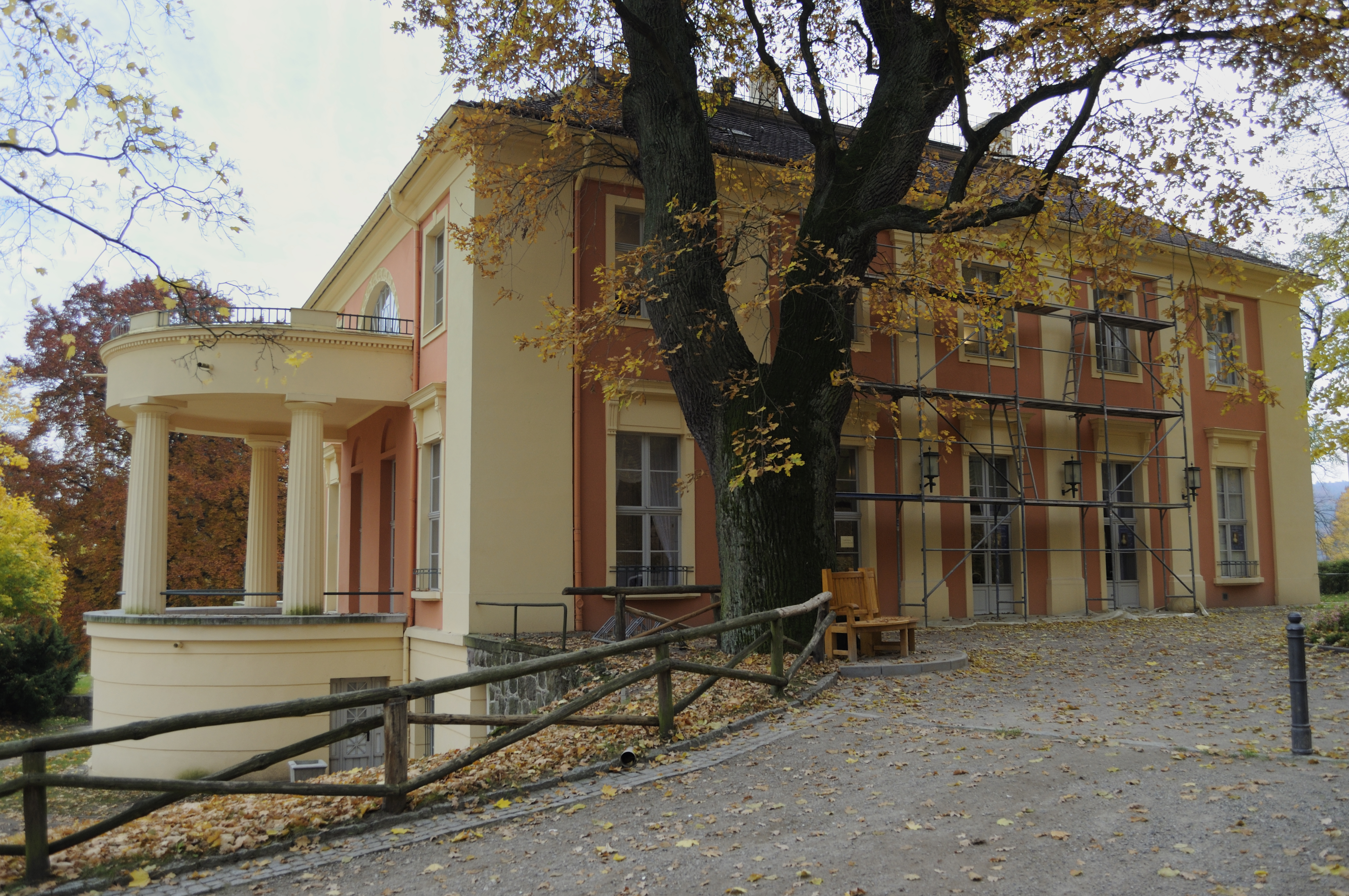
Freienwalde Castle

The settlement of Vrienwalde in the Margraviate of Brandenburg was first mentioned in a 1316 deed and appeared as a town in 1364. From 1618, the Freienwalde manor was directly held by the Brandenburg prince-electors (Kurfürsten).

From 1701, Bad Freienwalde was part of the Kingdom of Prussia, and from 1871 also the German Empire. From 1815 to 1947, it was administratively part of the Province of Brandenburg.

A mineral spring was discovered in 1683. The alchemist Johann Kunckel brought it to the attention of the "Great Elector" Frederick William of Brandenburg, who, gout-ridden, arrived in Freienwalde the next year. Recorded by the physician Bernhardus Albinus in 1685, the Kurfürstenquelle became the foundation of Freienwalde's rise as a spa town. Frederick William's son King Frederick I of Prussia had a first maison de plaisance erected by the architect Andreas Schlüter.

The development was further promoted, when in 1799 the small Neoclassical Freienwalde Castle was built according to plans by David Gilly as a summer residence of Princess Frederika Louisa of Hesse-Darmstadt, the widow of King Frederick William II of Prussia. Its park was redesigned by Peter Joseph Lenné in 1822. The industrialist and politician Walther Rathenau acquired the palace in 1909, it was nationalised after his assassination in 1922. Freienwalde achieved the official status of spa town (Bad) in 1925.

During the final stages of World War II, on 11 March 1945, it was visited by Adolf Hitler in his last visit on the war front. On 16–20 April 1945, fights between the 1st Polish Army and 9th German Army took place in the area, won by the Poles.

From 1947 to 1952 of the State of Brandenburg, from 1952 to 1990 of the Bezirk Frankfurt of East Germany and since 1990 again of Brandenburg.

== Notable people ==
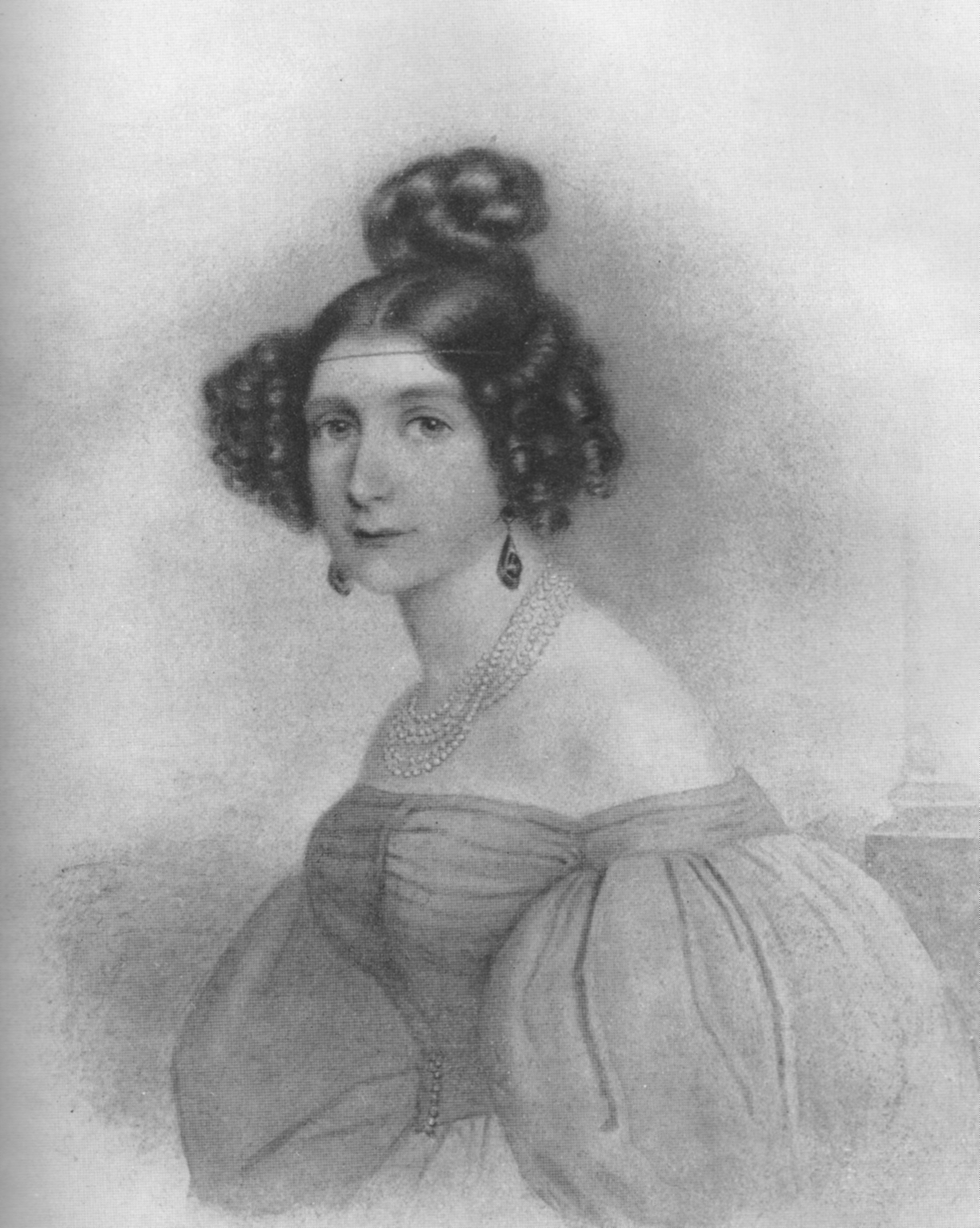
Elisa Radziwill

- Elisabeth Radziwill, (1803−1834), beloved of Prince Wilhelm I of Prussia died at Freienwalde
- Edith Andreae (1883–1952) salonière and sister of Walther Rathenau.
- Alfred Blaschko (1858–1922), dermatologist
- Hilde Jennings (1906-unknown), actress
- Hans Keilson (1909–2011), Dutch psychotherapist, novelist
- Kurt Kretschmann (1914-2007) nature conservationist
- Erwin Wickert (1915-2008), German diplomat
- Ferdinand Friedrich Zimmermann (1898-1967), journalist, publicist and Sturmbannführer
- Volkmar Sigusch (born 1940), sexologist and physician
- Hildegard und Siegfried Schumacher, children's book authors

== Demography ==
Development of population since 1875 within the current boundaries (Blue Line: Population; Dotted Line: Comparison to population development of Brandenburg state; Grey Background: Time of Nazi rule; Red Background: Time of Communist rule)

Recent Population Development and Projections: Population Development before Census 2011 (blue line); Recent Population Development according to the Census in Germany in 2011 (blue bordered line); Official projections for 2005-2030 (yellow line); for 2017-2030 (scarlet line); for 2020-2030 (green line)

Bad Freienwalde (Oder): Population development
within the current boundaries (2020)

Year	Pop.	±% p.a.
1875	15,003	—
1890	17,076	+0.87%
1910	19,016	+0.54%
1925	18,825	−0.07%
1939	19,850	+0.38%
1950	20,867	+0.46%
1964	19,077	−0.64%

Year	Pop.	±% p.a.
1971	18,769	−0.23%
1981	17,455	−0.72%
1985	17,023	−0.62%
1990	16,659	−0.43%
1995	15,624	−1.27%
2000	14,808	−1.07%
2005	13,739	−1.49%

Year	Pop.	±% p.a.
2010	12,788	−1.42%
2015	12,406	−0.60%
2016	12,316	−0.73%
2017	12,327	+0.09%
2018	12,365	+0.31%
2019	12,304	−0.49%
2020	12,286	−0.15%

== International relations ==
Bad Freienwalde is twinned with:

- Bad Pyrmont, Germany
- Międzyrzecz, Poland
