= Lars Günther =

German politician (born 1976)

Member of the Landtag of Brandenburg
- Incumbent
- Assumed office 25 September 2019
- Preceded by: Jutta Lieske
- Constituency: Märkisch-Oderland III

Personal details
- Born: 1976 (age 49–50)
- Party: Alternative for Germany

Lars Günther (born 1976) is a German politician serving as a member of the Landtag of Brandenburg since 2019. He has served as chairman of the Alternative for Germany in Märkisch-Oderland since 2019.
