= Biesenthal-Barnim =

- Amt
- Map of Barnim highlighting Biesenthal-Barnim
- Interactive map of Biesenthal-Barnim
- Location within Germany Location within Brandenburg
- Coordinates: 52°46′N 13°44′E
- Country: Germany
- State: Brandenburg
- District: Barnim
- Seat: Biesenthal
- Subdivisions: 6 municipalities

Area
  - Total: 199.43 km^{2} (77.00 sq mi)

Population (2025-12-31)
  - Total: 13,111
  - Density: 65.742/km^{2} (170.27/sq mi)
- Time zone: UTC+01:00 (CET)
  - Summer (DST): UTC+02:00 (CEST)
- Website: www.amt-biesenthal-barnim.de

Amt Biesenthal-Barnim is an Amt ("collective municipality") in the district of Barnim, in Brandenburg, Germany. Its seat is in the town Biesenthal.

The Amt Biesenthal-Barnim consists of the following municipalities:

1. Biesenthal
2. Breydin
3. Marienwerder
4. Melchow
5. Rüdnitz
6. Sydower Fließ

== Demography ==
Development of Population since 1875 within the Current Boundaries (Blue Line: Population; Dotted Line: Comparison to Population Development of Brandenburg state; Grey Background: Time of Nazi rule; Red Background: Time of Communist rule)

Recent Population Development and Projections (Population Development before Census 2011 (blue line); Recent Population Development according to the Census in Germany in 2011 (blue bordered line); Official projections for 2005-2030 (yellow line); for 2014-2030 (red line); for 2017-2030 (scarlet line)

Amt Biesenthal-Barnim: Population development
within the current boundaries (2020)

Year	Pop.	±% p.a.
1875	8,681	—
1890	8,557	−0.10%
1910	9,090	+0.30%
1925	9,761	+0.48%
1933	10,362	+0.75%
1939	11,350	+1.53%
1946	11,917	+0.70%
1950	12,849	+1.90%
1964	11,498	−0.79%
1971	11,411	−0.11%

Year	Pop.	±% p.a.
1981	10,389	−0.93%
1985	10,273	−0.28%
1990	9,751	−1.04%
1995	10,214	+0.93%
2000	11,563	+2.51%
2005	12,032	+0.80%
2010	11,792	−0.40%
2015	12,038	+0.41%
2020	12,524	+0.79%
2025	13,111	+0.92%
