= Barnim Panorama =

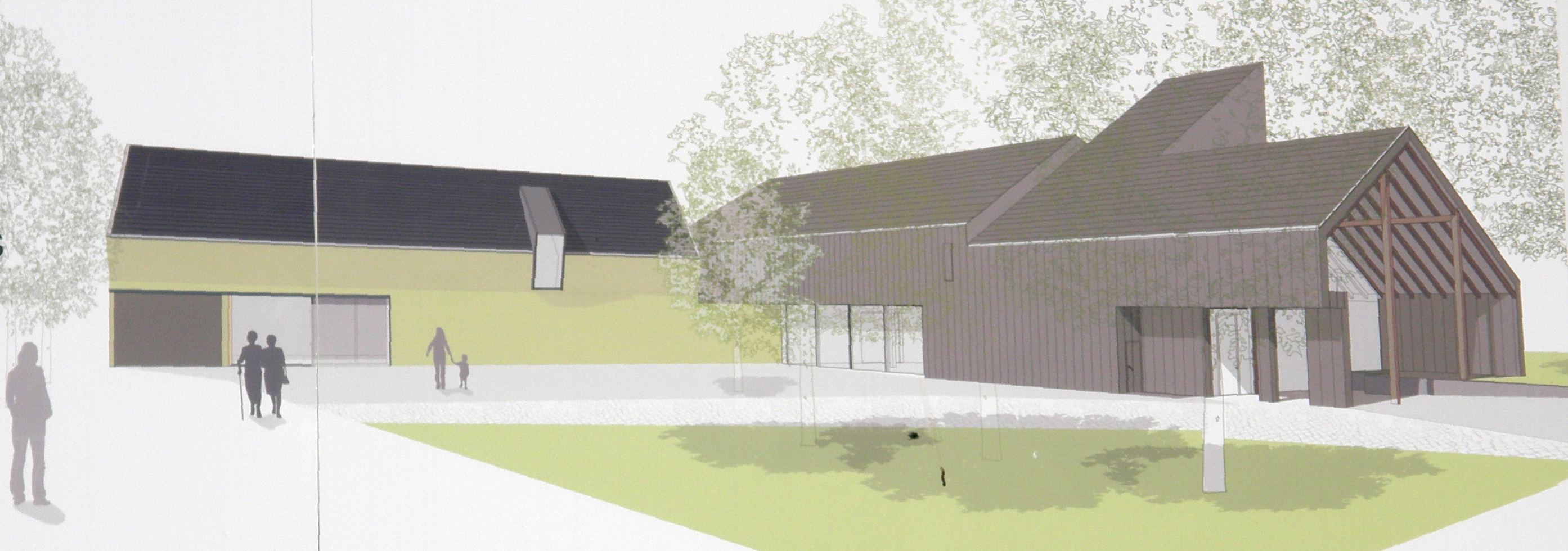
- Graphic of the new building
- Former name: Agrarmuseum Wandlitz, Museum der agraren Produktivkräfte
- Established: 1955 Local Museum; 1975 Agricultural Historic Museum; October 2013: new Building
- Location: Wandlitz
- Coordinates: 52°45′06″N 13°27′19″E
- Type: Agriculture museum
- Visitors: up to 25.000
- Curator: Christine Papendieck
- Architect: Reese Lubic Woehrlin aus Berlin-Prenzlauer Berg (für den Neubau)
- Owner: Municipality Wandlitz
- Parking: On site (no charge)
- Website: www.barnim-panorama.de

The Barnim Panorama, owned by the municipality Wandlitz, was created in September 2013 by combining the Agrarmuseum Wandlitz and the visitor center of the Barnim Nature Park. It has the largest agricultural collection in Brandenburg and offers six themed rooms to give visitors an insight into the 200-year-old history of agriculture in Brandenburg. The museum in the quarter Wandlitz was built in 1955 and could only use provisional arrangements until 2013. Because of the growing demand for more exhibition space and better opportunities to present its collection, the quarter decided to construct a new building across the street from the original museum.

== Founding of the museum ==
In 1955 the Heimatforscher (somebody researching his homeland, home town or region) and owner of the Meierhof Walter Blankenburg (1901–1984) from Wandlitz opened the so-called "Heimatstube". He and his wife Margot had been collecting various commonly used items from rural households with the help of other residents over the course of several years that could now be shown for the first time raising a lot of public interest. Over time and with public funding the "Heimatstube" was expanded into a museum by repurposing two barns, a stable, and a 5,381-square-foot (500m^{2}) large auditorium gifted by the Free German Trade Union Federation was added to cope with the fast growing collection, now largely consisting of agricultural equipment and machinery. The museum staff was supported on an academic level by the Berlin State Museums.

In 1975 the museum was renamed to "Museum der agraren Produktivkräfte" (approximate translation: Museum of the Agricultural Workforce).

The sculpture, created by Walter Arnold, positioned in front of the multi-purpose building in the 1980s was a long-time loan to the museum from a museum in Berlin. The sculpture was given back to its original museum in Berlin in 2011.

== Agricultural Museum Wandlitz (from 1990) ==
After the German reunification the museum would continue to exist with the financial support of the municipality Wandlitz and a newly founded booster club. In 1990 the state Brandenburg changed the museum's name to "Agrarmuseum Wandlitz" (Agricultural Museum Wandlitz). Throughout the following years its collection has become the biggest, historic agricultural collection in Brandenburg. Until spring 2013 the total exhibition space was about 21,571 square foot (2000m^{2}) large. One of the most noticeable exhibits is the historic "Dampfpflug" (a plough working with a steam engine), which was situated outside the museum under a separate roof. Many functional tractors and other agricultural machinery from different eras can be seen at the museum. In other areas of the exhibition, traditional craft and the historic rural household are portrayed. The exhibits of the "Heimatstube" give special insight into the history of the village and its residents.

The museum once owned a farm in the village, where different kind of potatoes were grown.

The museum is financed only by the municipality Wandlitz.

== New buildings and names ==
The museum had planned a new building which would replace the run-down architecture of the old one, and for a long time the museum could not build it, but in 2011 those plans were realized. Near to the old museum, the municipality Wandlitz started the construction of a new complex of buildings, known as the Barnim Panorama, which would house the "Agrarmuseum Wandlitz" (Agricultural Museum Wandlitz), as well as the visitor center of the Barnim Nature Park.

A foundation stone ceremony for the Barnim Panorama was held during the annual museum festival on 15 May 2011. The new complex of buildings has the same appearance as the rest of the villages' stables, barns, and the main building, which is made from stone. The building also resembles a historic "Dreiseithof" (a square farm complex that has buildings on three of its sides). The neighboring landmarked school was integrated into the complex of buildings that form the Barnim Panorama, which is now the new headquarter of the Barnim Nature Park, and provides offices for the management of the museum.

The architects of "Reese Lubic Woehrlin" from Berlin-Prenzlauer Berg won the architectural design competition, and designed the new museum. In total the project cost an estimated 6.2 million €, including approximately 5 million € for the construction. The European Union and the state Brandenburg contributed with 3.7 million € in subsidies.

In 2012 local residents suggested naming the new museum after its founder Walter Blankenburg. The Cultural Affairs Director of the municipality then drafted a resolution to name the Barnim Panorama "Walter-Blankenburg-Hof" (Walter-Blankenburg-Farm), but the booster club of the museum denied the resolution because the lot was not owned by the Blankenburg family. Instead, the booster club wanted to name the whole plaza after Walter Blankenburg. Finally the municipality Wandlitz decided to name a street after Walter Blankenburg: the "Walter-Blankenburg-Weg".

The Barnim Panorama was officially opened on 7 September 2013. The Brandenburg Department of Construction awarded Stefan Woehrlin's team of architects with the "Baukulturpreis" (an award from the state of Brandenburg for architects and civil engineers) on 12 October 2013. The reasons for giving the award to Stefan Woehrlin's team especially underlined their predominant use of environmentally sustainable construction materials, and the design towards building a low-energy house with zero emissions. The awarded money of 2,500 € was gifted to the booster club and the Barnim Nature Park by the architects.

What is especially notable are the walk-on-able map of the local area, and the large outside area with a lot of space for children to play in. The tractor collection is inside an exhibit hall made mostly from glass. Other exhibit objects were rearranged in the new museum.

The whole new building complex provides universal access.

== Exhibition ==
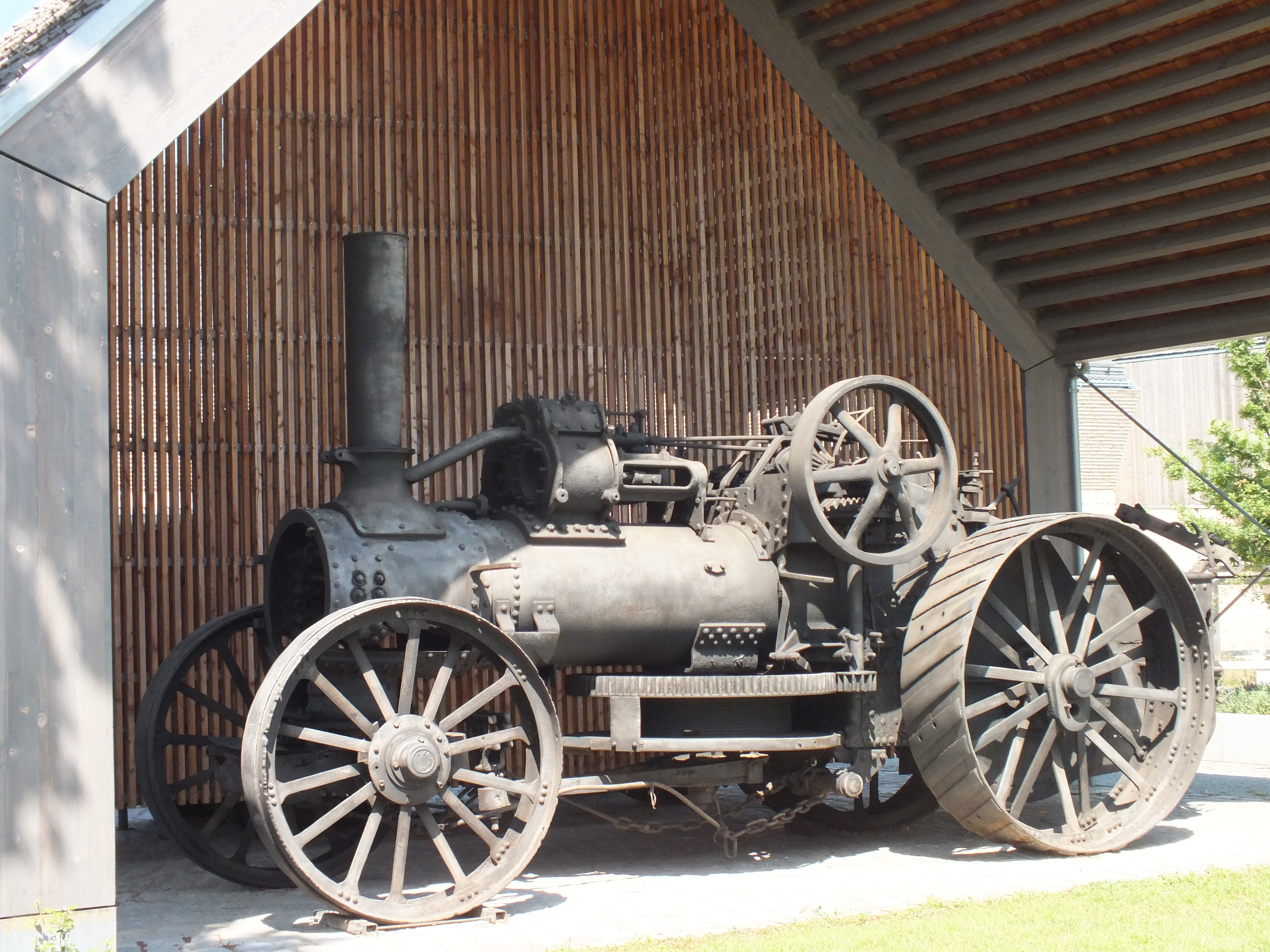
Restored steam plow

The complete former museum now uses three stories of the new building, and the whole exposition is unified under the motto "Geformte und genutzte Landschaft" (Shaped and Formed Landscape). The foyer, a shop, as well as the exhibits "Wild Barnim" (a multimedia installation from fall 2014), "Moving Soil", and the "Tractor herd" are situated on the bottom floor. Visitors will also find the exit to the garden and a depot containing various combine harvesters on the bottom floor. On the upper floor there are two major topics presented: "Stories from the Barnim," and "Rural Life." A portion of the available space is reserved only for special exhibits. Lastly there is a panoramic window that gives the visitors a view upon the Wandlitzer See (lake), and a walk-on-able map of the Barnim Nature Park which simulates a bird's-eye view.

The Barnim Panorama is open every day (except Friday) from 10 a.m. to 6 p.m. The admission fee for adults is 6 € with lower prices for children, families, and groups.

== Exhibits (selection) ==
=== Wild Barnim ===
This modern media presentation was created after a limited competition held by the "Bärlin Team Eventdesign" corporation, and produced in cooperation with the filmmakers "filmfritzen.tv". An infinitely looped movie is projected onto a 45 x 10 foot (14 x 3 m) large, curved surface. It shows the shaping of the Barnim landscape in impressive images. Seven different scenes are shown without the use of a commentator but rather with the sounds of nature and other self-composed sound effects. It aims to teach visitors about the Ice Age and the following melting of the glaciers as well as the adjacent formation of lakes, forests, and swamps. The multimedia installation is rounded off by special coordinated light effects.

=== Special exhibitions ===
2014 – 2015: Out into Nature (from the German: "Raus ins Grüne") deals with the early tourism in the region at the beginning of the 20th century. It especially highlights the influence of the rail road "Heidekrautbahn", the Liepnitzsee (lake), and the Wandlitzer See (lake) as catalysts for the tourism boom that is still noticeable today.

2015 – 2016: Wolf and Human – Searching for Traces in Brandenburg (from the German "Wolf und Mensch – auf Spurensuche in Brandenburg") The once very dense wolf population in Brandenburg was for the last 200 years almost nonexistent. But as the wolf population is starting to grow again and the animals are returning to their historic habitat, many questions arise about how humans and wolves can live together peacefully. The exhibition shows both historic and current aspects of their relationship and aims to provide a platform for the current public discussion.

2016: Waldsiedlung Wandlitz – A Landscape of Power (from the German "Waldsiedlung Wandlitz – Eine Landschaft der Macht") aims to give an historical-critical overview of the SED history of the housing-complex used by the political leadership of the German Democratic Republic from 1958 to 1990.

Visitors are getting insight into the day-to-day life of the SED officials, their families, and their security staff living inside the locked off complex. The exhibition asks about the impact of the housing-complex on the region and provides a geographical overview on its large walk-on-able map. It also highlights the connections between the growing media coverage of the housing-complex in the last years of the German Democratic Republic to the Peaceful Revolution of 1989. The exhibition is accompanied by multiple informative installations on the area of the former housing complex.

It was funded by the state Brandenburg and the Federal Foundation for the Reappraisal of the SED Dictatorship.

== Events ==
The first museum festival took place in 1979. It was celebrated with live music and a parade of all the exhibits that were still intact. The festival became an annual event that takes place in May and offers insight into traditional craft and presentations of special items from the museum's collection to up to 2,500 visitors in the historic center of the quarter Wandlitz. Many small artisans, craftsmen, and artists, as well as voluntary associations, participate in the festival.

Since approximately 1983, annual summer concerts invite visitors to experience the museum in a different way. Musicians play at the museum on four different dates between June and September inside a scenic installation in the museum. In July 2009, for example, melodies from Wolfgang Amadeus Mozart and Ludwig van Beethoven could be heard by the visitors.

== Literature ==
- H. Papendieck: Museum der agraren Produktivkräfte Wandlitz, 1987, published by the museum
