= Anna Boleyn =

1920 film by Ernst Lubitsch

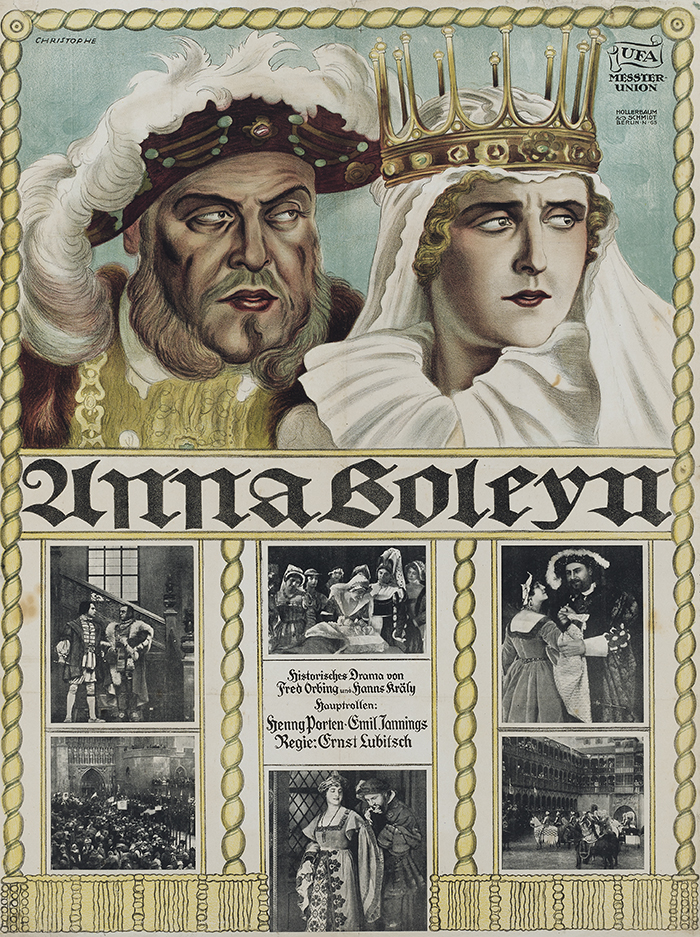
- Theatrical release poster
- Directed by: Ernst Lubitsch
- Written by: Norbert Falk; (as Fred Orbing); Hanns Kräly
- Produced by: Paul Davidson
- Starring: Emil Jannings; Henny Porten; Paul Hartmann
- Cinematography: Theodor Sparkuhl
- Music by: Eduard Prasch (Original); Javier Pérez de Azpeitia (2006)
- Production company: PAGU
- Distributed by: UFA
- Release date: 3 December 1920
- Running time: 118 minutes
- Country: Germany
- Language: Silent film

Anna Boleyn (U.S. title: Deception) is a 1920 German historical film in six acts, directed by Ernst Lubitsch. It tells the story of the second marriage of King Henry VIII of England to Anne Boleyn, and stars Emil Jannings as Henry VIII and Henny Porten as Anne.

The film was produced by Paul Davidson's Union Film, a subsidiary of the giant German company UFA. The film cost an estimated 8 million marks to make, but was able to recoup this from the sale of the American rights alone which brought in $200,000 (14 million marks).

== Plot summary ==
Anna Boleyn (1920)

After years away, Anne Boleyn returns by ship from France to her homeland of England. She stays with her uncle, the Duke of Norfolk, and there she meets her childhood sweetheart, Sir Henry Norris, who is now a knight in the service of King Henry VIII. Henry prefers to spend his days carousing with his men and womanising, rather than with his wife Catherine. On the Queen's name day, Anne is to be introduced to her, as she is to become one of the ladies-in-waiting. When the King does not appear, Catherine refuses to receive guests. When the King announces his arrival at short notice, the Duke of Norfolk escorts his niece from the Queen's chamber. When the door is hastily closed, Anne's dress gets caught, so the King has to free her and is promptly filled with desire for the young woman.

Anne Boleyn becomes a lady-in-waiting to the Queen and is pursued by the King. Her heart belongs to Henry Norris, but he believes that Anne loves the King, who offers her the crown of England. Henry divorces his wife Catherine because she has not given him a male heir to the throne. Since the Pope will not give his consent to the annulment, he breaks away from the Pope and lays the foundations for the Anglican Communion. Despite popular opposition, he marries Anne Boleyn, who had recently rejected Henry Norris's declarations of love, saying they were now too late. She still loves him, but is loyal to the King. When the King disappears during a spring festival and secretly entertains himself with a young woman, the court searches for him. Anne and Norris meet in the forest, and she rejects his declarations of love. The court poet Mark Smeaton sees him leaving Anne. He makes advances to her, but she faints in horror. Henry is told Anne is pregnant, and he returns to her, repentant.

Despite high expectations, Anne Boleyn does not give birth to the desired male heir to the throne, but to a girl named Elizabeth. Henry now loses all interest in his wife and finds a new love in Anne's lady-in-waiting, Jane Seymour. Anne fights for Henry, but she loses him. Mark Smeaton portrays her in a poem as an adulteress and Henry Norris as her secret lover. Norris is arrested at the instigation of the Duke of Norfolk, but is given the opportunity to save his honour at a tournament. He is seriously injured, and Anne Boleyn's emotional reaction leaves Henry in no doubt of her guilt. Anne is arrested. At her trial, Mark Smeaton testifies against her, and she replies that he only wants revenge on her because she had rejected his advances. Smeaton is then tortured so that he "confesses" that he had had an affair with Anne. He is hanged, and Anne Boleyn is beheaded at the behest of King Henry.

== Cast ==
- Emil Jannings as Heinrich VIII, König von England (Henry VIII, King of England)
- Hedwig Pauly-Winterstein as Königin Katherina (Queen Catherine)
- Hilde Müller as Prinzessin Maria (Princess Mary)
- Ludwig Hartau as Herzof von Norfolk (Duke of Norfolk)
- Henny Porten as Anna Boleyn (Anne Boleyn), his niece
- Paul Hartmann as Ritter Heinrich Norris (Sir Henry Norris)
- Aud Egede-Nissen as Johanna Seymour (Jane Seymour)
- Maria Reisenhofer as (Lady Rochford)
- Ferdinand von Alten as Marc Smeton (Mark Smeaton)
- Adolf Klein as Kardinal Wolsey (Cardinal Wolsey)
- Wilhelm Diegelmann as Kardinal Campeggio (Cardinal Campeggio)
- Friedrich Kühne as Erzbischof Crahmer (Archbishop Cranmer)
- Paul Biensfeldt as Der Hofnarr (Jester)
- Karl Platen as Der Leibarzt (Physician)
- Erling Hanson as Graf Percy (Earl Percy)
- Sophie Pagay as Nurse
- Joseph Klein as Sir William Kingston, Kommandant des Towers (Constable of the Tower of London)

== Production ==
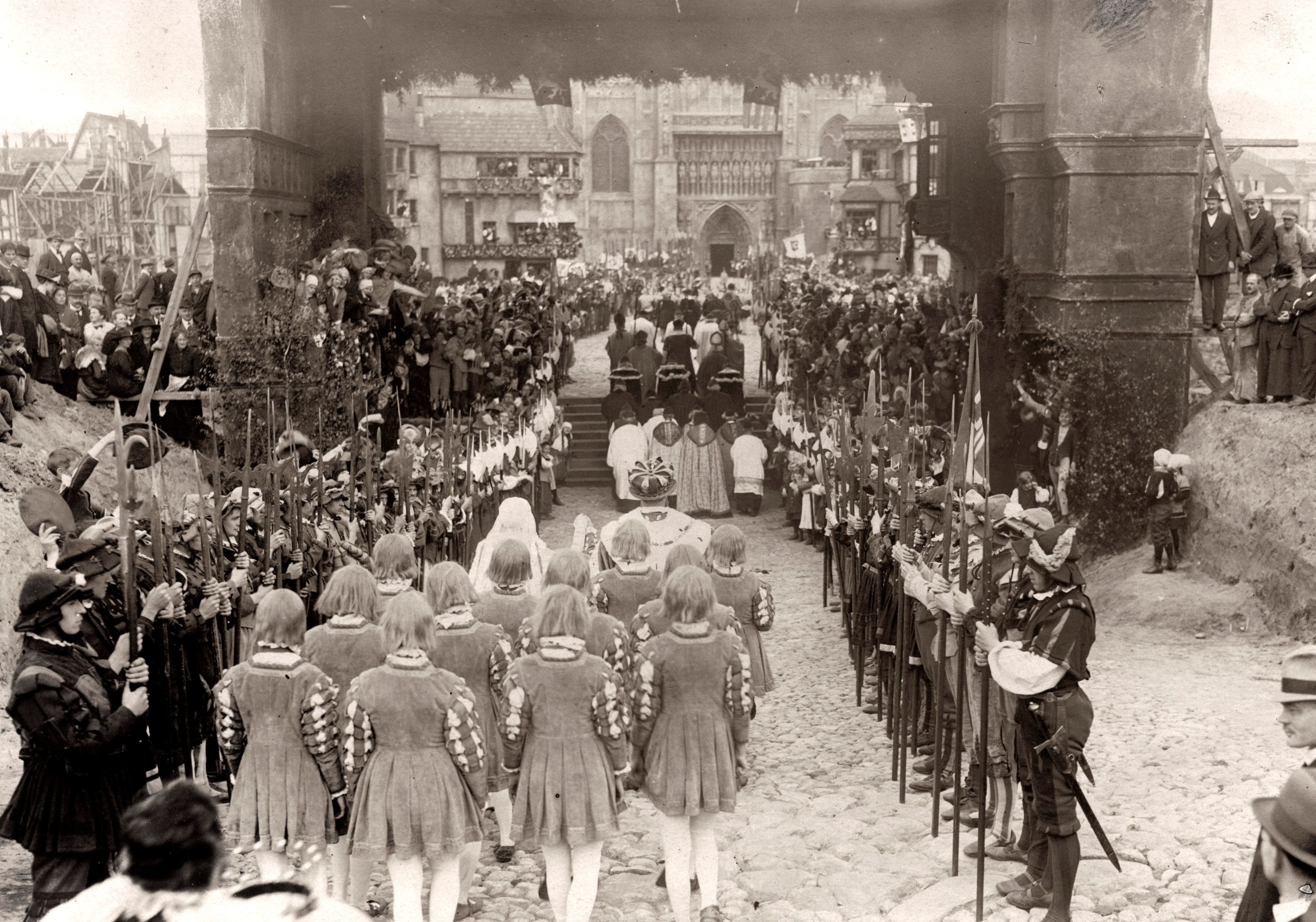
Filming of the new Queen's coronation scene

The film was shot from 20 July to 25 October 1920 at the Ufa-Messter and Ufa-Union studios (Tempelhof Studios) in Berlin. The sets and decoration were designed by Kurt Richter and Ferdinand Bellan. Hans Poelzig was responsible for the props, and the costumes were designed by Ali Hubert. Sets constructed included: a replica of Westminster Abbey, complete with altar, choir stalls, and apse; an old English quarter; a tournament ground; and a road leading from the city gate to the Abbey. The exterior shots were filmed on the Ufa outdoor grounds in Tempelhof and at Liepnitzsee near Wandlitz. A total of more than 4,000 extras participated in the filming.

The censors certified Anna Boleyn as unsuitable for youth on 27 November 1920. The film premiered on 3 December 1920 at the Reform-Lichtspiele in Weimar and the Lessing-Theater in Hamburg.

== Reception ==
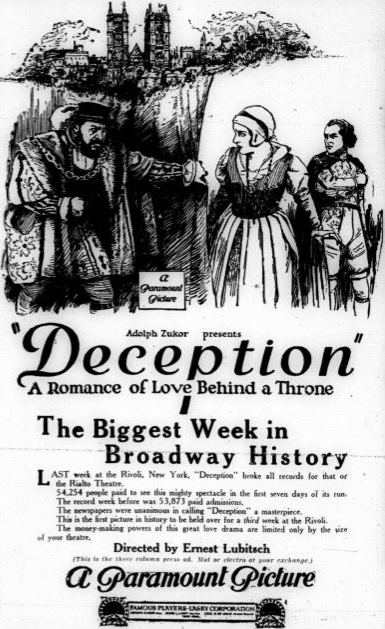
American advertisement for Anna Boleyn with its US distribution title Deception

Contemporary critics praised the "way in which script and direction are twinned in one hundred charming images, so imagination and a masterly hand have created crowd scenes that leave unforgettable impressions." "The film has tension and brevity, logic and escalation, and the cultural-historical elements are wisely dosed," other critics said. The film was "far more successful than Sumurun because the plot was more clearly structured and crowd and individual scenes were skillfully interwoven.

The Lexikon des Internationalen Films (Encyclopedia of International Films) rated Anna Boleyn as "thanks to an outstanding visual composition and the excellent performance by Emil Jannings [...] a remarkable work of the silent film era." The "splendid and tasteful costumes (Ali Hubert) and a refined visual composition" were also positively highlighted.

Anna Boleyn was among Mary Pickford's favourite films, calling it "an example of superb direction and splendid acting, especially that of Emil Jannings. It was the first time on the screen that a King had been made human. It has subtle, satirical humor."

Anna Boleyn was initially distributed with the name Deception when released in the US.

== Home media ==
The film was released in the US by Kino Lorber as part of the box set "Lubitsch in Berlin" in 2005–2007 with English intertitles. It was also released in the UK by Eureka's Masters of Cinema series as part of the box set "Lubitsch in Berlin: Fairy-Tales, Melodramas, and Sex Comedies" in 2010 with German intertitles and English subtitles. It features a score by Javier Pérez de Azpeitia. The restored film is tinted like the original.

== See also ==
- Anne Boleyn in popular culture

== Bibliography ==
- Kreimeier, Klaus (1999). The Ufa Story: A History of Germany's Greatest Film Company, 1918–1945. Berkeley: University of California Press. ISBN 978-0-520-22069-0.
