= Bucher Forest =

Forest area in Berlin and Brandenburg, Germany

Bucher Forst
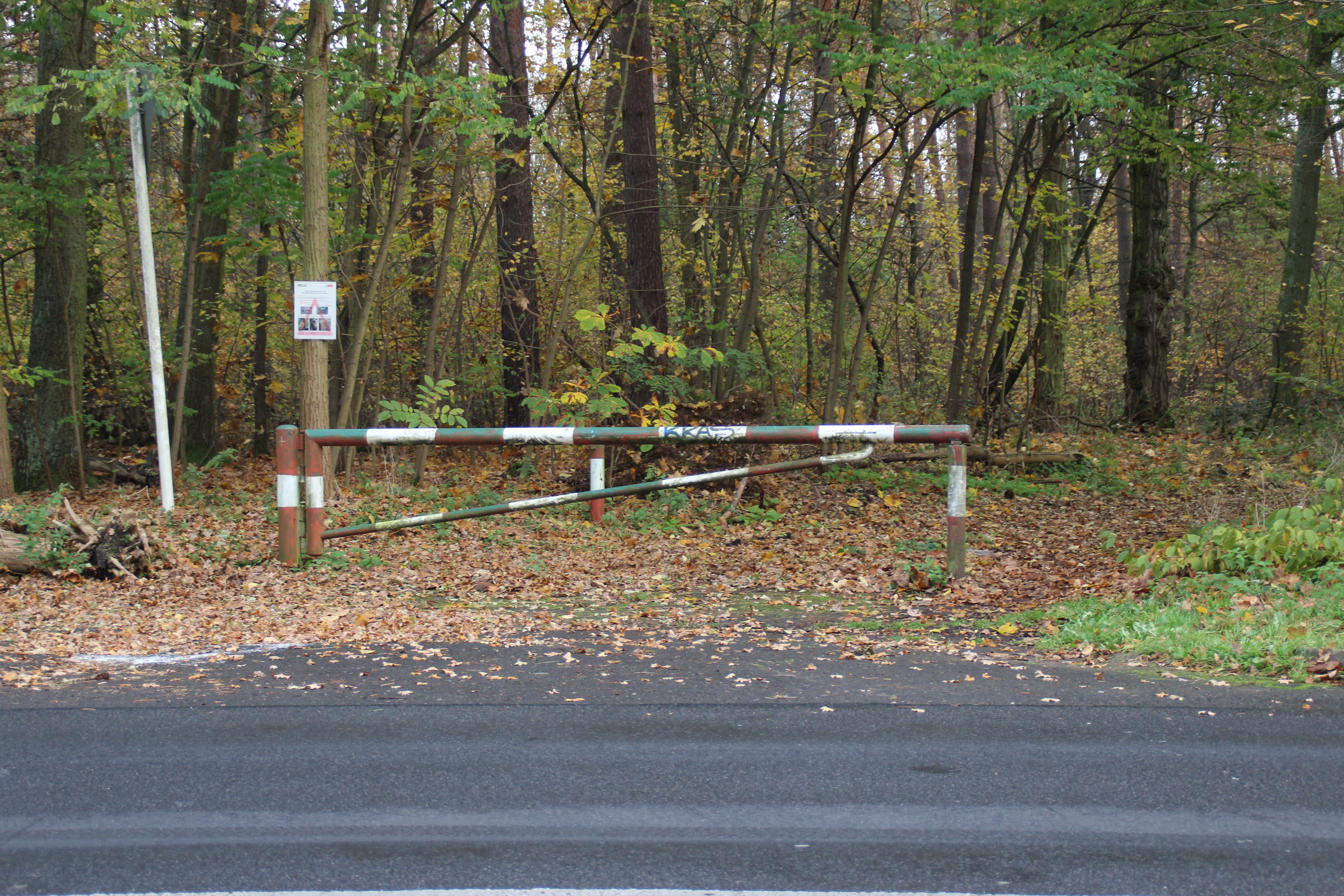
- Barrier opposite the Bogensee nature reserve in the Bucher Forst

- Location within Berlin Location within Germany
- Interactive map of Bucher Forst

Geography
- Location: Berlin and Brandenburg, Germany
- Coordinates: 52°38′53.4″N 13°28′53.13″E
- Area: approx. 1,100 ha

Administration
- Status: Landscape conservation area / nature reserve core
- Governing body: Landesforstamt Berlin (Berlin part)

The Bucher Forst (Bucher Forest) is a forested area located in the north of Berlin (Berlin-Buch) and adjacent Brandenburg (Barnim district) in Germany. It is named after the Berlin locality of Buch on whose territory part of it lies. The forest belongs to the cross-state Barnim Nature Park (Naturpark Barnim).

The total area is around 1,100 hectares, of which about 600 ha lie within Berlin and the remainder in Brandenburg. Of this, approximately 250 ha are covered by high forest (mature woodland), while the remainder is largely wooded land on the former sewage-irrigation fields (Rieselfelder). Several sizeable water bodies lie in the western part; the largest among them is the Bogensee.

== Geography ==
The Bucher Forst lies partly within the Berlin borough of Pankow and partly within the district of Barnim (Brandenburg). Its terrain includes mixed and semi-natural woodlands, wet and dry meadows, former sewage-irrigation fields, and a chain of lakes.

The core part of the forest, around the Bogensee and the lake chain, forms part of the nature reserve Bogenseekette und Lietzengrabenniederung (NSG 32). The surrounding areas are within the landscape-protection areas (LSG) "Buch" in Berlin and "Westbarnim" in Brandenburg.

== History ==
The area of the Bucher Forst has undergone significant change over the last century. Former sewage-irrigation fields were established to treat Berlin’s wastewater; when those ceased operation in 1984, the landscape gradually developed a mosaic of meadows, semi-open forest, tall-forb corridors and wet and dry zones.

Conservation and hydrological works have been undertaken to maintain the reserve’s habitats, including the reactivation of ditches and construction planning for fish passes between the Bogensee chain and the Lietzengraben lowland.

In recent years, discussions on siting wind turbines at the northern edge of Pankow referenced the proximity of the Bucher Forst (LSG "Buch") and the Bogensee-Lietzengraben nature reserve as constraints on development.

== Nature and environment ==
The Bucher Forst contains mixed woodland with beech and oak stands, wet wooded areas and remnants of older forest use (such as old high forest). In the nature reserve around the Bogensee, semi-natural forest and reed-belt zones are home to amphibian spawning grounds and rare saproxylic beetle species. The Bogensee is an important amphibian breeding site within the reserve.

== Recreation and access ==
A network of paths for walkers and cyclists passes through the Bucher Forst. Grazing projects with robust cattle and horses create open habitat mosaics and are part of the visitor experience in the wider Hobrechtswald/Buch landscape. The area is accessible via the S-Bahn station Berlin-Buch and is promoted as part of the Barnim Nature Park's recreational offering.

== Conservation status ==
The core area (Bogenseekette und Lietzengrabenniederung) is designated as a nature reserve (Naturschutzgebiet) under Berlin’s protection regime. The surrounding woodland and meadow areas form part of landscape-protection zones (Landschaftsschutzgebiete) in both Berlin and Brandenburg.
