= Annelie Grund =

German musician, artist and painter

Annelie Grund (born 28 June 1953, Berlin) is a German artist, stained glass artist and musician. She lives in Wandlitz and is married to the architect Manfred Thon.

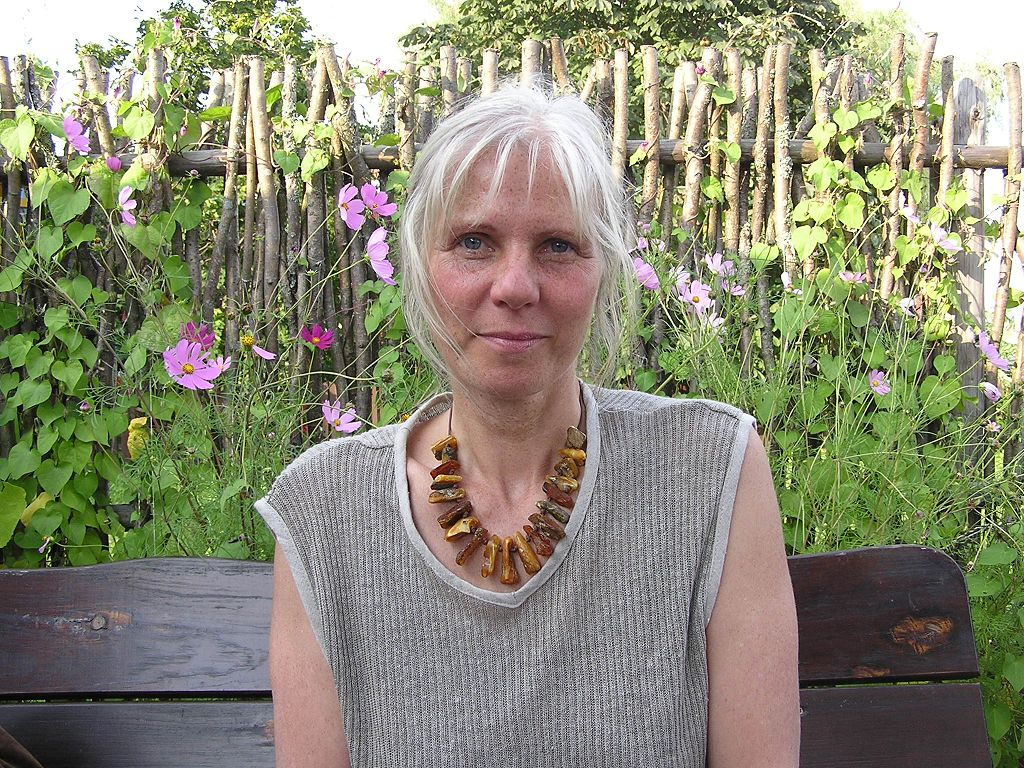
Annelie Grund

== Biography ==
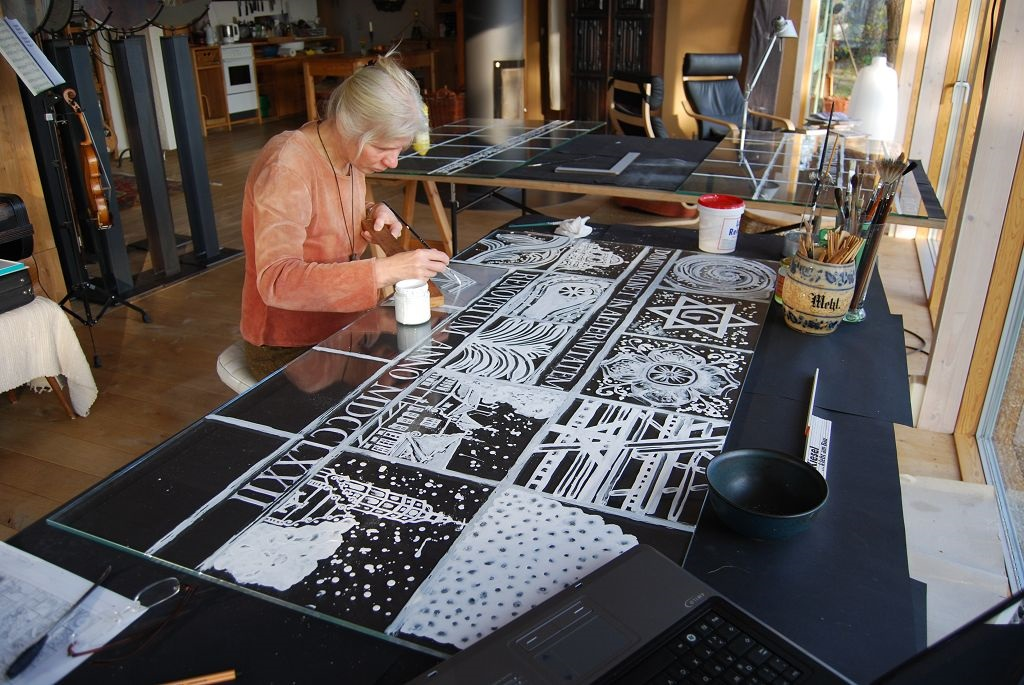
Annelie Grund creating stained glass window

In 1976, she acquired the diploma at the Humboldt University of Berlin in the subjects of art, painting, German language and literature studies. In 1983, she got the master craftsman's diploma as stained-glass artist. Since 1979, she has been a freelance artist and stained-glass artist in her own studio and workshop.

== Music ==
Since her childhood she practices overtone singing. She received lessons by the choir director Christian Bollmann in Düsseldorf and for a long time took part in the Berlin Didgeridoo-Orchestra. She performed music in the DUO Bernstein (1996–2001). Nowadays, she makes music during projects of art with her husband.

== Glass Art ==
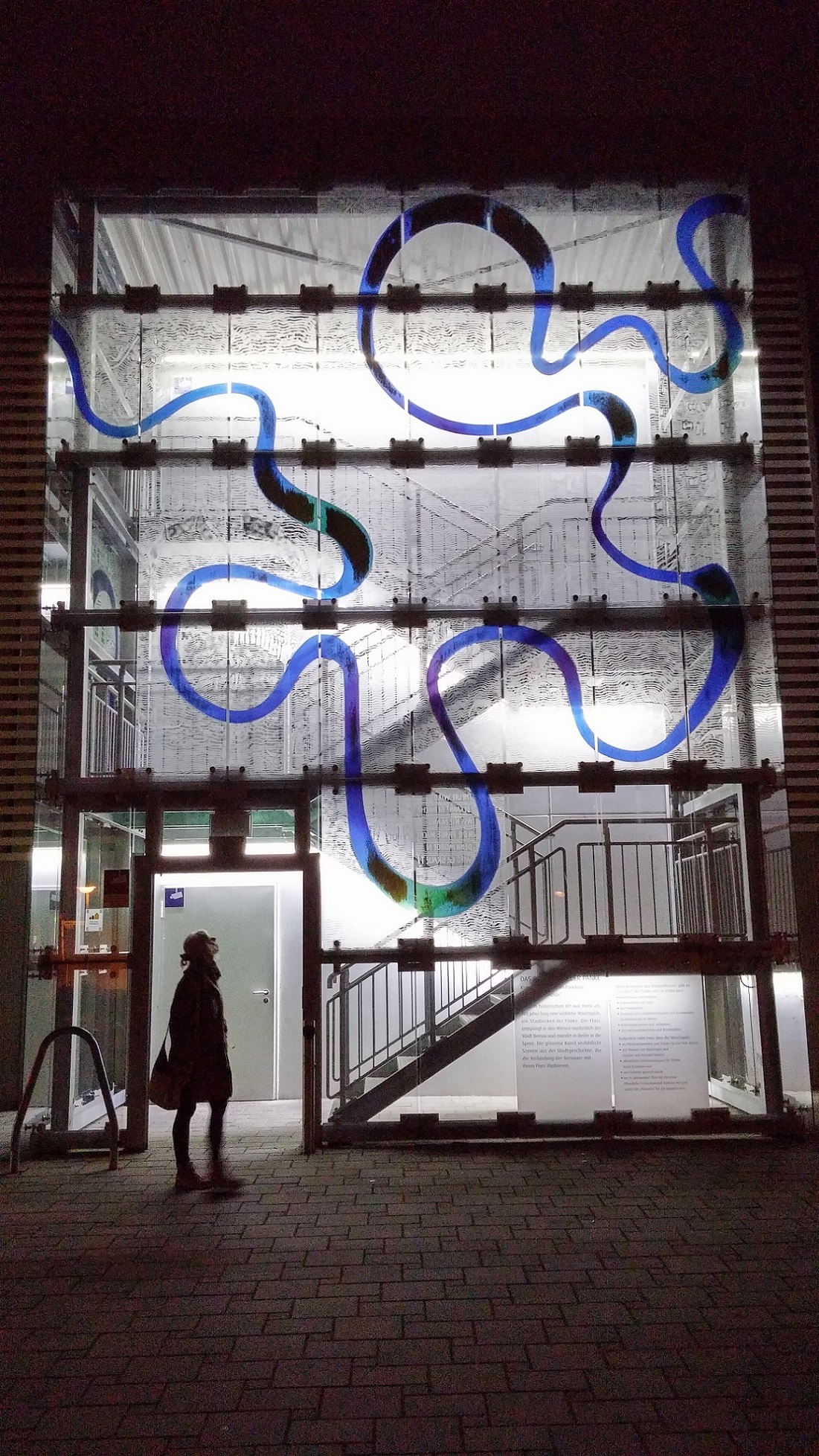
The blue band of the river Panke. Project of glass art in Bernau, 2012

She implemented many projects of glass art which are displayed in public, mostly made of glass, but also of steel and stone, painted windowpanes in churches and freestanding objects of glass and glassware paintings. In 2007, she created the monument (errant block) at the water divide between the rivers Elbe and Oder at the Wandlitzsee. In 2012, she created The blue band of the river Panke, a project of glass art at the staircase of the parking garage in Bernau.

== Works in churches ==
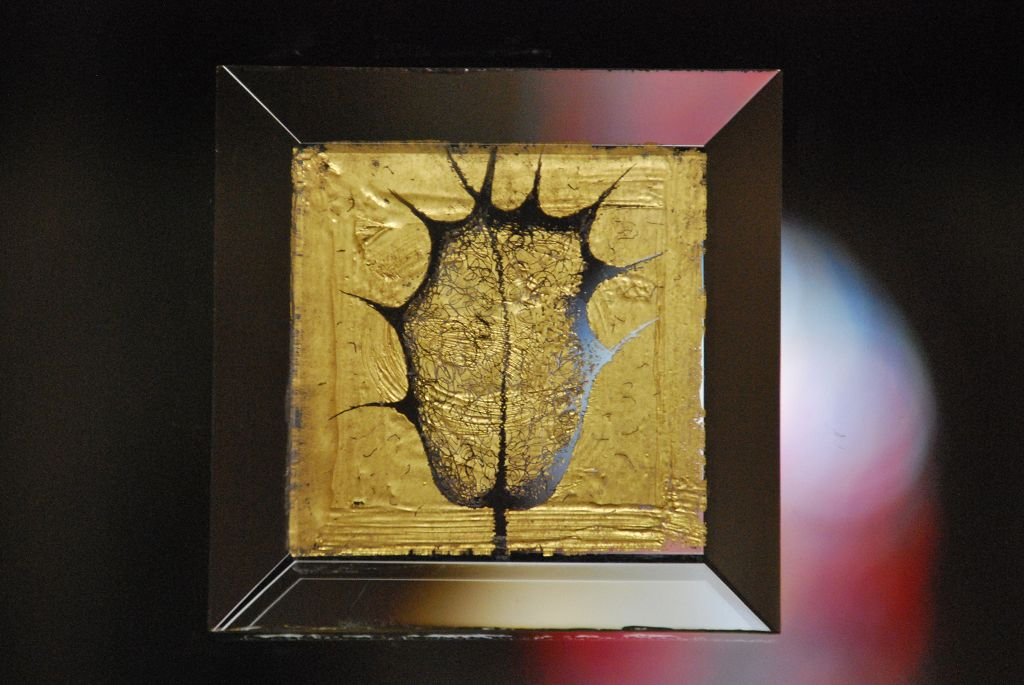
Goldminiatur Stadtpfarrkirche Altlandsberg Brandenburg 2020

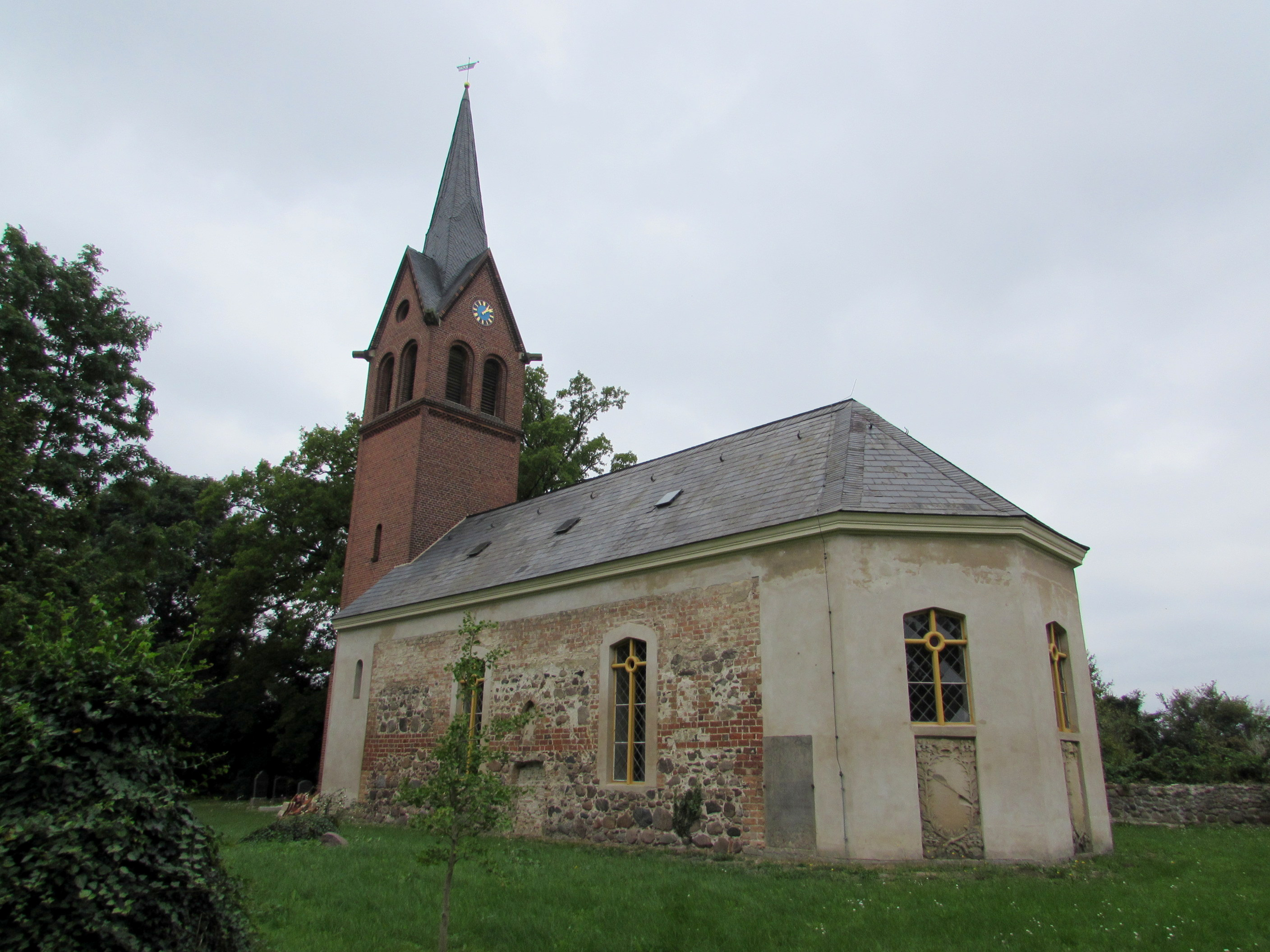
Glass altarpiece in the church in the village of Lünow

- 2003, glass altarpiece in the church in the village of Lünow in Brandenburg
- 2003, Glass altarpiece in the church in the village of Lünow in Brandenburg, Cross and Labyrinth
- 1999–2002, painted windowpanes in the church in Oderberg
- 1999–2016, painted windowpanes in the church in Fürstenberg/Eisenhüttenstadt
- 1999, glass – Sound – Installation in the church in Netzeband
- 1998, painted windowpanes in the church in Helfta
- 1998, Kraftfelder glass – Sound – Installation in Kloster Chorin
- 1997–1999, painted windowpanes in the Catholic church in Malchow/Mecklenburg
- 1996, painted windowpanes in the funeral chapel of the Luisenkirchhof Berlin-Charlottenburg
- 1995, painted windowpanes in a Catholic nurse hostel in Berlin-Biesdorf
- 1994, painted windowpanes in the funeral chapel of the crematory in Berlin-Baumschulenweg
- 1994, painted windowpanes in the New Apostolic Church in Gifhorn
- 1994, painted windowpanes in a chapel in the Hotel Albrechtshof in Berlin
- 1993, painted windowpanes in the church in Teschendorf
- 1991, painted windowpanes in the church in Radeland, Berlin-Spandau

== Exhibitions ==
- 2014, Fachwerkkirche Glambeck, messages and symbols
- 2013, Berlin, Inselgalerie, glass objects
- 2012, Cottbus, Städtische Galerie im Rathaus, glass objects
- 2011, Hobrechtsfelde, Acryl – LED – steles of glass and sound
- 2011, Eberswalde, Städtische Galerie, glass objects
- 2010, Bernau, Galerie Schauß, frottages, drawings
- 2009, Potsdam, Galerie Sehmsdorf, glass objects
- 2007, Müncheberg, Stadtpfarrkirche glass objects, frottages, pastels
- 2006, Prenden, Dorfkirche, glass objects, frottages
- 2004, Fürstenwalde Kunstgalerie im Alten Rathaus, frottages and glass paintings
- 2003, Berlin, Galerie Form und Stil, glass paintings
- 2002, Grimme Kunsthof Barna v. Sartory, steles of glass
- 2002, Oderberg, Nikolaikirche, frottages and sound
- 2001, Wiesenburg, Galerie im Schloß, steles of glass
- 1998, Kloster Chorin, Installation Kraftfelder steles of glass and sound
- 1997, Templin Galerie im neuen Gymnasium, objects of glass and sound
- 1997, Berlin, Ölbergkirche, slides and sound
- 1996, Eberswalde, Städtische Galerie, symbols and countryside
- 1995, Berlin, Galerie im Wartesaal, symbols and countryside

== Monument for the victims of witch-hunt in Bernau ==
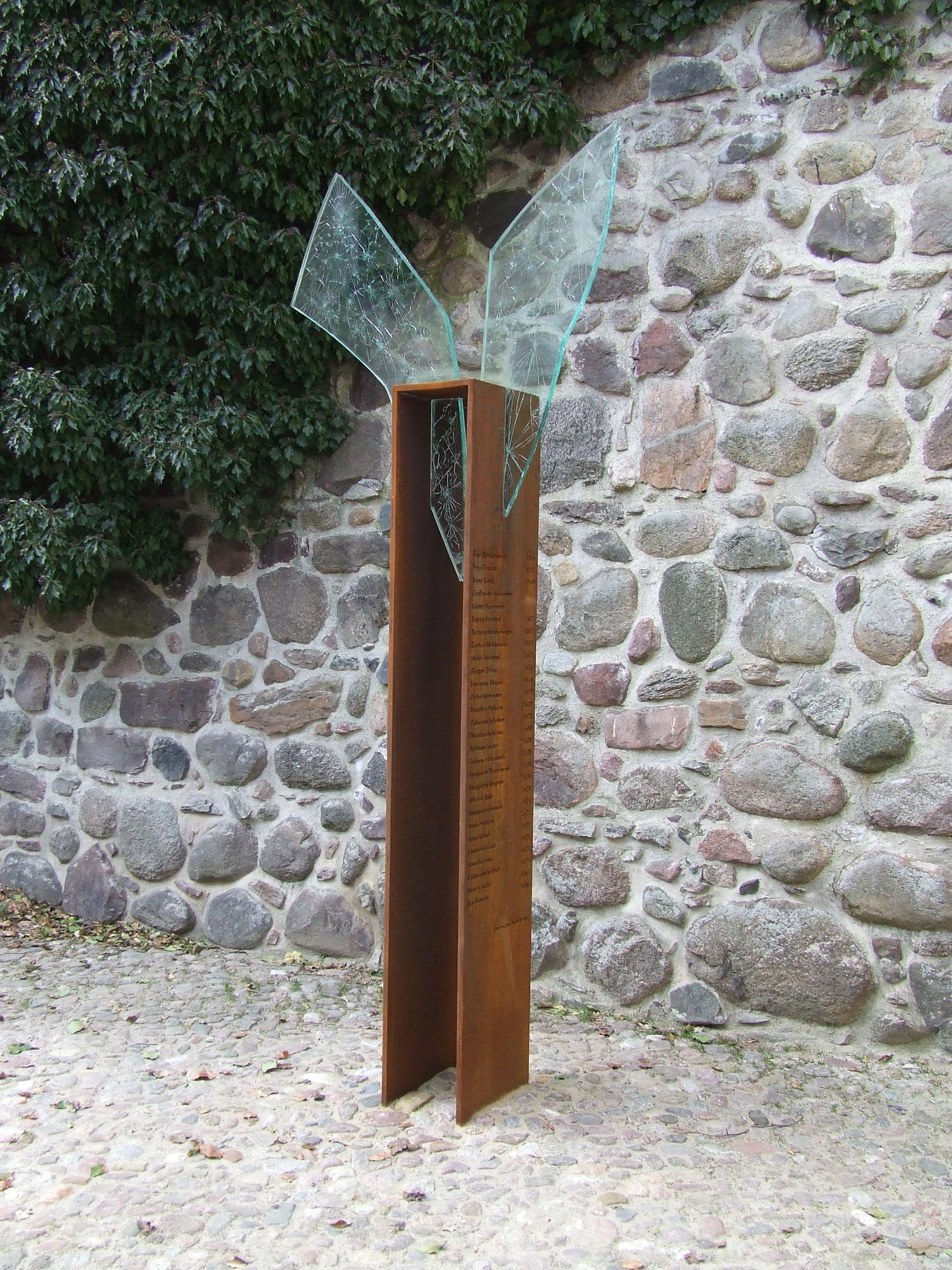
Monument for the victims of witch-hunt in Bernau

In 2005, she created the monument for the victims of witch-hunt in Bernau with the support of the state of Brandenburg, the district of Barnim, the city of Bernau and donations of citizens of Bernau.

== Bibliography ==
- Herbert Schirmer: Annelie Grund. Objekt, Grafik, Malerei, in: 38 Künstler in Barnim, Hrsg: Sabine Voerster. Infopunkt Kunst. Netzwerk für Bildende Kunst und Kunsthandwerk in Barnim, Wandlitz–Prenden 2015, no pagination (Annelie Grund. Objet d'art, art design, painting)
- Anita Bauermeister: Die Bleiglasfenster, in: 100 Jahre Kirche Sophienstädt 1914–2014, Hrsg.: Evangelische Kirchengemeinde Ruhlsdorf–Marienwerder–Sophienstädt, 2014, p. 18–20, vgl. https://web.archive.org/web/20160304002017/http://www.kirche-ruhlsdorf.de/sophien.htm (stained glass windows in the church of Sophienstädt)
- Tom Norberg: Glas in Museen fotografieren in: Glashaus/Glasshouse, Internationales Magazin für Studioglas, Krefeld, Nr. 02/ 2013, p. 18 (Taking photos of glass in museums)
- Gunda Hörner: Glück und Glas, in: Handmade Kultur Magazin, Hrsg.: Handmade Kultur Verlag Hamburg (HKV Hamburg GmbH), Hamburg, Nr. 06/ 2012, pp. 52–55 (Happiness and Glass)
- Sabine Horn: Fernsehbeitrag rbb, Enthüllung des Denkmals für die Opfer der Hexenverfolgung Bernau – Ein Jahr danach, 30. Oktober 2006 (television report: One Year after the inauguration of the monument for the victims of witch-hunt in Bernau)
- Thomas Steierkoffer: Hörstück "Hexen" – Der Professor und die Künstlerin, rbb, 19. Februar 2006 (radio feature: Witches – the Professor and the artist)
- Klaus Lampe: Radio Essay zur Enthüllung des Denkmals für die Opfer der Hexenverfolgung Bernau, rbb, 29. Oktober 2005 (radio feature: Inauguration of the monument for the victims of witch-hunt in Bernau)
- Richard H. Gross: Stained glass in Germany, in: Stained Glass, Hrsg.: Stained Glass Association of America, Lee's Summit, Spring 1996, p. 42
