= Villa Bogensee =

- Waldhof am Bogensee
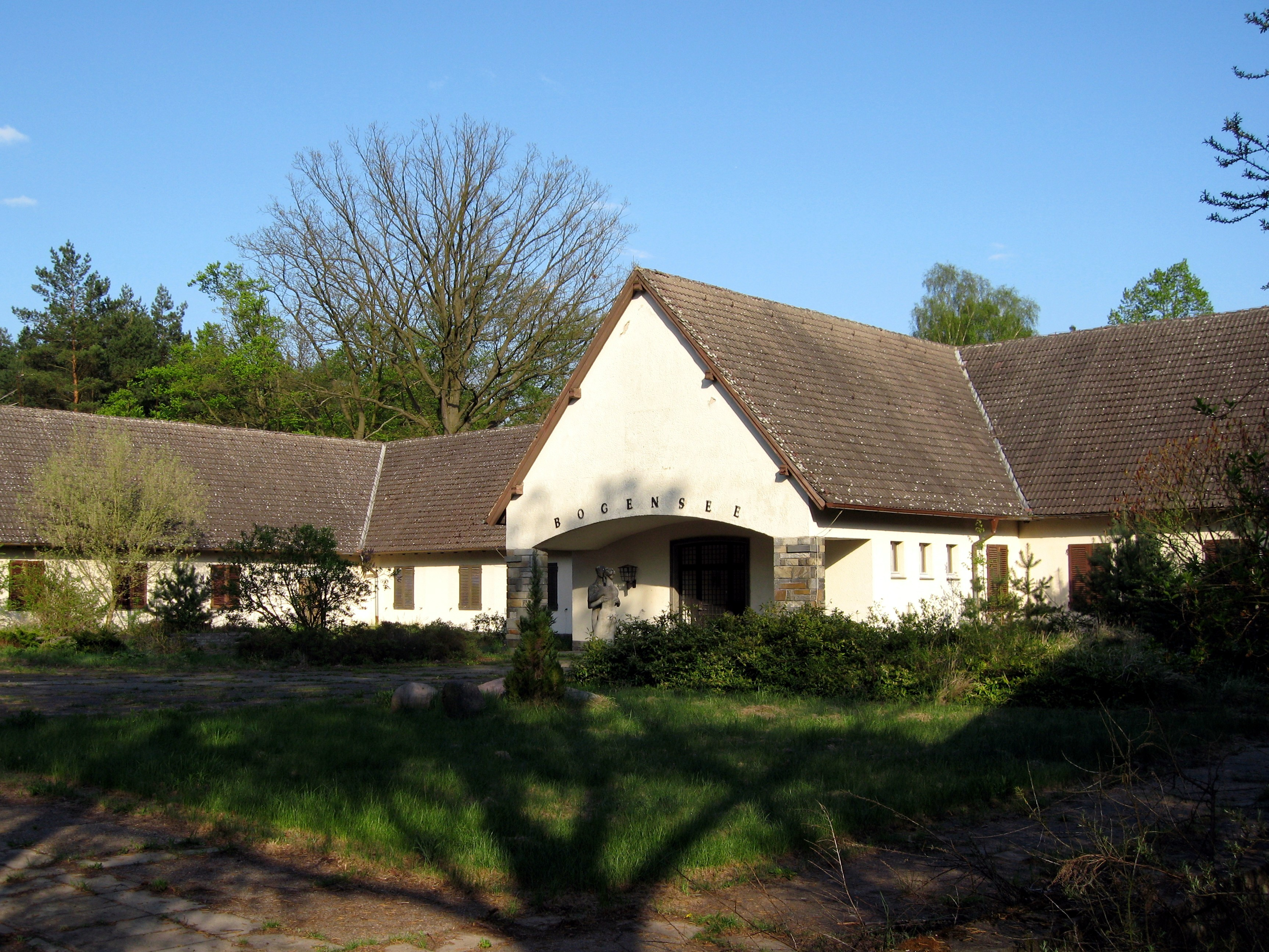
- Villa Bogensee (2008)
- Etymology: Lake Bogensee

General information
- Location: Wandlitz, Germany
- Coordinates: 52.7742°N 13.5263°E
- Completed: 1939
- Client: Joseph Goebbels
- Owner: City of Berlin

Technical details
- Floor area: 1,600 square metres (17,000 sq ft)

Villa Bogensee (German: Waldhof am Bogensee) is a residential building located by Lake Bogensee, near the town of Wandlitz, Germany, some 40 kilometres (25 mi) north of Berlin.

It was constructed in 1939 as a country retreat for Joseph Goebbels. He entertained family as well as political connections there, and reputedly used it as a 'love nest' with his mistresses.

The c. 1,600 square metres (17,000 sq ft), 70-room building is situated on a 17 hectares (42 acres) plot which was gifted to Goebbels by the City of Berlin in 1936.

Berlin city council has attempted unsuccessfully to give away the building for free to anyone prepared to take on its restoration and upkeep, to avoid having to demolish it, at an estimated cost of EUR 50 million. It is costing the council c. EUR 280,000 in annual maintenance costs. The council will vet interested parties, however, to prevent the property ending up in the hands of right wing groups.

In early 2024, fake news appeared on social media falsely claiming that the President of Ukraine, Volodymyr Zelenskyy, had acquired the building.
