= Zerpenschleuse =

- Ortsteil, village, former municipality
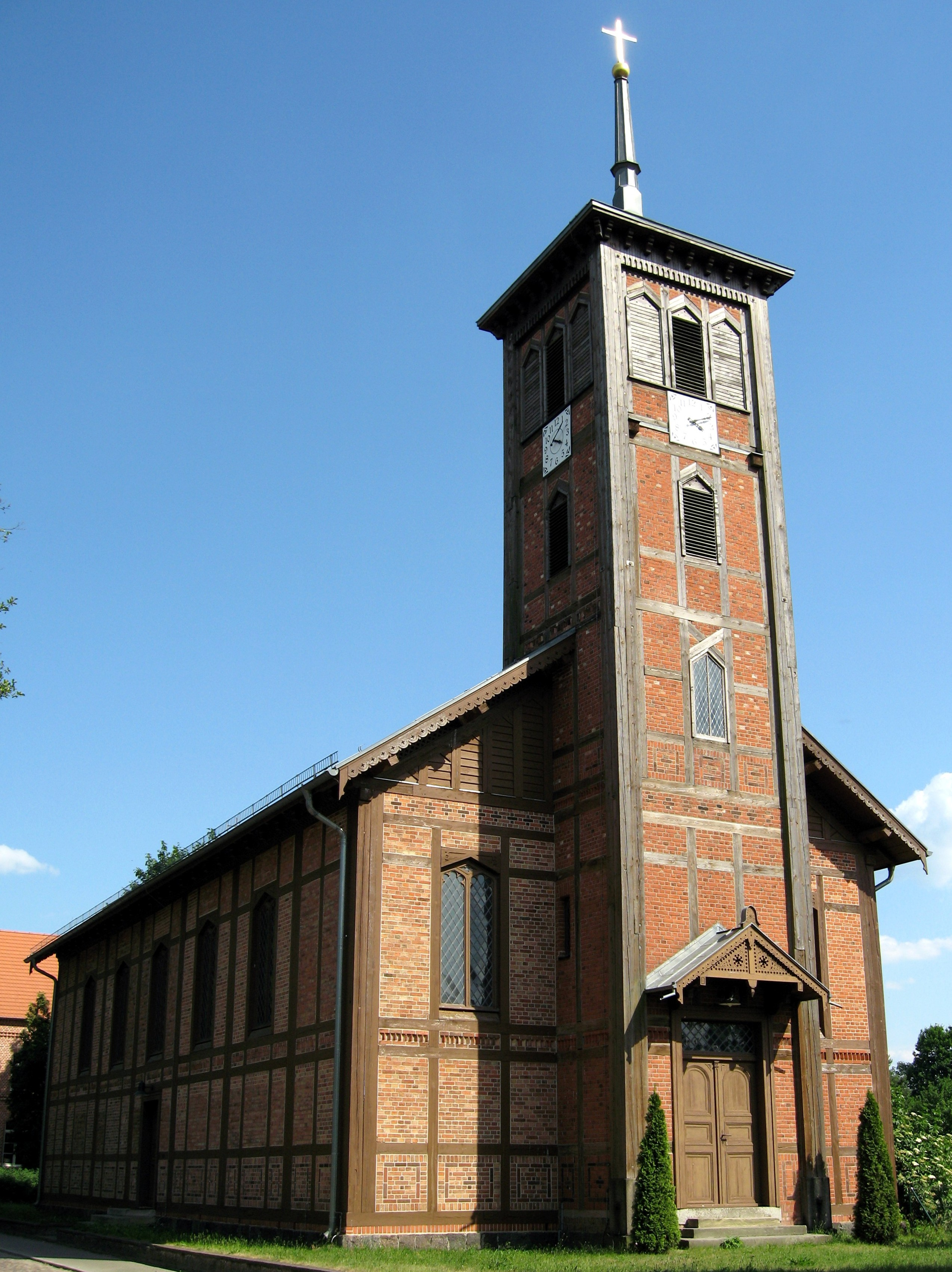
- La chiesa

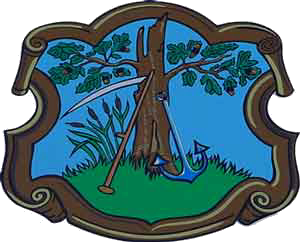
- Coat of arms
- Interactive map of Zerpenschleuse
- Coordinates: 52°51′08″N 13°31′40″E
- Country: Germany
- Elevation: 39 m (128 ft)
- Postal code: 16348
- Area code: 033395

Zerpenschleuse is a populated place in the municipality of Wandlitz, Barnim, Brandenburg, Germany.

== History ==
Until 2003, when it was merged into Wandlitz, Zerpenschleuse was its own municipality. From 1815 to 1945, Zerpenschleuse was part of the Prussian Province of Brandenburg, from 1945 to 1952 of the State of Brandenburg, from 1952 to 1990 of the East German Bezirk Frankfurt and since 1990 again of Brandenburg.

== See also ==
- Liebenwalde
- Marienwerder, Brandenburg
- Schorfheide
