= Bogensee =

Lake in Brandenburg, Germany

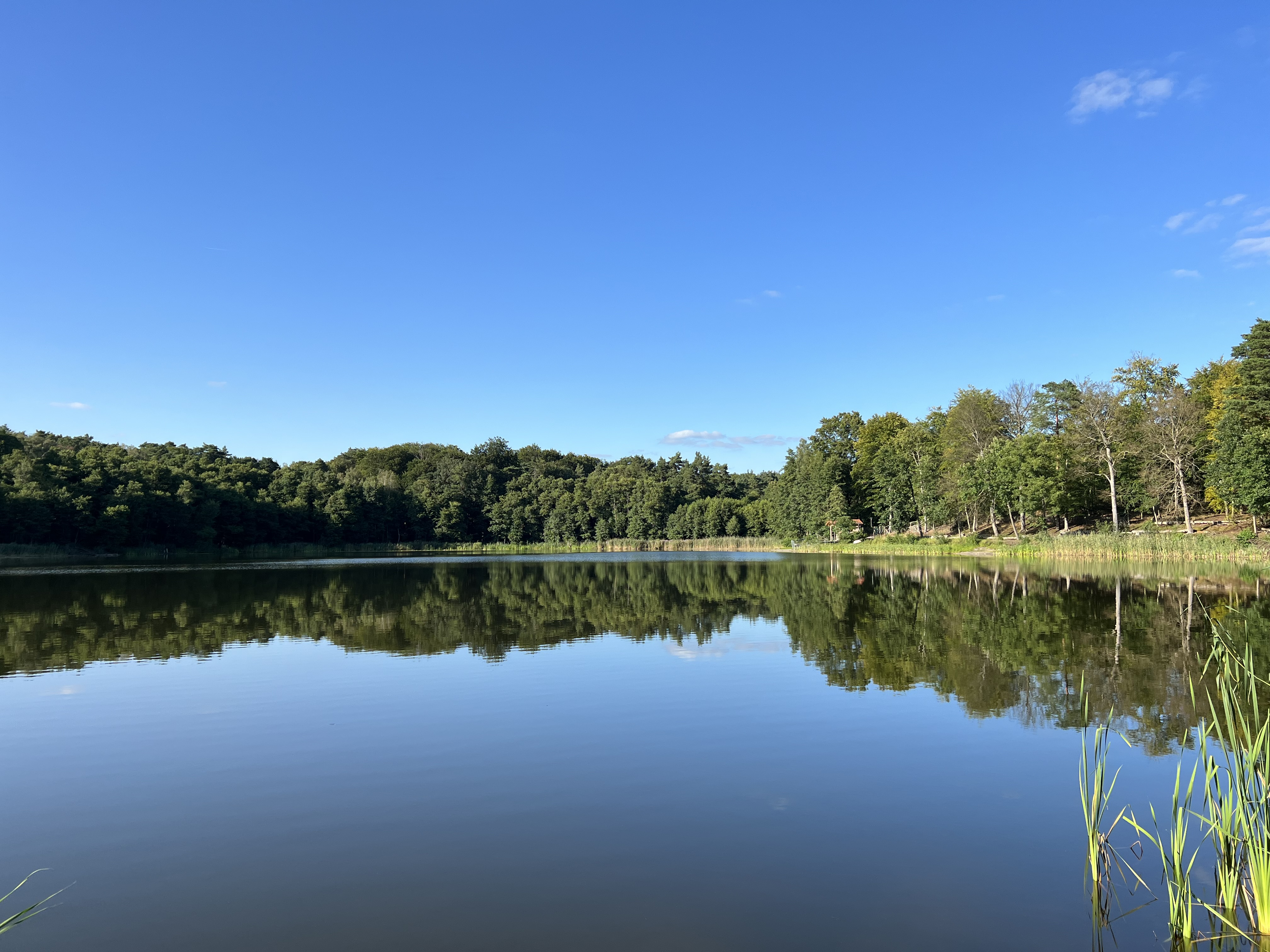

- Location within Brandenburg
- Location: Wandlitz, Brandenburg, Germany
- Coordinates: 52°46′23″N 13°31′51″E
- Type: Glacial lake
- Basin countries: Germany
- Surface area: 9,200 m^{2} (99,000 ft^{2})
- Max. depth: 2.5 m (8.2 ft)

Bogensee is a small lake near Wandlitz in the German state of Brandenburg, located about 15 kilometres (9.3 mi) north of the Berlin city limits.

The oval-shaped lake, a relic of the last ice age, is located on the Barnim Plateau and part of the Barnim Nature Park. It covers an area of approximately 9,200 m^{2} (99,000 ft^{2}), and is 180 m (590 ft) in width (west to east) and 300 m (980 ft) in length (south to north). The maximum depth is given as 2.5 m (8.2 ft). The surrounding estates of Lanke manor were acquired by the City of Berlin in 1919. There are no buildings, paths or beaches directly on the banks of the lake.

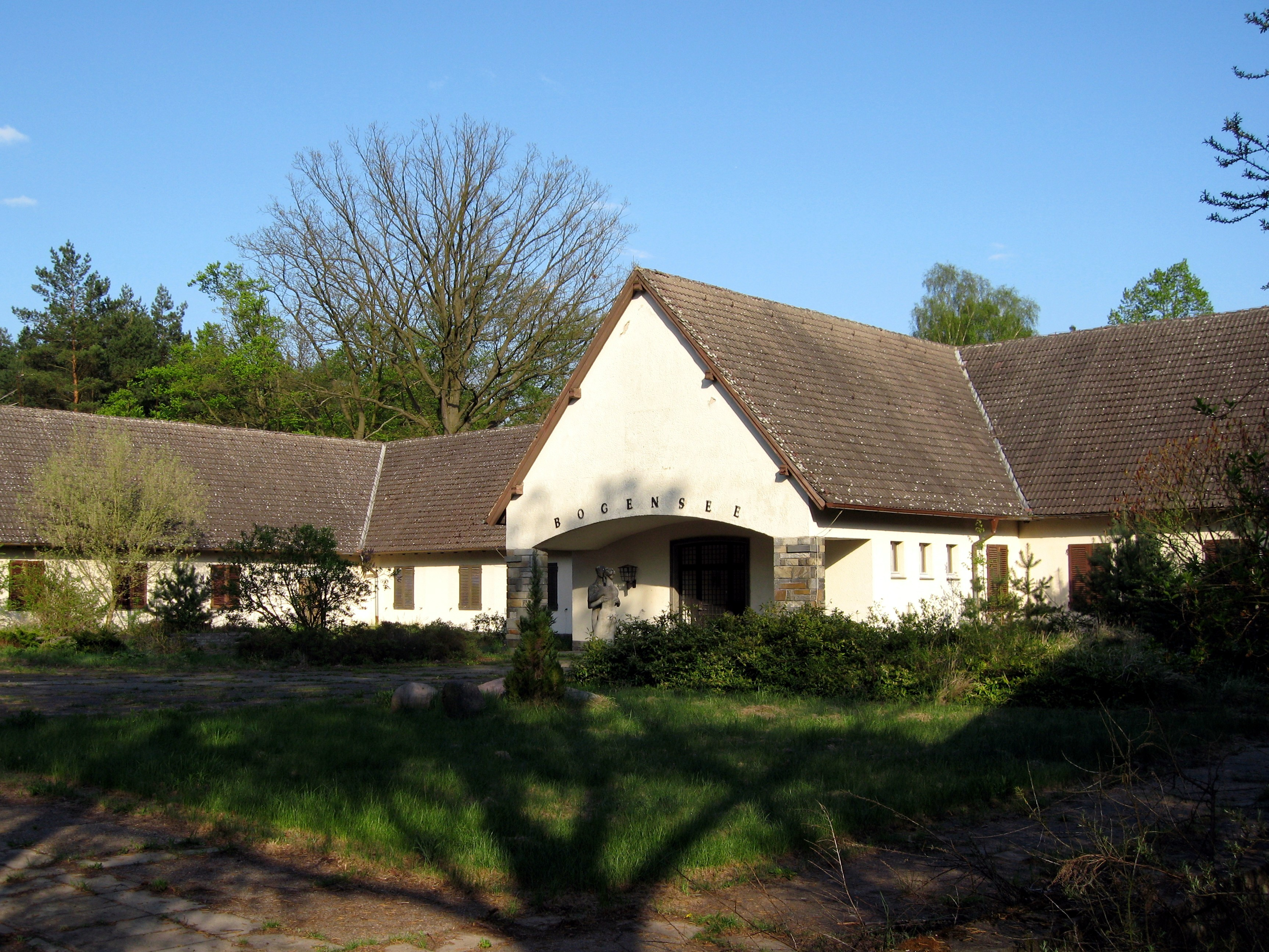
Bogensee country house, 2008 condition

Bogensee is known for the nearby Villa Bogensee, the former summer retreat of Nazi minister Joseph Goebbels, located approximately 500 m (1,600 ft) northwest of the shore. The premises were dedicated to Goebbels by the Berlin city administration on the occasion of his 39th birthday in 1936; he had an extended country home erected at the site until 1939, including a private cinema, a bunker, and adjacent SS barracks. Co-financed by the UFA film company, the building became a popular venue for movie actors like Zarah Leander, Emil Jannings and Heinz Rühmann.

Temporarily seized by the Soviet Military Administration after World War II, the former country house was included into the newly established academy of the East German Free German Youth (FDJ) association. A wide building complex was erected from 1951 onwards, according to plans designed by Hermann Henselmann in a Stalinist style. Since German reunification in 1990, most of the buildings have been empty. As of 2018, the property had remained unoccupied for two decades.

== See also ==
- List of lakes in Germany
- Carinhall
