= Wandlitz =

- Municipality
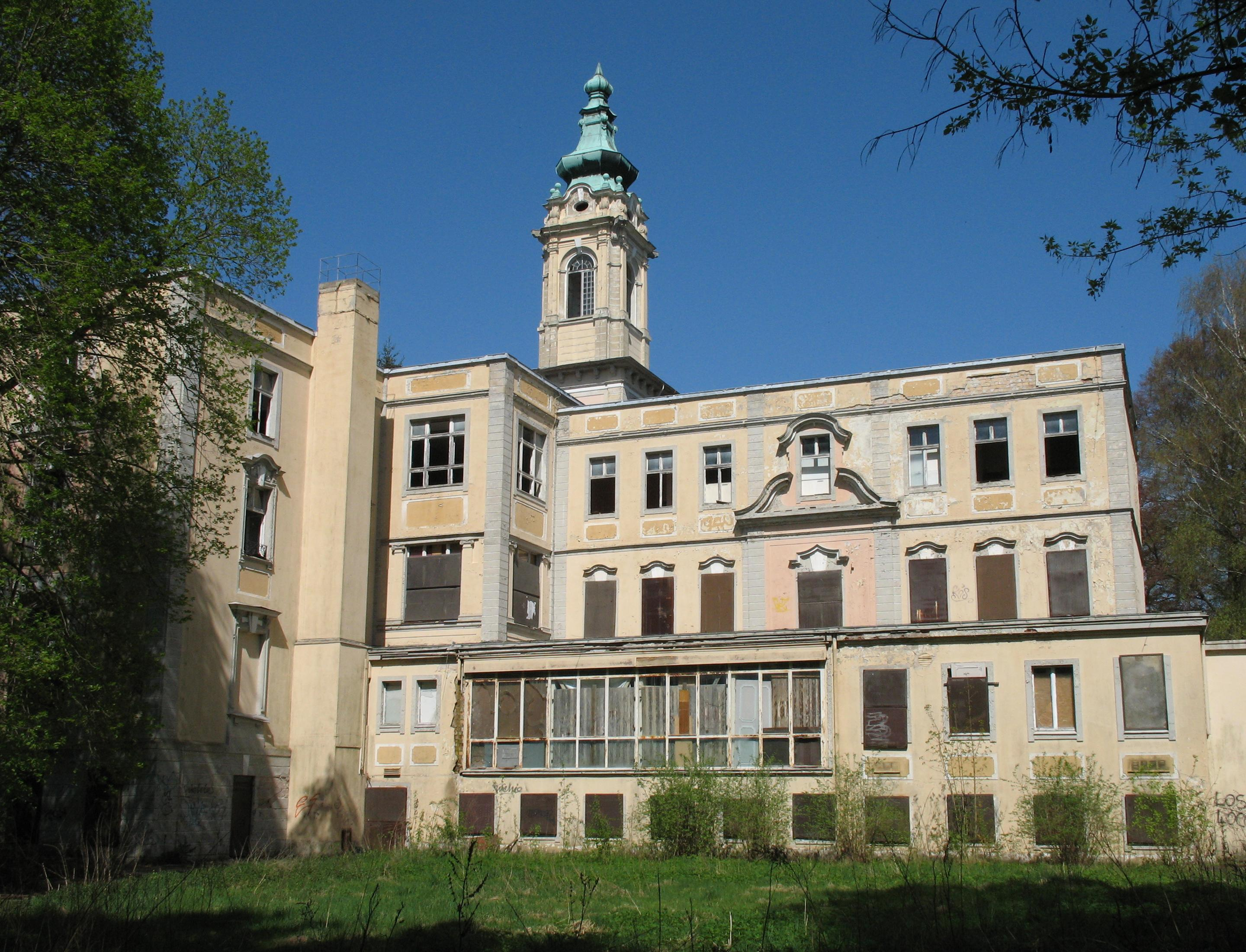
- Castle Dammsmühle in Schönwalde

- Coat of arms

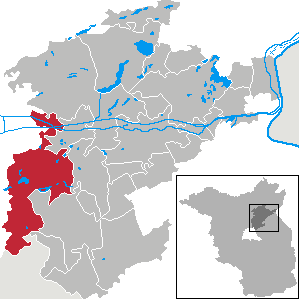
- Location of Wandlitz within Barnim district
- Interactive map of Wandlitz
- Location within Germany Location within Brandenburg
- Coordinates: 52°45′00″N 13°26′59″E
- Country: Germany
- State: Brandenburg
- District: Barnim
- Subdivisions: 9 Ortsteile

Government
  - Mayor (2019–27): Oliver Borchert

Area
  - Total: 162.84 km^{2} (62.87 sq mi)
- Elevation: 59 m (194 ft)

Population (2025-12-31)
  - Total: 24,633
  - Density: 151.27/km^{2} (391.79/sq mi)
- Time zone: UTC+01:00 (CET)
  - Summer (DST): UTC+02:00 (CEST)
- Postal codes: 16348
- Dialling codes: 033397
- Vehicle registration: BAR
- Website: www.wandlitz.de

Wandlitz (German pronunciation: [ˈvandlɪts]) is a village, a borough (Ortsteil) and an independent municipality in the Landkreis (district) of Barnim, in Brandenburg, Germany. It is situated 25 km north of Berlin, and 15 km east of Oranienburg. The municipality was established in 2004 by merger of the nine villages Basdorf, Klosterfelde, Lanke, Prenden, Schönerlinde, Schönwalde, Stolzenhagen, Wandlitz and Zerpenschleuse.

The communal government of the Amtsfreie Gemeinde (independent municipality) of Wandlitz has its seat in Wandlitz directly. It consists of deputies from the several parts of the commune and in accordance with the election results of the existing parties here.

== Demography ==
The post-war influx of refugees from eastern regions led to a rise in the population. The population growth stagnated during the communist era. After the fall of the Berlin Wall, the population began a rising tendency again.

Development of Population since 1875 within the current Boundaries (Blue Line: Population; Dotted Line: Comparison to Population Development of Brandenburg state; Grey Background: Time of Nazi rule; Red Background: Time of Communist rule)

Recent Population Development and Projections (Population Development before Census 2011 (blue line); Recent Population Development according to the Census in Germany in 2011 and 2022 (blue bordered line); Official projection for 2024-2040 in three variants (dotted lines 2025-2040)

Wandlitz: Population development
within the current boundaries (2025)

Year	Pop.	±% p.a.
1875	6,868	—
1890	7,474	+0.57%
1910	8,793	+0.82%
1925	9,309	+0.38%
1933	11,069	+2.19%
1939	13,163	+2.93%
1946	15,674	+2.53%

Year	Pop.	±% p.a.
1950	16,180	+0.80%
1964	15,851	−0.15%
1971	16,415	+0.50%
1981	14,762	−1.06%
1985	14,560	−0.34%
1990	14,194	−0.51%
1995	15,744	+2.09%

Year	Pop.	±% p.a.
2000	18,494	+3.27%
2005	20,463	+2.04%
2010	21,704	+1.18%
2015	22,095	+0.36%
2020	23,485	+1.23%
2025	24,633	+0.96%

== Sightseeing ==
- Wandlitzsee lake
- The nearby lake of Liepnitzsee
- The Agricultural Museum in Wandlitz-old village (Barnim Panorama)
- The Steam Railway Museum in Basdorf (Heidekrautbahn-Museum)
- The International Museum of Circus Performers in Klosterfelde (Internationales Artistenmuseum)
- Several old churches
- Beautiful lakes in the surrounding area such as Wandlitzsee, Liepnitzsee, Bogensee, Rahmersee, Stolzenhagener See
- In the woods North East of the village Wandlitz is the small Bogensee with a former summer house of Joseph Goebbels, later part of the academy of the Free German Youth organization. Today the area belongs to the Berlin state forests and the buildings are to let.

== Culture ==
- Goldener Löwe Kulturbühne: regular concerts, cabaret, opera, poetry readings, and comedy events.
- Studio of stained glass artist Annelie Grund

== Sport & Leisure ==
- Windsurfing school and board hire on Wandlitzsee lake
- public beach and bathing area on Wandlitzsee
- Horse-riding
- 27-hole golf-course at nearby Prenden

== Twin towns ==
- La Ferrière, Vendée, France (since 1997)
- Ballainvilliers, France (in partnership with Basdorf since 2013)
- Trzebiatów, Poland (since 2002)

== History ==
Wandlitz was first mentioned as Slavic Vandlice in a 1242 deed, when the Margraves of Brandenburg John I and Otto III sold it to the Lehnin Abbey. The word means men who live at the water. Situated on the Barnim plateau among woods and lakes it became a popular recreation area especially in the 20th century. Since 1901 the Heidekrautbahn railway line links Wandlitz with Berlin.

From 1815 to 1945, Wandlitz was part of the Prussian Province of Brandenburg, from 1945 to 1952 of the State of Brandenburg, from 1952 to 1990 of the East German Bezirk Frankfurt and since 1990 again of Brandenburg.

Shortly after World War II, the village was home to an orphanage of children from Berlin. The orphanage, run by nuns, later became a holiday spot for visiting high-ranking Communist party members. The children of the small orphanage were frowned upon as second-class citizens by villagers, and often went hungry.

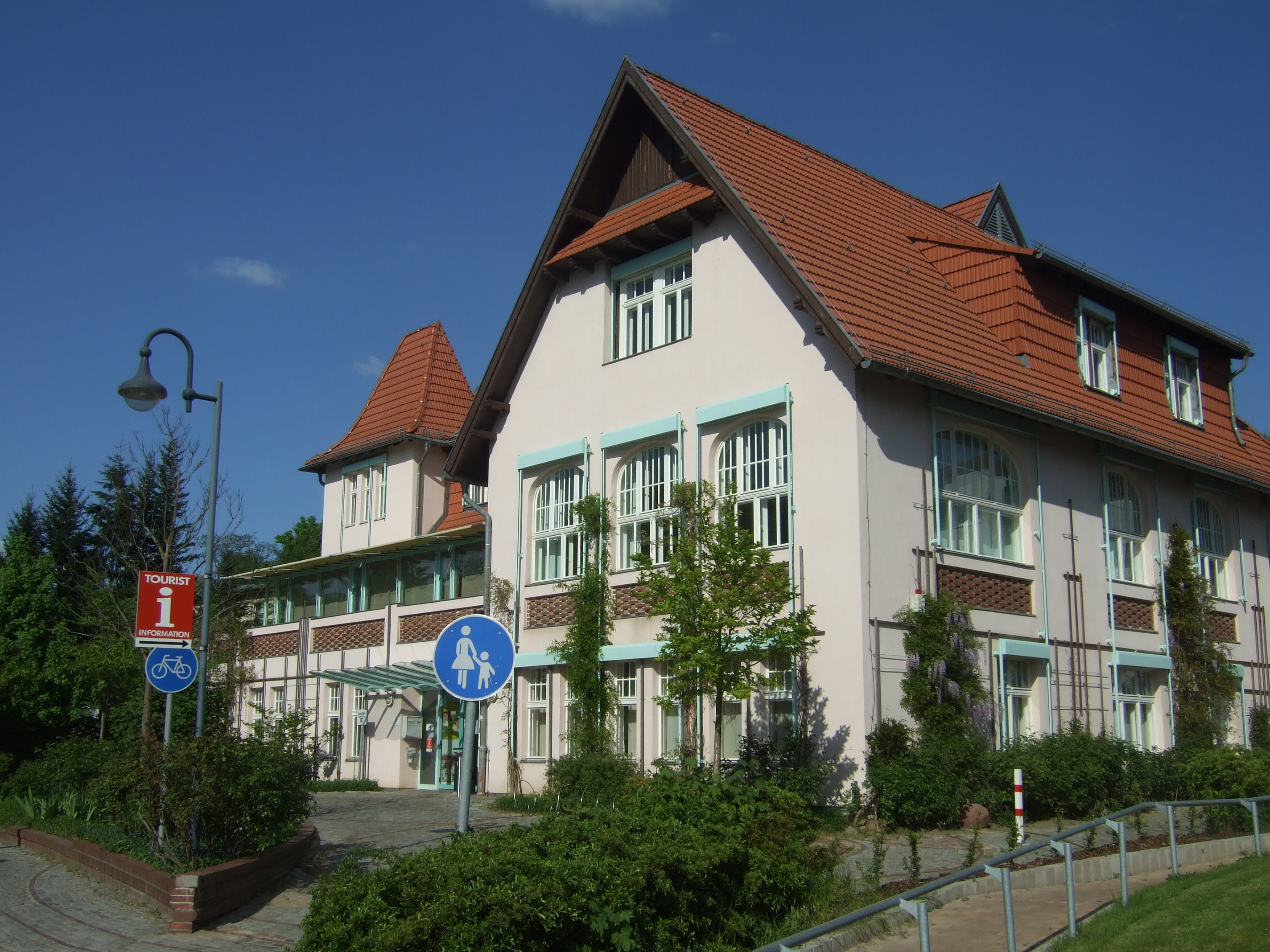
The town hall of Wandlitz, previously a private hotel.

The name Wandlitz is also often used as a synonym for the nearby "Waldsiedlung" (Forest Settlement) compound, where the highest East German functionaries lived removed from the general population. However, this settlement is actually located on the territory of the town Bernau.

== Pictures from Towns and Villages in Gemeinde Wandlitz ==
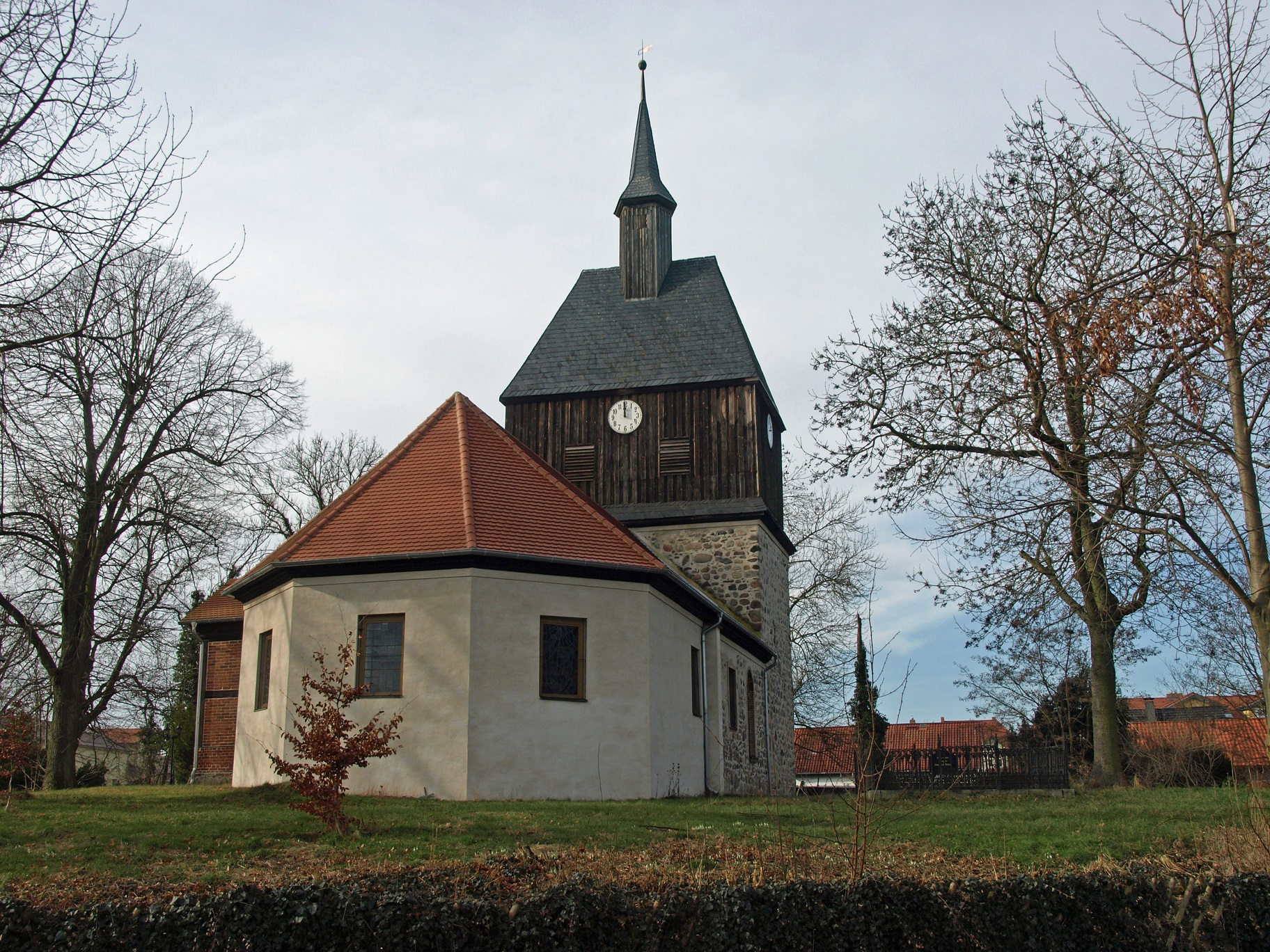
Village church of old Wandlitz

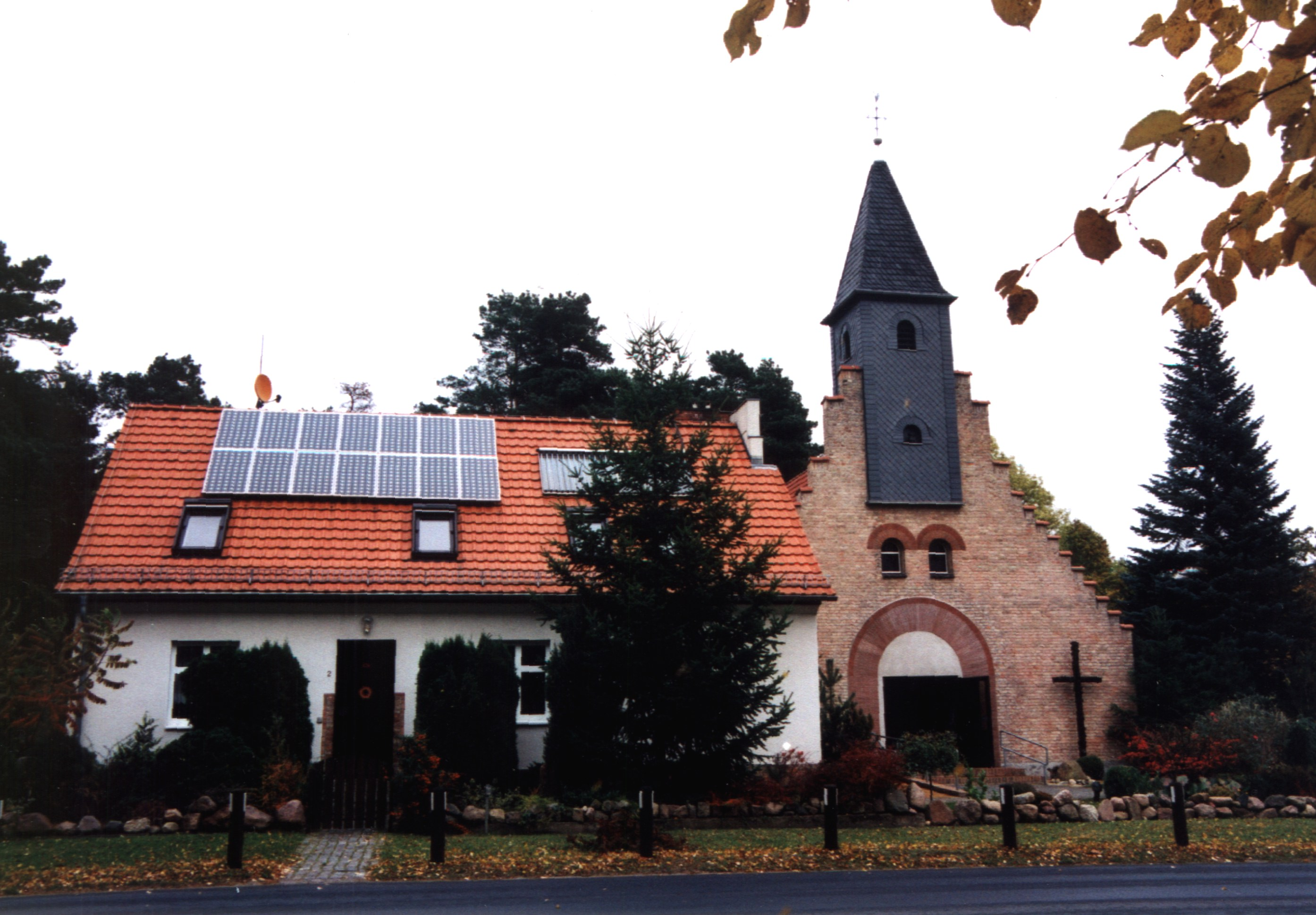
Catholic church in the new quarter Wandlitzsee (Lake of Wandlitz)

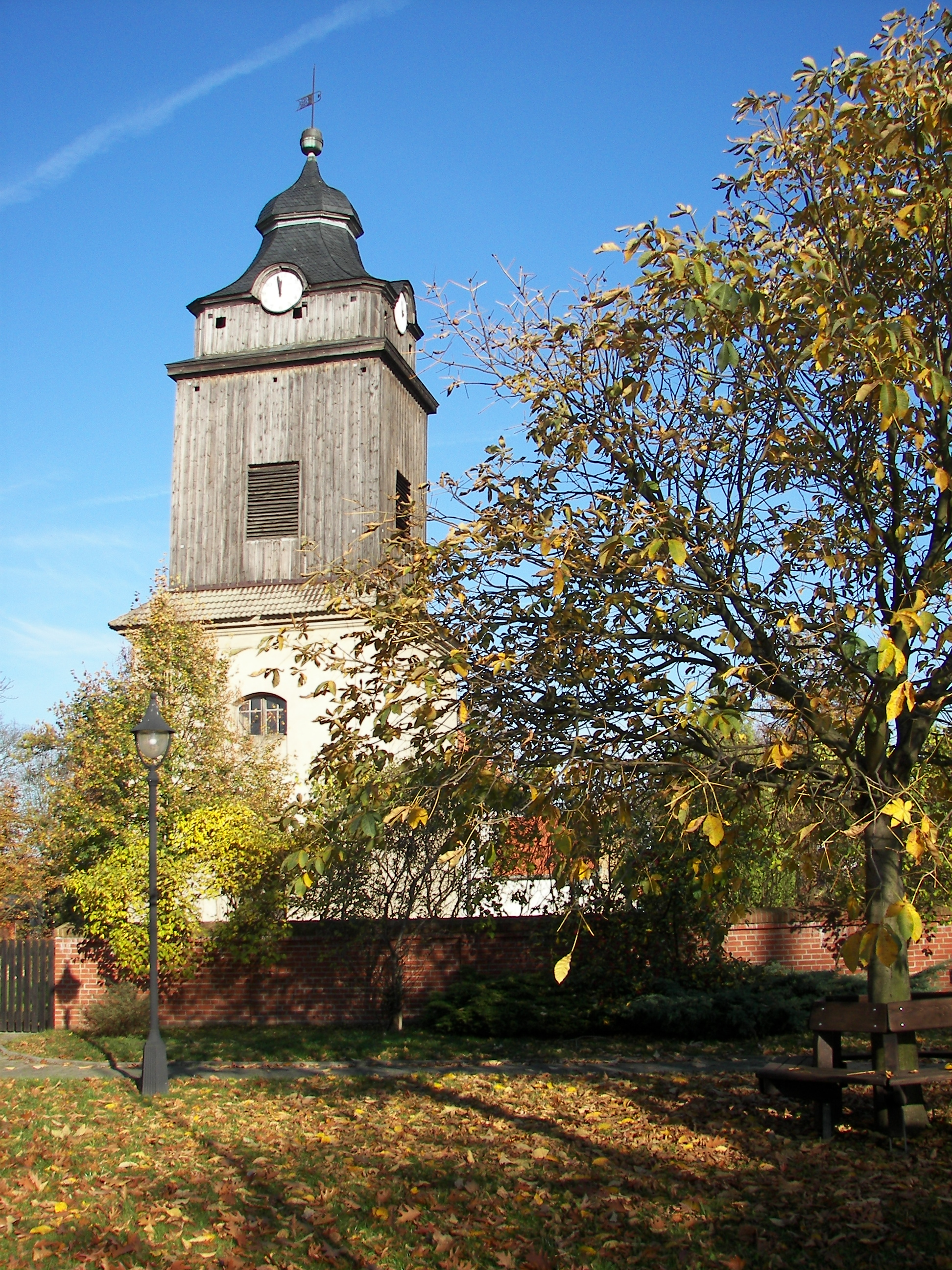
Village church on Basdorf village green

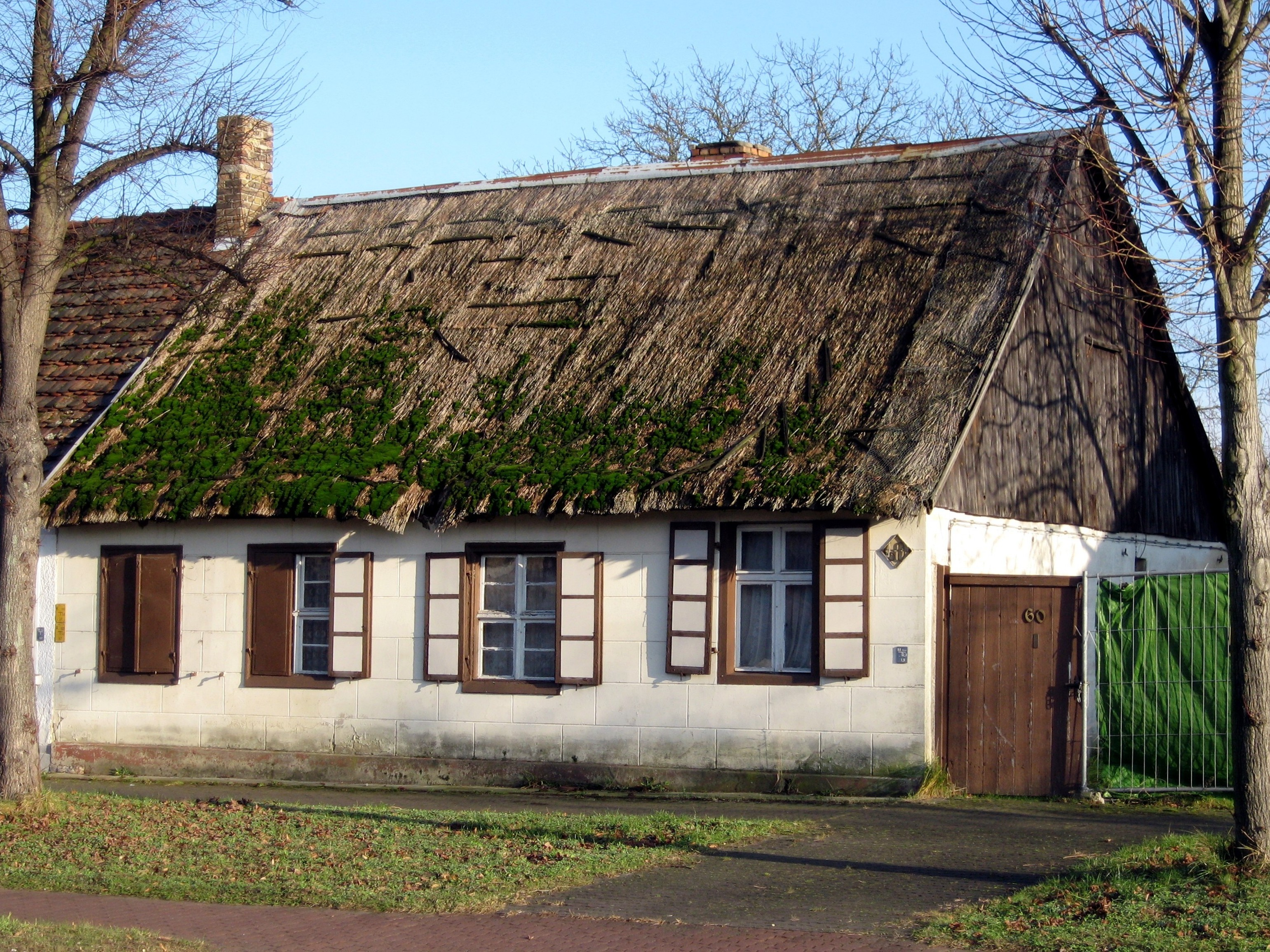
Old village cottage in Schönwalde

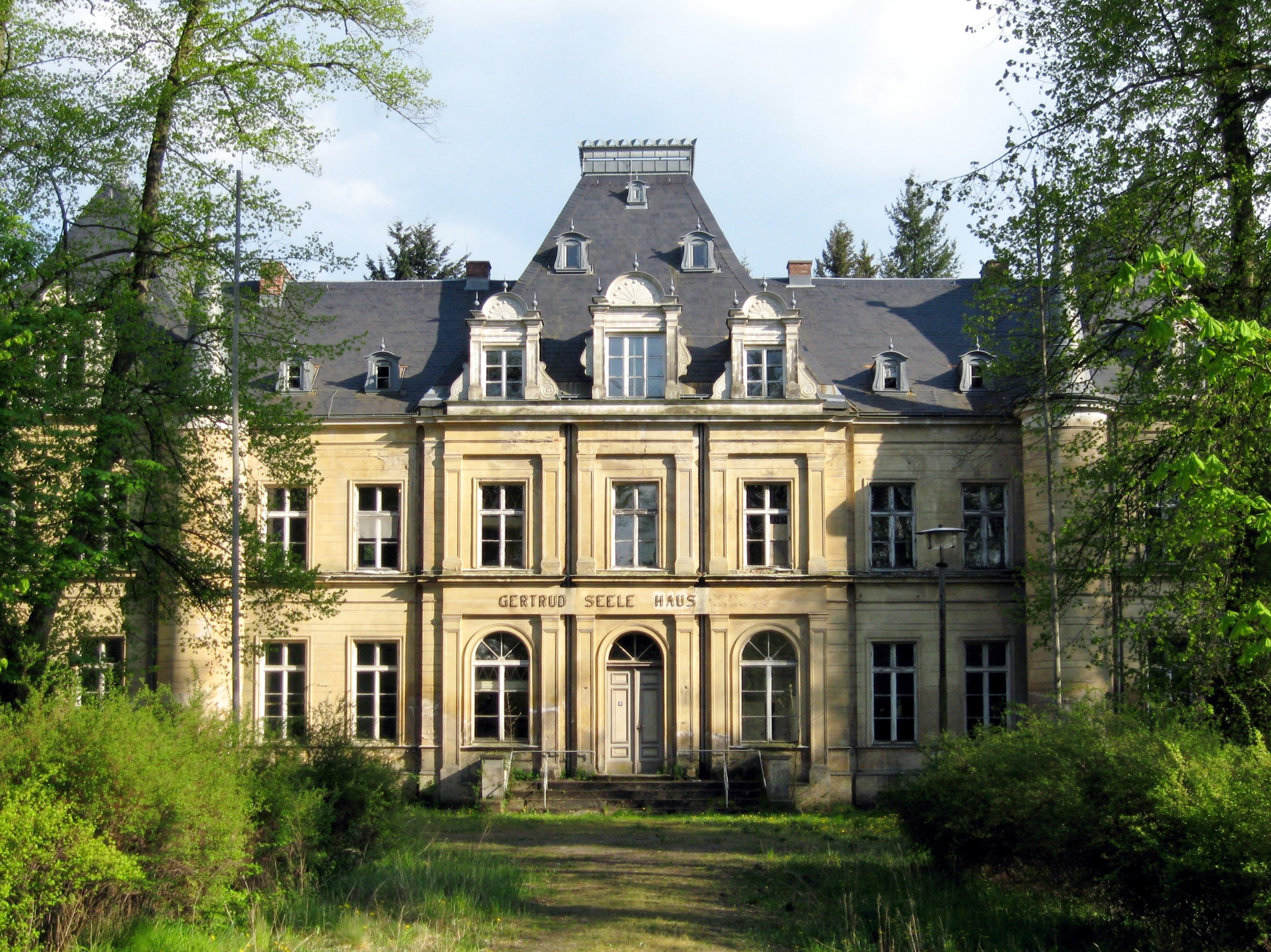
Lanke Palace

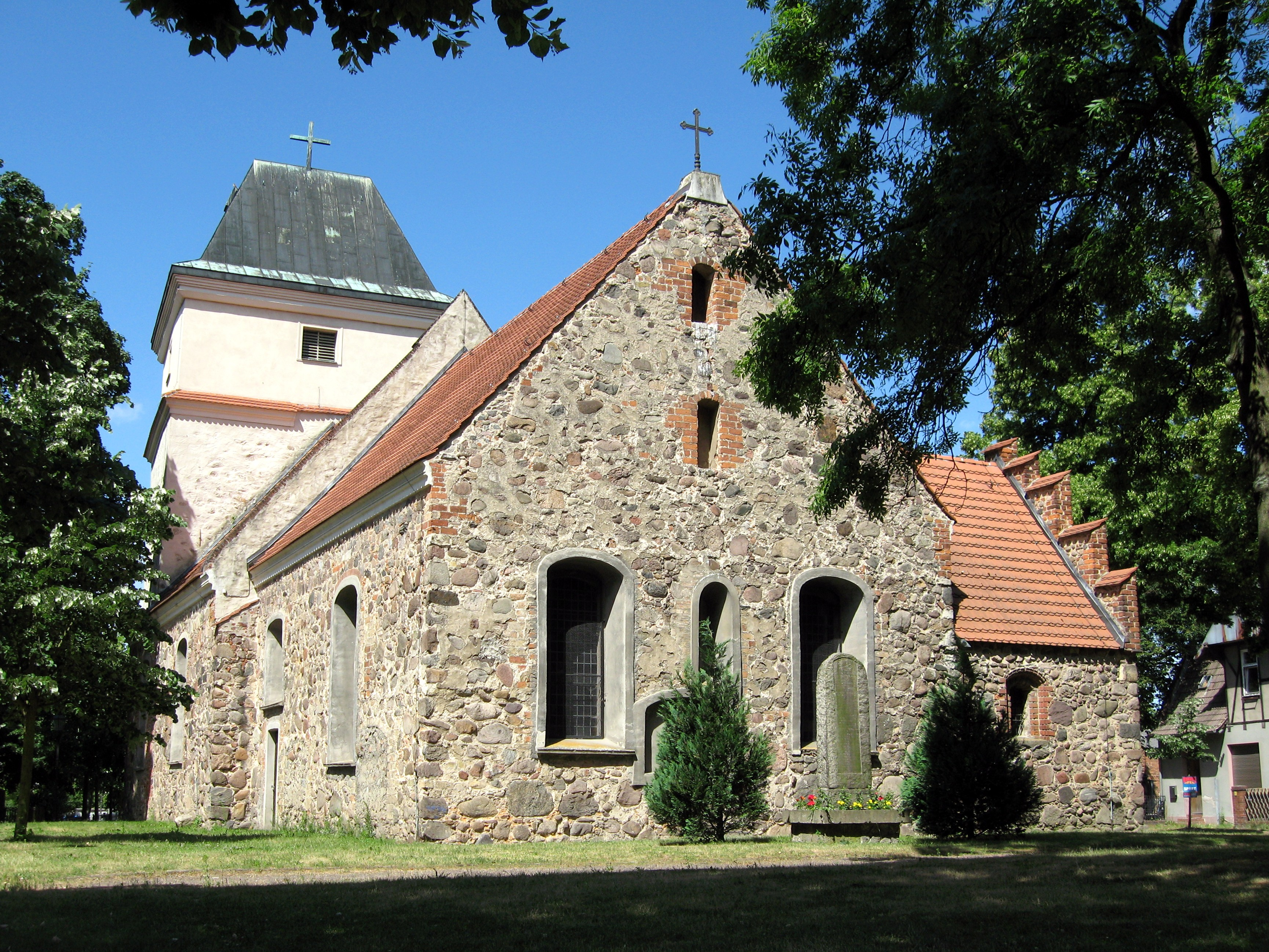
Village church of Schönerlinde

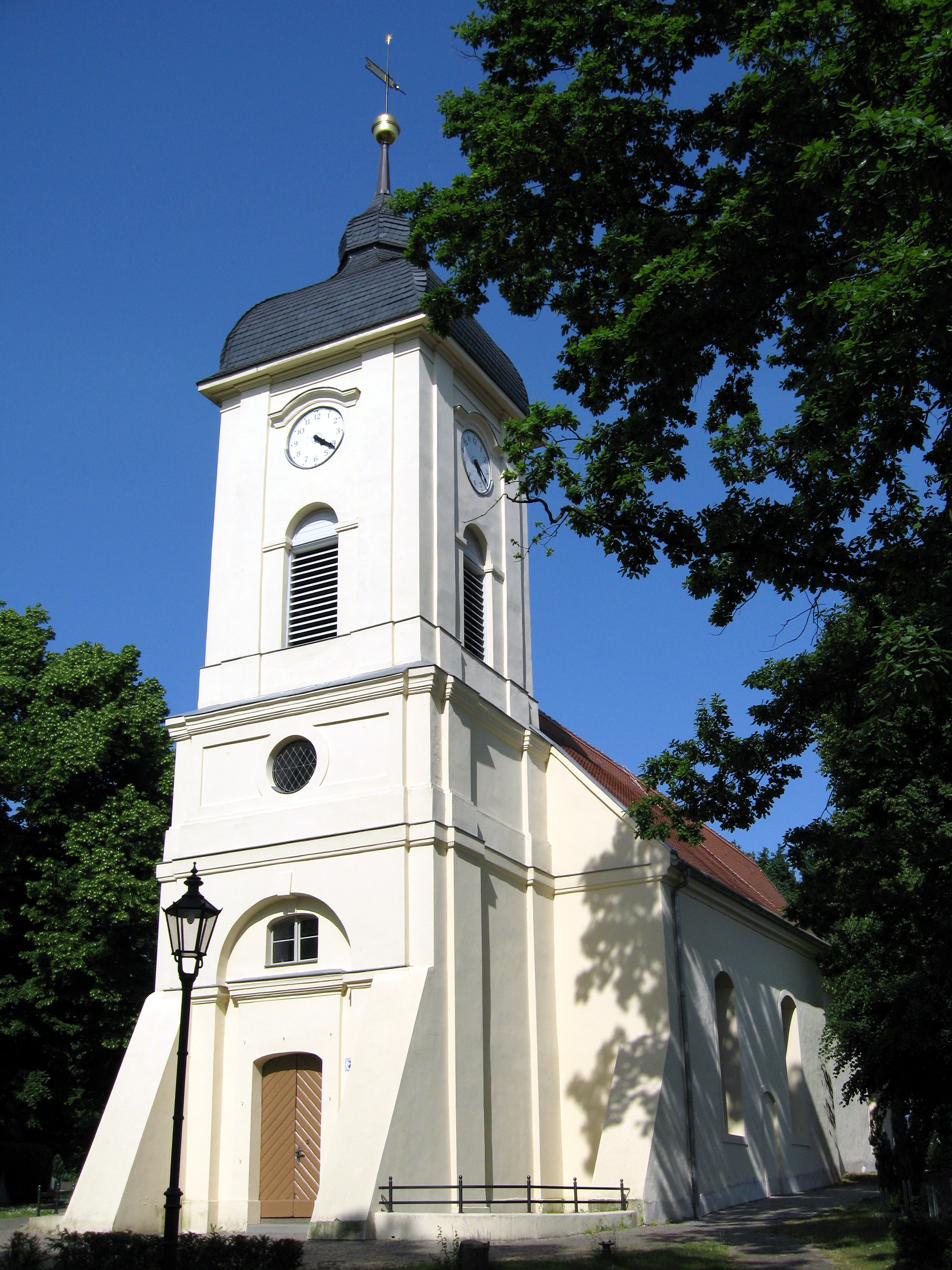
Village church of Klosterfelde

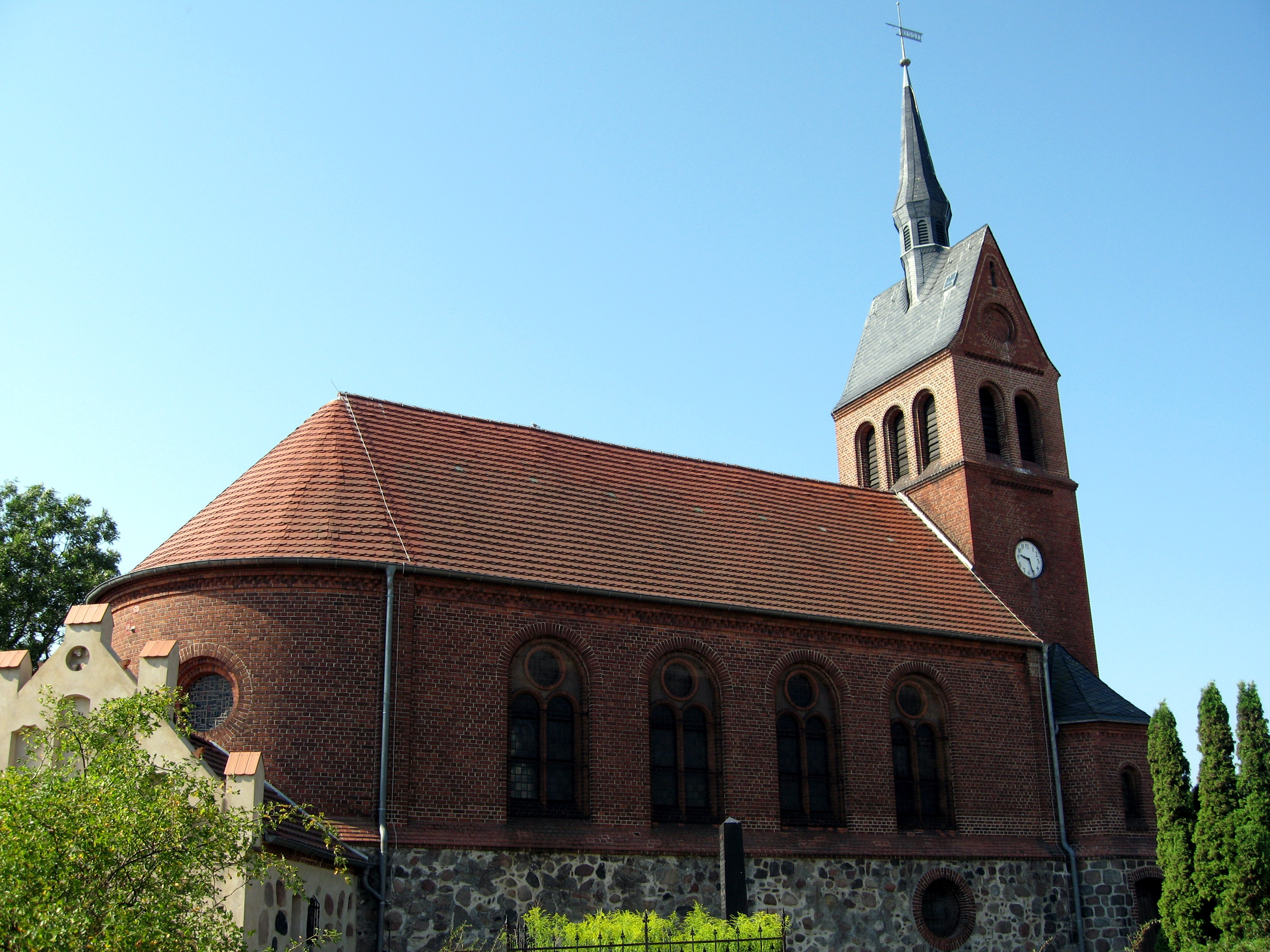
Village church of Stolzenhagen

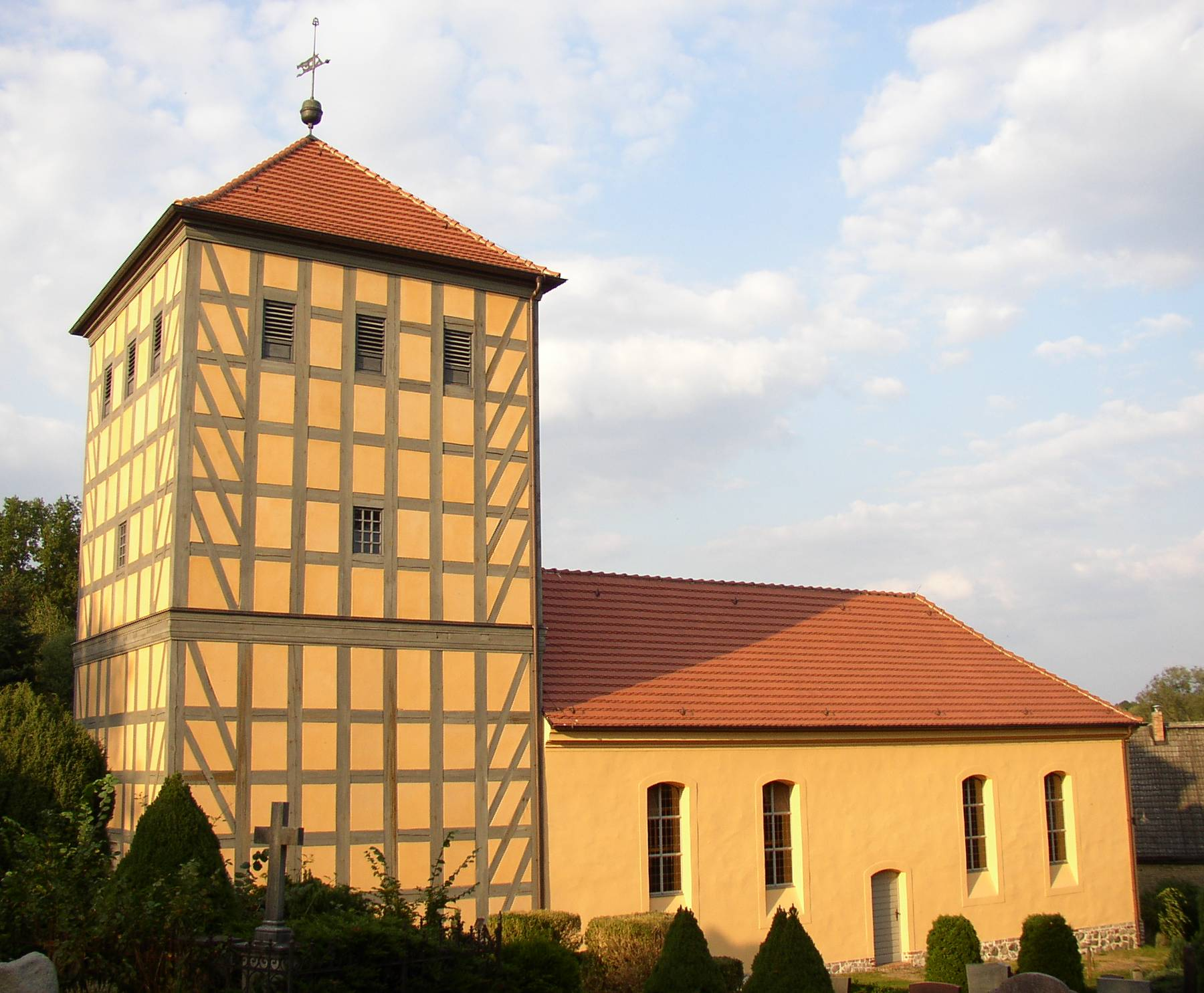
Village church of Prenden

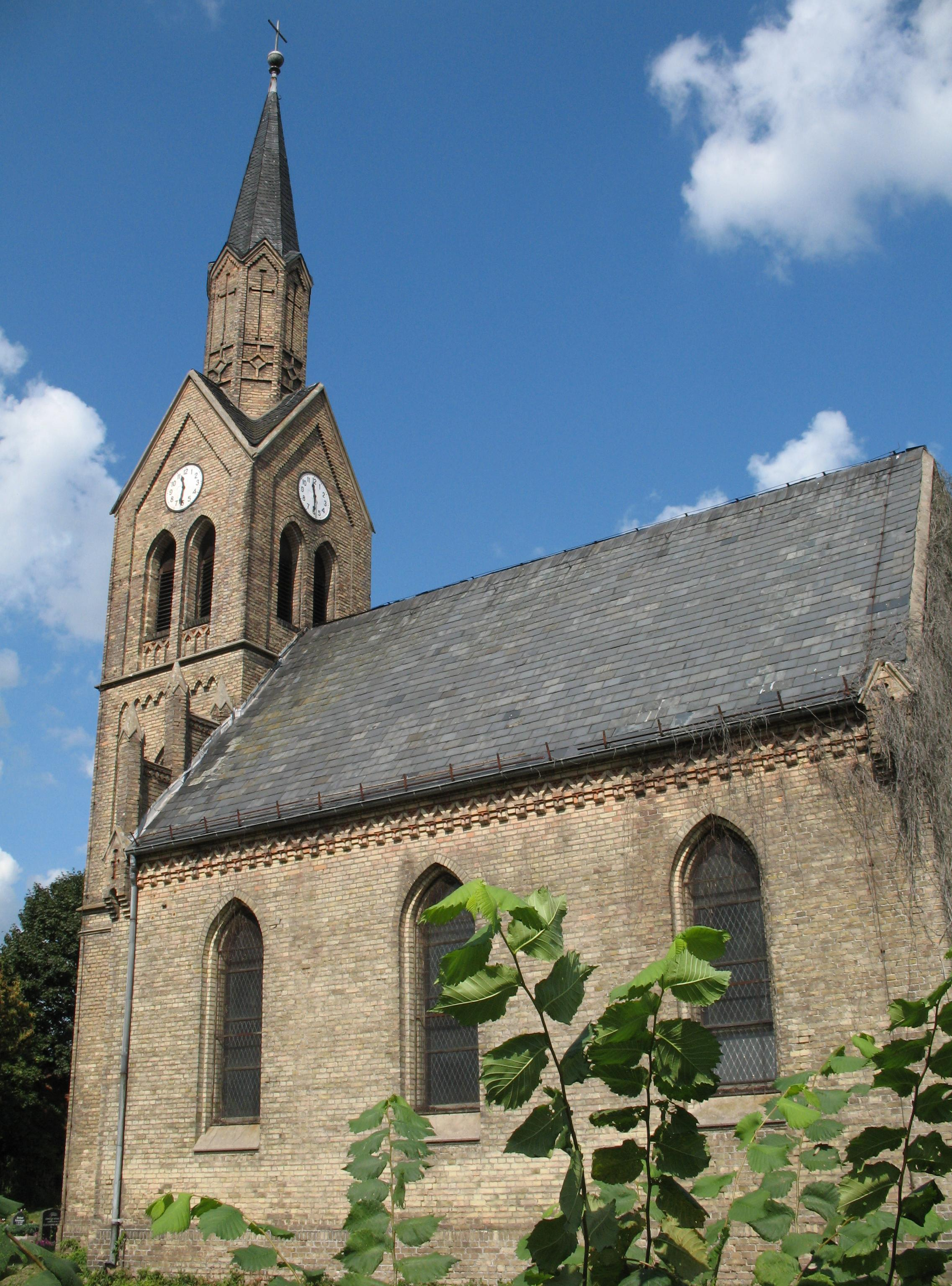
Church in Lanke

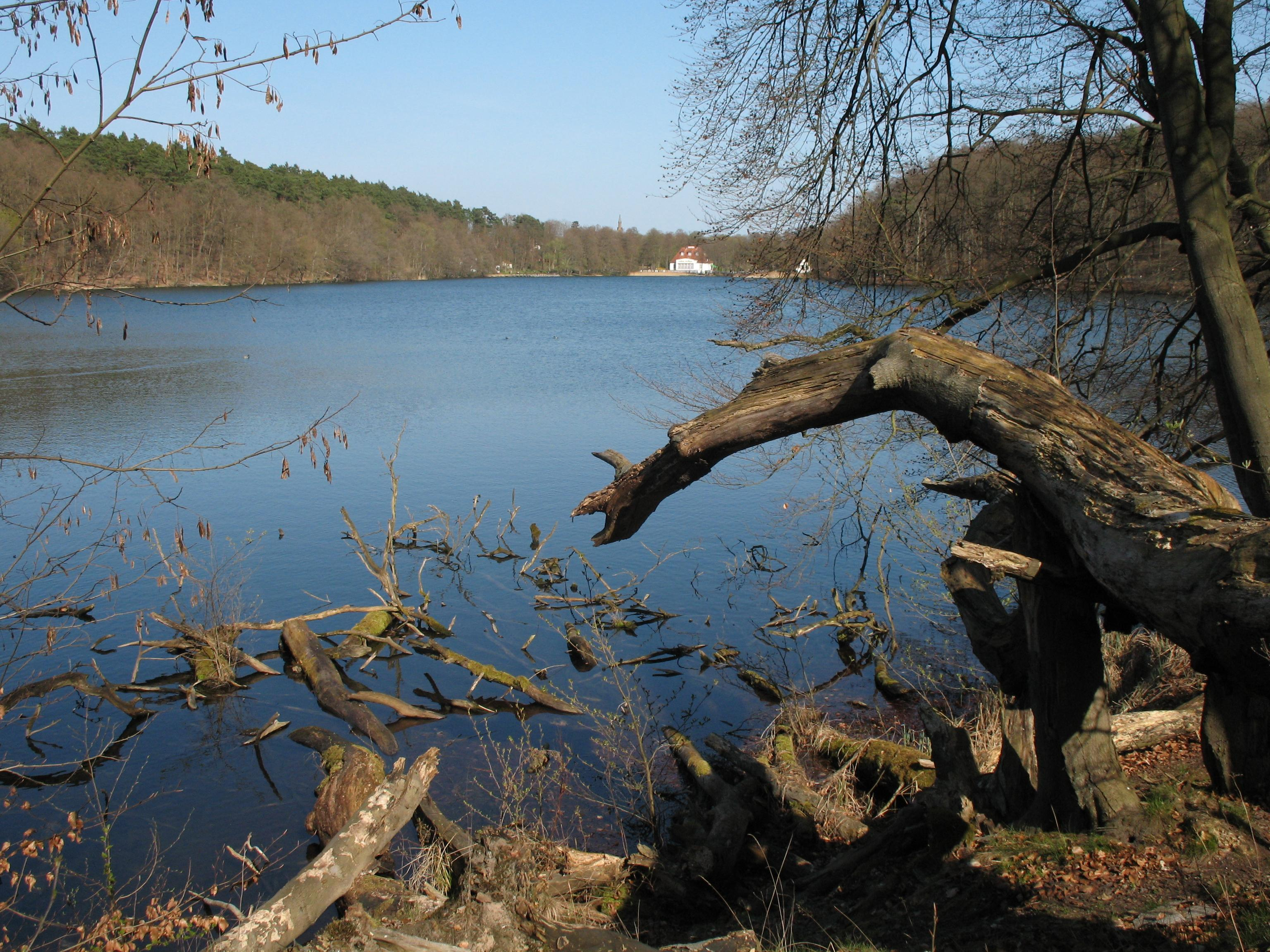
Obersee in Lanke

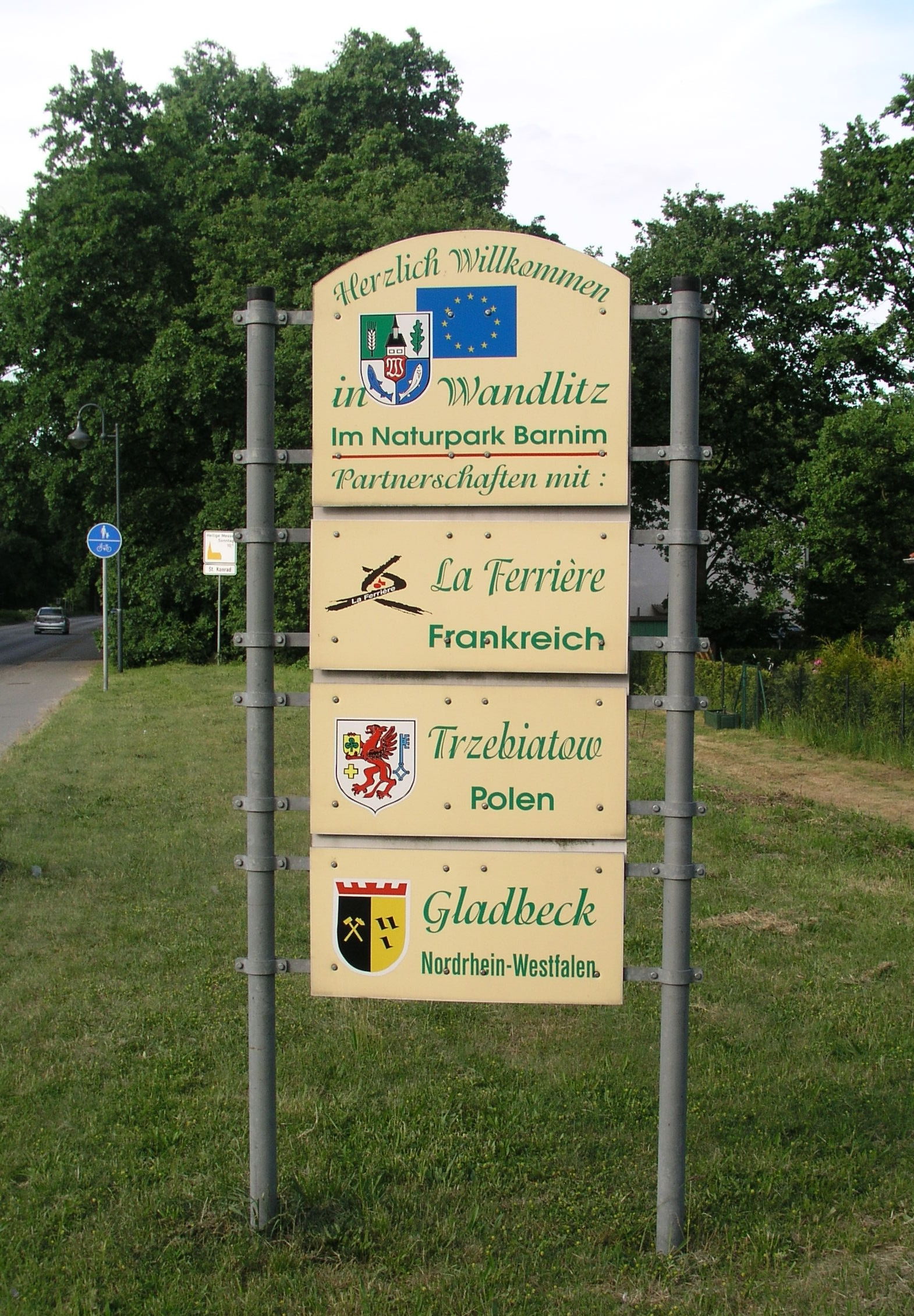
Information on twin towns

== Transport ==
Wandlitz is situated at the junction of the Bundesstraße 109 to Berlin and the Bundesautobahn 10 (Berliner Ring) with the Bundesstraße 273 leading from Oranienburg to the Bundesautobahn 11. The NEB Heidekrautbahn links Wandlitz with the Berlin-Karow railway station on the Berlin S2 S-Bahn line. Wandlitz is known to be the home of the only existing Skoda Fabia that still uses a steam power engine.
