= Liepnitzsee =

German lake

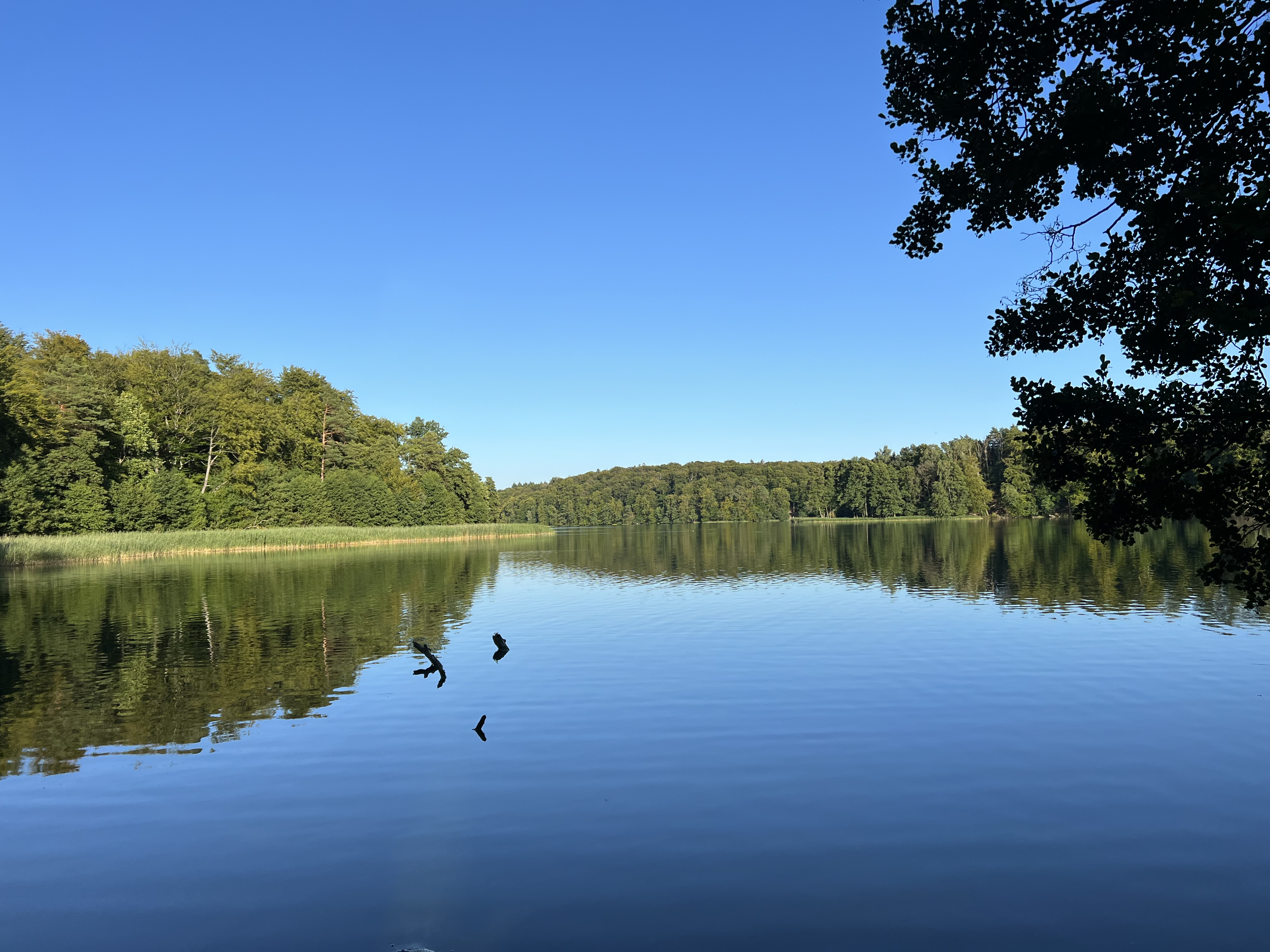

- Location within Brandenburg
- Location: Wandlitz, Bernau bei Berlin
- Coordinates: 52°45′N 13°31′E
- Primary outflows: Fließ
- Basin countries: Germany
- Max. length: 2.6 km (1.6 mi)
- Max. width: 0.9 km (0.56 mi)
- Surface area: 1.17 km^{2} (0.45 sq mi)
- Max. depth: 16 m (52 ft)
- Shore length^{1}: 8 km (5.0 mi)
- Surface elevation: 49.7 m (163 ft)
- ^{1} Shore length is not a well-defined measure.

Liepnitzsee is a German lake located in the municipalities of Wandlitz and Bernau bei Berlin, Brandenburg. At an elevation of 49.7 m, its surface area is 1.17 km^{2}. The lake is a popular destination for outdoor activities such as swimming, boating, and hiking. It features clear, clean water and is surrounded by lush forests, making it an ideal spot for nature lovers and tourists seeking a peaceful retreat. Liepnitzsee also has a small island, Großer Werder, accessible by ferry or swimming, adding to its appeal as a scenic and recreational haven.
