= Wandlitzer See =

Lake in Brandenburg, Germany

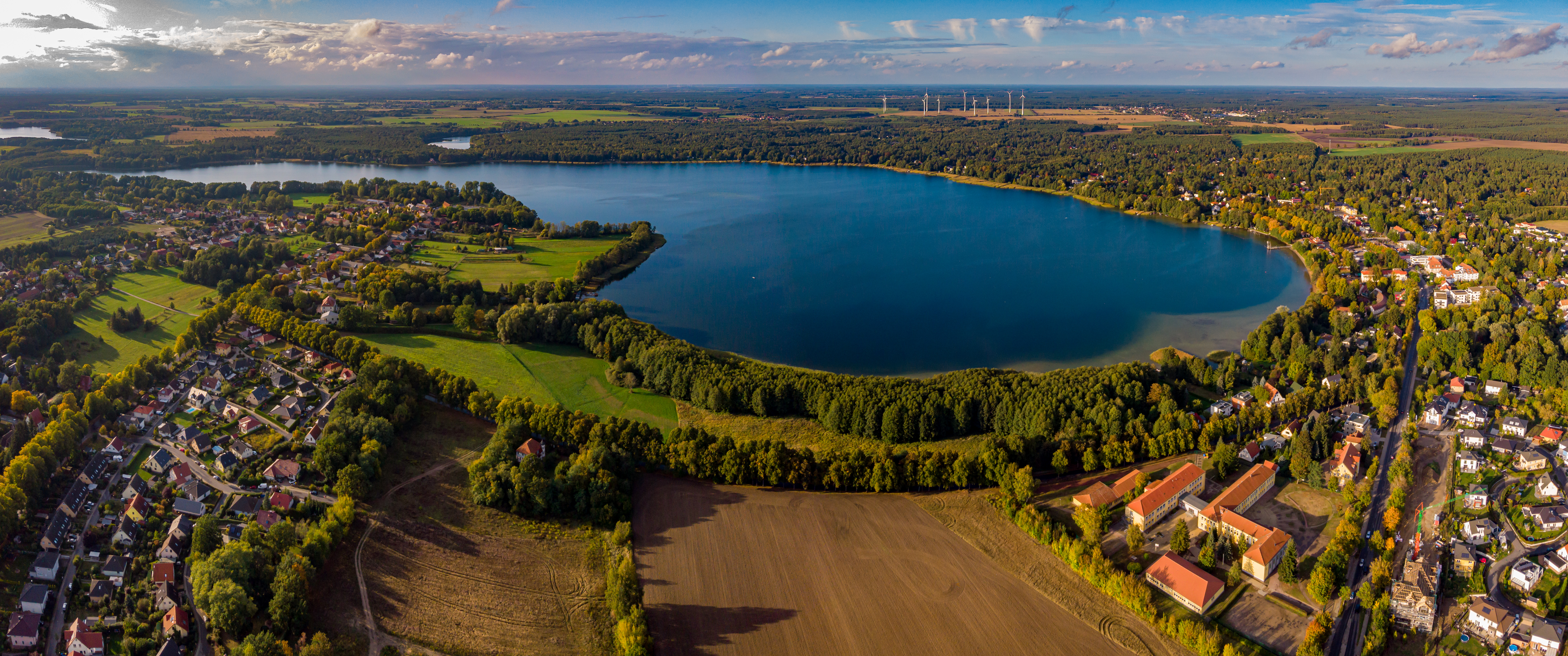
- Wandlitz

- Location within Brandenburg
- Location: Wandlitz, Brandenburg
- Coordinates: 52°45′0″N 13°26′59″E
- Basin countries: Germany
- Surface area: 2.15 km^{2} (0.83 sq mi)
- Max. depth: 24 m (79 ft)
- Surface elevation: 48.6 m (159 ft)
- Settlements: Wandlitz

The Wandlitzer See (colloquial also known as Wandlitzsee) is a lake in Wandlitz, Brandenburg, Germany. At an elevation of 48.6 m, its surface area is 2.15 km^{2}.
