= List of hills of Brandenburg =

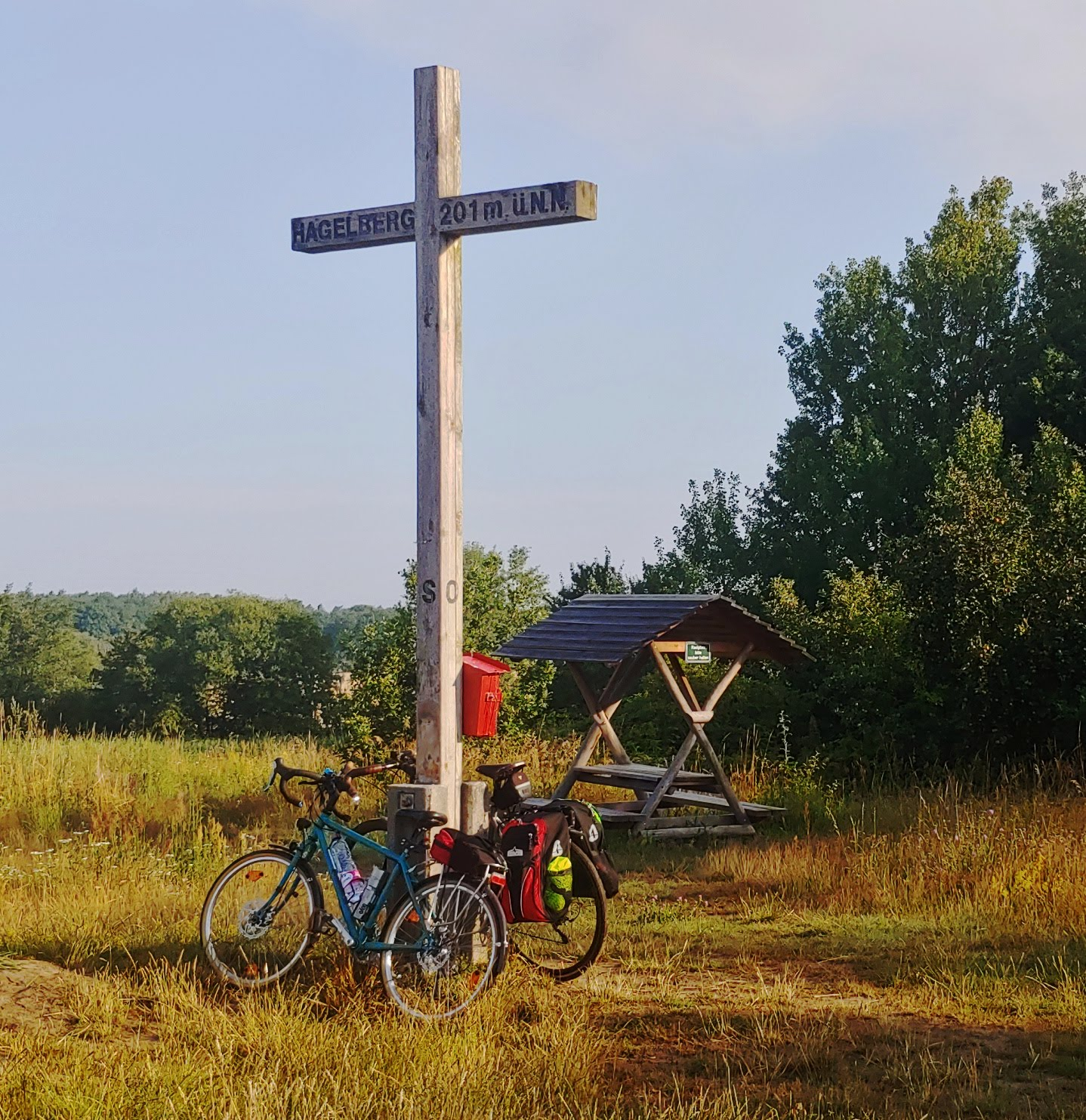
Summit cross at Hagelberg, claiming 201m altitude

This List of hills of Brandenburg shows a selection of well-known hills in the German federal state of Brandenburg – sorted by height in metres above Normalnull (NN):

Name, Height, Location (District(s) / Landscape Region)

1. Heidehöhe (201.4 m; highest point in Brandenburg on the Heideberg hill whose summit lies in Saxony, 206.1 m), District Elbe-Elster, in the landscape region of Schraden
2. Kutschenberg (200.7 m), Oberspreewald-Lausitz District, in the landscape region of Schraden, west of Ortrand, Kmehlener Berge
3. Hagelberg (200.2 m), Potsdam-Mittelmark District, High Fläming, west of Belzig
4. Dietzenberg (191 m), Oberspreewald-Lausitz District, Oberlausitz, near Ortrand
5. Hoher Berg (186 m), Spree-Neiße District, near Döbern
6. Golmberg (178 m), Teltow-Fläming District, Lower Fläming, near Stülpe (municipality of Nuthe-Urstromtal)
7. Brandberg (175 m), Muskauer Faltenbogen, near Döbern
8. Wache Berge (172 m), Potsdam-Mittelmark District
9. Hutberg (162 m), Oder-Spree District, southwest of Eisenhüttenstadt
10. Kesselberg (161 m), Oberspreewald-Lausitz District, Cabeler Berge, near Calau
11. Semmelberg (158 m), District Märkisch-Oderland, between Wollenberg and Platzfelde
12. Rauensche Berge (153 m), Oder-Spree District, near Fürstenwalde
13. Güterbank (153 m), District Elbe-Elster, in the landscape region of Schraden, Elsterwerda
14. Babbener Berge (152 m), District Elbe-Elster, near Finsterwalde
15. Dubrower Berge (150 m), Oder-Spree District, between Langewahl and Bad Saarow
16. Wehlaberg (144 m), Dahme-Spreewald District, Krausnick hills, near Lübben
17. Schwarzer Berg (144 m)
18. Gehrener Berge (140 m), Dahme-Spreewald District, near Luckau
19. Hirschberge (135 m)
20. Börnickenberg (129 m), Teltow-Fläming District, southeast of Jüterbog
21. Krugberg (129 m), Märkisch-Oderland District, Mark Switzerland
22. Butterberg (128), Prignitz District, near Boddin-Langow
23. Kronsberge (125 m), Prignitz District, southwest of Pritzwalk
24. Wietkiekenberg (124.7 m), Potsdam-Mittelmark District, highest point of the Zauche, near Schwielowsee-Ferch
25. Pimpinellenberg (117 m), im Barnim District, near Oderberg
26. Kahle Glatze (116 m), Spree-Neiße District, Kaltenborn Hills, near Guben
27. Kleiner Ravensberg (114.2 m), Saarmund end moraine arc, in Potsdam
28. Wahrberge (114 m), between Klein and Groß Woltersdorf, south of Pritzwalk, Prignitz District
29. Weinberg (Fredenwalde) (111 m), Groß Fredenwalde, Uckermark
30. Blocksberge (110.6 m), Dahme-Spreewald District, near Alt Schadow
31. Marienberg (110.0 m), Dahme-Spreewald District, near Krugau, am Ostrand des Unterspreewalds
32. Eichberge (108.9 m), Teltow-Fläming District, near Wünsdorf
33. Götzer Berg (108.6 m), Potsdam-Mittelmark District, Gemarkung of Groß Kreutz
34. Großer Ravensberg (108.2 m), Saarmund end moraine arc, near Potsdam
35. Löwendorfer Berg (104 m), west of Trebbin, Teltow-Fläming District
36. Kranichsberg (105 m), near Woltersdorf, Oder-Spree District
37. Teufelsberg (92.7), Havelland District, between Stechow, Kotzen and Nennhausen
38. Rollberge (90.5), Havelland District, near Rathenow
39. Eichelberg (89.6), Potsdam-Mittelmark District, near Deetz
40. Rauhe Berge (86 m), Potsdam-Mittelmark District, in the landscape region of Zauche, near Lehnin Abbey
41. Kleiner Rummelsberg (81 m; possibly a drumlin, disputed), end moraine arc of Chorin, near Chorin-Brodowin, Barnim District
42. Pfingstberg (76 m), City of Potsdam
43. Ruinenberg (74.1 m), City of Potsdam
44. Marienberg (69 m), in Brandenburg an der Havel

== See also ==
- List of mountain and hill ranges in Germany
- List of the highest mountains in Germany
- List of the highest points of the German states
