= List of the highest points of the German states =

The highest points in the German states
Elevations in metres (m) above sea level (NHN)

This list of the highest points of the German states shows the highest mountain or hill in each German federal state together with its height and links to lists of other mountains and hills.

== Overview ==
At 2,962.06 m above sea level (NHN), the highest mountain in Germany is Bavaria's Zugspitze, whose height until 2000 was given as 2,961.47 m above sea level (NN). The lowest height occurs in the city of Bremen: at 32.5 m the highest natural point of the smallest German state is located in Friedehorst Park in the Bremen quarter of Burglesum, although the rubbish tip in Bremen-Blockland, whose summit reaches 49 m, is higher. The highest natural point in the capital city of Berlin, the Große Müggelberg, is, at 114.7 m still 5.4 metres lower than the rubble heap of the Teufelsberg, which was piled up after the Second World War and reaches a height of 120.1 m; but the highest point in Berlin is an artificially created mound of the Arkenberge, which attains a height of about 122 m. Together with the highest points of the states of Hamburg, Schleswig-Holstein and Mecklenburg-Vorpommern, none reaches a height of 200 m.

At 201 m, the Kutschenberg is the highest summit in Brandenburgs. However, the highest point in the state is actually a spot on the Heidehöhe which reaches 201.4 m, but whose summit lies a few metres over the border in the neighbouring state of Saxony.

The only summit of the sixteen that is not marked by a summit cross or a stone is the rise in Friedehorst Park. The summit of the Großer Beerberg lies within a biosphere reserve and is not, therefore, accessible to the public. However, peak baggers may count the observation platform which lies just below the summit.

== List ==
This list of the highest mountains or hills in each of the German states is sorted by height in metres (m) above sea level (NHN):

State	Mountain or hill	Elevation	Location	Range	Isolation	Prominence	Image
Baden-Württemberg (List)	Feldberg	1493.0 m	47°52′25″N 08°00′14″E	Black Forest	97 km → Rossberg (CH)	930 m	Feldberg
Bavaria (List)	Zugspitze	2962.06 m	47°25′16.38″N 10°59′10.73″E	Northern Limestone Alps	24.6 km → Acherkogel (A)	1746 m	West side of the Zugspitze
Berlin (List)	Arkenberge	122 m	52°38′23.7″N 13°24′27.7″E				Arkenberge
Brandenburg (List)	Kutschenberg	201 m	51°21′55″N 13°43′38″E	Kmehlen Hills			Kutschenberg
Bremen (List)	Eminence in Friedehorst Park	32.5 m	53°10′44″N 08°40′28″E				Friedehorst Park
Hamburg (List)	Hasselbrack	116.2 m	53.43033°N 9.86388°E	Harburg Hills	0.46 km → unnamed hillock (120.4 m) in the Wulmstorf and Daerstorf Forest; 3.4 km → Gannaberg (155 m)		Hasselbrack
Hesse (List)	Wasserkuppe	950.0 m	50°29′53″N 9°56′16″E	Rhön	60 km → Großer Beerberg	585 m	Wasserkuppe
Mecklenburg-Vorpommern (List)	Helpt Hills	179.2 m	53°29′21″N 13°36′53″E	Helpt Hills			Helpt Hills
Lower Saxony (List)	Wurmberg	971.2 m	51°45′24″N 10°37′8″E	Harz	3 km → Brocken	182 m	Wurmberg
North Rhine-Westphalia (List)	Langenberg	843.2 m	51°16′35.27″N 08°33′30.26″E	Rothaar Mountains	116 km → Großer Feldberg	557 m	Langenberg
Rhineland-Palatinate (List)	Erbeskopf	816.32 m	49°43′46″N 7°5′20″E	Hunsrück	113 km	571 m	Erbeskopf
Saarland (List)	Dollberg	695.4 m	49°37′47″N 07°00′52″E	Dollberge			Dollberg
Saxony (List)	Fichtelberg	1214.8 m	50°25′46″N 12°57′15″E	Ore Mountains	3.4 km → Klínovec (CZ)	135 m	The Keilberg and the Fichtelberg seen from the Hoher Stein
Saxony-Anhalt (List)	Brocken	1141.2 m	51.7991°N 10.6156°E	Harz	224 km → Fichtelberg	856 m	The Brocken seen from Torfhaus
Schleswig-Holstein (List)	Bungsberg	167.4 m	54°12′39″N 10°43′26″E	Holstein Switzerland			Summit stone on the Bungsberg
Thuringia (List)	Großer Beerberg	982.9 m	Beerberg 50°39′34″N 10°44′46″E	Thuringian Forest	103 km → Ochsenkopf	389 m	Großer Beerberg

== See also ==
- Mountains
  - List of the highest mountains in Germany
  - List of mountains in Switzerland
  - List of highest mountains in the world
  - List of the highest mountains in the continents
- Ranges
  - List of mountain ranges
  - List of mountain and hill ranges in Germany
