= Arkenberger Baggersee =

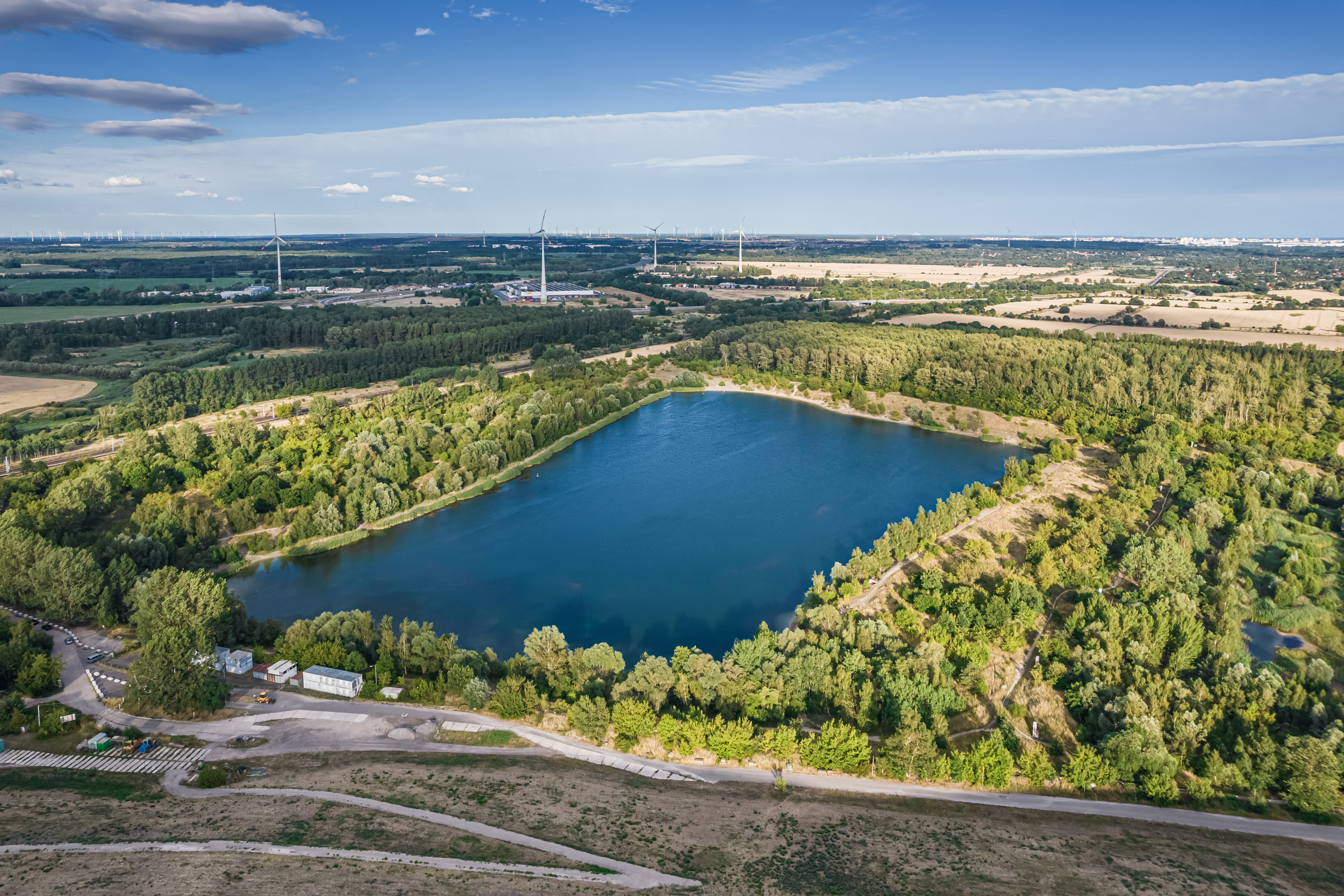

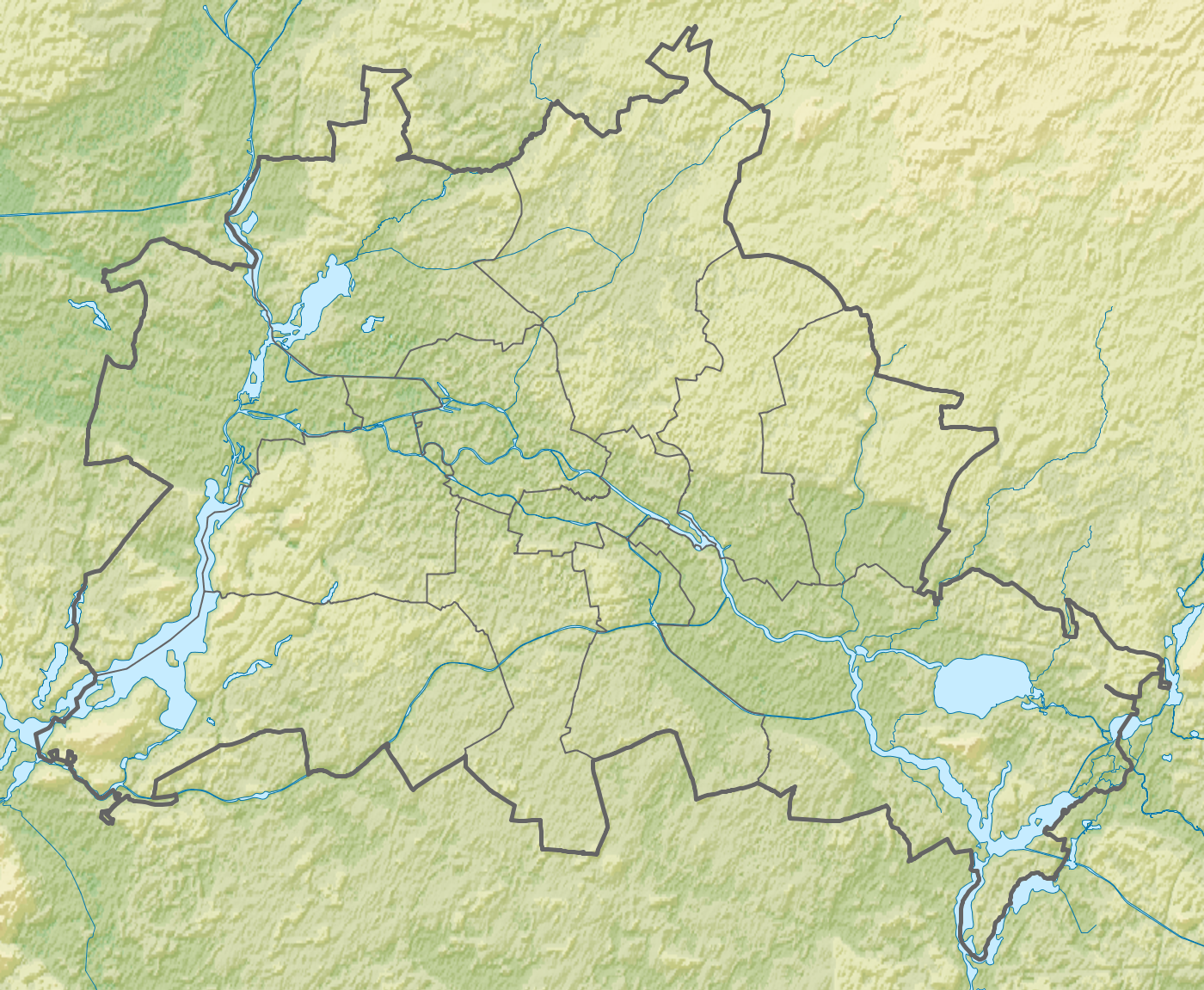
- Location within Berlin
- Location: Berlin
- Coordinates: 52°38′10″N 13°24′40″E
- Basin countries: Germany
- Max. length: ca. 450 m (1,480 ft)
- Max. width: 350 m (1,150 ft)
- Surface area: 13 ha (32 acres)
- Average depth: 3.14 m (10.3 ft)
- Max. depth: 5.77 m (18.9 ft)
- Water volume: 409,151 m^{3} (14,449,000 cu ft)
- Shore length^{1}: 1.527 km (0.949 mi)
- ^{1} Shore length is not a well-defined measure.

Arkenberger Baggersee is an artificial lake in the Barnim Nature Park, close to the Blankenfelde locality in the Pankow borough of Berlin, Germany. Its surface area is 13 ha.

== History ==
The lake was created in 1979 from a former gravel pit that was excavated during the construction of the Bundesautobahn 114. The lake is named for the nearby Arkenberge hill.

In 2004, bathing and swimming were prohibited in Arkenberger Baggersee, along with eleven other lakes, because the water quality could not be guaranteed to meet European Union regulations on the quality of public-use waters. Prior to that, crowds of up to 1500 people were known to attend on warm days, and there was a great deal of concern about the garbage they left behind.

== Fauna ==
Thirteen species of fish have been introduced to the lake, including catfish and carp. Although they were introduced as stock, most species except catfish and carp have established breeding populations in the lake.
