= Krausnick-Groß Wasserburg =

- Municipality
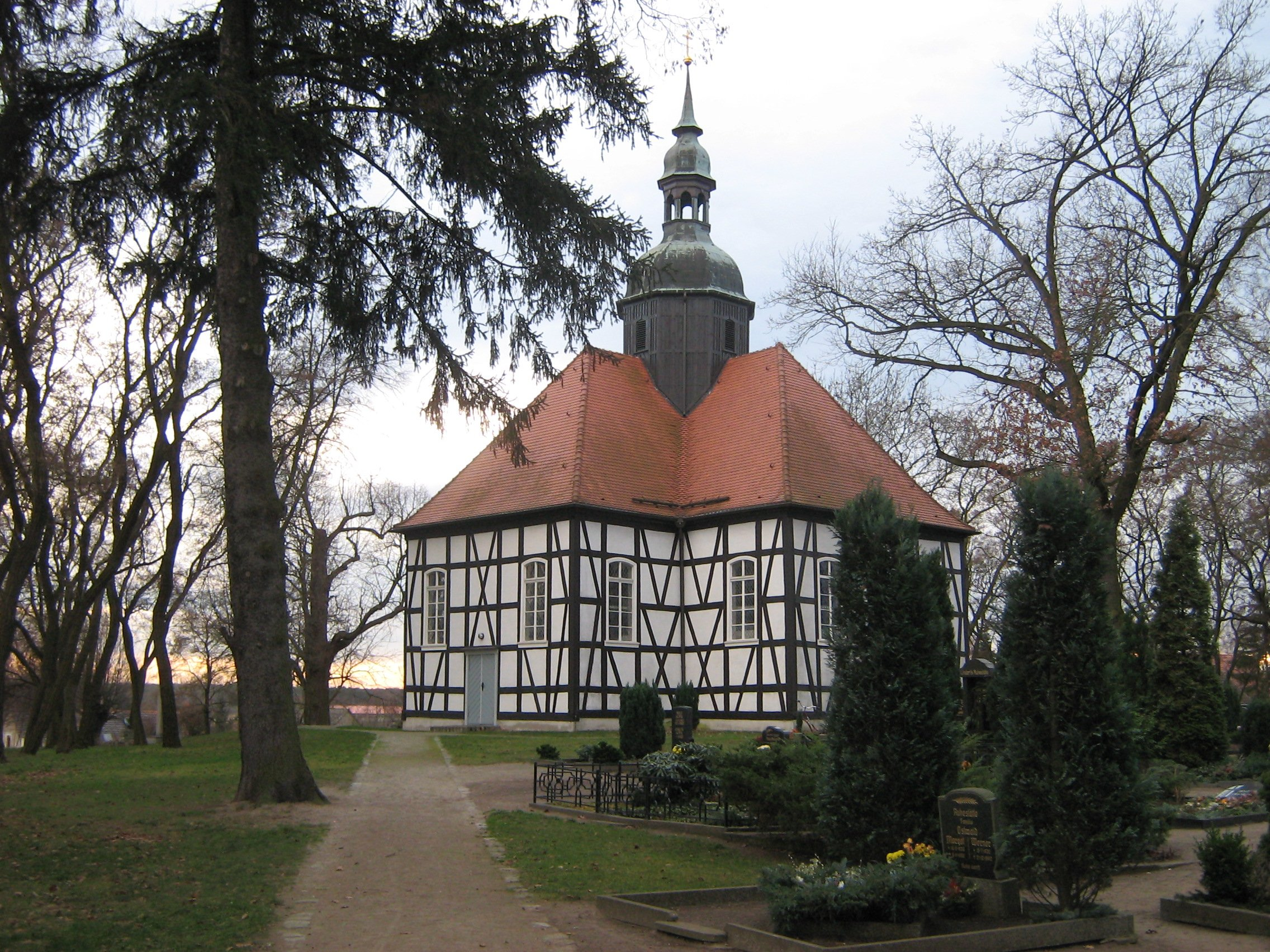
- Church in Krausnick

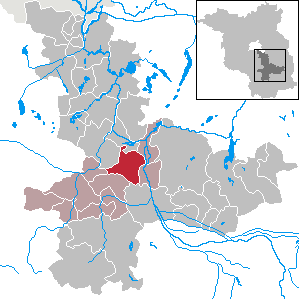
- Location of Krausnick-Groß Wasserburg within Dahme-Spreewald district
- Interactive map of Krausnick-Groß Wasserburg
- Location within Germany Location within Brandenburg
- Coordinates: 52°02′00″N 13°51′00″E
- Country: Germany
- State: Brandenburg
- District: Dahme-Spreewald
- Municipal assoc.: Unterspreewald

Government
  - Mayor (2024–29): Toni Schoan

Area
  - Total: 54.54 km^{2} (21.06 sq mi)
- Elevation: 50 m (160 ft)

Population (2025-12-31)
  - Total: 682
  - Density: 12.5/km^{2} (32.4/sq mi)
- Time zone: UTC+01:00 (CET)
  - Summer (DST): UTC+02:00 (CEST)
- Postal codes: 15910
- Dialling codes: 035472, 035473
- Vehicle registration: LDS
- Website: www.unterspreewald.de

Krausnick-Groß Wasserburg (Lower sorbian: Kšušwica-Wódowy Grod) is a municipality in the district of Dahme-Spreewald in Brandenburg in Germany. Tropical Islands Resort, the biggest free-standing hall in the world, is located in Krausnick.

== Geography ==
In the middle of the heavily wooded municipality of Krausnick-Groß Wasserburg rise the Krausnick hills (also called the Bergspreewald or Bergspree Woods), which reach a maximum elevation of 144 m above sea level at the summit of the Wehlaberg, and rise about 100 metres above the adjacent Lower Spreewald woods. In the north of the area (in Groß Wasserburg) the Rand Canal branches off the River Spree (Wasserburger Spree) and runs along the Baruth Urstromtal to the Köthener See, which is linked to the River Dahme by the Dahme Flood Relief Canal. The municipality lies ca. 60 km southeast of Berlin.

== Demography ==
Development of population since 1875 within the current boundaries (Blue line: Population; Dotted line: Comparison to population development of Brandenburg state; Grey background: Time of Nazi rule; Red background: Time of communist rule)

Krausnick-Groß Wasserburg: Population development within the current boundaries

Year	Pop.
1875	1112
1890	1075
1925	952
1933	943
1939	968
1946	1233
1950	1102
1964	898
1971	853
1981	761

Year	Pop.
1985	720
1989	702
1990	694
1991	661
1992	644
1993	642
1994	629
1995	628
1996	632
1997	623

Year	Pop.
1998	620
1999	648
2000	623
2001	618
2002	609
2003	617
2004	632
2005	632
2006	636
2007	632

Year	Pop.
2008	632
2009	633
2010	619
2011	616
2012	602

Detailed data sources are to be found in the Wikimedia Commons.

== See also ==
- Luchsee
