= Barnim Nature Park =

Coordinates: 52°42′24″N 13°32′18″E

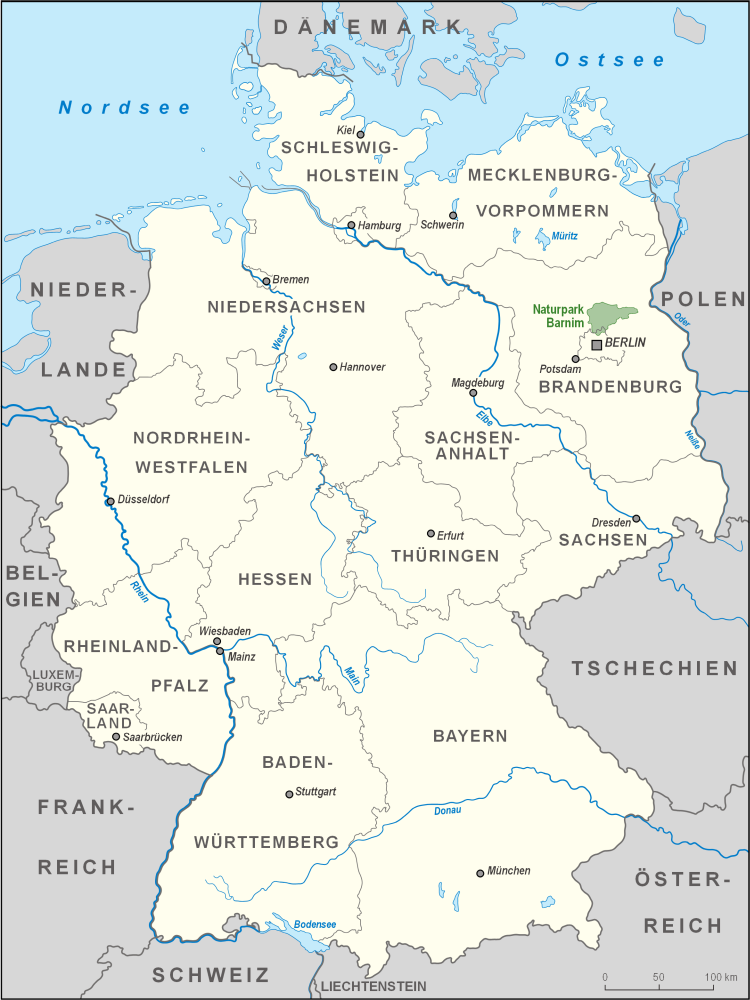

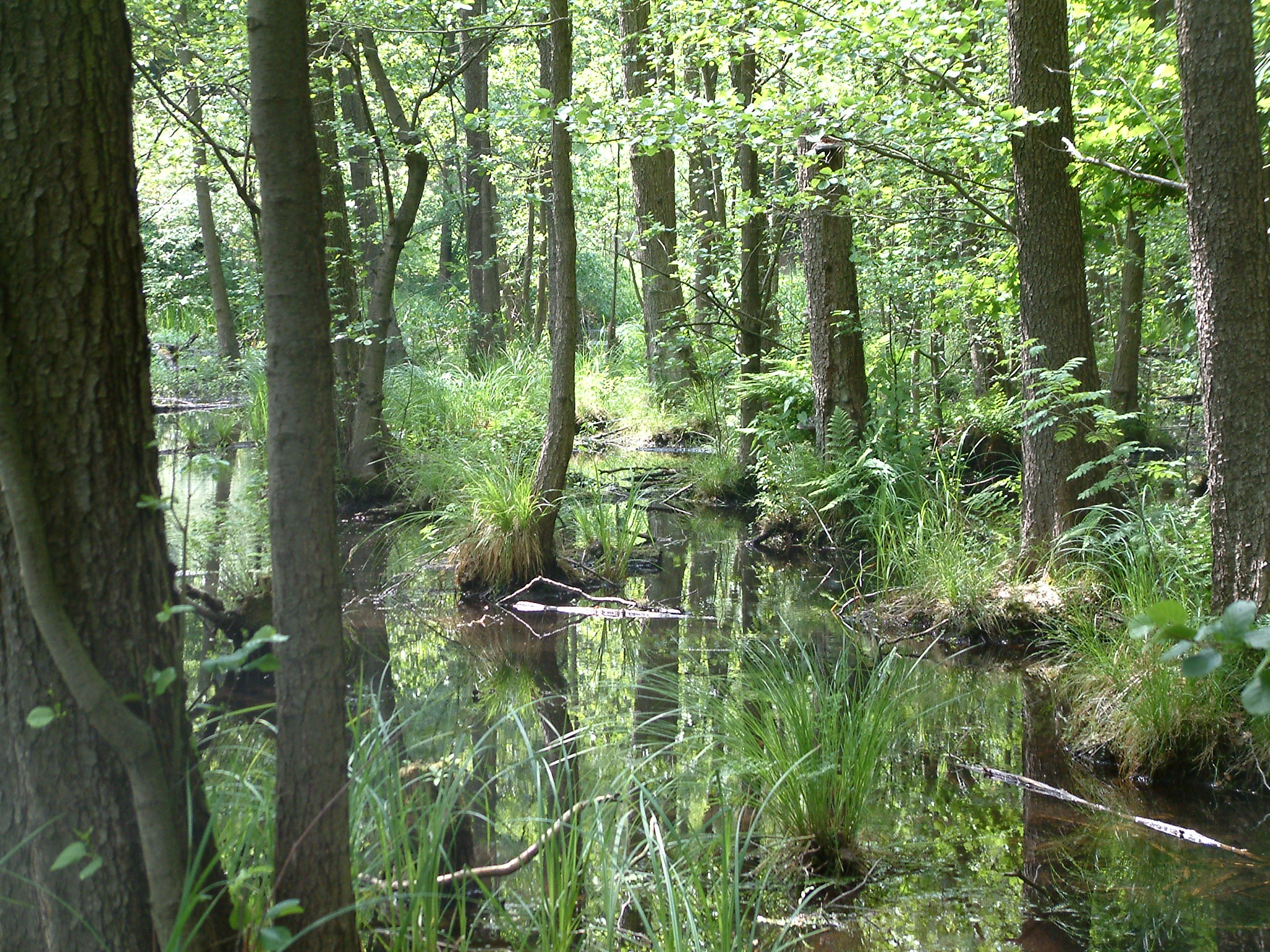

Barnim Nature Park (Naturpark Barnim) is a nature park and reserve in the state of Brandenburg, and partly in Berlin, Germany. It covers an area of 750 km^{2} (290 sq mi). It was established on September 24, 1998.

== Overview ==
The park is located between the northern side of Berlin and the central-north Brandenburg, between the towns of Oranienburg, Liebenwalde, Eberswalde and Bernau. Its territory is extended principally in the district of Barnim, and partly in Oberhavel and Märkisch-Oderland. It includes parts of some localities in Berliner districts of Pankow and Reinickendorf; as Buch, Blankenfelde, Karow, Französisch Buchholz, Lübars and Hermsdorf.

Covering 750 square kilometers, 55% is forest, 32% is used for agriculture and 3% is water, including the lake Arkenberger Baggersee. The remainder is settlement and land transport. It is the only natural park in Berlin. In the east there is a glacial valley.

The visitor center of the Barnim Nature Park has been merged with the Agricultural Museum Wandlitz and is situated inside the Barnim Panorama.
