= Luchsee =

Lake in Brandenburg, Germany

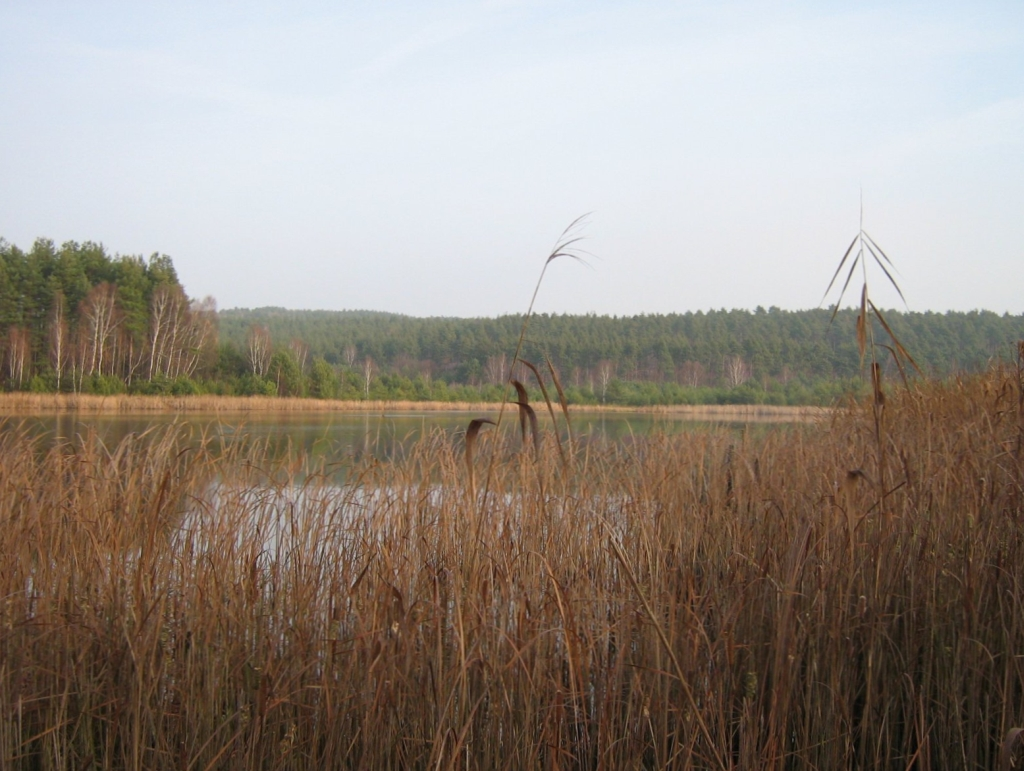

- Location within Brandenburg
- Location: Brandenburg
- Coordinates: 52°2′38″N 13°47′51″E
- Primary inflows: none
- Primary outflows: none
- Basin countries: Germany
- Max. length: ca. 300 m (980 ft)
- Max. width: 100 m (330 ft)
- Surface area: 7.2 ha (18 acres)
- Max. depth: 2 m (6 ft 7 in)
- Surface elevation: 527 m (1,729 ft)

Luchsee is a lake in Brandenburg, Germany. It lies at an elevation of 52.7 m and has a surface area is 7.2 ha. It is located in the municipality of Krausnick-Groß Wasserburg, close to the Krausnick hills. As part of the European Union's Habitats Directive, the lake protects three habitat types. In 2004, Luchsee was confirmed as a Site of Community Importance.
