= Blankenfelde =

- Quarter of Berlin
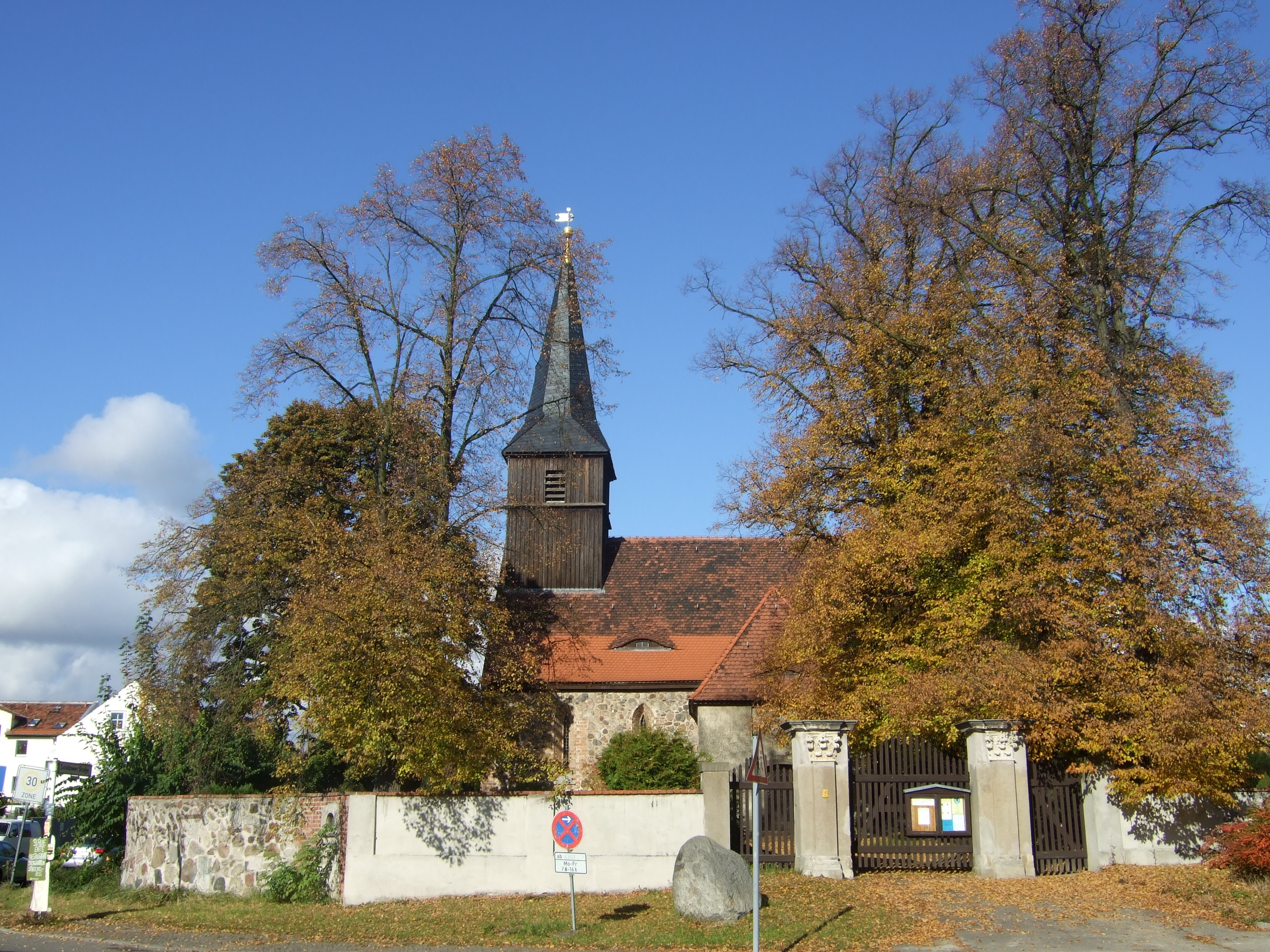
- Village church

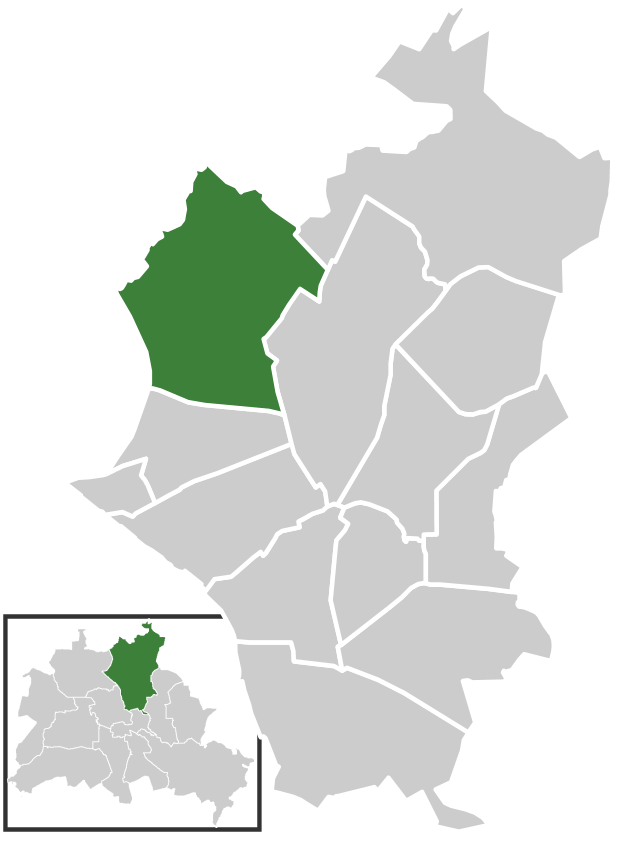
- Location of Blankenfelde in Pankow and Berlin
- Interactive map of Blankenfelde
- Location within Germany Location within Berlin
- Coordinates: 52°37′07″N 13°23′24″E
- Country: Germany
- State: Berlin
- City: Berlin
- Borough: Pankow
- Founded: 1375
- Subdivisions: 2 zones

Area
  - Total: 13.4 km^{2} (5.2 sq mi)
- Elevation: 80 m (260 ft)

Population (2024-12-31)
  - Total: 2,423
  - Density: 181/km^{2} (468/sq mi)
- Time zone: UTC+01:00 (CET)
  - Summer (DST): UTC+02:00 (CEST)
- Postal codes: 13159
- Vehicle registration: B

Blankenfelde (German: [ˈblaŋkŋ̍ˌfɛldə]) is a locality (Ortsteil) located within the Berlin borough (Bezirk) of Pankow. Of the city's 95 localities, it is the least densely populated.

== History ==
Blankenfelde was founded around 1375 and was integrated into Berlin in 1920 via the "Greater Berlin Act". After World War II, it was part of East Berlin from 1949 to 1990. From 1961 to 1989, its western borders were part of the Berlin Wall.

== Geography ==
=== Overview ===
Located in the northern outskirts of the city, Blankenfelde borders on the Brandenburg municipalities of Mühlenbecker Land in the Oberhavel district and Wandlitz in the district of Barnim. Within Berlin, its neighboring localities are Buch, Französisch Buchholz, and Rosenthal in the borough of Pankow and Lübars in the Reinickendorf borough. Blankenfelde's largest lake is the Arkenberger Baggersee, located in a rural part of the Barnim Nature Park.

=== Subdivision ===
Blankenfelde is divided into 2 zones (Ortslagen):

- Arkenberge
- Stadtrandsiedlung Blankenfelde

== Transport ==
Though crossed by the S-Bahn line S8, it has no direct access to the railway. Formerly, it was served by the now defunct branch of a local suburban line, the Heidekrautbahn, to which an abandoned station bears witness. Plans to re-activate the former line as part of the Berlin public transport system have been hypothesized but not yet finalized. Bus line 107 serves the area.

== Photogallery ==
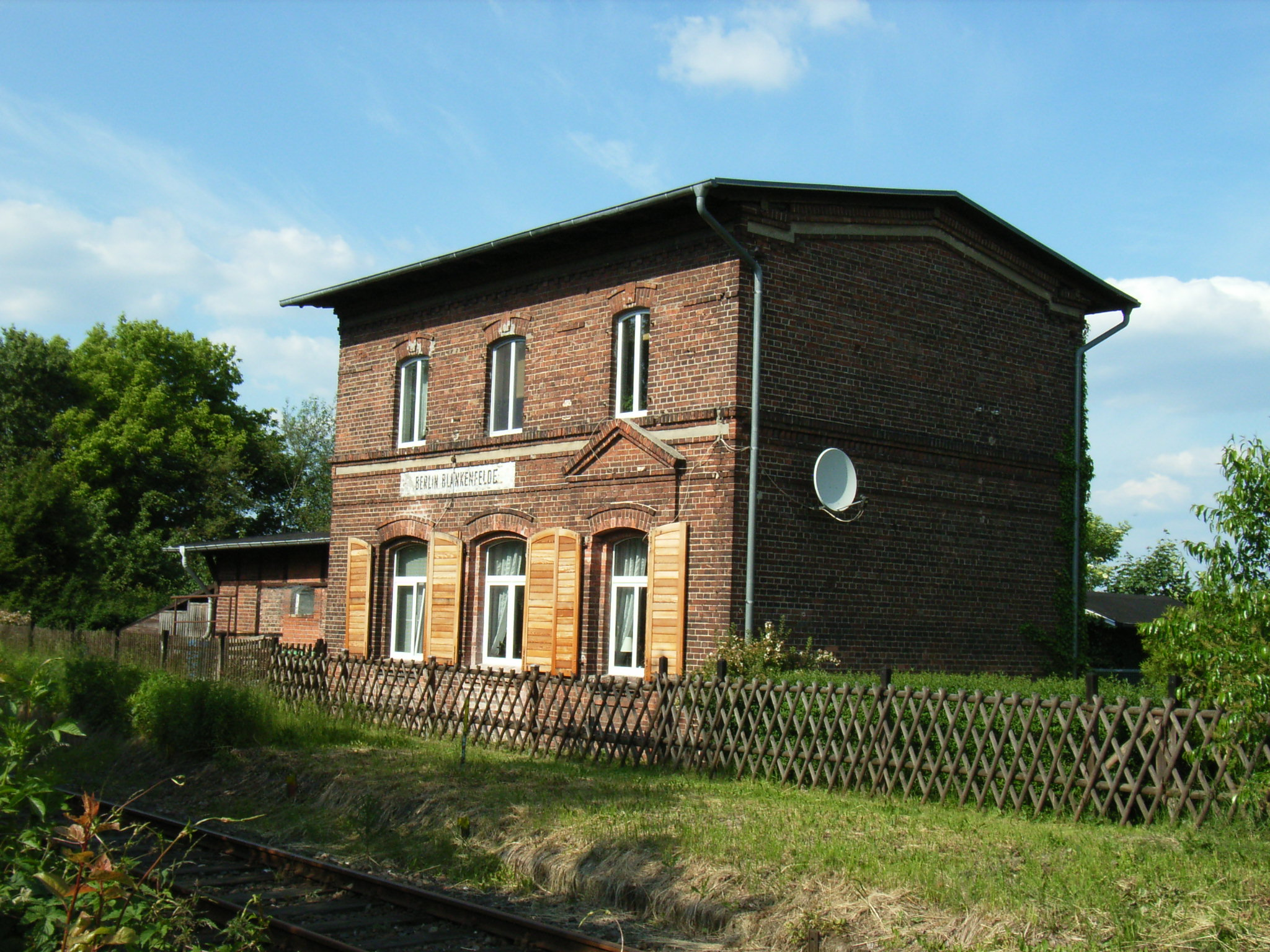
The former Berlin-Blankenfelde station

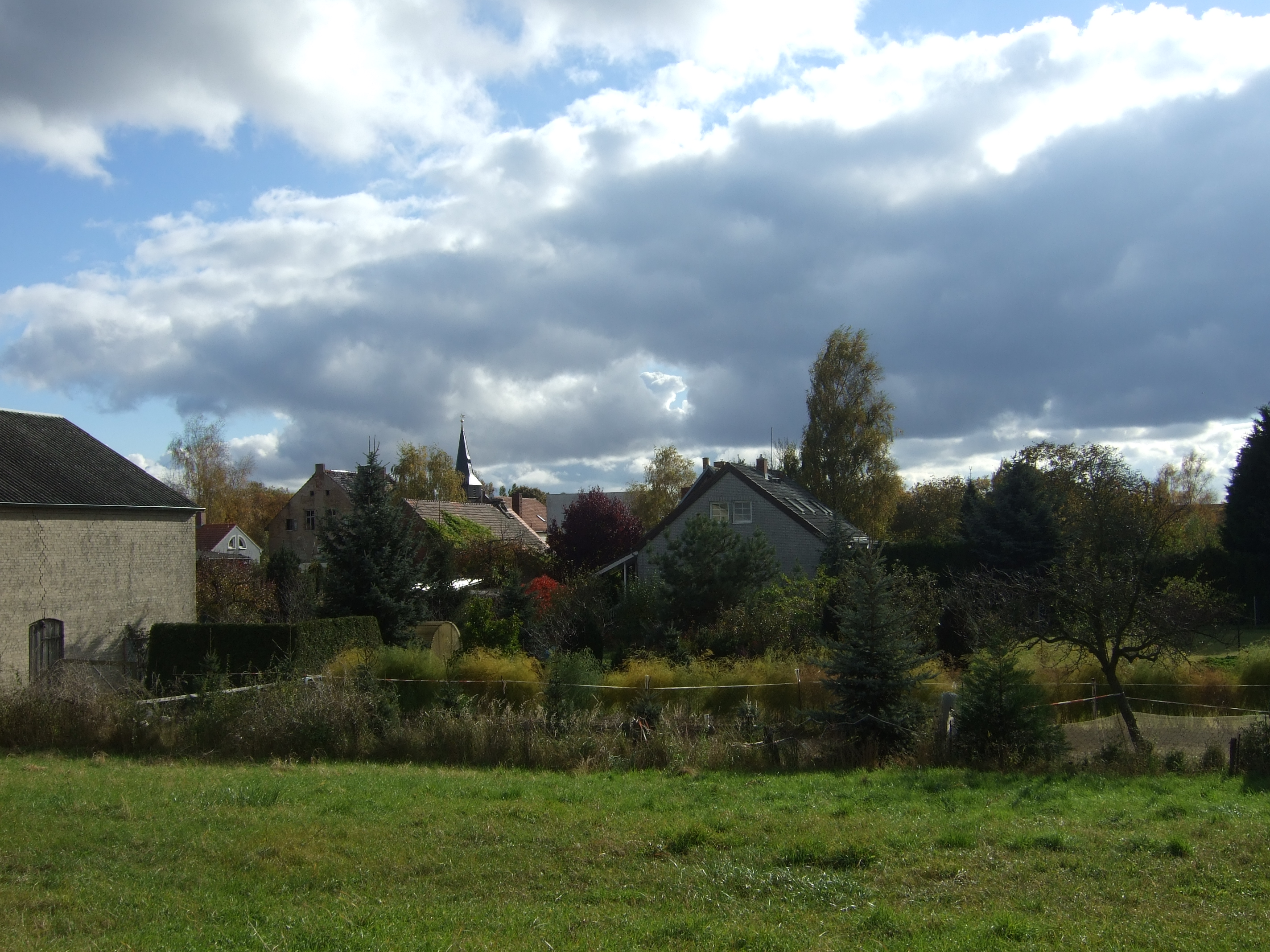
Northern view of Blankenfelde
