= Krausnick hills =

Coordinates: 52°04′N 13°48′E

- Krausnicker Berge
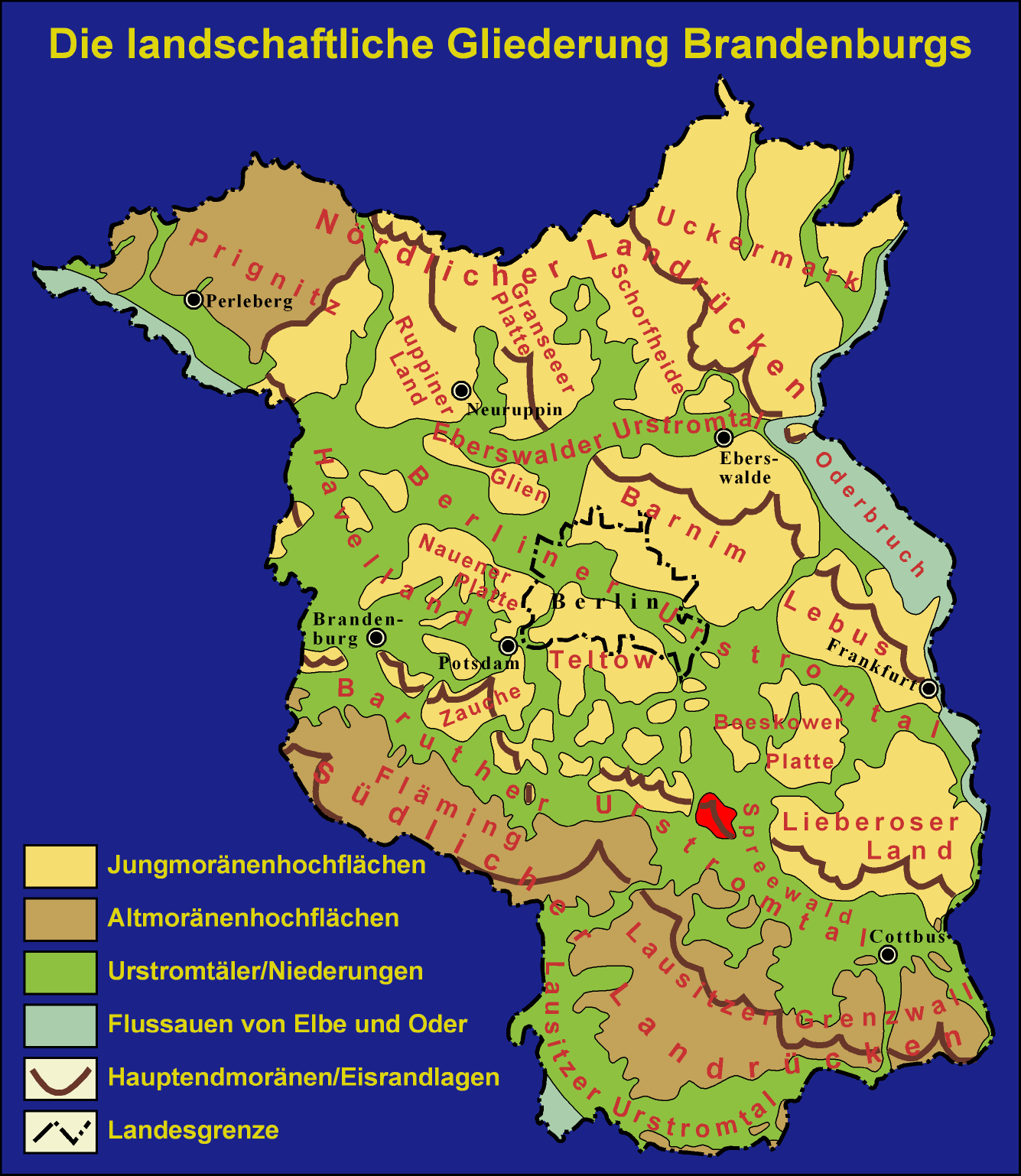

Highest point
- Peak: Wehlaberg
- Elevation: 144 m (472 ft)

Geography
- Location: Brandenburg, Germany

The Krausnick hills (German: Krausnicker Berge) are a small range of hills in Eastern Germany in the federal state of Brandenburg.

== Name and location ==
The Krausnick hills are named after the village of Krausnick to their south. Their highest point is the Wehlaberg at 144 metres above sea level. The Krausnick hills form the boundary between the Spreewald to the southeast and the Dahmeland to the northwest. Both the hills themselves and the adjacent lakes (the Heideseen and Luchsee) belong to the Spreewald Biosphere Reserve and are popular tourist destinations.

== Sights ==
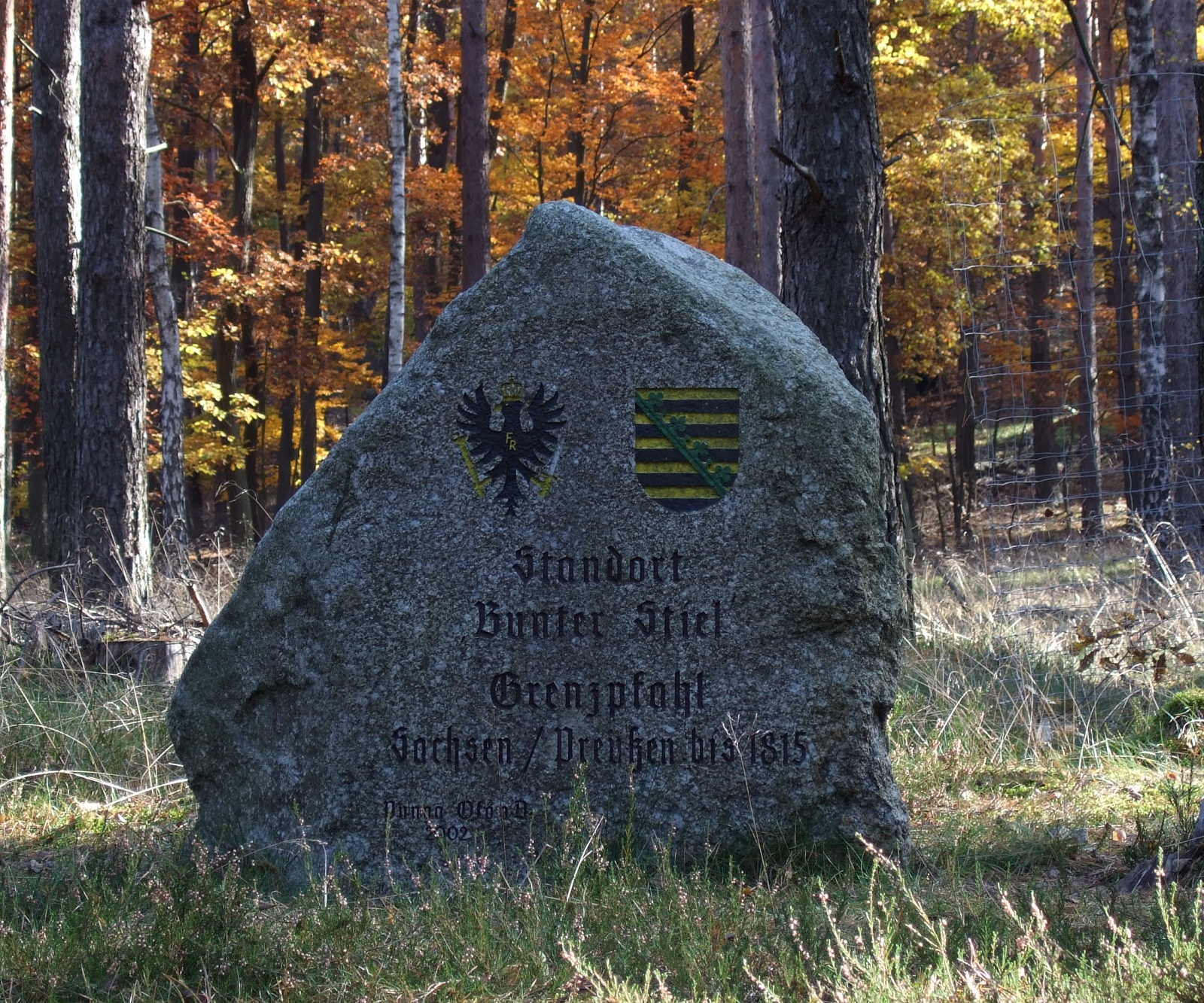
The Bunter Stiel border stone

- Because of their relative height, which is extreme for the state of Brandenburg (100 metres in less than 1 km), the hills are a popular destination.
- Since 2003 there has been an observation tower on the Wehlaberg. In good visibility there are views as far as the Berlin Television Tower and the Jänschwalde Power Station (each ca. 60 km away).
- The border between Saxony and Prussia ran over the Krausnick hills until 1815. The local name Bunter Stiel recalls the site of the border posts which are marked today by a commemorative stone of the same name.
- About 2 km west of the Wehlaberg is another commemorative stone on a forest path by the former site of the Hungriger Wolf ("Hungry Wolf") inn, once a stop on the main trade route from Berlin to Cottbus.
- There are some surviving oak trees, a legacy of the former oak mixed woodland here.
- The Heideseen lakes on the Krausnick hills are also a popular destination.
