= Semmelberg =

Hill in Brandenburg, Germany

Coordinates: 52°44′29″N 13°57′43″E

Geography
- Location: Brandenburg, Germany

Semmelberg is a hill of Brandenburg, Germany.
