= Kutschenberg =

Hill in Brandenburg, Germany

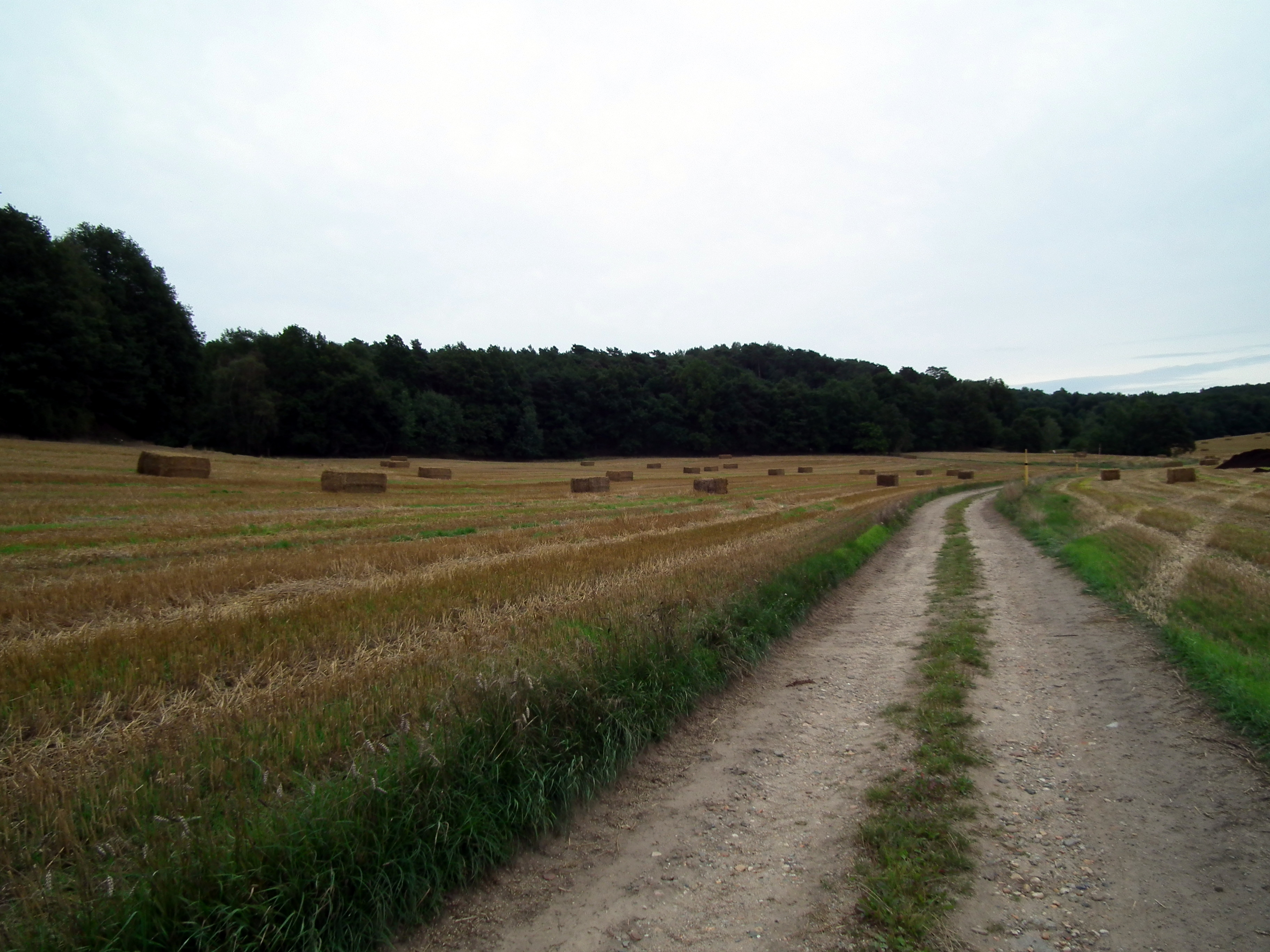
- The Kutschenberg (centre) in the Kmehlener Berge

Highest point
- Elevation: 201 m above sea level (NHN) (659 ft)
- Listing: highest hill in Brandenburg
- Coordinates: 51°21′55″N 13°43′38″E

Geography
- Location: near Großkmehlen; Oberspreewald-Lausitz, Brandenburg, Germany
- Parent range: Kmehlener Berge

Geology
- Rock age: 210,000 to 165,000 years ago
- Mountain type: ice age terminal moraine
- Rock type: till of the Drenthe Stage of the Saale glaciation

The Kutschenberg is the highest hill in Brandenburg, Germany. It is part of the low hill range of the Kmehlener Berge and rises near Großkmehlen in the county of Oberspreewald-Lausitz. It is 201 m above sea level (NHN) and located only a few metres from the state border with Saxony.

== Geography ==
=== Location ===
The Kutschenberg is 2.5 km west-southwest of Ortrand and 1.5 kilometres south of Großkmehlen not far from the A 13 motorway to the west and within a small area of woodland in the Kmehlener Berge.

=== Height ===
New surveys in 2000 discovered that the summit of the Kutschenberg was 201.0 m high and thus the highest hill in the state of Brandenburg. As a result, in 2011 a small granite stele was erected on its densely wooded summit that rises only slightly above its surroundings. The stele is inscribed with the words "KUTSCHENBERG 201 m ü. NHN". Near the summit at 199.7 m is a trig point.

About 11 km to the west near Gröden is the Heidehöhe which, at 201.4 m, is slightly higher than the Kutschenberg, but is not the highest hill in Brandenburg, but its highest point, because the summit above it, the Heideberg, lies in Saxony. There is commonly held notion that the Hagelberg (200.24 m) on the Fläming Heath is the highest hill in Brandenburg, but the Kutschenberg is just a little higher.

== Am Kutschenberg racetrack ==
On the northeast hillside of the Kutschenberg about 400 metres from the summit is the nationally known offroad racetrack of Am Kutschenberg, where car and motorcycle races are regularly held.

== Gallery ==
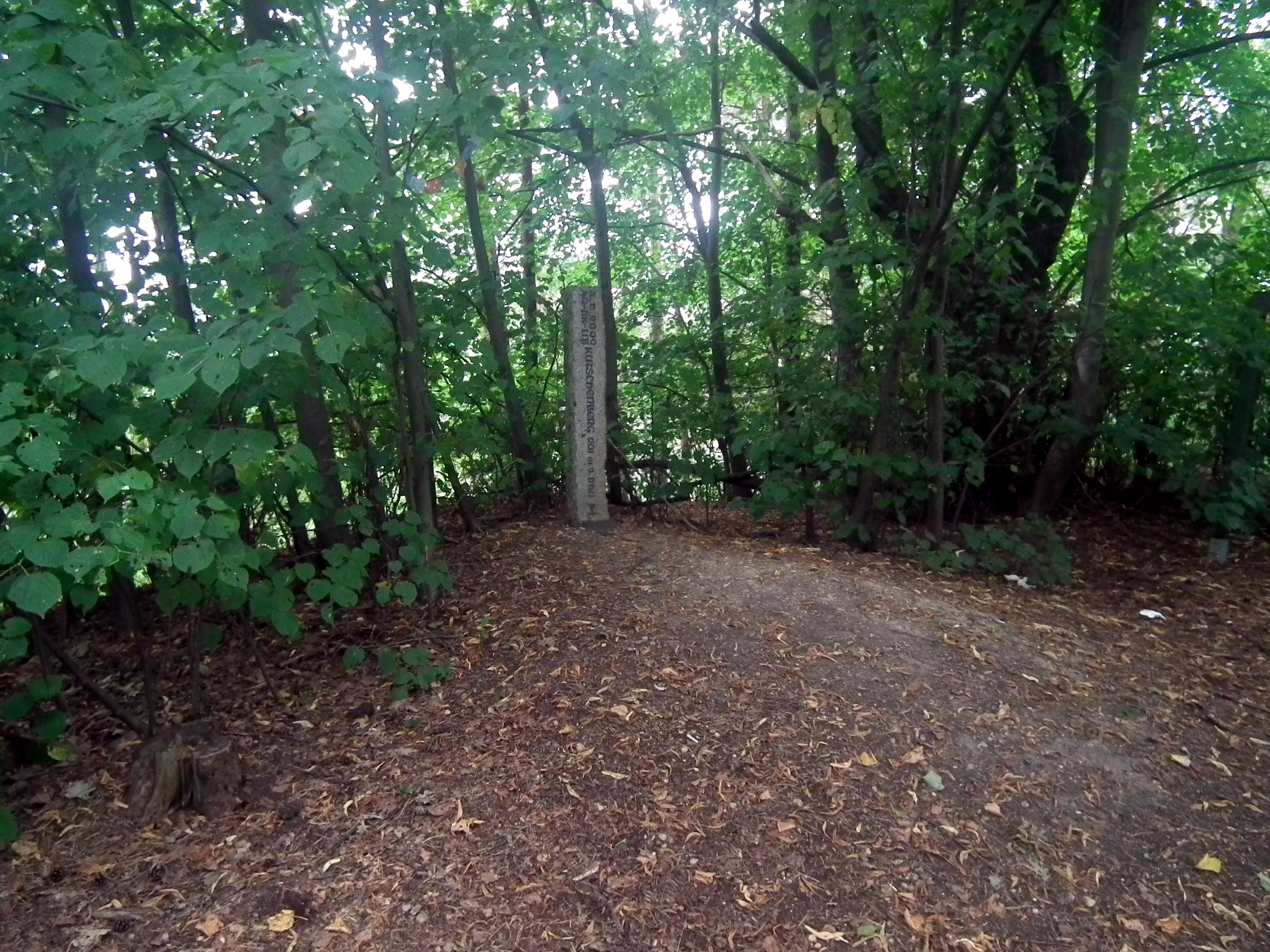
Summit of the Kutschenberg

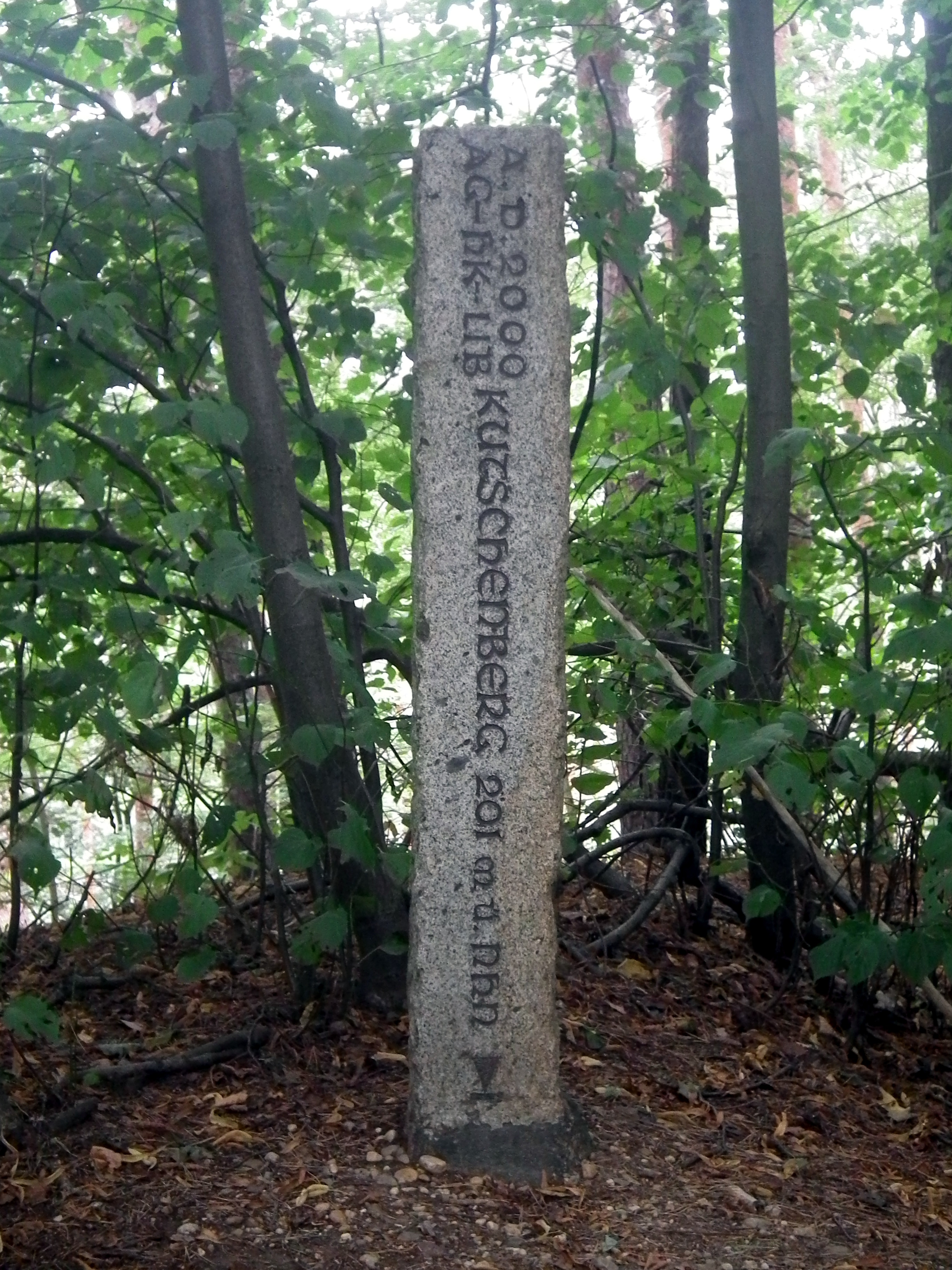
Summit stele on the Kutschenberg

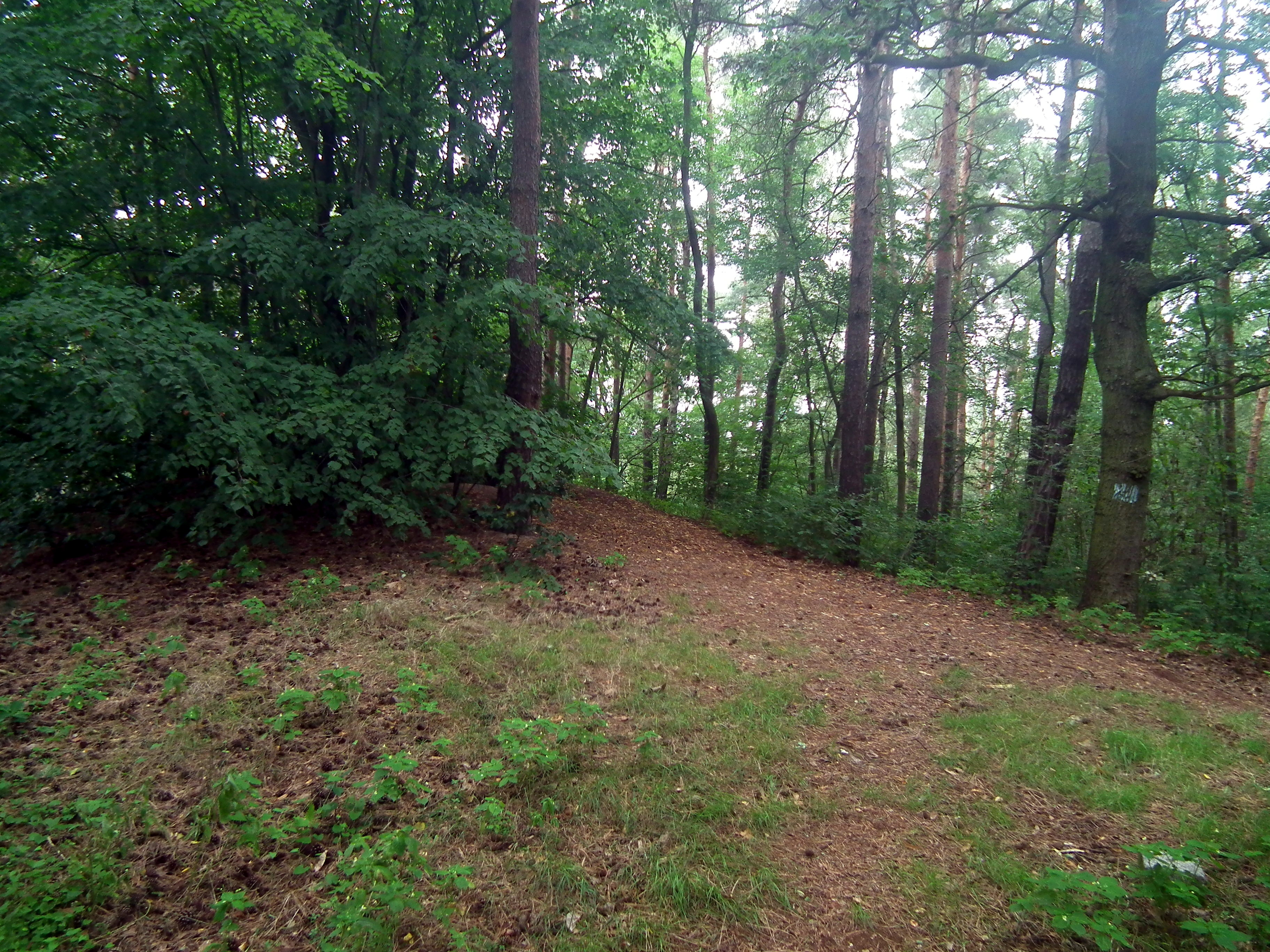
Summit plateau of the Kutschenberg

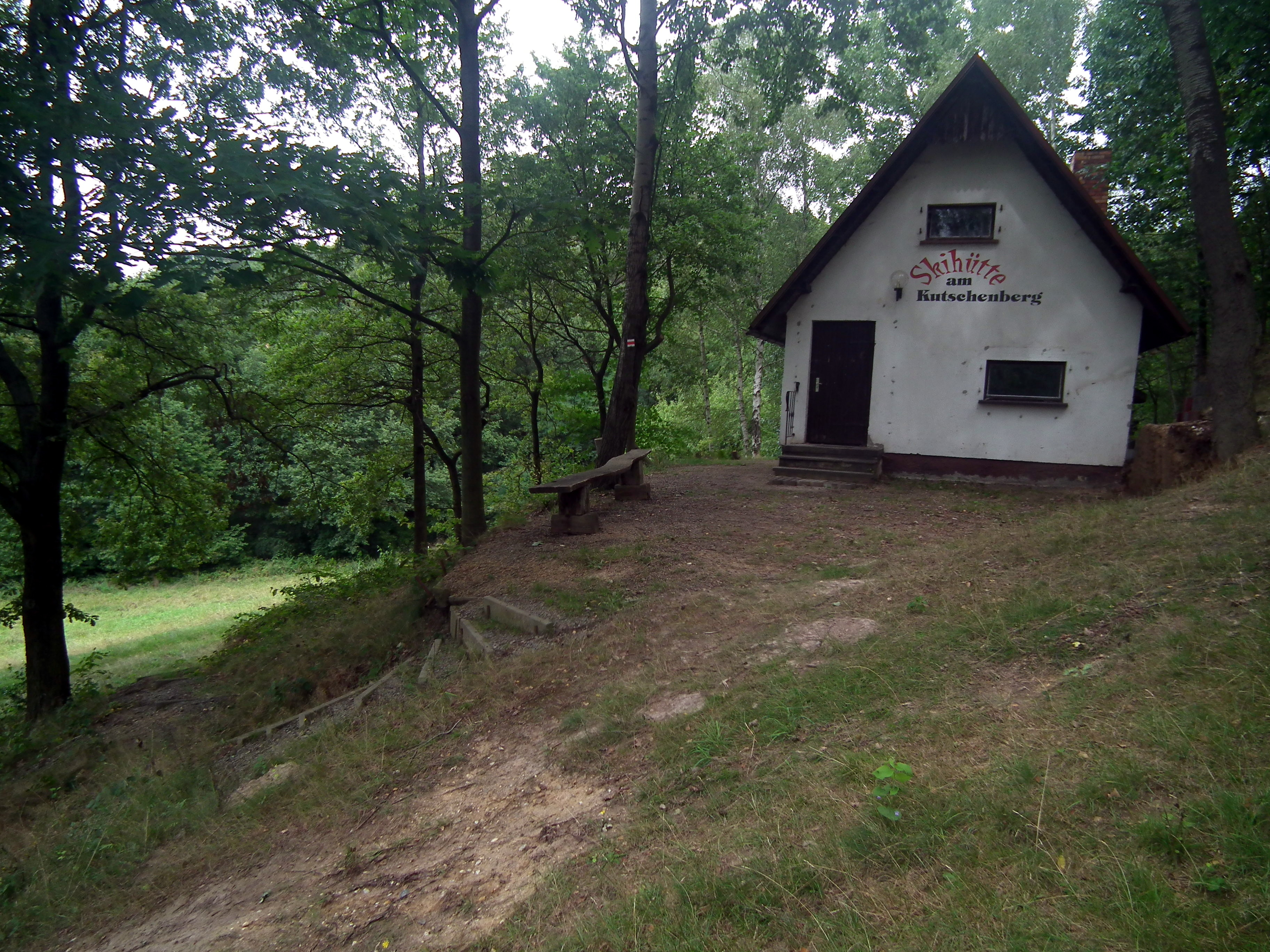
Skihütte am Kutschenberg

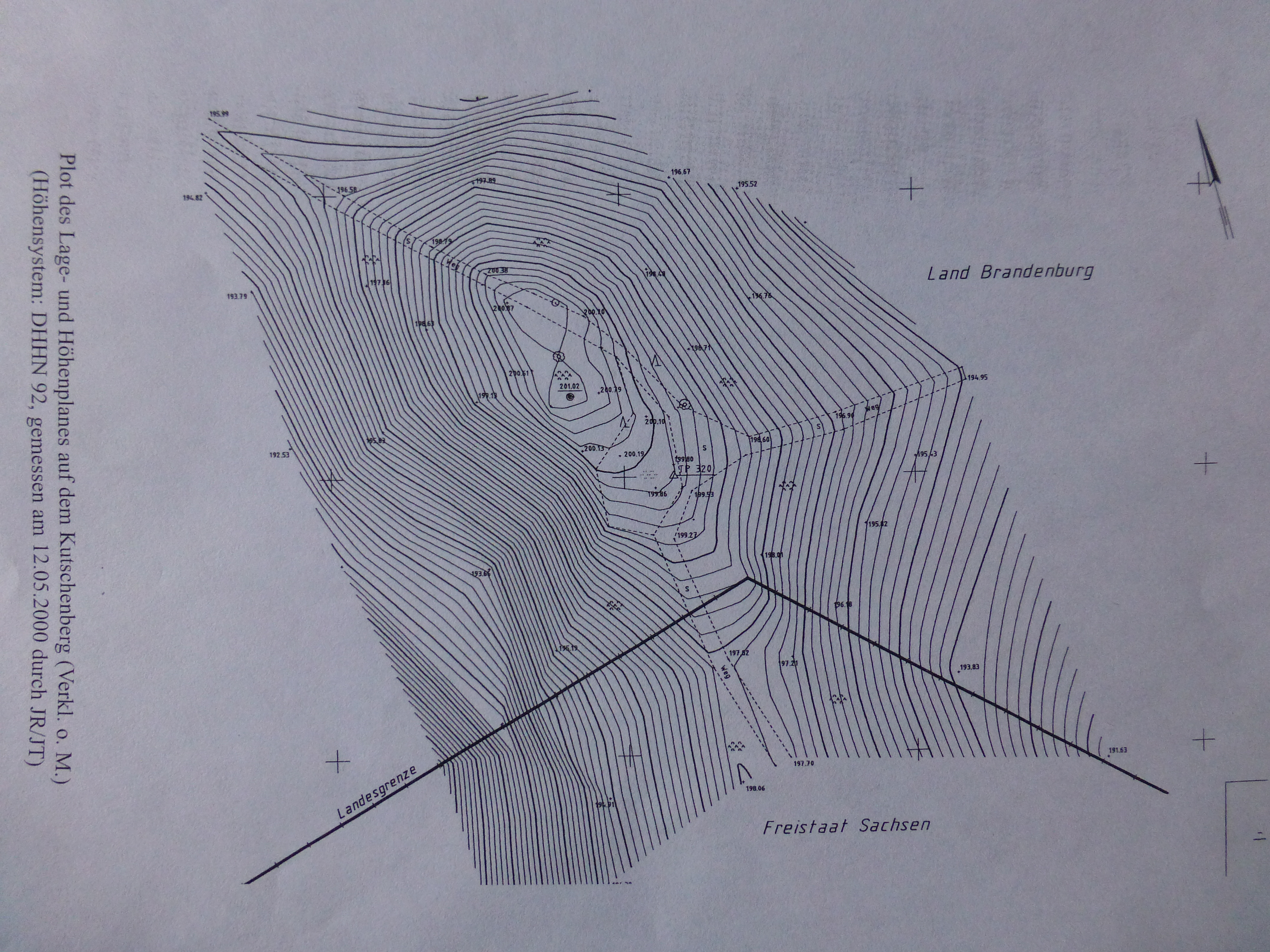
Plot des Lage- und Höhenplanes auf dem Kutschenberg

== See also ==
- List of hills of Brandenburg
