= Friedehorst Park =

Friedehorst Park Lehnhof Park
- Interactive map of Friedehorst Park; Lehnhof Park
- Type: public recreation park
- Location: Bremen
- Area: 9 hectares (22 acres)
- Operator: Evangelical Church of Bremen

Eminence in Friedehorst Park
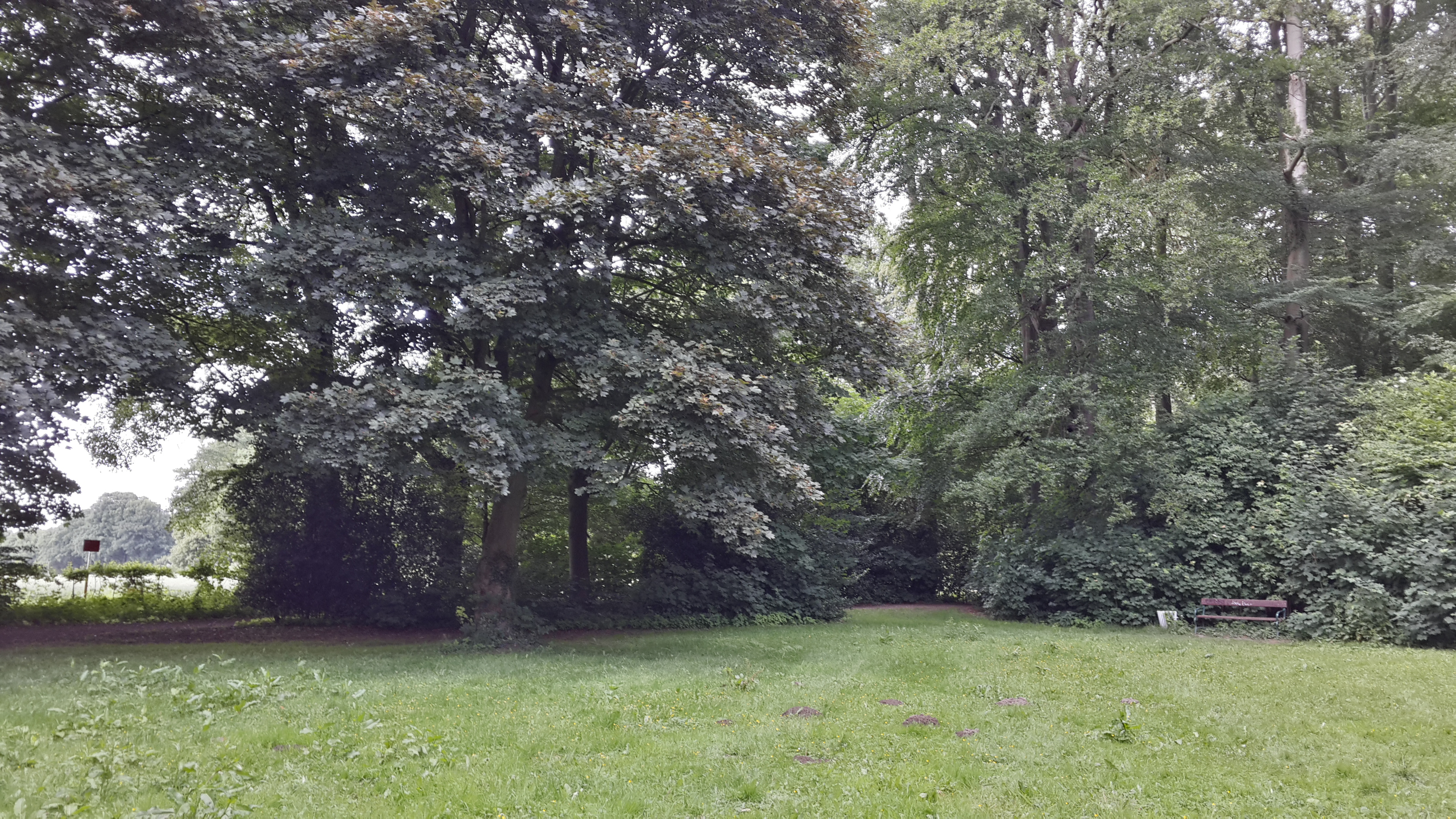

Highest point
- Elevation: 32.5 m above sea level (NHN) (107 ft)
- Coordinates: 53°10′39″N 8°40′23″E

Geography
- Location within Lower Saxony
- Location: In Friedehorst Park on the border between Bremen and Lower Saxony (Germany)

Climbing
- Normal route: Park path

The Friedehorst Park (German: Friedehorstpark), also called the Lehnhof Park (Lehnhofpark), is a green space in the Bremen borough of Burglesum on the border of states of Bremen and Lower Saxony. It is about 9 ha in area. It is home to the highest natural point in the state of Bremen reaching a height of 32.5 m above sea level (NHN). The park, which is open to the public, belongs to the Evangelical Church of Bremen.

== Geography ==
=== Location ===
Friedehorst Park is in St. Magnus, a suburb of the borough of Burglesum. It borders on the Lower Saxon county of Osterholz – in the east on the parish of Platjenwerbe in the municipality of Ritterhude and in the north and west on Löhnhorst, a village in the municipality of Schwanewede.

=== Bremen's highest point ===
At 32.5 m, the highest natural point in Bremen is an eminence in Friedehorst Park near the northern border of Bremen with Lower Saxony.

The top of the rubbish tip in the parish of Hohweg in the Bremen borough of Walle, is higher, being variously reported as 42 m and 49 m.

=== Protected area ===
Friedehorst Park and the suburb of Lehnhofsiedlung to the west lie within the fragmented, protected area of "Bremen 1968", which was designated in 1968 and covers over 32.81 km^{2} (CDDA-No. 378515).

== History ==
Friedehorst Park was laid out in about 1875 around the rural estate of Lehnhof, which was owned by the consul general, banker and senator, Theodor Lürmann, probably by Wilhelm Benque, creator of Bürgerpark Bremen and Knoops Park, in a rural style. The manor house, originally a building in the Swiss chalet style, was built in 1888 and replaced in 1904 by a new one in the Neo-Baroque style, which in turn was demolished in the 1930s. The park was originally larger than it is today, having an area of 16 ha. The Stiftung Friedehorst (Friedehorst Foundation) with its buildings is located on the eastern side of the park. To the west of the park the suburb of Lehnhofsiedlung was built in 1950/51.
