= Kleiner Rummelsberg =

Mountain in Brandenburg, Germany

Coordinates: 52°54′45″N 13°58′55″E

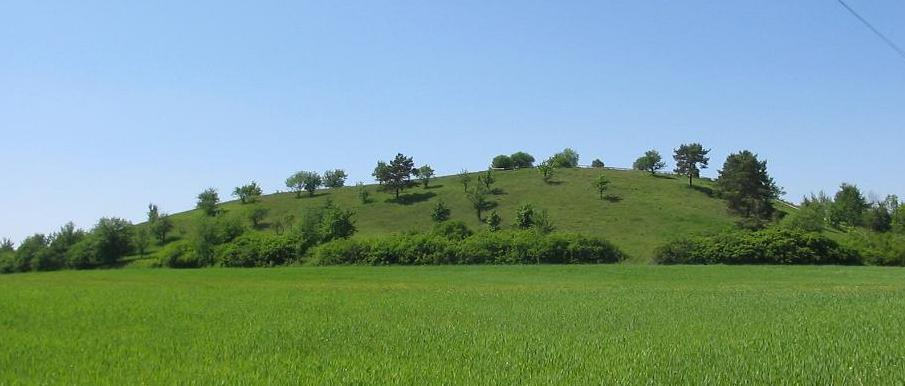

Geography
- Location: Brandenburg, Germany

Kleiner Rummelsberg is a hill in Brandenburg, Germany.
