= Golmberg =

Hill in Brandenburg, Germany

Coordinates: 52°01′N 13°21′E

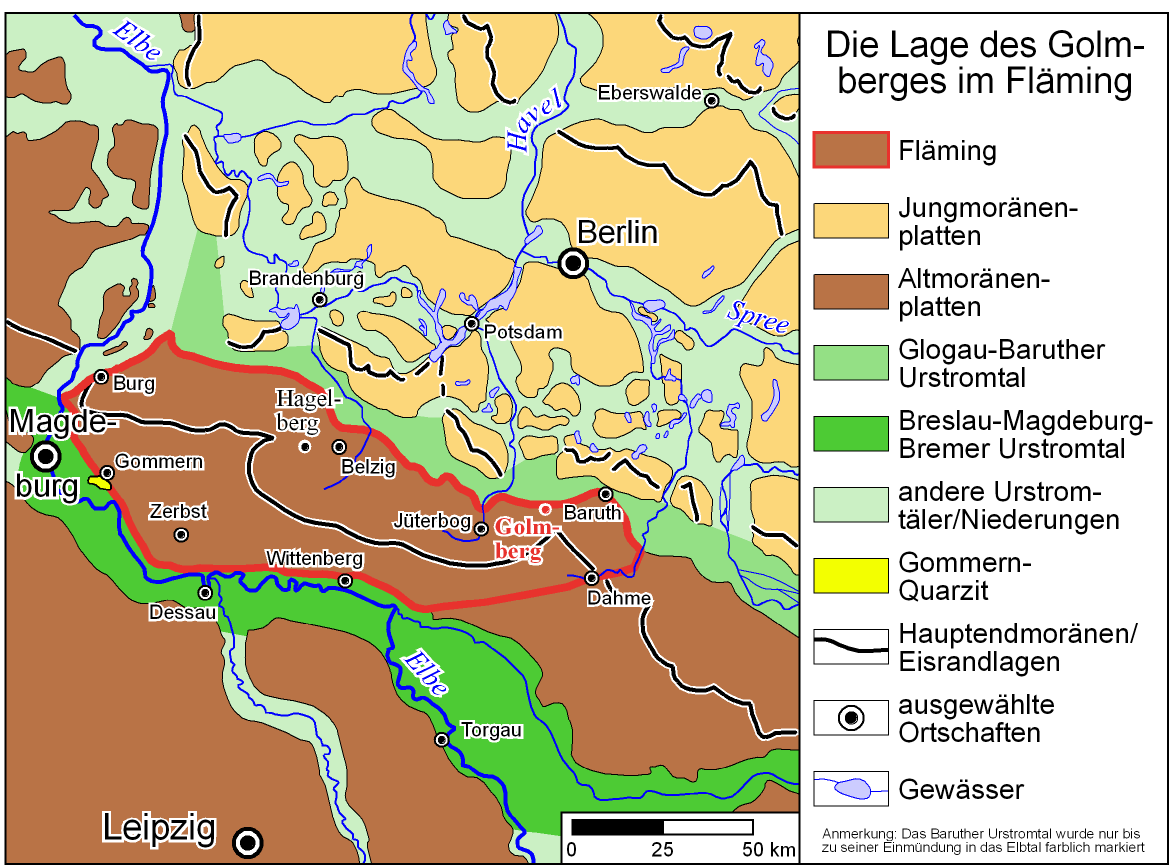
- Map showing the location of the Golmberg in Fläming

Geography
- Location: Brandenburg, Germany

Golmberg is a hill of Brandenburg, Germany.
