= Heidehöhe =

Coordinates: 51°22′57″N 13°34′27″E

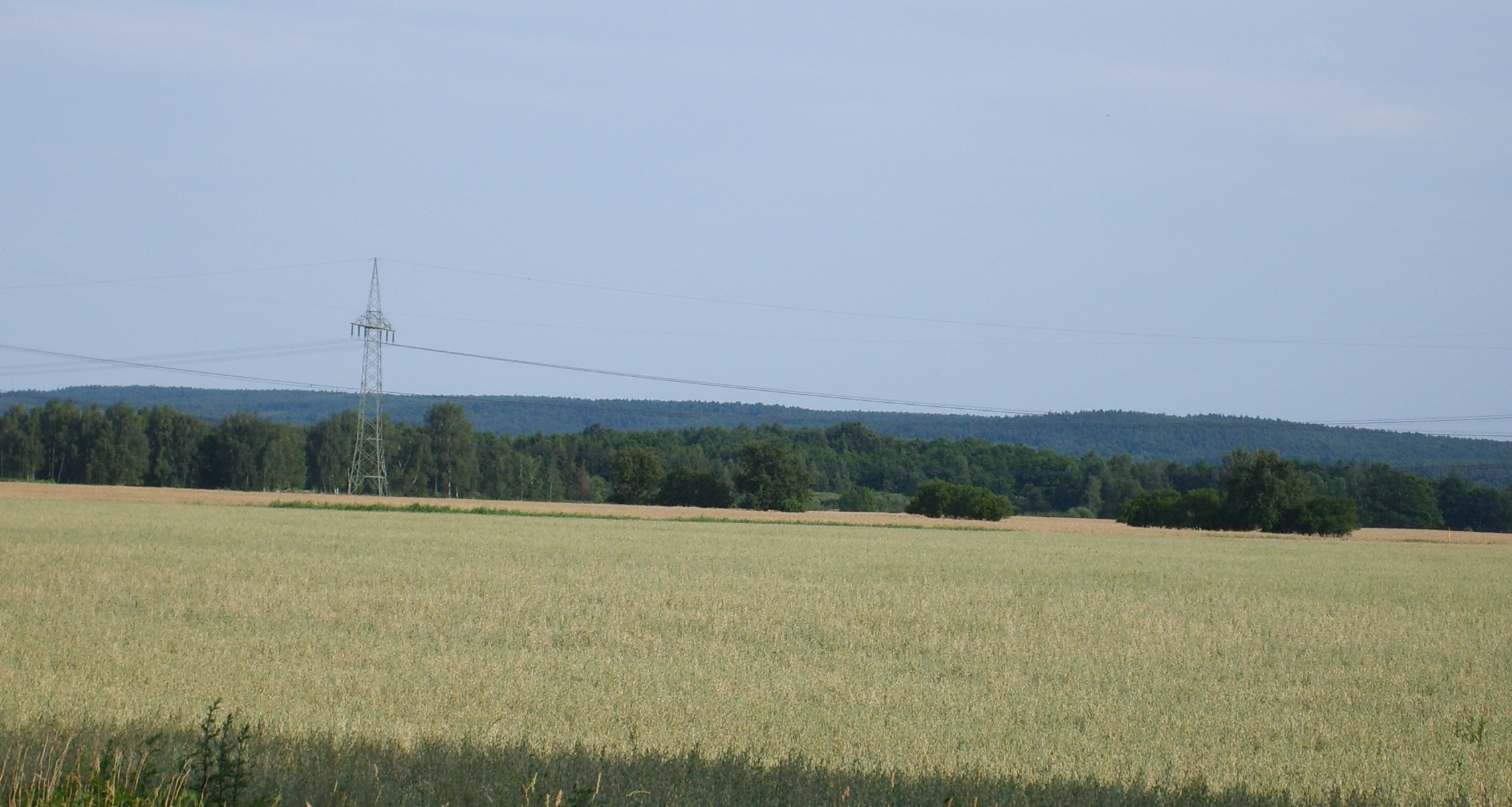
- The Heidehöhe seen from the north

Highest point
- Elevation: 201.4 m (661 ft)

Geography
- Location: Brandenburg, Germany

The Heidehöhe is a hill, 201.4 metres high, and the highest point in the state of Brandenburg, Germany. Its actual summit, known as the Heideberg, lies over the border in the state of Saxony and reaches a height of 206.1 metres.

== See also ==
- Kutschenberg
