= Kmehlener Berge =

Hill range in Germany

- Location within Brandenburg

Highest point
- Peak: Huttenberg
- Elevation: 212.1 m above NHN

Geography
- State(s): Oberspreewald-Lausitz, Brandenburg, Germany
- Range coordinates: 51°22′01″N 13°43′59″E

The Kmehlener Berge are a group of low hills in the south of the German state of Brandenburg within the county of Oberspreewald-Lausitz near the town of Ortrand and the village of Großkmehlen on the state border with Saxony. Their highest point, at 212.1 m above sea level (NHN), is on the Huttenberg which lies entirely within Saxony. The Kutschenberg, about 1,000 metres northeast, rises to a height of 201 m and is the highest summit and second highest point in the state of Brandenburg.
