= Arkenberge =

Highest point in Berlin, Germany

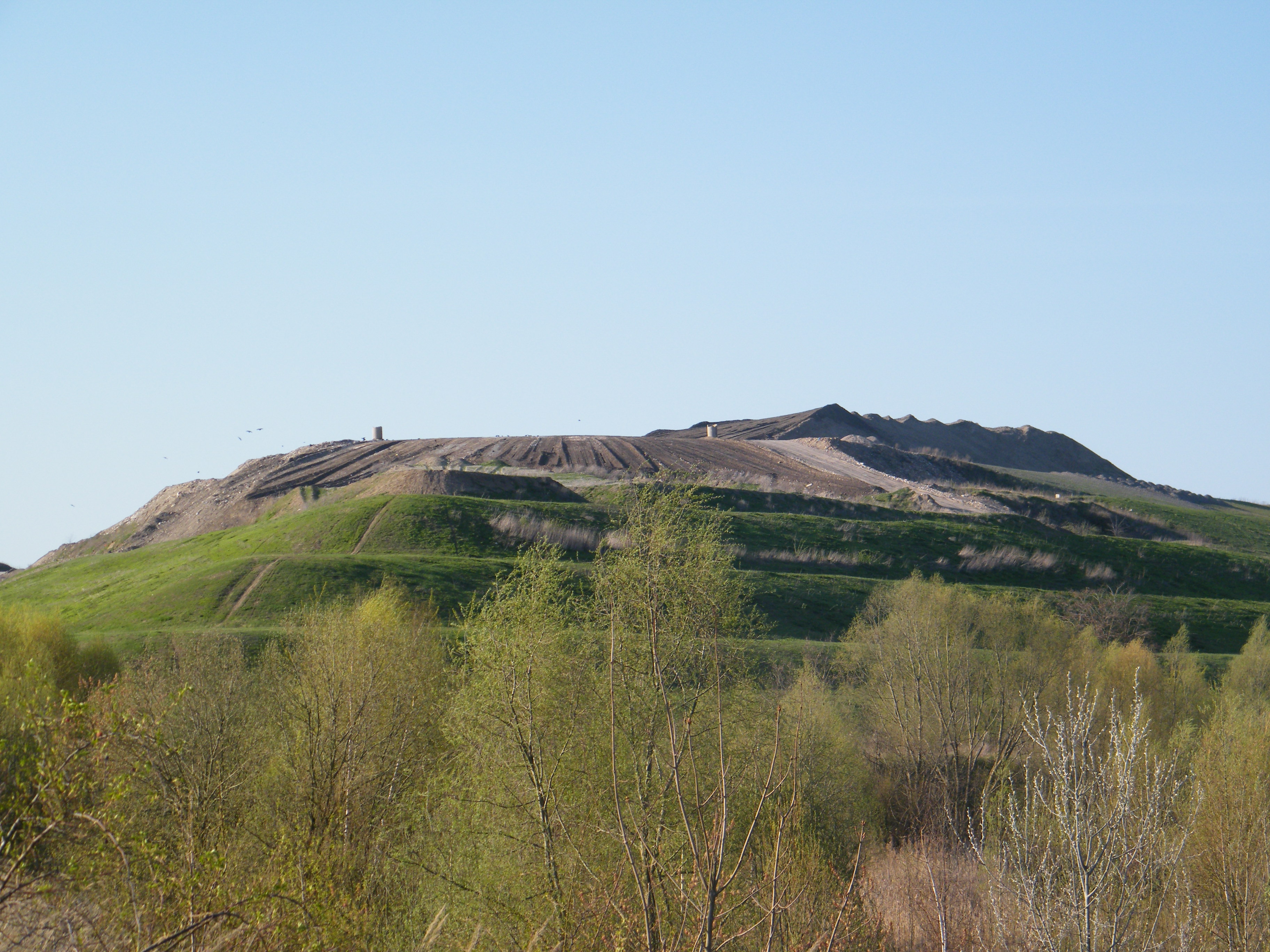
- View of the Arkenberge rubbish tip

Highest point
- Elevation: 120.7 m (396 ft) measurement
- Coordinates: 52°38′24″N 13°24′28″E

Geography
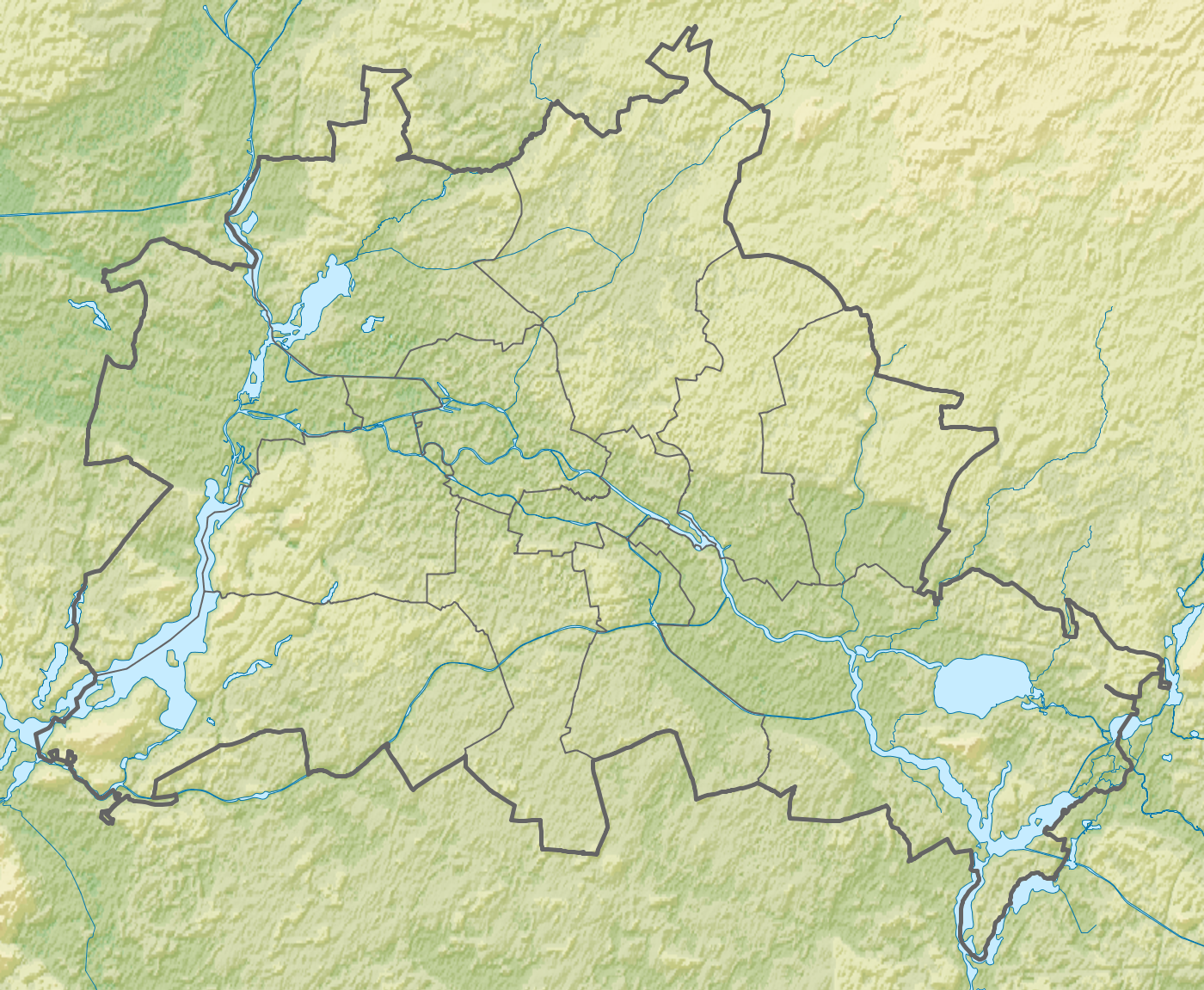
- Location within Berlin
- Location: Berlin (Deutschland)

The Arkenberge is a hill in the Berlin municipality of Blankenfelde in the borough of Pankow. The name was originally given to a natural hill ridge on the site, and the nearby settlement of Arkenberge was named after that chain of little hills. In 1984 a rubble heap for building waste was established east of this settlement. In January 2015, it was determined that the top of this tip had reached a height of 120.7 m above sea level (NHN). Since then it has been ranked as the highest point in the state of Berlin, superseding the Teufelsberg. However, the highest natural point in Berlin is the Großer Müggelberg (114.7 m above sea level (NHN)).

== History ==
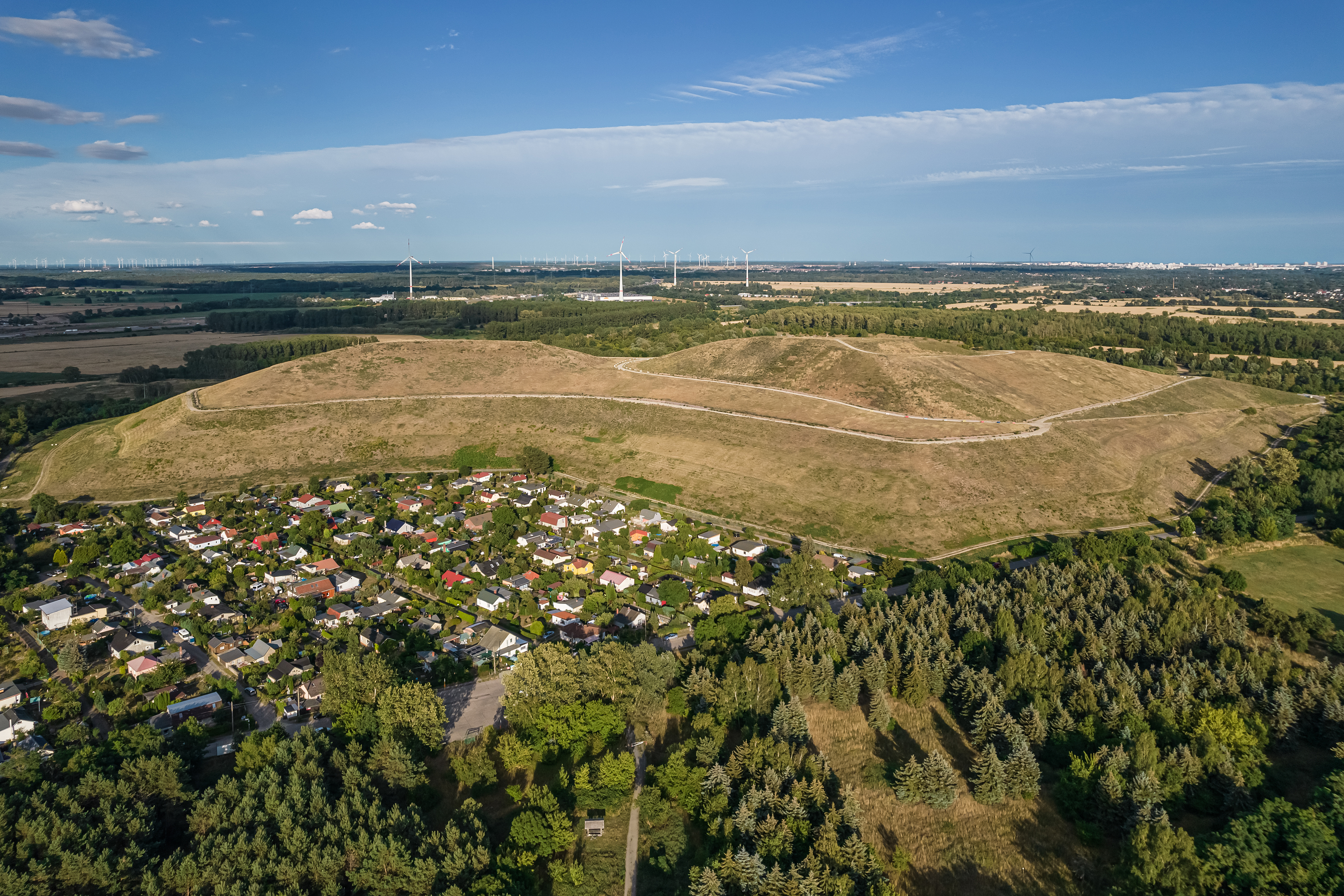
View over the settlement of Arkenberge to the hill

The original Arkenberge were a natural hillock chain of Pleistocene origin. On a 1911 survey map, its highest point is given as 70.3 metres. In the course of the 20th century, it was largely dug out. In addition, in the 1950s the railway track bed of the Berlin Outer Ring was laid through the area. The highest point of the remaining hill chain is 64.8 metres above sea level; the surrounding terrain lies between 53 and 57 metres. In the 1930s, the settlement of Arkenberge grew up in the local area.

In 1984, a construction waste site was established east of the settlement on a 36-hectare site. In 1998, the dumping of building waste was ended, but in 1999 more construction waste was used to profile and recultivate the landfill site. As part of that, it was planned to create a hill with two observation plateaux, optically separated by a saddle.

Around 2000, plans crystallised, to make the area around the Arkenberge into a recreation area. In 2015, it was announced that the Arkenberge would be opened as a public park in 2019. As of May 2025, this has not yet been implemented.

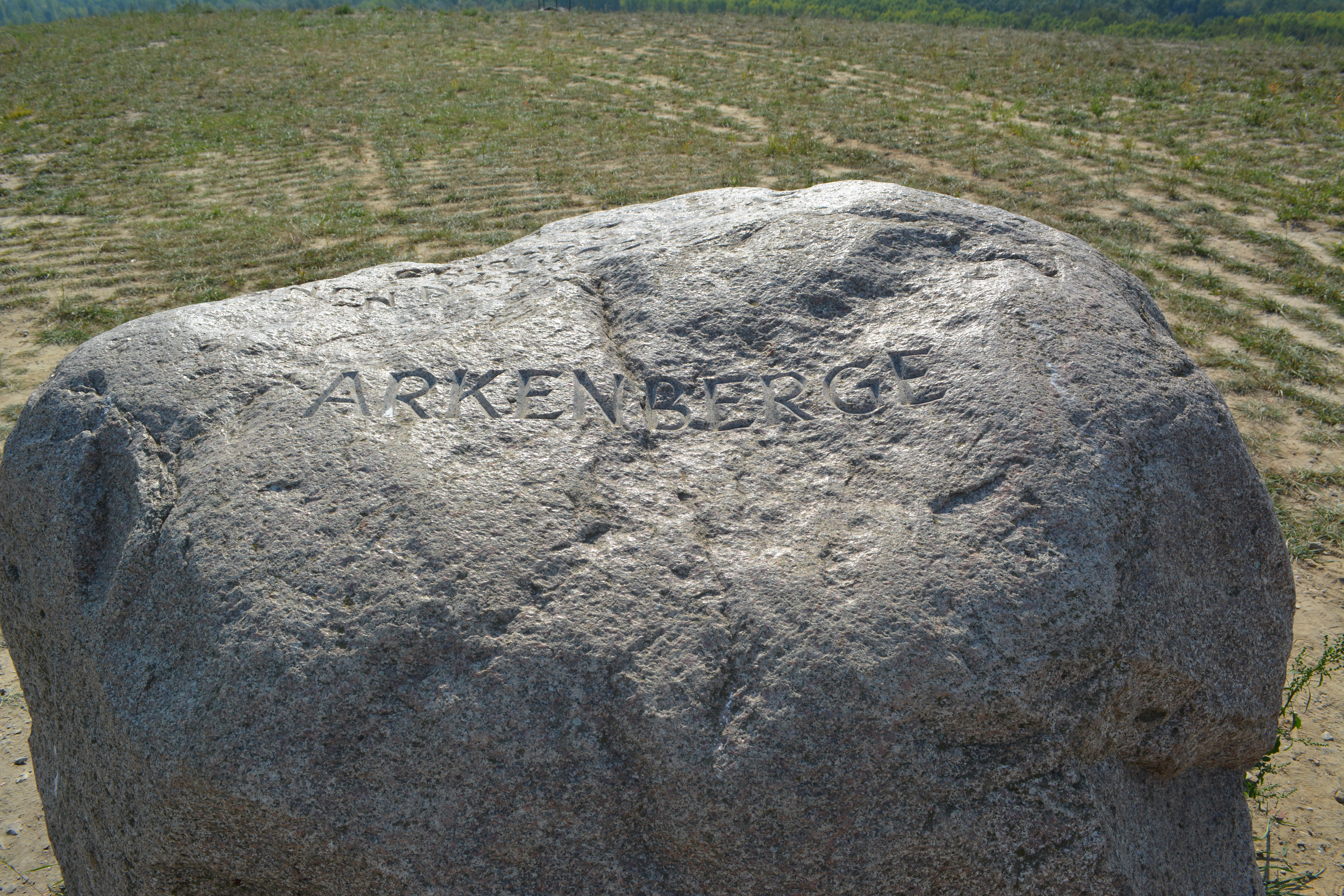
The glacial erratic monument on the hill

On the occasion of the new survey in 2015 a glacial erratic with an inscription recording its status as Berlin's highest point, was placed on the summit.

== See also ==
- List of hills of Berlin
