= Wehlaberg =

Hill in Brandenburg, Germany

Coordinates: 52°03′29″N 13°48′04″E

Geography
- Location: Brandenburg, Germany

Wehlaberg is a hill in Brandenburg, Germany.
