= Humboldthöhe =

Hill in Berlin, Germany

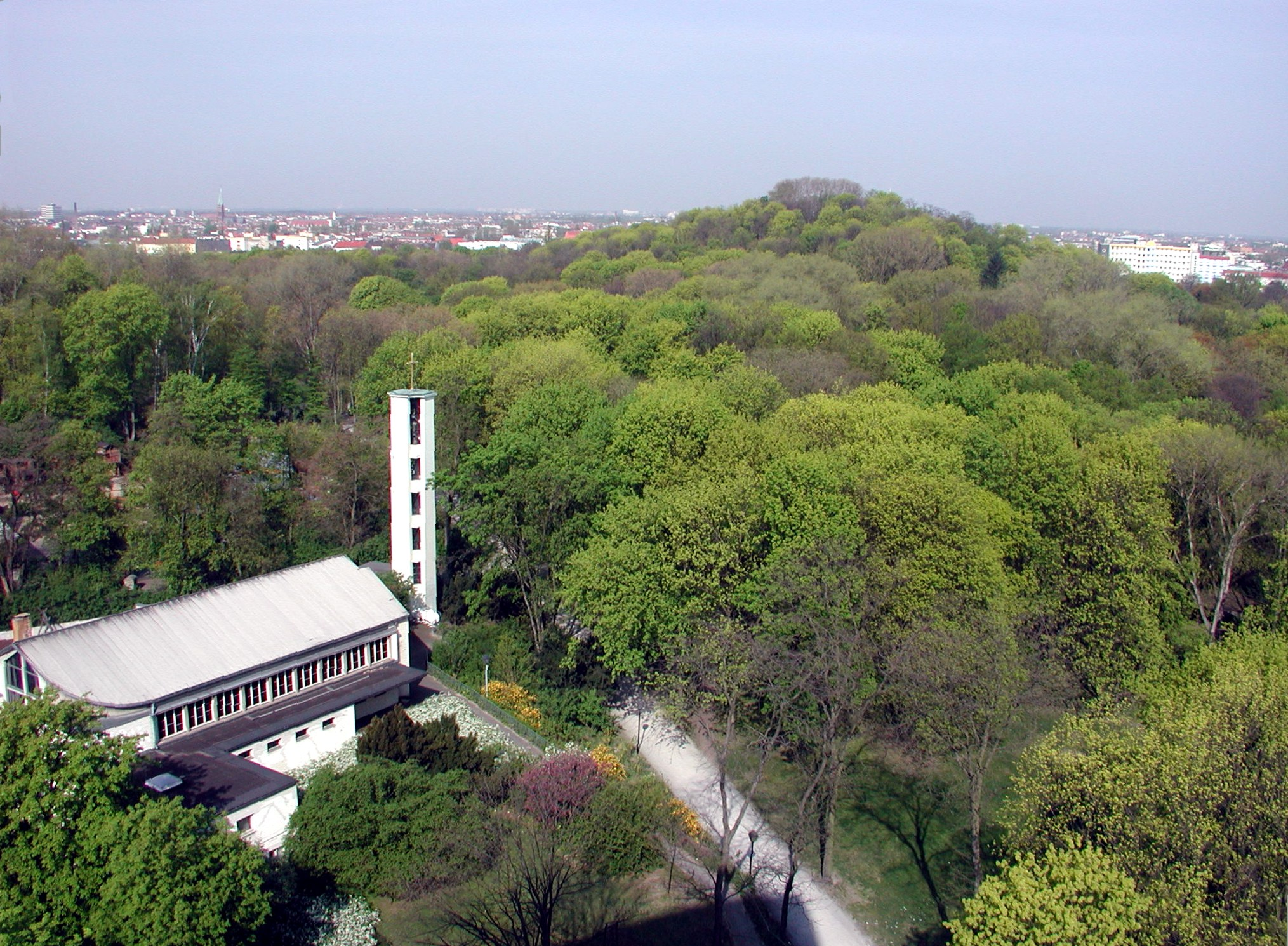
- View of Humboldthöhe (rubble hill) in the park

Highest point
- Elevation: 85 m (279 ft)
- Coordinates: 52°32′50″N 13°23′06″E

Geography
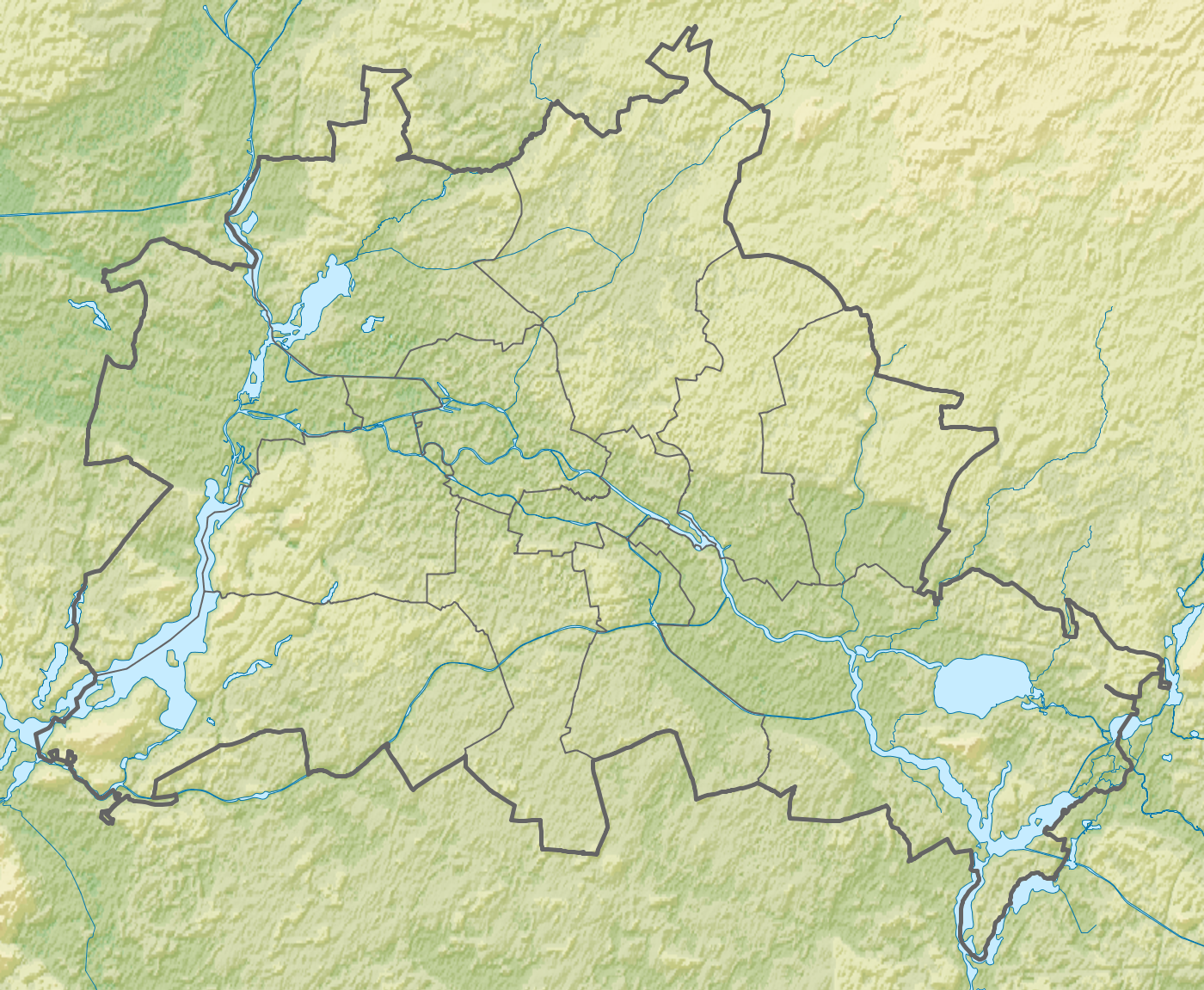
- Location within Berlin
- Location: Gesundbrunnen, Berlin, Germany

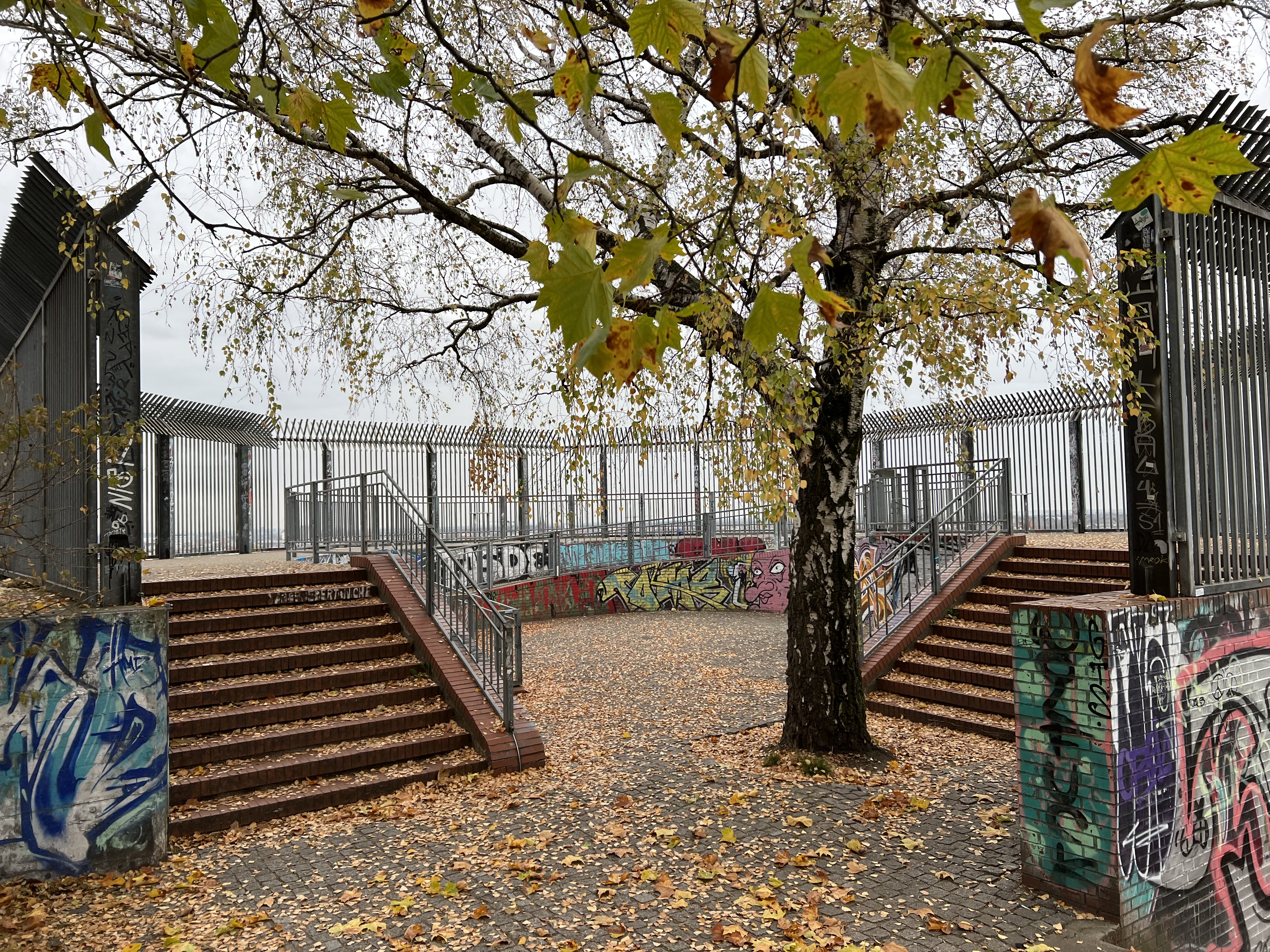
Stairway area leading up to the flak tower remains in Humboldthain

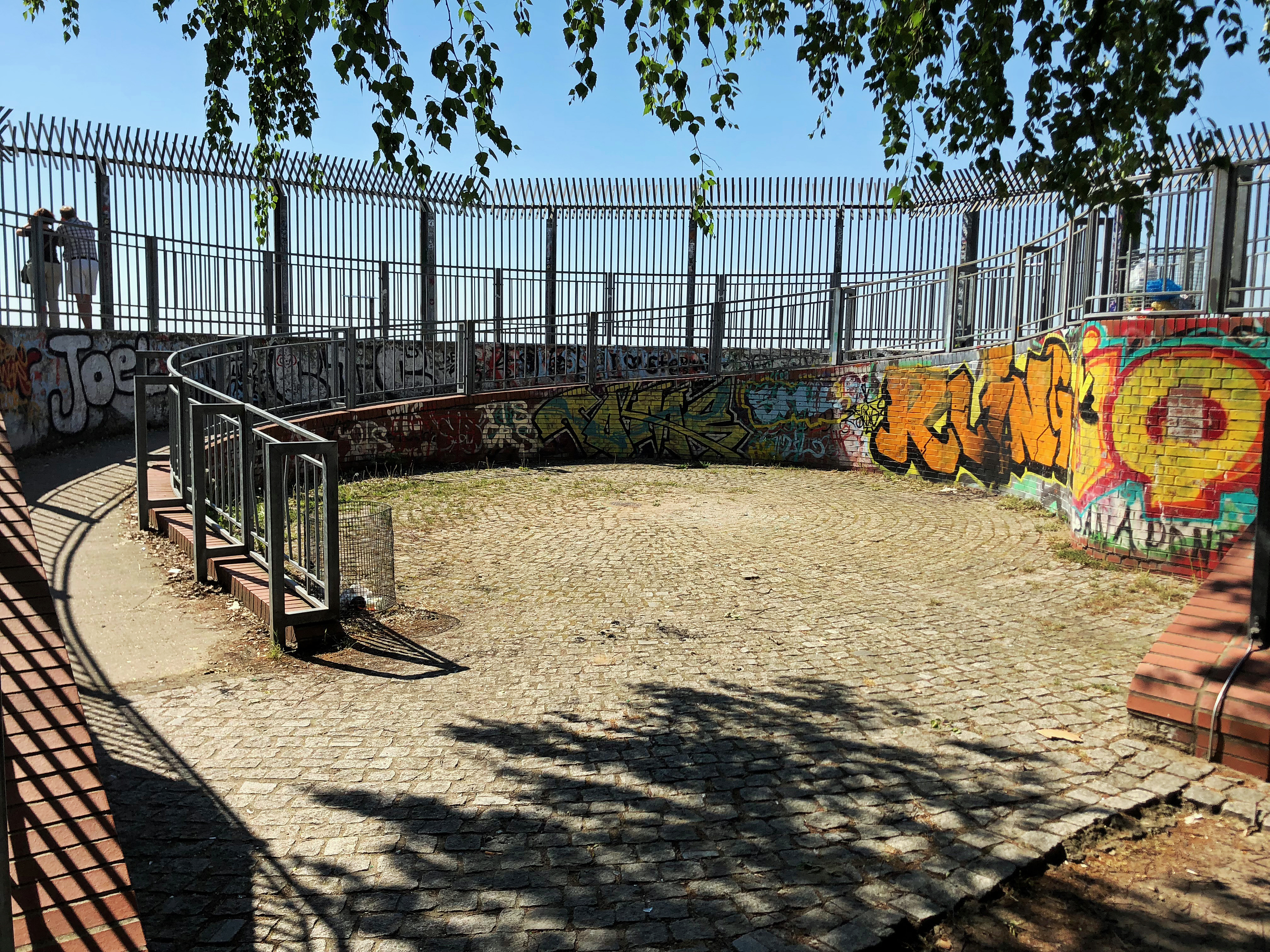
Observation platform on the flak tower roof

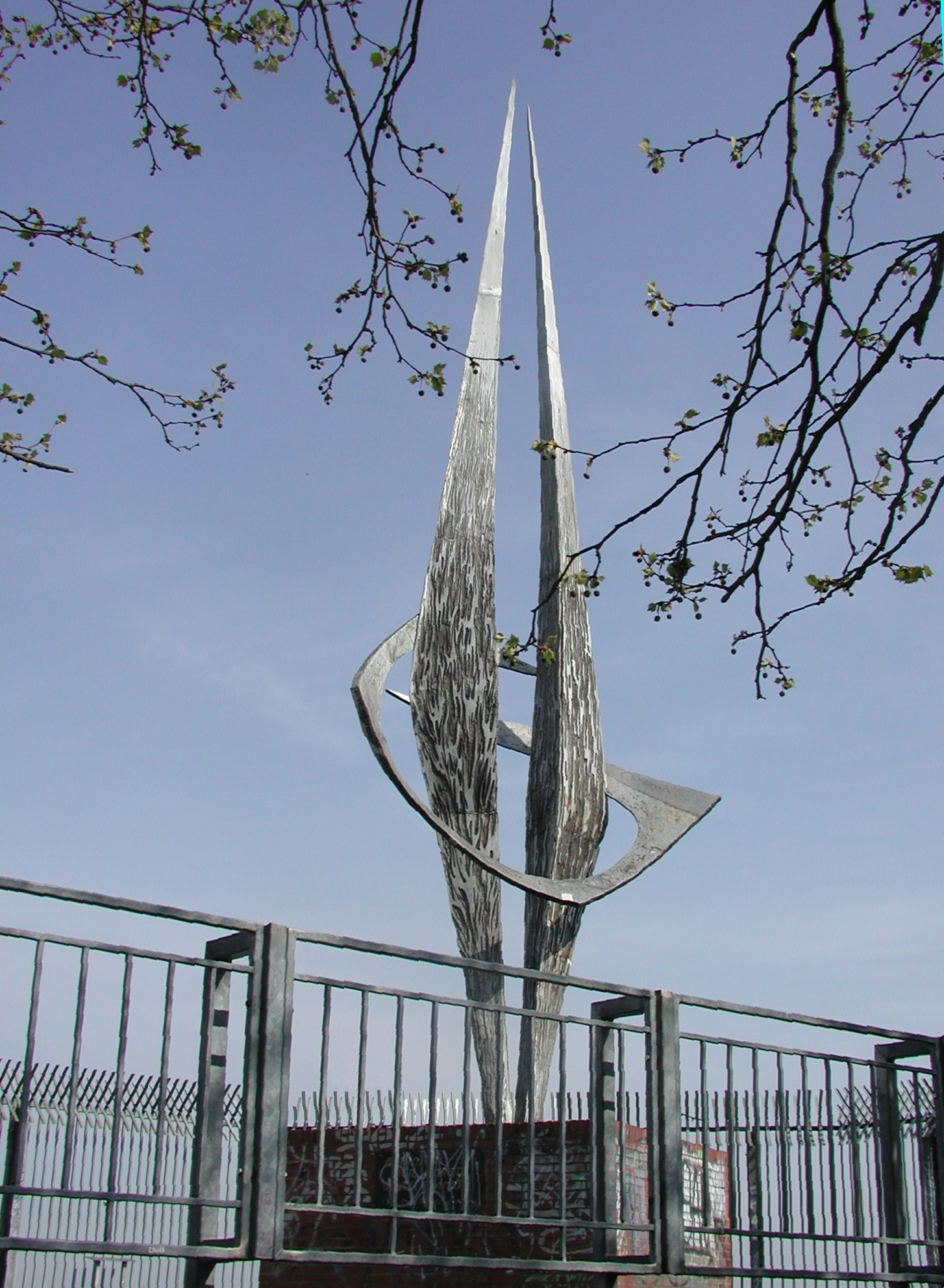
Memorial to the Unity of Germany on the roof

Humboldthöhe (English: Humboldt Hill) is an approximately 85 meters high rubble hill (German: Trümmerberg) in the Volkspark Humboldthain in the Gesundbrunnen district of Berlin. It was created after the Second World War by covering the partly demolished Humboldthain Flak Tower with debris. Today, Humboldthöhe serves as a recreational hill, viewpoint, and climbing site, while the surviving bunker structures are used for guided tours and as winter habitats for bats.

== History ==
During 1941–1942, the Wehrmacht constructed a large anti-aircraft tower complex in the Volkspark Humboldthain, consisting of a main flak tower with gun positions and a smaller command bunker.

After 1945 the Allies demanded demolition of such military structures. In December 1947 the smaller bunker was destroyed; in March 1948 French demolition crews twice blasted the larger tower. The two southern corner towers collapsed, while the two northern towers by the Berlin Ringbahn remained standing to avoid damage to the railway.

Between 1948 and 1951 the remains were covered with about 1.5 million cubic metres of rubble from destroyed buildings across Berlin, forming the present hill. A public competition produced the name "Humboldthöhe", and on 13 September 1952 the hill and redesigned park were formally opened.

On the roof of the remaining structure stands the 11 meters aluminium sculpture Mahnmal der Einheit Deutschlands (English: Memorial to the Unity of Germany), by Arnold Schatz, installed in 1967.

== Present use ==
The summit of Humboldthöhe can be reached by a staircase of 163 steps or a winding path following the former debris railway line. The bunker walls are used as climbing routes by the German Alpine Club.

Since October 2003, guided tours have been offered highlighting wartime history and post-war use. They are paused during winter months to protect hibernating bats.

The hill is one of Berlin's largest winter habitats for bats, with several hundred animals of different species recorded.

== See also ==
- List of hills in Berlin
