= List of hills of Berlin =

This list of hills of Berlin includes the main high points located in the German state of Berlin arranged alphabetically.

== A ==
- Ahrensfelder Berge

== B ==
- Biesdorfer Höhe
- Böttcherberg

== D ==
- Dörferblick

== E ==
- Ehrenpfortenberg

== F ==
- Falkenberg
- Fichtenberg

== G ==
- Großer Bunkerberg
- Großer Müggelberg

== H ==
- Hahneberg
- Havelberg
- Heinersdorfer Berg
- Humboldthöhe

== I ==
- Insulaner

== K ==
- Karlsberg
- Kienberg
- Kreuzberg

== M ==
- Marienhöhe
- Müggelberge

== O ==
- Oderbruchkippe

== R ==
- Rauenberg
- Rixdorfer Höhe
- Rudower Höhe

== S ==
- Schäferberg
- Seddinberg
- Stener Berg

== T ==
- Teufelsberg

== W ==
- Windmühlenberg
