= Volkspark Humboldthain =

Park in Berlin, Germany

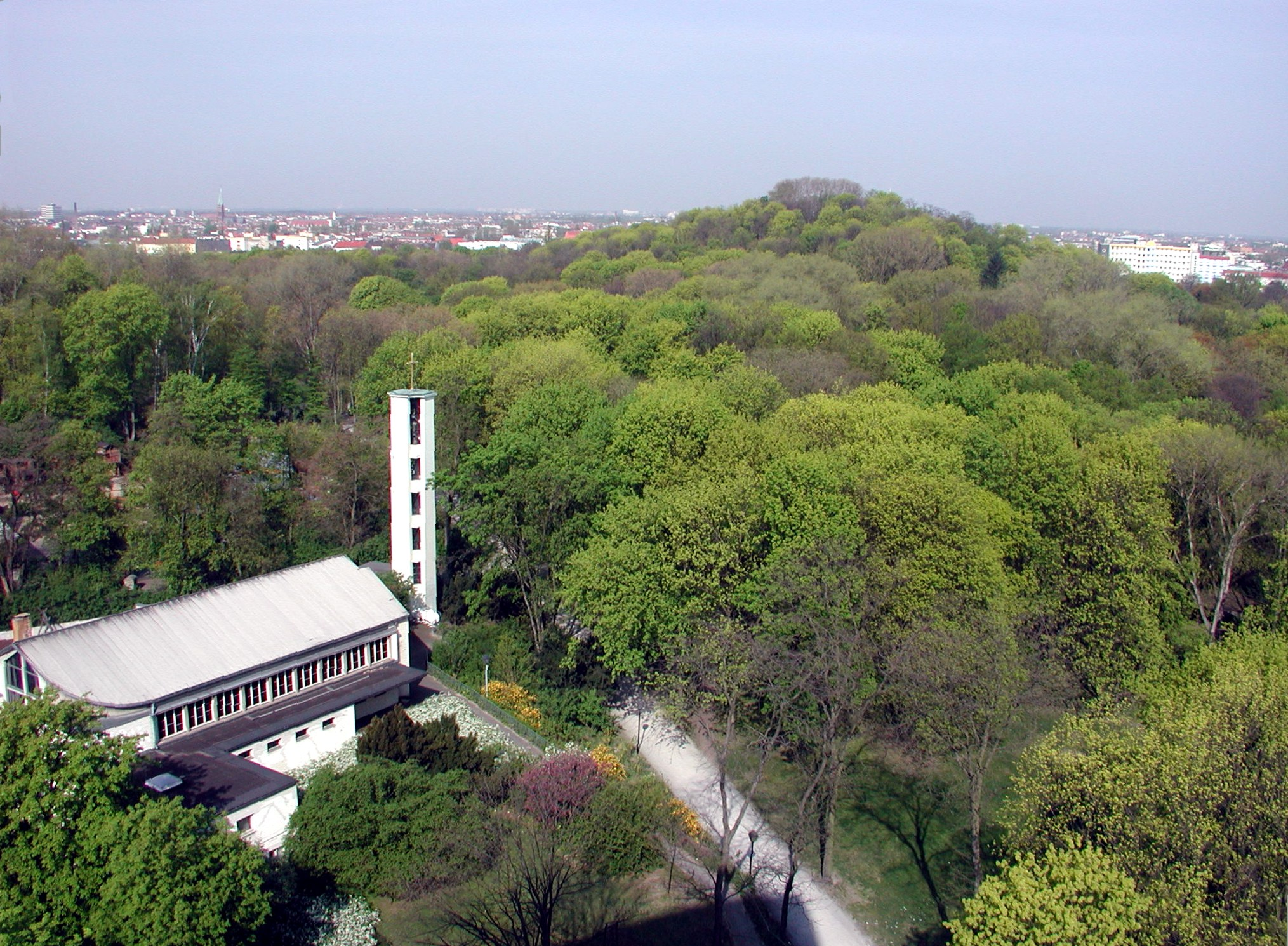
- View of Humboldthöhe (rubble hill) in the park

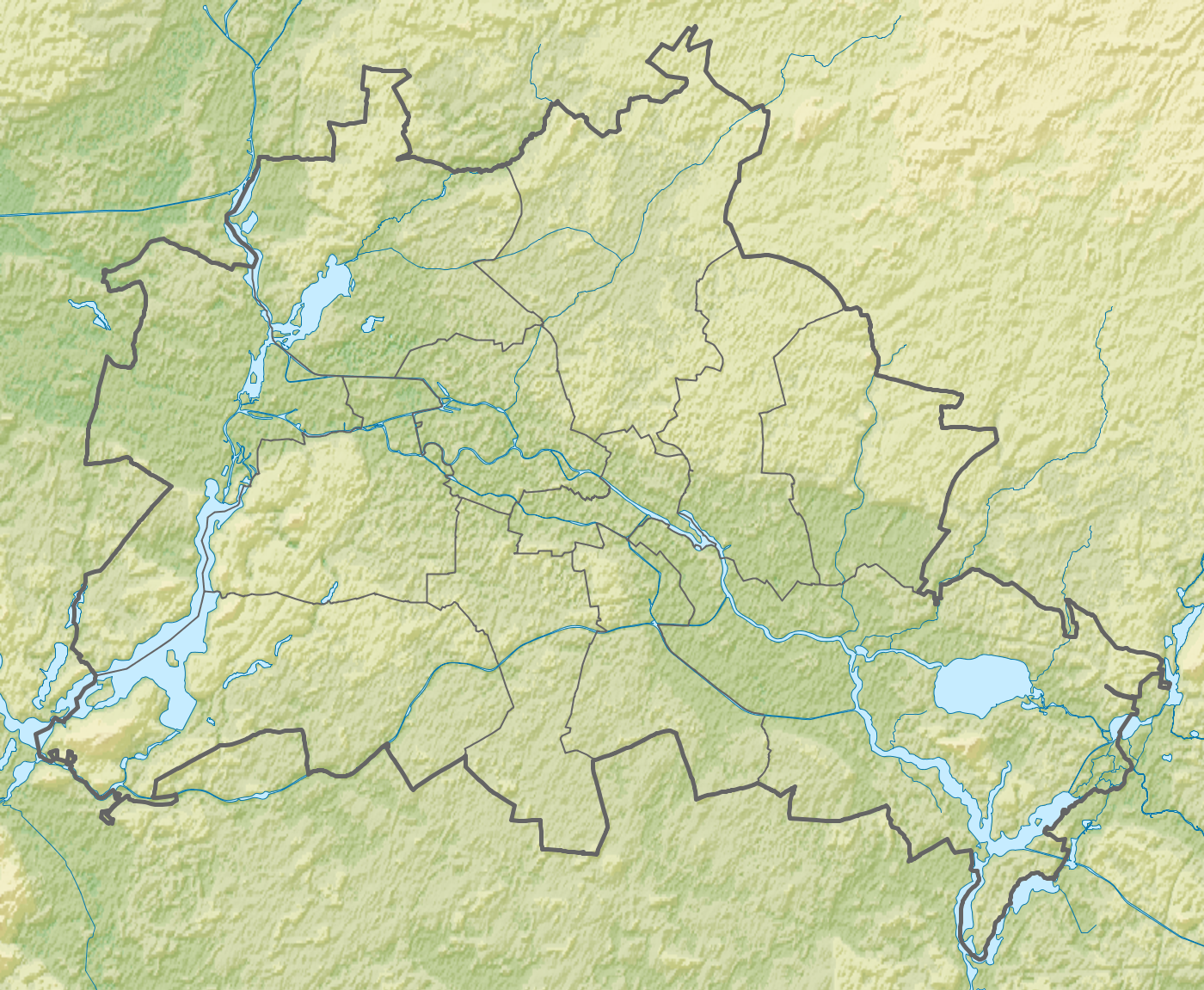
- Location within Berlin
- Type: Public park
- Location: Gesundbrunnen, Mitte, Berlin, Germany
- Coordinates: 52°32′50″N 13°23′06″E
- Area: 29 hectares (72 acres)
- Created: 1869–1876
- Designer: Gustav Meyer
- Operator: District of Mitte
- Status: Open all year
- Website: www.visitberlin.de/en/humboldthain-park

Volkspark Humboldthain is a public park in the Gesundbrunnen neighborhood of Berlin, Germany. The landscape park covers 29 hectares and was created between 1869 and 1876. It is notable both for its 19th-century design by landscape architect Gustav Meyer and for the remains of a World War II Flak tower integrated into the terrain as the rubble hill Humboldthöhe.

== History ==
=== Foundation and design ===
Work on the park began on 14 September 1869, the centenary of Alexander von Humboldt's birth; completion followed in 1876. The original concept by city garden director Gustav Meyer combined broad lawns, educational plantings and promenades typical of Berlin's 19th-century Volksparks.

=== World War II and rubble landscape ===
Between October 1941 and April 1942, heavy flak structures (combat and command towers) were constructed in the park as part of Berlin's air-defense network. Building was around the clock with up to 3,200 workers, including foreign laborers and POWs. After 1945, the command tower was demolished and buried; the northern tower was only partially demolished (nearby rail lines limited blasting). The site was reshaped with large volumes of rubble to form today's Humboldthöhe. Contemporary reporting also recounts the postwar blasting attempts and their limits.

From the late 1940s to early 1950s the grounds were reconstructed as a public park. A formal rose garden (Rosengarten) was laid out on the former church site and remains a key feature of the southern section.

=== Recent decades ===
Informal urban explorers dug their way in and noted a fatal fall inside the Humboldthain bunker in 1982, underscoring why access today is controlled and guided. In the early 2000s, blocked passages were cleared and routes were secured inside the Humboldthain tower. Guided visits have since run seasonally, typically April–October; three of the tower’s seven floors are shown, after volunteers removed over 1,400 m³ of debris across 8,000+ hours of work, with helmets required and a 90-minute route designed to avoid disturbing hibernating bats.

== Features ==
- Bat hibernation site: The interior hosts several bat species in winter; it is one of Berlin's larger winter shelters for bats.
- Bunker tours: Regular guided visits to multiple levels of the flak structure.
- Humboldthain Club: In May 2013, the Club opened inside the station building at Hochstraße 46, next to the park. Operator Constantin Boese launched the venue with a four-day opening party on the second weekend of May.
- Humboldthöhe: Rubble hill incorporating remains of the northern flak tower; the tower was left standing in part to protect nearby rail lines during demolition.
- Climbing walls: The outer bunker walls are used as a sport-climbing facility operated by the German Alpine Club (DAV).
- Rosengarten: A formal rose garden; around 15,000 roses are arranged in box-edged beds and pergolas.
- Sommerbad Humboldthain: Outdoor pool complex with a 50 meter pool, slide, paddling pool and sunbathing lawns.

== Conservation ==
The park is treated as a historic garden monument within Berlin's inventory of protected green spaces and is maintained by the district of Mitte.

== Access ==
The park borders the Berlin Gesundbrunnen station (S- and long-distance rail), and is also served by local bus routes.

== Gallery ==
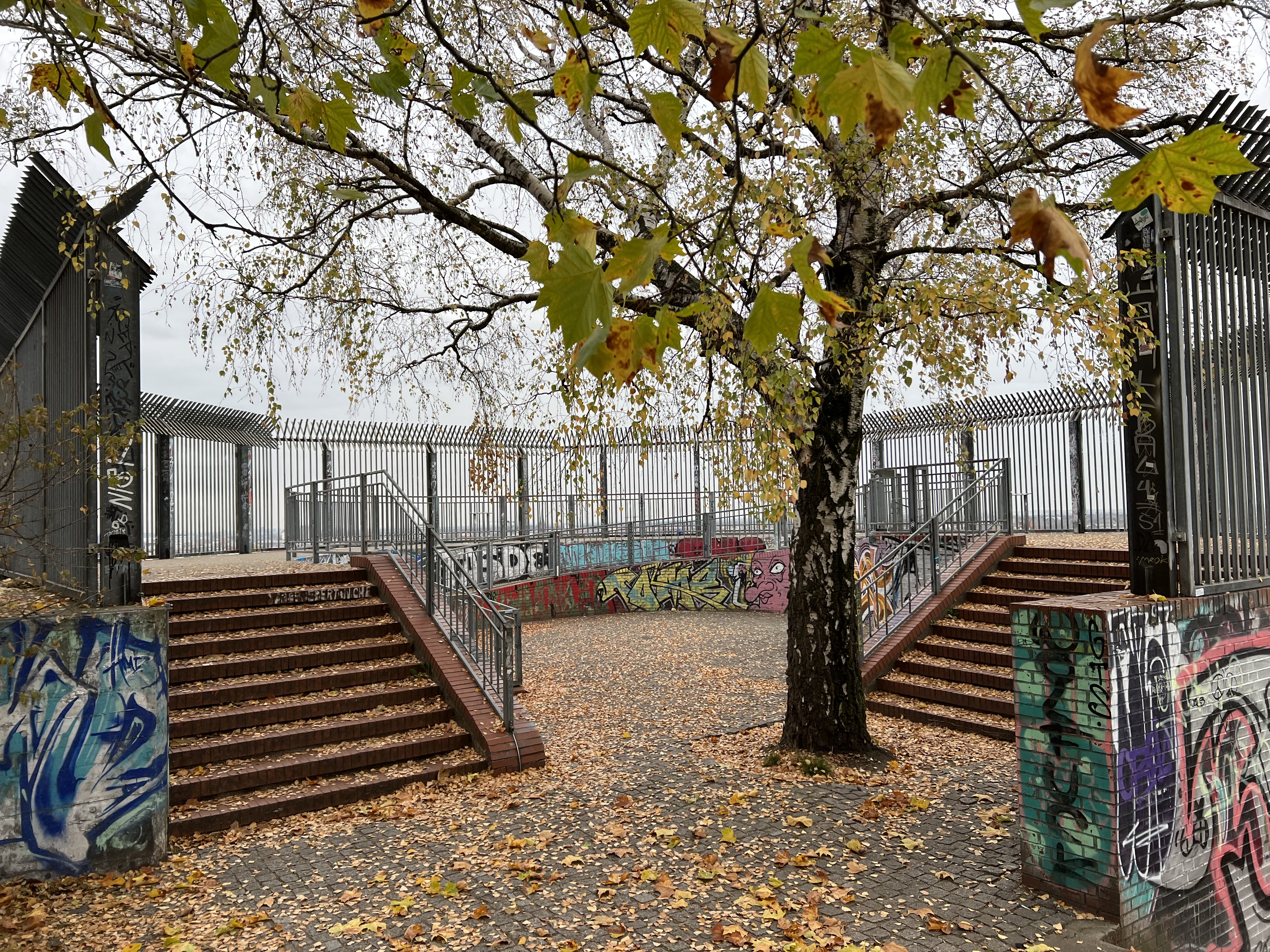
Stairway area leading up to the flak-tower remains.

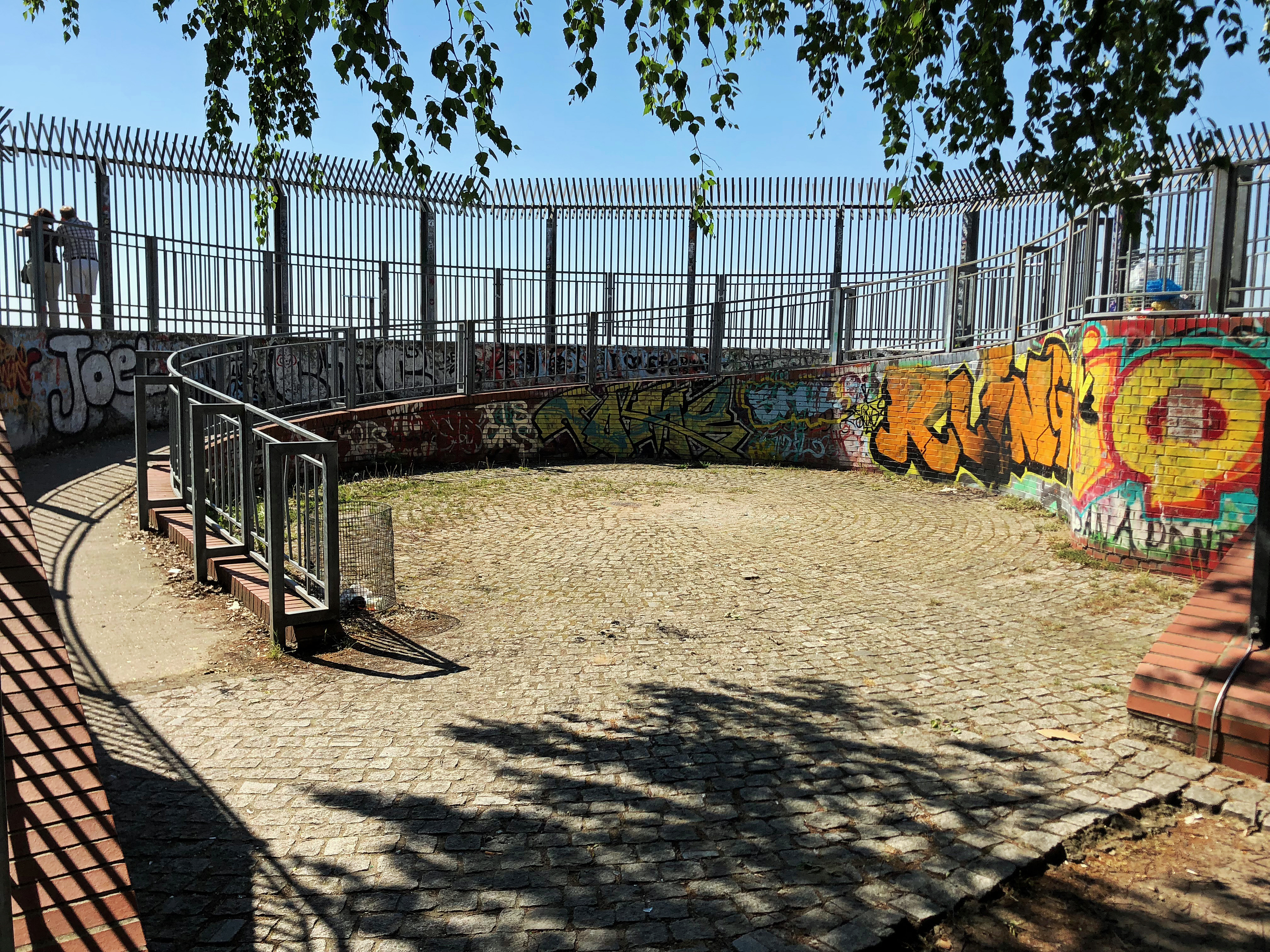
Observation platform on the bunker roof.

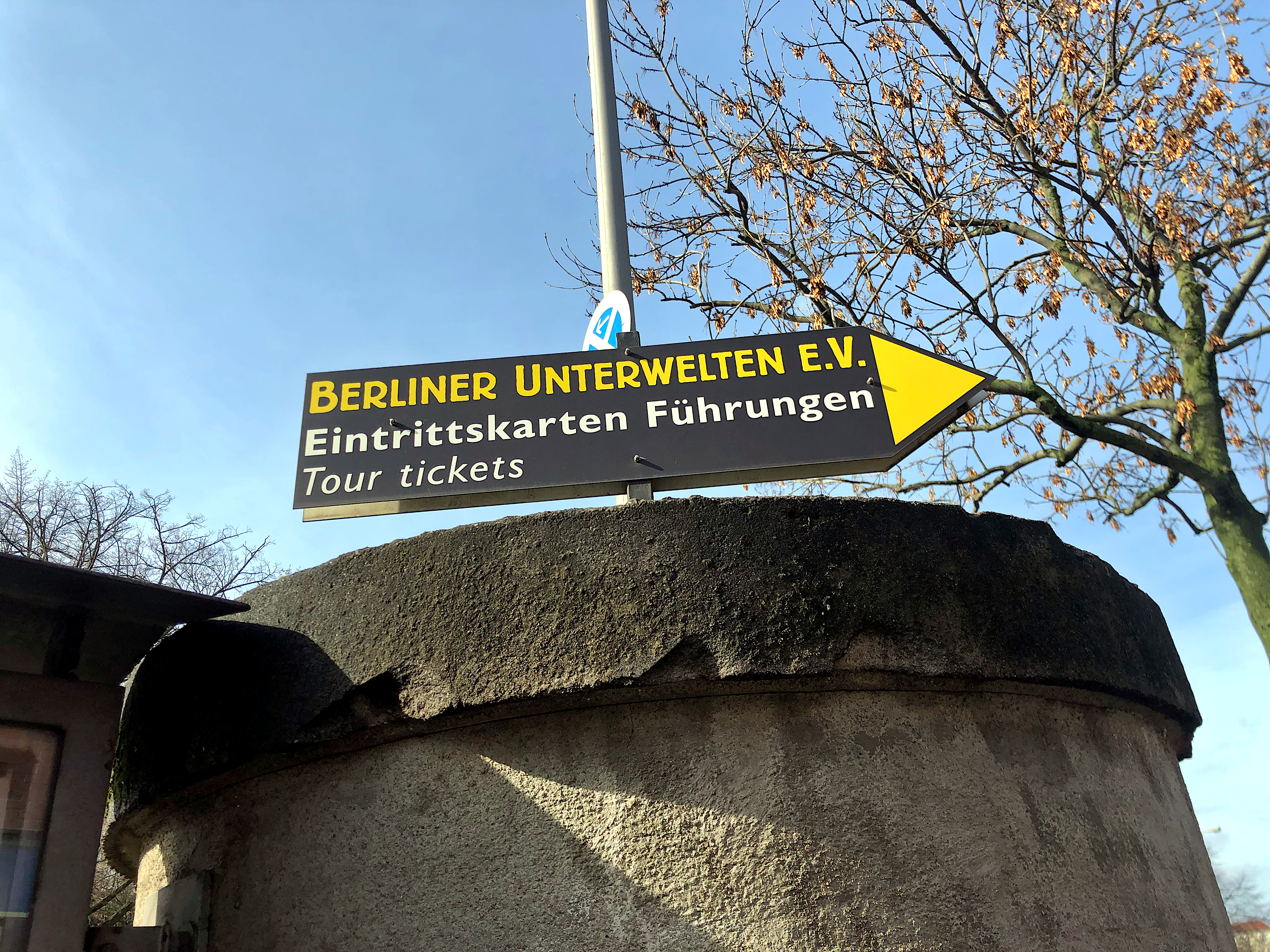
Exhibitions and tours (Berliner Unterwelten).

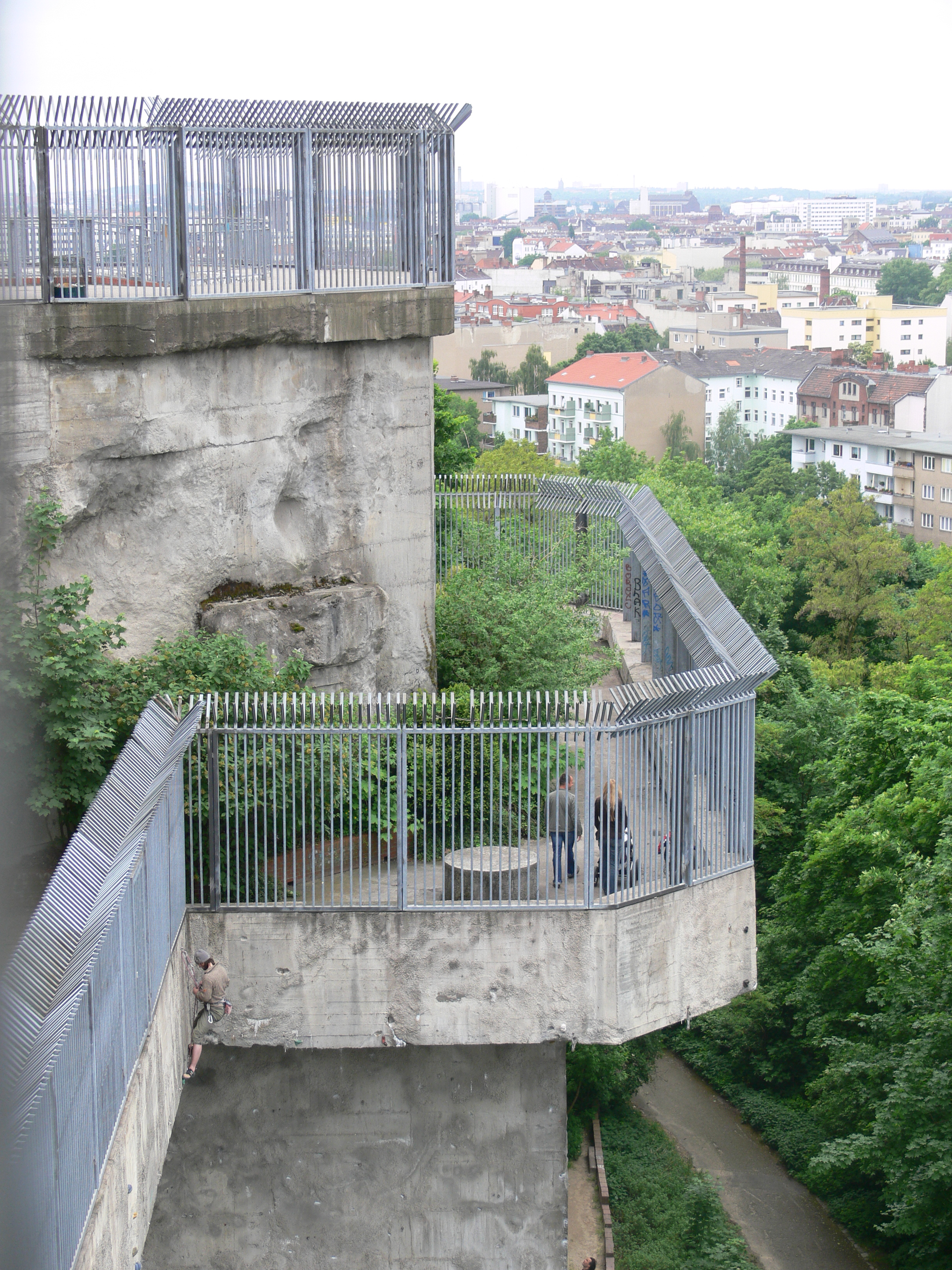
North face of the flak tower.

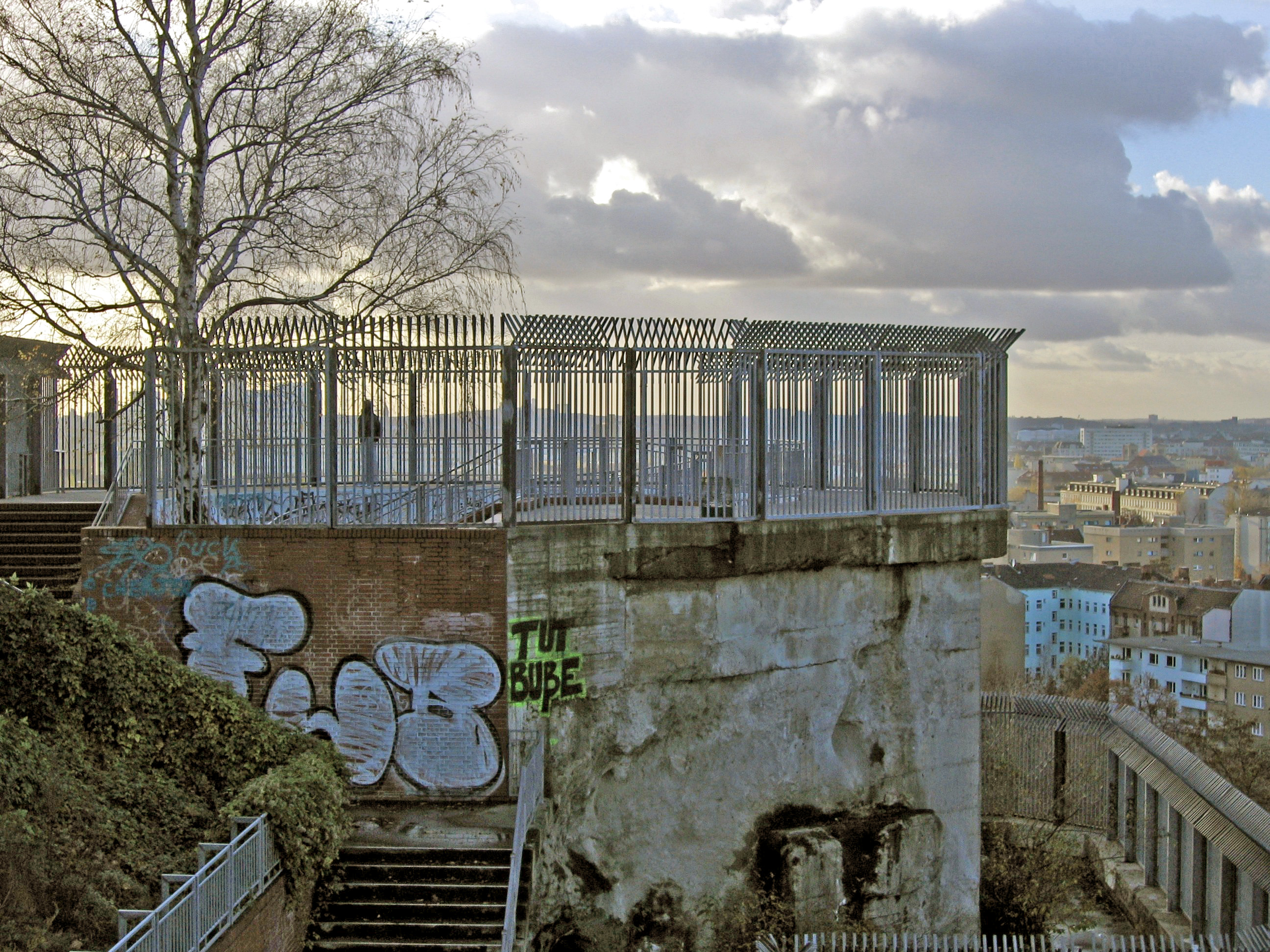
Park view near the bunker walls.

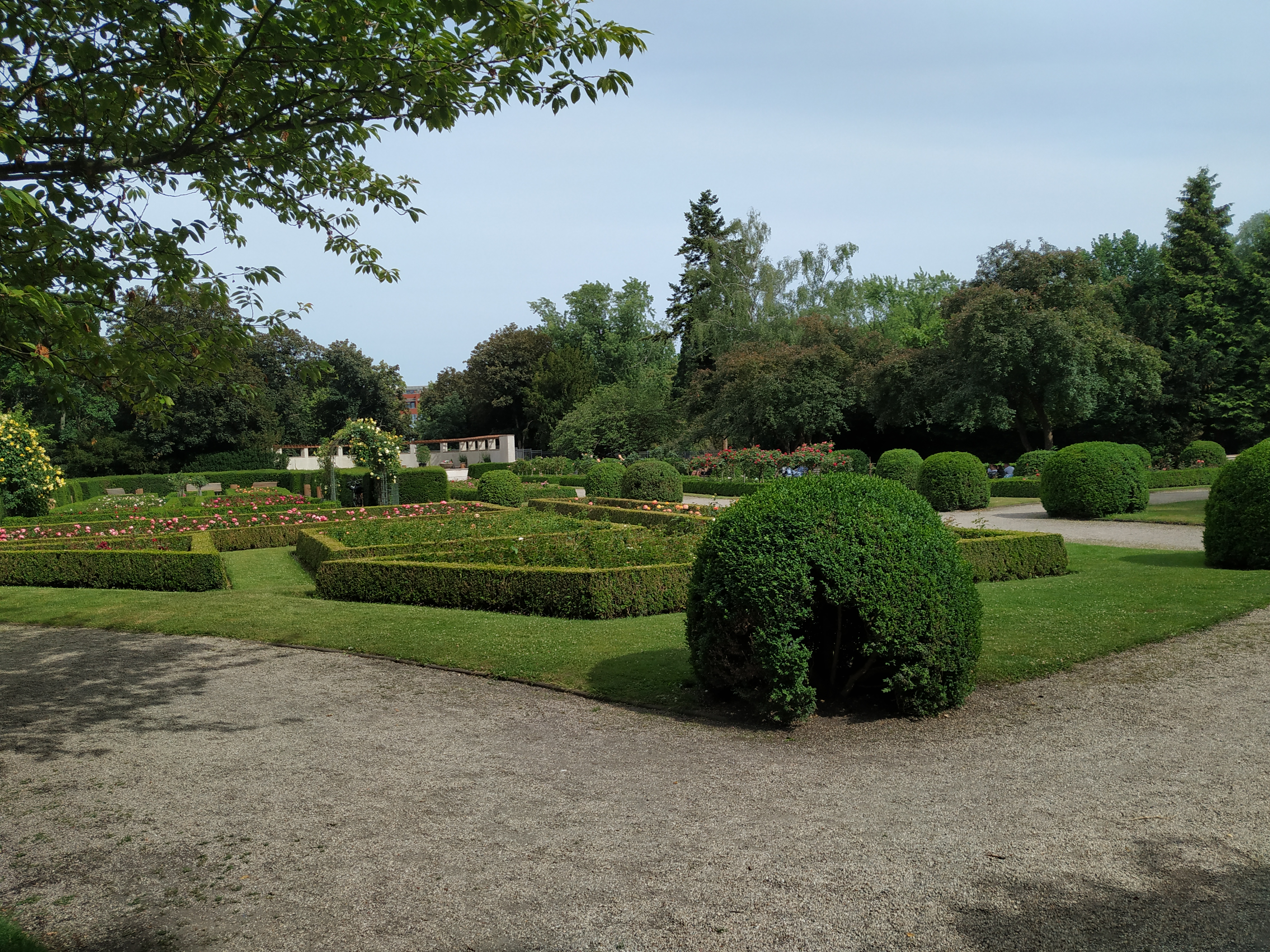
Rosengarten (formal rose garden).

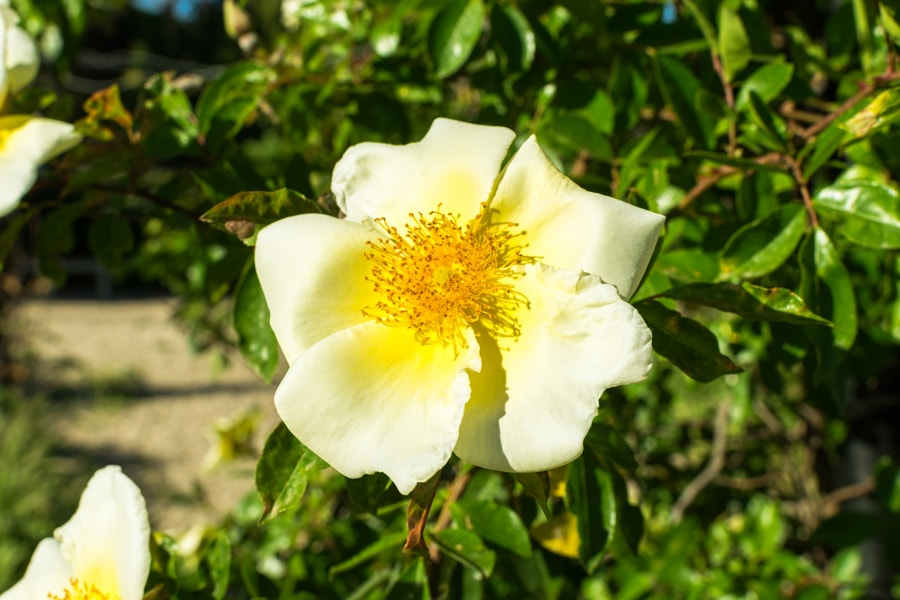
Rosengarten beds and pergolas.

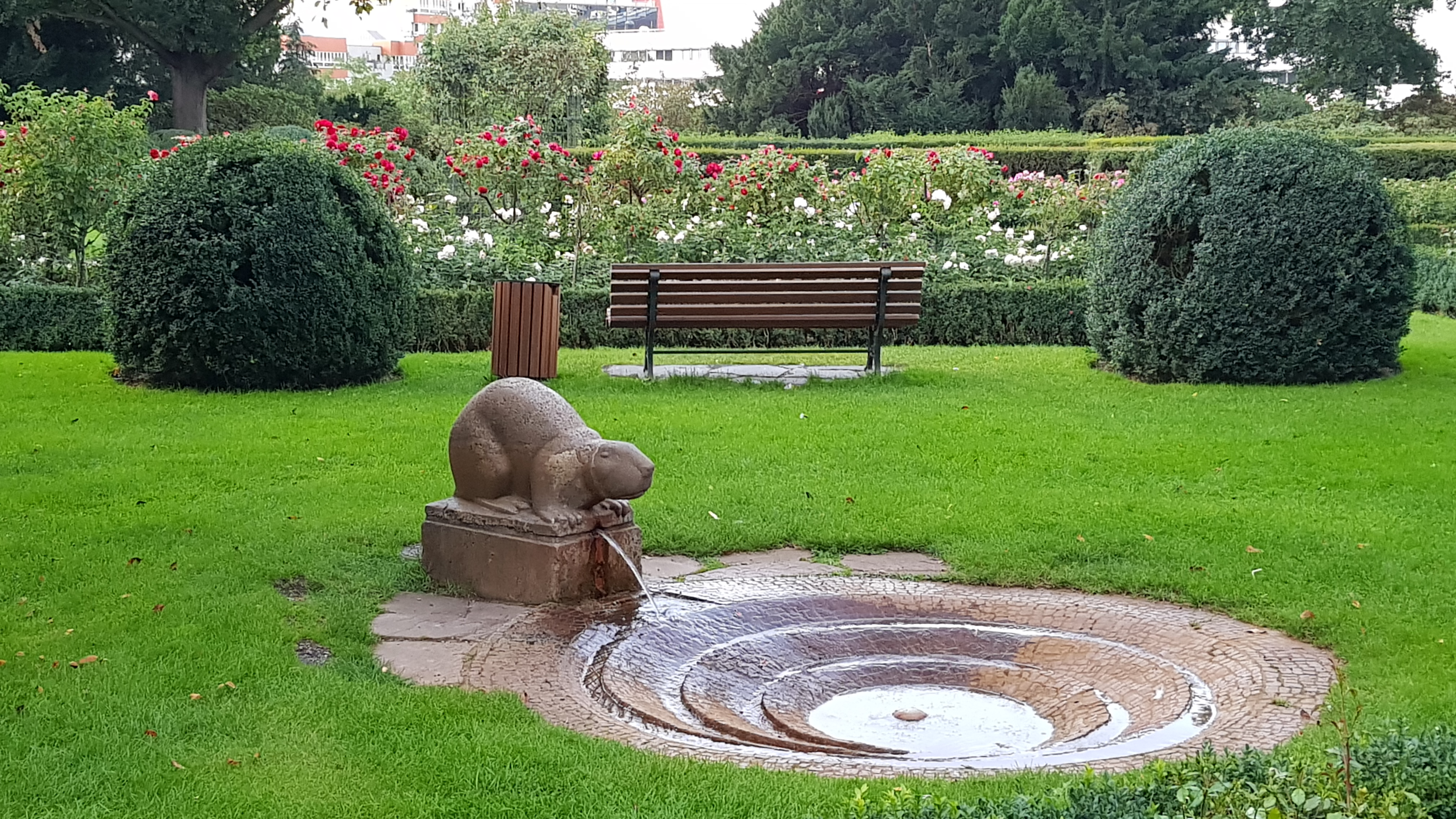
Bieberbrunnen in the rose garden.

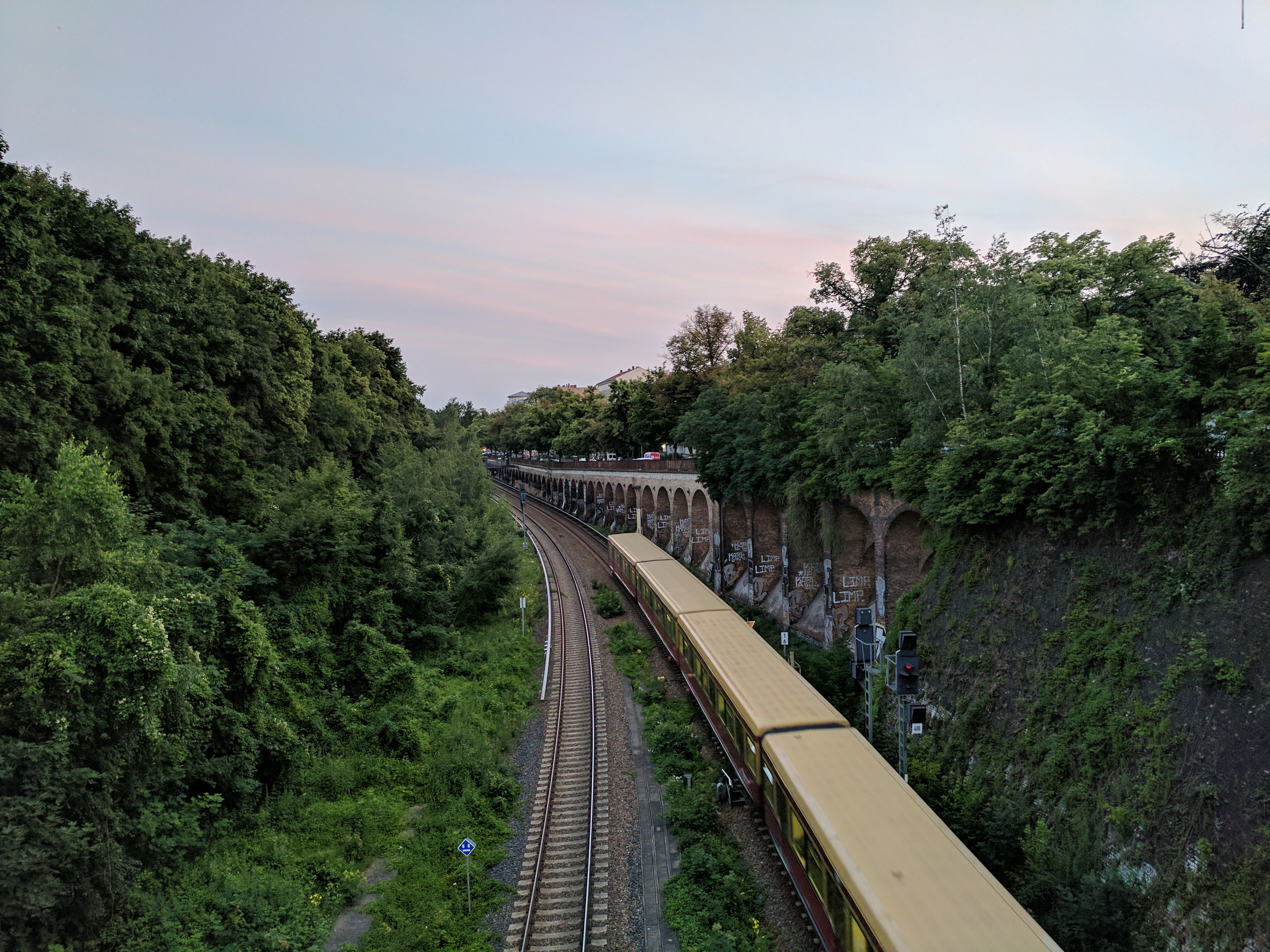
S-Bahn passing the park at Humboldthain.
