= Kościuszki, Gmina Nowogard =

Kościuszki
- Village
- Location within Poland
- Coordinates: 53°38′47″N 15°3′29″E
- Country: Poland
- Voivodeship: West Pomeranian
- County: Goleniów
- Gmina: Nowogard

Kościuszki [kɔɕˈt͡ɕuʂki] (German: Hindenburg) is a village in the administrative district of Gmina Nowogard, within Goleniów County, West Pomeranian Voivodeship, in north-western Poland. It lies approximately 5 km (3 mi) south-west of Nowogard, 20 km (12 mi) north-east of Goleniów, and 41 km (25 mi) north-east of the regional capital Szczecin.

For the history of the region, see history of Pomerania.
