= Wierzbięcin =

Wierzbięcin may refer to the following places:

- Wierzbięcin, Lubusz Voivodeship (west Poland)
- Wierzbięcin, Pomeranian Voivodeship (north Poland)
- Wierzbięcin, Warmian-Masurian Voivodeship (north Poland)
- Wierzbięcin, West Pomeranian Voivodeship (north-west Poland)
