= Strzelewo, West Pomeranian Voivodeship =

Strzelewo
- Village
- Location within Poland
- Coordinates: 53°40′49″N 15°0′5″E
- Country: Poland
- Voivodeship: West Pomeranian
- County: Goleniów
- Gmina: Nowogard

Strzelewo [stʂɛˈlɛvɔ] (German: Strelowhagen) is a village in the administrative district of Gmina Nowogard, within Goleniów County, West Pomeranian Voivodeship, in north-western Poland. It lies approximately 8 km (5 mi) west of Nowogard, 19 km (12 mi) north-east of Goleniów, and 41 km (25 mi) north-east of the regional capital Szczecin.

For the history of the region, see history of Pomerania.
