= Bromierz, West Pomeranian Voivodeship =

Bromierz
- Village
- Location within Poland
- Coordinates: 53°35′54″N 15°10′53″E
- Country: Poland
- Voivodeship: West Pomeranian
- County: Goleniów
- Gmina: Nowogard

Bromierz [ˈbrɔmjɛʂ] is a village in the administrative district of Gmina Nowogard, within Goleniów County, West Pomeranian Voivodeship, in north-western Poland. It lies approximately 9 km (6 mi) south-east of Nowogard, 25 km (16 mi) east of Goleniów, and 45 km (28 mi) north-east of the regional capital Szczecin.
