= Trzechel =

- Village
- Location within Poland
- Coordinates: 53°43′56″N 14°57′54″E
- Country: Poland
- Voivodeship: West Pomeranian
- County: Goleniów
- Gmina: Nowogard

Trzechel [ˈtʂɛxɛl] (German: Trechel) is a village in the administrative district of Gmina Nowogard, within Goleniów County, West Pomeranian Voivodeship, in north-western Poland. It lies approximately 13 km (8 mi) north-west of Nowogard, 23 km (14 mi) north-east of Goleniów, and 44 km (27 mi) north-east of the regional capital Szczecin.

For the history of the region, see history of Pomerania.
