= Ostrzyca, West Pomeranian Voivodeship =

Ostrzyca
- Village
- Location within Poland
- Coordinates: 53°36′40″N 15°10′54″E
- Country: Poland
- Voivodeship: West Pomeranian
- County: Goleniów
- Gmina: Nowogard
- Population: 350

Ostrzyca [ɔsˈtʂɨt͡sa] (German: Bernhagen) is a village in the administrative district of Gmina Nowogard, within Goleniów County, West Pomeranian Voivodeship, in northwestern Poland. It lies approximately 8 km (5 mi) south-east of Nowogard, 26 km (16 mi) east of Goleniów, and 46 km (29 mi) north-east of the regional capital Szczecin.

For the history of the region, see history of Pomerania.

The village has a population of 350.
