= Ptaszkowo, West Pomeranian Voivodeship =

Ptaszkowo
- Settlement
- Location within Poland
- Coordinates: 53°44′40″N 15°03′02″E
- Country: Poland
- Voivodeship: West Pomeranian
- County: Goleniów
- Gmina: Nowogard

Ptaszkowo [ptaʂˈkɔvɔ] (German: Hirschwalde) is a settlement in the administrative district of Gmina Nowogard, within Goleniów County, West Pomeranian Voivodeship, in north-western Poland. It lies approximately 12 kilometres (7 mi) north-west of Nowogard, 28 kilometres (17 mi) north-east of Goleniów, and 49 kilometres (30 mi) north-east of the regional capital Szczecin.

== Etymology ==
The settlement's former German name, Hirschwalde, derives from the German words Hirsch ("deer" or "stag") and Walde ("forest"), meaning "deer forest". The current Polish name Ptaszkowo derives from the Polish word ptak ("bird").

== History ==
The settlement formed part of the Duchy of Pomerania, ruled by the House of Griffin, during the medieval period. Following the Peace of Westphalia in 1648, the region came under Swedish control until the Treaty of Stockholm in 1720, when Sweden ceded its possessions south of the Peene River, including the Naugard area, to the Kingdom of Prussia.

Under Prussian and later German administration, Hirschwalde was classified as a Häusergruppe (group of houses) in Kreis Naugard, within the Regierungsbezirk Stettin of the Province of Pomerania. The settlement was administratively dependent on the nearby village of Friedrichsberg, which served as a Dorf und Rittergut (village and landed estate) and housed the local Standesamt (civil registry office). With the unification of Germany in 1871, the area became part of the German Empire.

During World War II, the Nazis operated forced labour camps and a youth prison in the nearby town of Naugard, where labourers of various nationalities—predominantly French and African POWs—were interned. In March 1945, the area was captured by Soviet and Polish forces during the East Pomeranian Offensive, which left up to 60 percent of Naugard destroyed. Following Nazi Germany's defeat, the region was transferred to Poland under the terms of the Potsdam Agreement, and the German population was expelled. The settlement was subsequently resettled with Poles and renamed Ptaszkowo. The first new Polish settlers included freed forced labourers who had been imprisoned in the area during the war.
