= Struga, West Pomeranian Voivodeship =

Struga
- Village
- Location within Poland
- Coordinates: 53°46′17″N 15°8′15″E
- Country: Poland
- Voivodeship: West Pomeranian
- County: Goleniów
- Gmina: Nowogard

Struga [ˈstruɡa] (German: Wilkenfelde) is a village in the administrative district of Gmina Nowogard, within Goleniów County, West Pomeranian Voivodeship, in north-western Poland. It lies approximately 12 km (7 mi) north of Nowogard, 33 km (21 mi) north-east of Goleniów, and 54 km (34 mi) north-east of the regional capital Szczecin.

For the history of the region, see history of Pomerania.
