= Żabówko =

- Village
- Location within Poland
- Coordinates: 53°43′13″N 15°12′19″E
- Country: Poland
- Voivodeship: West Pomeranian
- County: Goleniów
- Gmina: Nowogard

Żabówko [ʐaˈbufkɔ] (German: Klein Sabow) is a village in the administrative district of Gmina Nowogard, within Goleniów County, West Pomeranian Voivodeship, in north-western Poland. It lies approximately 9 km (6 mi) north-east of Nowogard, 32 km (20 mi) north-east of Goleniów, and 54 km (34 mi) north-east of the regional capital Szczecin.

== See also ==
- History of Pomerania
