= Boguszyce, Goleniów County =

Boguszyce
- Village
- Location within Poland
- Coordinates: 53°44′50″N 15°10′30″E
- Country: Poland
- Voivodeship: West Pomeranian
- County: Goleniów
- Gmina: Nowogard

Boguszyce [bɔɡuˈʂɨt͡sɛ] is a village in the administrative district of Gmina Nowogard, within Goleniów County, West Pomeranian Voivodeship, in north-western Poland. It lies approximately 10 km (6 mi) north-east of Nowogard, 33 km (21 mi) north-east of Goleniów, and 54 km (34 mi) north-east of the regional capital Szczecin.
