= Kulice, West Pomeranian Voivodeship =

Kulice
- Village
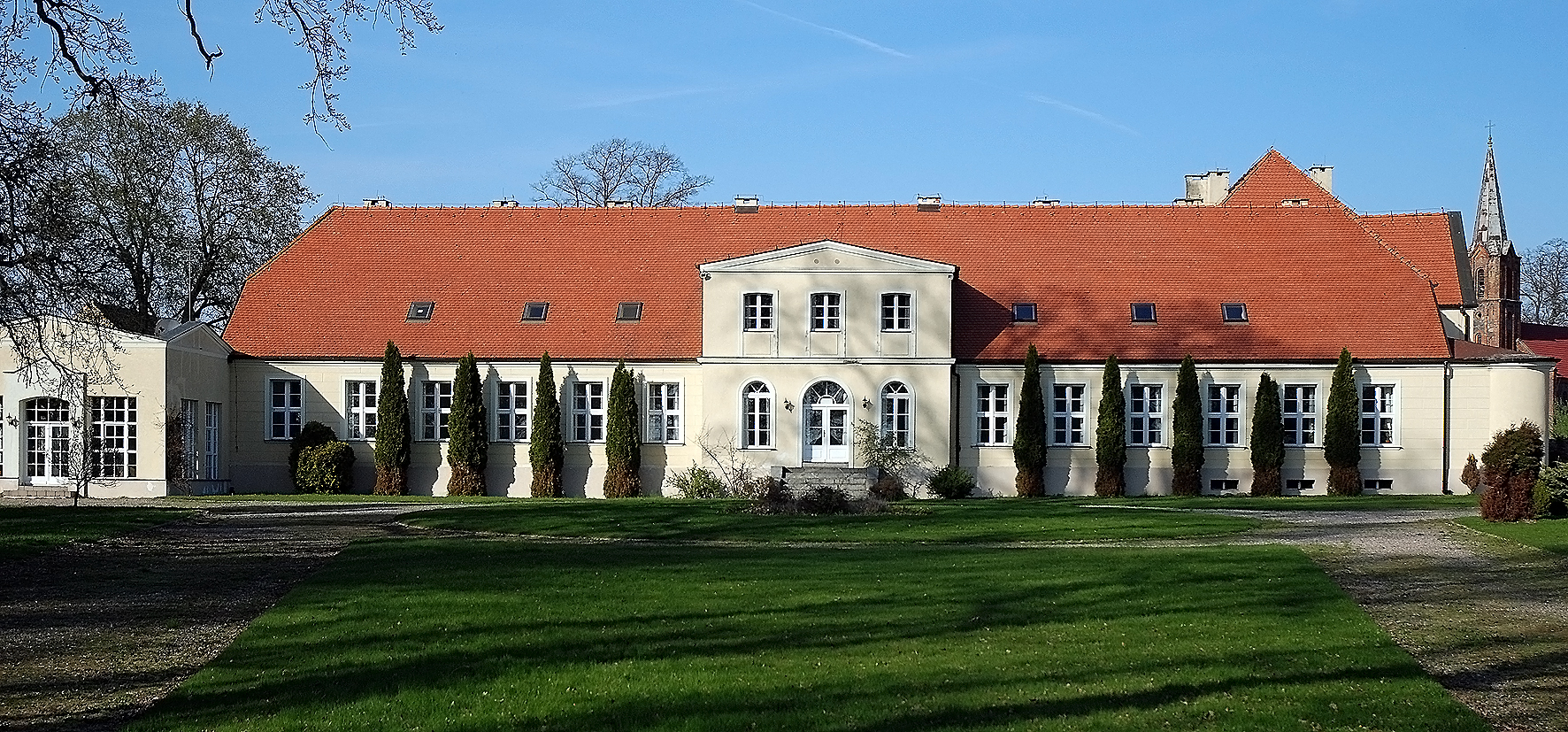
- Manor house

- Location within Poland
- Coordinates: 53°39′42″N 15°11′3″E
- Country: Poland
- Voivodeship: West Pomeranian
- County: Goleniów
- Gmina: Nowogard
- Time zone: UTC+1 (CET)
  - Summer (DST): UTC+2 (CEST)
- Vehicle registration: ZGL

Kulice [kuˈlit͡sɛ] is a village in the administrative district of Gmina Nowogard, within Goleniów County, West Pomeranian Voivodeship, in north-western Poland. It lies approximately 5 km (3 mi) east of Nowogard, 28 km (17 mi) north-east of Goleniów, and 49 km (30 mi) north-east of the regional capital Szczecin.

== History ==
The region became part of the emerging Polish state under its first historic ruler Mieszko I around 967. Following the fragmentation of Poland, it was part of the Duchy of Pomerania. In the 18th century it became part of Prussia, and from 1871 to 1945 it was also part of Germany. The village contains a manor-house which belonged to the family of German statesman Otto von Bismarck.

During World War II, in the village, the Germans operated a forced labour subcamp of the prison in Goleniów. After the defeat of Nazi Germany in the war, in 1945, the village became again part of Poland.

In 1994/95 the manor-house was refurbished by the European Academy Külz-Kulice Foundation, which was founded by Philipp von Bismarck. In 2002 the University of Szczecin acquired the manor-house and established a conference centre in cooperation with Bismarck's European Academy. The University revoked the cooperation in 2012 and ceased the project.
