= Otręby, West Pomeranian Voivodeship =

Otręby
- Village
- Location within Poland
- Coordinates: 53°41′47″N 15°6′13″E
- Country: Poland
- Voivodeship: West Pomeranian
- County: Goleniów
- Gmina: Nowogard

Otręby [ɔˈtrɛmbɨ] (German: Schwingmühle) is a village in the administrative district of Gmina Nowogard, within Goleniów County, West Pomeranian Voivodeship, in north-western Poland. It lies approximately 4 km (2 mi) north of Nowogard, 25 km (16 mi) north-east of Goleniów, and 47 km (29 mi) north-east of the regional capital Szczecin.

For the history of the region, see history of Pomerania.
