= Długołęka, West Pomeranian Voivodeship =

Długołęka
- Village
- Location within Poland
- Coordinates: 53°37′11″N 15°6′47″E
- Country: Poland
- Voivodeship: West Pomeranian
- County: Goleniów
- Gmina: Nowogard

Długołęka (Polish: [dwuɡɔˈwɛŋka]; German: Langkafel) is a village in the administrative district of Gmina Nowogard, within Goleniów County, West Pomeranian Voivodeship, in north-western Poland. It lies approximately 6 km (4 mi) south of Nowogard, 22 km (14 mi) east of Goleniów, and 42 km (26 mi) north-east of the regional capital Szczecin.
