= Orzechowo (Nowogard) =

- Village
- Location within Poland
- Coordinates: 53°44′38″N 15°7′57″E
- Country: Poland
- Voivodeship: West Pomeranian
- County: Goleniów
- Gmina: Nowogard

Orzechowo [ɔʐɛˈxɔvɔ] (German: Düsterbeck) is a village in the administrative district of Gmina Nowogard, within Goleniów County, West Pomeranian Voivodeship, in north-western Poland. It lies approximately 9 km (6 mi) north of Nowogard, 30 km (19 mi) north-east of Goleniów, and 52 km (32 mi) north-east of the regional capital Szczecin.

For the history of the region, see history of Pomerania.
