= Bieniczki =

- Village
- Location within Poland
- Coordinates: 53°38′28″N 15°16′40″E
- Country: Poland
- Voivodeship: West Pomeranian
- County: Goleniów
- Gmina: Nowogard
- Population: 160

Bieniczki [bjɛˈnit͡ʂki] (German: Klein Benz) is a village in the administrative district of Gmina Nowogard, within Goleniów County, West Pomeranian Voivodeship, in north-western Poland. It lies approximately 12 km (7 mi) east of Nowogard, 33 km (21 mi) east of Goleniów, and 53 km (33 mi) north-east of the regional capital Szczecin.

The village has a population of 160.
