= Zagórz, West Pomeranian Voivodeship =

Zagórz
- Village
- Location within Poland
- Coordinates: 53°47′7″N 15°5′16″E
- Country: Poland
- Voivodeship: West Pomeranian
- County: Goleniów
- Gmina: Nowogard
- Time zone: UTC+1 (CET)
  - Summer (DST): UTC+2 (CEST)
- Vehicle registration: ZGL

Zagórz [ˈzaɡuʂ] (German: Sagersberg) is a village in the administrative district of Gmina Nowogard, within Goleniów County, West Pomeranian Voivodeship, in north-western Poland. It lies approximately 14 km (9 mi) north of Nowogard, 32 km (20 mi) north-east of Goleniów, and 53 km (33 mi) north-east of the regional capital Szczecin.
