= Radłowo, West Pomeranian Voivodeship =

Radłowo
- Village
- Location within Poland
- Coordinates: 53°37′1″N 15°7′59″E
- Country: Poland
- Voivodeship: West Pomeranian
- County: Goleniów
- Gmina: Nowogard

Radłowo [raˈdwɔvɔ] (German: Radloffshof) is a village in the administrative district of Gmina Nowogard, within Goleniów County, West Pomeranian Voivodeship, in north-western Poland. It lies approximately 6 km (4 mi) south of Nowogard, 23 km (14 mi) east of Goleniów, and 43 km (27 mi) north-east of the regional capital Szczecin.

For the history of the region, see history of Pomerania.
