= Warnkowo =

- Village
- Location within Poland
- Coordinates: 53°40′58″N 15°5′35″E
- Country: Poland
- Voivodeship: West Pomeranian
- County: Goleniów
- Gmina: Nowogard

Warnkowo [varnˈkɔvɔ] (German: Warnekow) is a village in the administrative district of Gmina Nowogard, within Goleniów County, West Pomeranian Voivodeship, in north-western Poland. It lies approximately 3 km (2 mi) north-west of Nowogard, 24 km (15 mi) north-east of Goleniów, and 45 km (28 mi) north-east of the regional capital Szczecin.

For the history of the region, see history of Pomerania.
