= Sąpole =

- Village
- Location within Poland
- Coordinates: 53°39′31″N 15°10′38″E
- Country: Poland
- Voivodeship: West Pomeranian
- County: Goleniów
- Gmina: Nowogard

Sąpole [sɔmˈpɔlɛ] is a village in the administrative district of Gmina Nowogard, within Goleniów County, West Pomeranian Voivodeship, in north-western Poland. It lies approximately 5 km (3 mi) east of Nowogard, 27 km (17 mi) north-east of Goleniów, and 48 km (30 mi) north-east of the regional capital Szczecin.

For the history of the region, see history of Pomerania.
