= Sąpolnica =

- Village
- Location within Poland
- Coordinates: 53°37′6″N 15°9′19″E
- Country: Poland
- Voivodeship: West Pomeranian
- County: Goleniów
- Gmina: Nowogard

Sąpolnica [sɔmpɔlˈnit͡sa] (German: Zampelhagen) is a village in the administrative district of Gmina Nowogard, within Goleniów County, West Pomeranian Voivodeship, in north-western Poland. It lies approximately 6 km (4 mi) south-east of Nowogard, 24 km (15 mi) east of Goleniów, and 44 km (27 mi) north-east of the regional capital Szczecin. For the history of the region, see history of Pomerania.
