= Grabin, West Pomeranian Voivodeship =

Grabin
- Village
- Location within Poland
- Coordinates: 53°45′30″N 15°2′42″E
- Country: Poland
- Voivodeship: West Pomeranian
- County: Goleniów
- Gmina: Nowogard

Grabin [ˈɡrabin] is a village in the administrative district of Gmina Nowogard, within Goleniów County, West Pomeranian Voivodeship, in north-western Poland. It lies approximately 12 km (7 mi) north-west of Nowogard, 28 km (17 mi) north-east of Goleniów, and 49 km (30 mi) north-east of the regional capital Szczecin.
