= Glicko, Goleniów County =

Glicko
- Village
- Location within Poland
- Coordinates: 53°44′5″N 15°6′3″E
- Country: Poland
- Voivodeship: West Pomeranian
- County: Goleniów
- Gmina: Nowogard

Glicko [ˈɡlit͡skɔ] (German: Glietzig) is a village in the administrative district of Gmina Nowogard, within Goleniów County, West Pomeranian Voivodeship, in north-western Poland. It lies approximately 8 km (5 mi) north of Nowogard, 28 km (17 mi) north-east of Goleniów, and 50 km (31 mi) north-east of the regional capital Szczecin. Glicko was a contested territory and was formally a part of Germany through World War II, but separated, becoming part of Poland in 1945.
