= Słajsino =

- Village
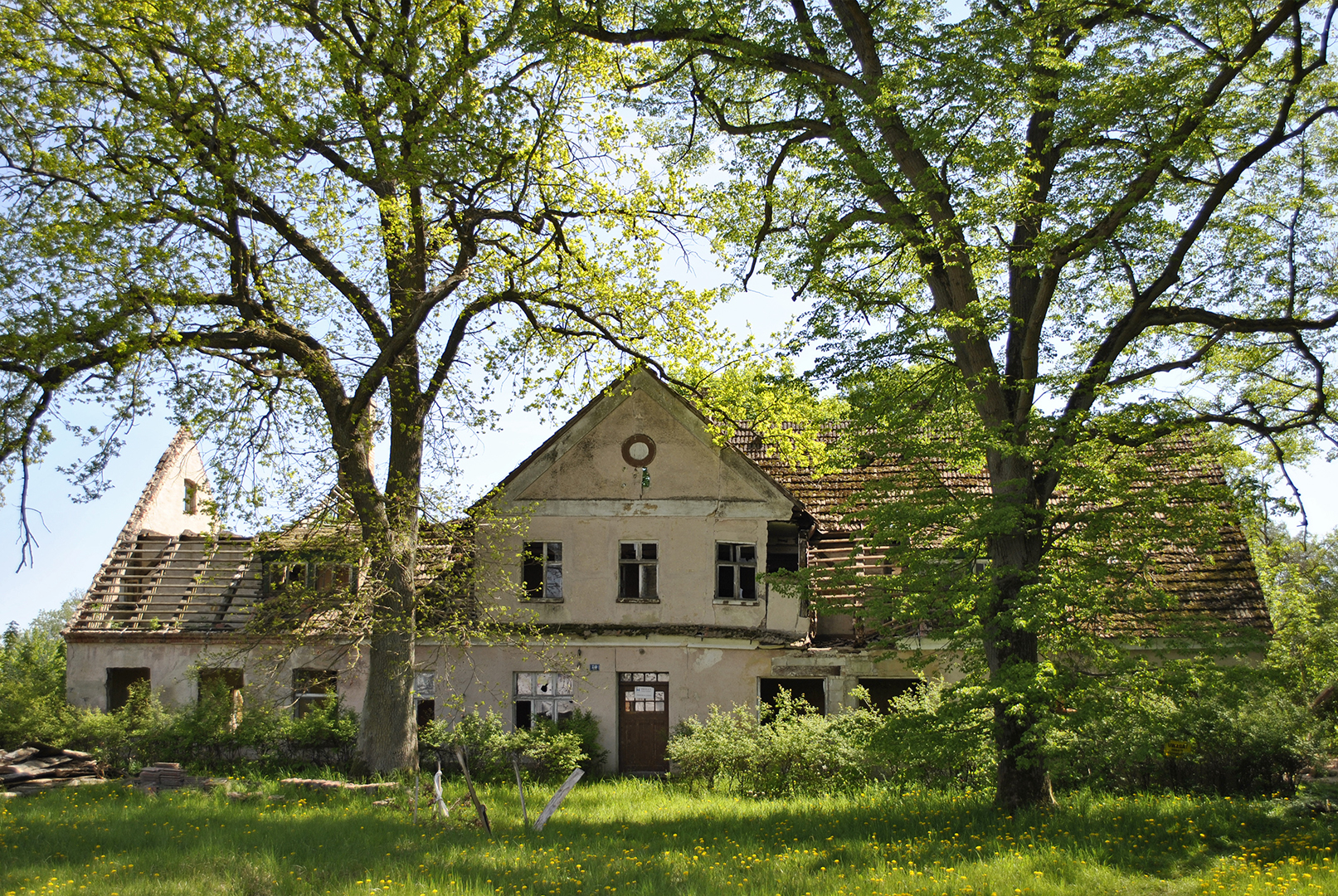
- Old manor house in Słajsino

- Location within Poland
- Coordinates: 53°39′41″N 15°15′37″E
- Country: Poland
- Voivodeship: West Pomeranian
- County: Goleniów
- Gmina: Nowogard
- Time zone: UTC+1 (CET)
  - Summer (DST): UTC+2 (CEST)
- Vehicle registration: ZGL

Słajsino [swai̯ˈɕinɔ] (German: Schloissin) is a village in the administrative district of Gmina Nowogard, within Goleniów County, West Pomeranian Voivodeship, in north-western Poland. It lies approximately 10 km (6 mi) east of Nowogard, 32 km (20 mi) north-east of Goleniów, and 53 km (33 mi) north-east of the regional capital Szczecin.

In the past the area formed part of Kingdom of Poland, the Duchy of Pomerania, the Kingdom of Prussia, and from 1871 to 1945 it was part of Germany following the unification of Germany under Prussian leadership. When part of Nazi Germany, a forced labour subcamp of the Nazi prison in Szczecin was operated in the village. After Germany's defeat in World War II, the region became again part of Poland.
