= Zakłodzie, West Pomeranian Voivodeship =

Zakłodzie
- Village
- Location within Poland
- Coordinates: 53°43′54″N 15°1′27″E
- Country: Poland
- Voivodeship: West Pomeranian
- County: Goleniów
- Gmina: Nowogard

Zakłodzie [zaˈkwɔd͡ʑɛ] (German: Schafbrück) is a village in the administrative district of Gmina Nowogard, within Goleniów County, West Pomeranian Voivodeship, in north-western Poland. It lies approximately 10 km (6 mi) north-west of Nowogard, 25 km (16 mi) north-east of Goleniów, and 46 km (29 mi) north-east of the regional capital Szczecin.

For the history of the region, see history of Pomerania.
