= Dąbrowa Nowogardzka =

- Village
- Location within Poland
- Coordinates: 53°42′52″N 15°3′30″E
- Country: Poland
- Voivodeship: West Pomeranian
- County: Goleniów
- Gmina: Nowogard

Dąbrowa Nowogardzka [dɔmˈbrɔva nɔvɔˈɡart͡ska] (German: Damerow) is a village in the administrative district of Gmina Nowogard, within Goleniów County, West Pomeranian Voivodeship, in north-western Poland. It lies approximately 7 km (4 mi) north-west of Nowogard, 25 km (16 mi) north-east of Goleniów, and 46 km (29 mi) north-east of the regional capital Szczecin.

== See also ==
- History of Pomerania
