= Zatocze =

- Village
- Location within Poland
- Coordinates: 53°47′4″N 15°8′17″E
- Country: Poland
- Voivodeship: West Pomeranian
- County: Goleniów
- Gmina: Nowogard

Zatocze [zaˈtɔt͡ʂɛ] (German: Gräfenbrück) is a village in the administrative district of Gmina Nowogard, within Goleniów County, West Pomeranian Voivodeship, in north-western Poland. It lies approximately 14 km (9 mi) north of Nowogard, 34 km (21 mi) north-east of Goleniów, and 55 km (34 mi) north-east of the regional capital Szczecin.

For the history of the region, see history of Pomerania.
