= Szczytniki, Goleniów County =

Szczytniki
- Village
- Location within Poland
- Coordinates: 53°46′49″N 15°5′17″E
- Country: Poland
- Voivodeship: West Pomeranian
- County: Goleniów
- Gmina: Nowogard

Szczytniki [ʂt͡ʂɨtˈniki] (German: Schnittriege) is a village in the administrative district of Gmina Nowogard, within Goleniów County, West Pomeranian Voivodeship, in north-western Poland. It lies approximately 13 km (8 mi) north of Nowogard, 32 km (20 mi) north-east of Goleniów, and 53 km (33 mi) north-east of the regional capital Szczecin.

For the history of the region, see history of Pomerania.
