= Błotny Młyn =

- Village
- Location within Poland
- Coordinates: 53°43′4″N 15°2′2″E
- Country: Poland
- Voivodeship: West Pomeranian
- County: Goleniów
- Gmina: Nowogard

Błotny Młyn [ˈbwɔtnɨ ˈmwɨn] (German: Friedrichsberger Mühle) is a village in the administrative district of Gmina Nowogard, within Goleniów County, West Pomeranian Voivodeship, in north-western Poland. It lies approximately 8 km (5 mi) north-west of Nowogard, 24 km (15 mi) north-east of Goleniów, and 45 km (28 mi) north-east of the regional capital Szczecin.
