= Olchowo, West Pomeranian Voivodeship =

Olchowo
- Village
- Location within Poland
- Coordinates: 53°39′10″N 15°4′17″E
- Country: Poland
- Voivodeship: West Pomeranian
- County: Goleniów
- Gmina: Nowogard
- Population: 240

Olchowo [ɔlˈxɔvɔ] (German: Wolchow) is a village in the administrative district of Gmina Nowogard, within Goleniów County, West Pomeranian Voivodeship, in north-western Poland. It lies approximately 4 km (2 mi) south-west of Nowogard, 21 km (13 mi) north-east of Goleniów, and 42 km (26 mi) north-east of the regional capital Szczecin.

For the history of the region, see history of Pomerania.

The village has a population of 240.
