= Drzysław =

- Village
- Location within Poland
- Coordinates: 53°42′3″N 15°7′47″E
- Country: Poland
- Voivodeship: West Pomeranian
- County: Goleniów
- Gmina: Nowogard

Drzysław [ˈdʐɨswaf] is a village in the administrative district of Gmina Nowogard, within Goleniów County, West Pomeranian Voivodeship, in north-western Poland. It lies approximately 4 km (2 mi) north of Nowogard, 27 km (17 mi) north-east of Goleniów, and 48 km (30 mi) north-east of the regional capital Szczecin.
