= Krasnołęka, West Pomeranian Voivodeship =

Krasnołęka
- Village
- Location within Poland
- Coordinates: 53°36′1″N 15°1′57″E
- Country: Poland
- Voivodeship: West Pomeranian
- County: Goleniów
- Gmina: Nowogard

Krasnołęka [krasnɔˈwɛnka] (German: Neu Langkafel) is a village in the administrative district of Gmina Nowogard, within Goleniów County, West Pomeranian Voivodeship, in north-western Poland. It lies approximately 10 km (6 mi) south-west of Nowogard, 16 km (10 mi) east of Goleniów, and 37 km (23 mi) north-east of the regional capital Szczecin.

For the history of the region, see history of Pomerania.
