= Dobroszyn, Gmina Nowogard =

Dobroszyn
- Village
- Location within Poland
- Coordinates: 53°43′45″N 15°1′24″E
- Country: Poland
- Voivodeship: West Pomeranian
- County: Goleniów
- Gmina: Nowogard

Dobroszyn [dɔˈbrɔʂɨn] is a village in the administrative district of Gmina Nowogard, within Goleniów County, West Pomeranian Voivodeship, in north-western Poland. It lies approximately 10 km (6 mi) north-west of Nowogard, 25 km (16 mi) north-east of Goleniów, and 46 km (29 mi) north-east of the regional capital Szczecin.
