= Żabowo, West Pomeranian Voivodeship =

Żabowo
- Village
- Location within Poland
- Coordinates: 53°43′17″N 15°11′23″E
- Country: Poland
- Voivodeship: West Pomeranian
- County: Goleniów
- Gmina: Nowogard

Żabowo [ʐaˈbɔvɔ] (formerly German: Groß Sabow) is a village in the administrative district of Gmina Nowogard, within Goleniów County, West Pomeranian Voivodeship, in north-western Poland. It lies approximately 8 km (5 mi) north-east of Nowogard, 32 km (20 mi) north-east of Goleniów, and 53 km (33 mi) north-east of the regional capital Szczecin.

For the history of the region, see history of Pomerania.
