= Nowe Wyszomierki =

- Village
- Location within Poland
- Coordinates: 53°36′33″N 15°4′56″E
- Country: Poland
- Voivodeship: West Pomeranian
- County: Goleniów
- Gmina: Nowogard
- Population: 10

Nowe Wyszomierki [ˈnɔvɛ vɨʂɔˈmjɛrki] (German: Neu Wismar) is a village in the administrative district of Gmina Nowogard, within Goleniów County, West Pomeranian Voivodeship, in north-western Poland. It lies approximately 7 km (4 mi) south of Nowogard, 19 km (12 mi) east of Goleniów, and 40 km (25 mi) north-east of the regional capital Szczecin.

For the history of the region, see history of Pomerania.

The village has a population of 10.
