= Lestkowo =

- Village
- Location within Poland
- Coordinates: 53°43′5″N 15°8′44″E
- Country: Poland
- Voivodeship: West Pomeranian
- County: Goleniów
- Gmina: Nowogard

Lestkowo [lɛstˈkɔvɔ] (German: Groß Leistikow) is a village in the administrative district of Gmina Nowogard, within Goleniów County, West Pomeranian Voivodeship, in north-western Poland. It lies approximately 7 km (4 mi) north of Nowogard, 29 km (18 mi) north-east of Goleniów, and 50 km (31 mi) north-east of the regional capital Szczecin.

For the history of the region, see history of Pomerania.
