= Suchy Las, West Pomeranian Voivodeship =

Suchy Las
- Village
- Location within Poland
- Coordinates: 53°42′38″N 14°58′44″E
- Country: Poland
- Voivodeship: West Pomeranian
- County: Goleniów
- Gmina: Nowogard

Suchy Las [ˈsuxɨ ˈlas] (German: Neuwald) is a village in the administrative district of Gmina Nowogard, within Goleniów County, West Pomeranian Voivodeship, in north-western Poland. It lies approximately 11 km (7 mi) north-west of Nowogard, 21 km (13 mi) north-east of Goleniów, and 42 km (26 mi) north-east of the regional capital Szczecin.

For the history of the region, see history of Pomerania.
