= Wierzchy, West Pomeranian Voivodeship =

Wierzchy
- Village
- Location within Poland
- Coordinates: 53°45′43″N 15°6′57″E
- Country: Poland
- Voivodeship: West Pomeranian
- County: Goleniów
- Gmina: Nowogard
- Population: 150

Wierzchy [ˈvjɛʂxɨ] (German: Vierhof) is a village in the administrative district of Gmina Nowogard, within Goleniów County, West Pomeranian Voivodeship, in north-western Poland. It lies approximately 11 km (7 mi) north of Nowogard, 31 km (19 mi) north-east of Goleniów, and 53 km (33 mi) north-east of the regional capital Szczecin.

For the history of the region, see history of Pomerania.

The village has a population of 150.
