= Stare Wyszomierki =

- Village
- Location within Poland
- Coordinates: 53°36′46″N 15°3′24″E
- Country: Poland
- Voivodeship: West Pomeranian
- County: Goleniów
- Gmina: Nowogard
- Population: 60

Stare Wyszomierki [ˈstarɛ vɨʂɔˈmjɛrki] is a village in the administrative district of Gmina Nowogard, within Goleniów County, West Pomeranian Voivodeship, in north-western Poland. It lies approximately 8 km (5 mi) south-west of Nowogard, 18 km (11 mi) north-east of Goleniów, and 39 km (24 mi) north-east of the regional capital Szczecin.

For the history of the region, see history of Pomerania.

The village has a population of 60.
