= Wojcieszyn, West Pomeranian Voivodeship =

Wojcieszyn
- Village
- Location within Poland
- Coordinates: 53°41′26″N 15°8′45″E
- Country: Poland
- Voivodeship: West Pomeranian
- County: Goleniów
- Gmina: Nowogard

Wojcieszyn (Polish: [vɔjˈt͡ɕɛʂɨn]; German: Eberstein) is a village in the administrative district of Gmina Nowogard, within Goleniów County, West Pomeranian Voivodeship, in north-western Poland. It lies approximately 4 km (2 mi) north-east of Nowogard, 27 km (17 mi) north-east of Goleniów, and 49 km (30 mi) north-east of the regional capital Szczecin.

For the history of the region, see history of Pomerania.
