= Legno =

Legno may refer to:

- Col legno, a performance technique for bowed string instruments
- Simone Legno, an Italian artist
- Ponte di Legno, a commune in Lombardy, Italy
- Woodblock (instrument), in Italian: cassa di legno

== See also ==
- Łęgno, Warmian-Masurian Voivodeship
- Łęgno, West Pomeranian Voivodeship
