= Miętno, West Pomeranian Voivodeship =

Miętno
- Village
- Location within Poland
- Coordinates: 53°42′43″N 15°7′5″E
- Country: Poland
- Voivodeship: West Pomeranian
- County: Goleniów
- Gmina: Nowogard

Miętno [ˈmjɛntnɔ] (German: Minten) is a village in the administrative district of Gmina Nowogard, within Goleniów County, West Pomeranian Voivodeship, in north-western Poland. It lies approximately 6 km (4 mi) north of Nowogard, 27 km (17 mi) north-east of Goleniów, and 49 km (30 mi) north-east of the regional capital Szczecin.

For the history of the region, see history of Pomerania.
