= Świerczewo, Goleniów County =

Świerczewo
- Village
- Location within Poland
- Coordinates: 53°40′40″N 15°2′38″E
- Country: Poland
- Voivodeship: West Pomeranian
- County: Goleniów
- Gmina: Nowogard
- Population: 250

Świerczewo (Polish: [ɕfjɛrˈt͡ʂɛvɔ]; German: Schwarzow) is a village in the administrative district of Gmina Nowogard, within Goleniów County, West Pomeranian Voivodeship, in north-western Poland. It lies approximately 5 km (3 mi) west of Nowogard, 21 km (13 mi) north-east of Goleniów, and 43 km (27 mi) north-east of the regional capital Szczecin.

For the history of the region, see history of Pomerania.

The village has a population of 250.
