= Błotno =

Błotno may refer to the following places:

- Błotno, Lubusz Voivodeship (west Poland)
- Błotno, Goleniów County in West Pomeranian Voivodeship (north-west Poland)
- Błotno, Stargard County in West Pomeranian Voivodeship (north-west Poland)
