= Wierzbięcin, West Pomeranian Voivodeship =

Wierzbięcin
- Village
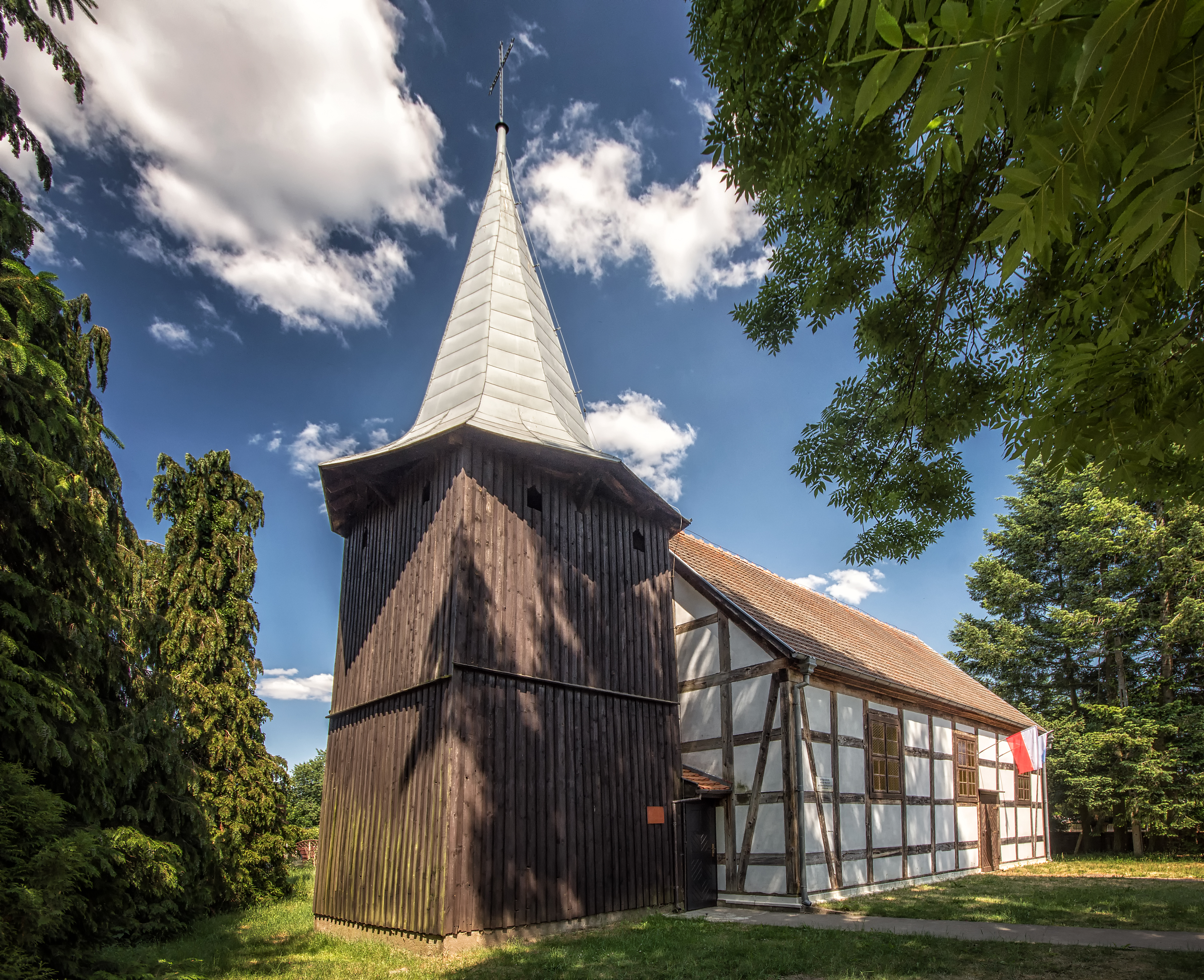
- Church of the Immaculate Conception in Wierzbięcin

- Location within Poland
- Coordinates: 53°38′54″N 15°13′19″E
- Country: Poland
- Voivodeship: West Pomeranian
- County: Goleniów
- Gmina: Nowogard
- Time zone: UTC+1 (CET)
  - Summer (DST): UTC+2 (CEST)
- Vehicle registration: ZGL

Wierzbięcin [vjɛʐˈbjɛnt͡ɕin] is a village in the administrative district of Gmina Nowogard, within Goleniów County, West Pomeranian Voivodeship, in north-western Poland. It lies approximately 8 km (5 mi) east of Nowogard, 29 km (18 mi) east of Goleniów, and 50 km (31 mi) north-east of the regional capital Szczecin.
