= Zbyszewice, West Pomeranian Voivodeship =

Zbyszewice
- Village
- Location within Poland
- Coordinates: 53°42′38″N 15°10′10″E
- Country: Poland
- Voivodeship: West Pomeranian
- County: Goleniów
- Gmina: Nowogard

Zbyszewice [zbɨʂɛˈvit͡sɛ] (German: Petermannshof) is a village in the administrative district of Gmina Nowogard, within Goleniów County, West Pomeranian Voivodeship, in north-western Poland.

For the history of the region, see history of Pomerania.
