= Osowo =

Osowo may refer to:

- Osowo, Gostyń County in Greater Poland Voivodeship (west-central Poland)
- Osowo, Września County in Greater Poland Voivodeship (west-central Poland)
- Osowo, Złotów County in Greater Poland Voivodeship (west-central Poland)
- Osowo, Kościerzyna County in Pomeranian Voivodeship (north Poland)
- Osowo, Słupsk County in Pomeranian Voivodeship (north Poland)
- Osowo, Warmian-Masurian Voivodeship (north Poland)
- Osowo, Goleniów County in West Pomeranian Voivodeship (north-west Poland)
- Osowo, Świdwin County in West Pomeranian Voivodeship (north-west Poland)
