= Miodne =

- Settlement
- Location within Poland
- Coordinates: 53°43′39″N 15°01′23″E
- Country: Poland
- Voivodeship: West Pomeranian
- County: Goleniów
- Gmina: Nowogard

Miodne [ˈmjɔdnɛ] (German: Schönhaus) is a settlement in the administrative district of Gmina Nowogard, within Goleniów County, West Pomeranian Voivodeship, in north-western Poland.
