= Sieciechowo =

- Village
- Location within Poland
- Coordinates: 53°38′40″N 15°07′24″E
- Country: Poland
- Voivodeship: West Pomeranian
- County: Goleniów
- Gmina: Nowogard

Sieciechowo [ɕɛt͡ɕɛˈxɔvɔ] (German: Wegeshof) is a village in the administrative district of Gmina Nowogard, within Goleniów County, West Pomeranian Voivodeship, in north-western Poland.

For the history of the region, see history of Pomerania.
