= Wierzchęcino =

- Settlement
- Location within Poland
- Coordinates: 53°43′47″N 15°02′11″E
- Country: Poland
- Voivodeship: West Pomeranian
- County: Goleniów
- Gmina: Nowogard

Wierzchęcino [vjɛʂxɛnˈt͡ɕinɔ] (German: Verchentin) is a settlement in the administrative district of Gmina Nowogard, within Goleniów County, West Pomeranian Voivodeship, in north-western Poland.

For the history of the region, see history of Pomerania.
