= Maszkowo, Goleniów County =

Maszkowo
- Village
- Location within Poland
- Coordinates: 53°41′48″N 15°11′9″E
- Country: Poland
- Voivodeship: West Pomeranian
- County: Goleniów
- Gmina: Nowogard

Maszkowo [maʂˈkɔvɔ] (German: Maskow) is a village in the administrative district of Gmina Nowogard, within Goleniów County, West Pomeranian Voivodeship, in north-western Poland. It lies approximately 6 km (4 mi) north-east of Nowogard, 30 km (19 mi) north-east of Goleniów, and 51 km (32 mi) north-east of the regional capital Szczecin.

For the history of the region, see history of Pomerania.
