= Czermnica =

- Village
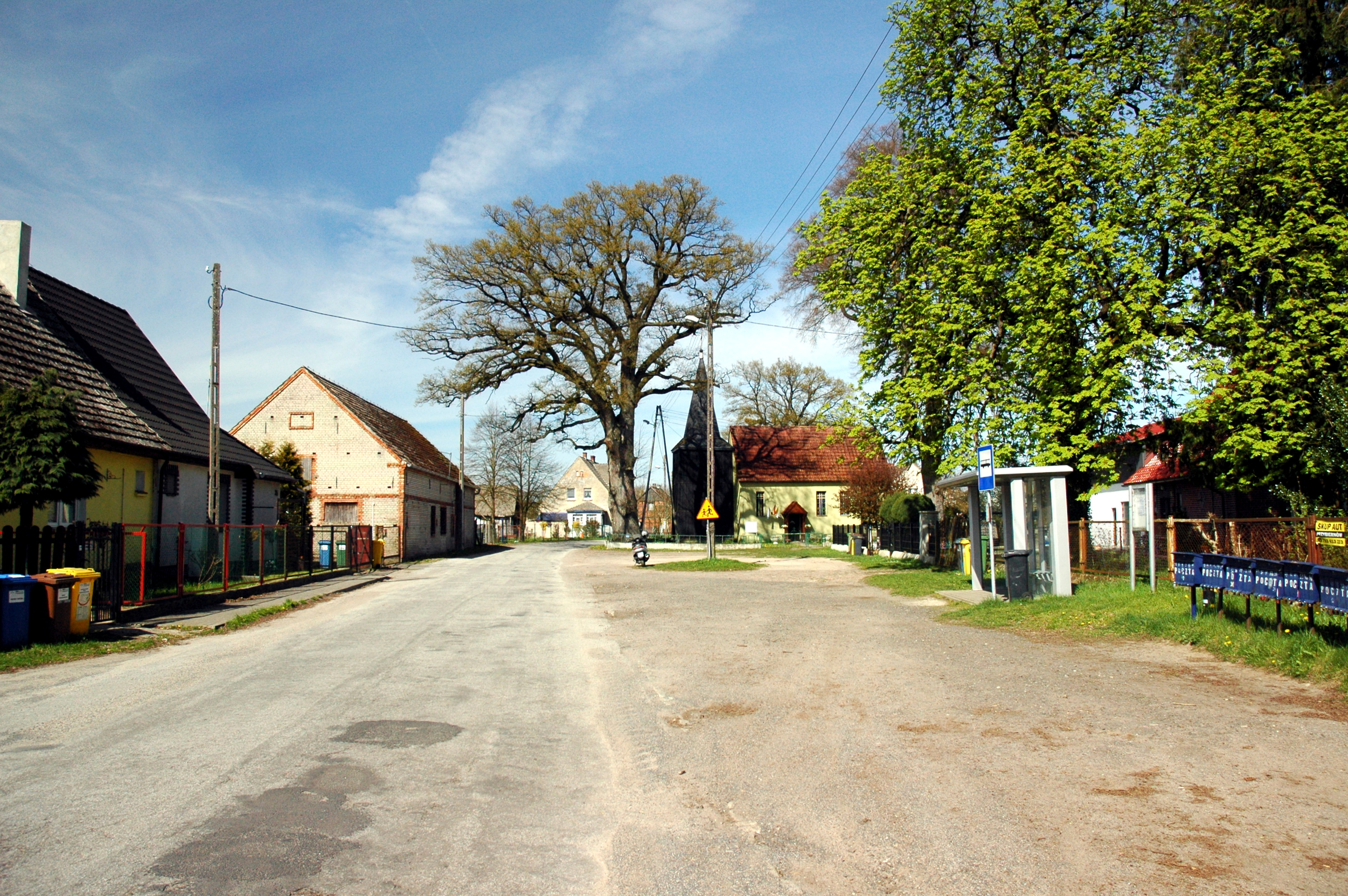

- Location within Poland
- Coordinates: 53°41′55″N 14°57′52″E
- Country: Poland
- Voivodeship: West Pomeranian
- County: Goleniów
- Gmina: Nowogard
- Website: folklor.biz/nowogard-okolice

Czermnica [t͡ʂɛrmˈnit͡sa] is a village in the administrative district of Gmina Nowogard, within Goleniów County, West Pomeranian Voivodeship, in north-western Poland. It lies approximately 11 km (7 mi) west of Nowogard, 20 km (12 mi) north-east of Goleniów, and 41 km (25 mi) north-east of the regional capital Szczecin.
