= Łęgno, West Pomeranian Voivodeship =

Łęgno
- Village
- Location within Poland
- Coordinates: 53°45′43″N 14°58′48″E
- Country: Poland
- Voivodeship: West Pomeranian
- County: Goleniów
- Gmina: Nowogard

Łęgno [ˈwɛnɡnɔ] (German: Langendorf) is a village in the administrative district of Gmina Nowogard, within Goleniów County, West Pomeranian Voivodeship, in north-western Poland. It lies approximately 14 km (9 mi) north-west of Nowogard, 26 km (16 mi) north-east of Goleniów, and 47 km (29 mi) north-east of the regional capital Szczecin.

For the history of the region, see history of Pomerania.
