= Ogorzele =

- Village
- Location within Poland
- Coordinates: 53°42′13″N 15°02′36″E
- Country: Poland
- Voivodeship: West Pomeranian
- County: Goleniów
- Gmina: Nowogard

Ogorzele [ɔɡɔˈʐɛlɛ] (German: Neuendorf bei Naugard) is a village in the administrative district of Gmina Nowogard, within Goleniów County, West Pomeranian Voivodeship, in north-western Poland.
