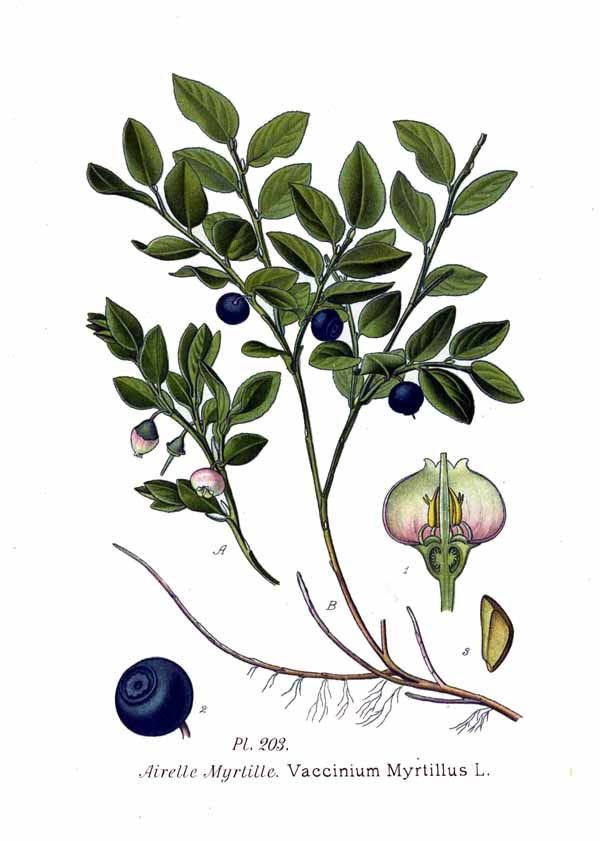
- By Amédée Masclef, published in Atlas des plantes de France, 1891

Conservation status
- Secure (NatureServe)

Scientific classification
- Kingdom: Plantae
- Clade: Tracheophytes
- Clade: Angiosperms
- Clade: Eudicots
- Clade: Asterids
- Order: Ericales
- Family: Ericaceae
- Genus: Vaccinium
- Subgenus: Vaccinium subg. Vaccinium
- Section: Vaccinium sect. Myrtillus
- Species: V. myrtillus

Binomial name
- Vaccinium myrtillus L. 1753

Synonyms
- Myrtillus niger Gilib.; Myrtillus sylvaticus Drejer; Vaccinium oreophilum Rydb.; Vitis-idaea myrtillus (L.) Moench

= Vaccinium myrtillus =

Berry and plant

Vaccinium myrtillus is a holarctic species of shrub with edible fruit of blue color, known by the common names bilberry, blaeberry, and whortleberry. It is more precisely called common bilberry or blue whortleberry to distinguish it from other Vaccinium relatives.

== Description ==
Vaccinium myrtillus is a small deciduous shrub that grows 10–51 centimetres (4–20 in) tall, heavily branched with upright, angular to narrow winged, green-colored branches that are glabrous. It grows rhizomes, creating extensive patches. The shrub can live up to 30 years, with roots reaching depths of up to 1 metre (3 1/2 ft). It has light green leaves that turn red in autumn and are simple and alternate in arrangement. The leaves are 1–3 cm (3/8–1 1/8 in) long and ovate to lanceolate or broadly elliptic in shape, with glandular to finely toothed margins; they are prominently veined on the lower surface. In winter, the foliage turns deep red and becomes deciduous.

Small, hermaphrodite flowers with thick stems (about 2–3 millimetres or 1/16–1/8 inch long) grow individually from the leaf axils and nod downward. These flowers, blooming from April to May, have crowns 4 to 6 mm long that are greenish to reddish. The small calyx is fused with minimal lobes on the cup-shaped flower. The rounded, urn-shaped, white-to-pink petals have short, curved lobes. The 8–10 stamens are short, and the anthers are awned and horned. The four- or five-chambered ovary is inferior with a long style.

From July to September, the plants produce black-blue, flattened, round fruits with a diameter up to 1 cm. These multi-seeded berries have calyx remnants on the tip and a blue-gray frosted appearance. Rarely, forms with white, yellow, red, or reddish-spotted berries occur. The small, brownish seeds are crescent-shaped. This species differs from V. corymbosum in that its anthocyanins, which produce color, are found in both the peel and the flesh. Its fruit persists for an average of 16.7 days, and bears an average of 25.3 seeds per fruit. Fruits average 85.4% water, and their dry weight includes 31.1% carbohydrates and 2.7% lipids.

The plant is diploid, with a total of 24 chromosomes.

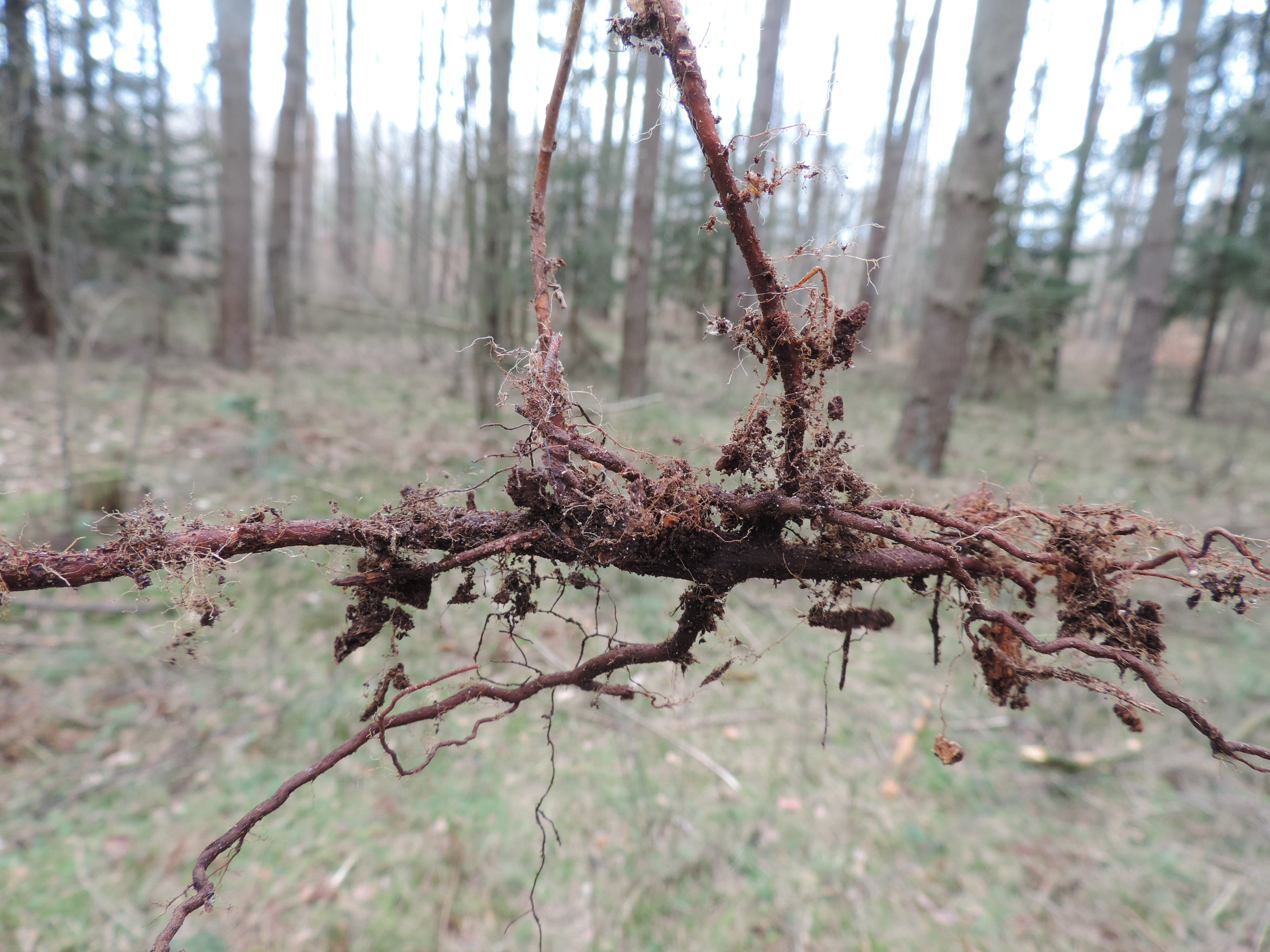
Rhizomes

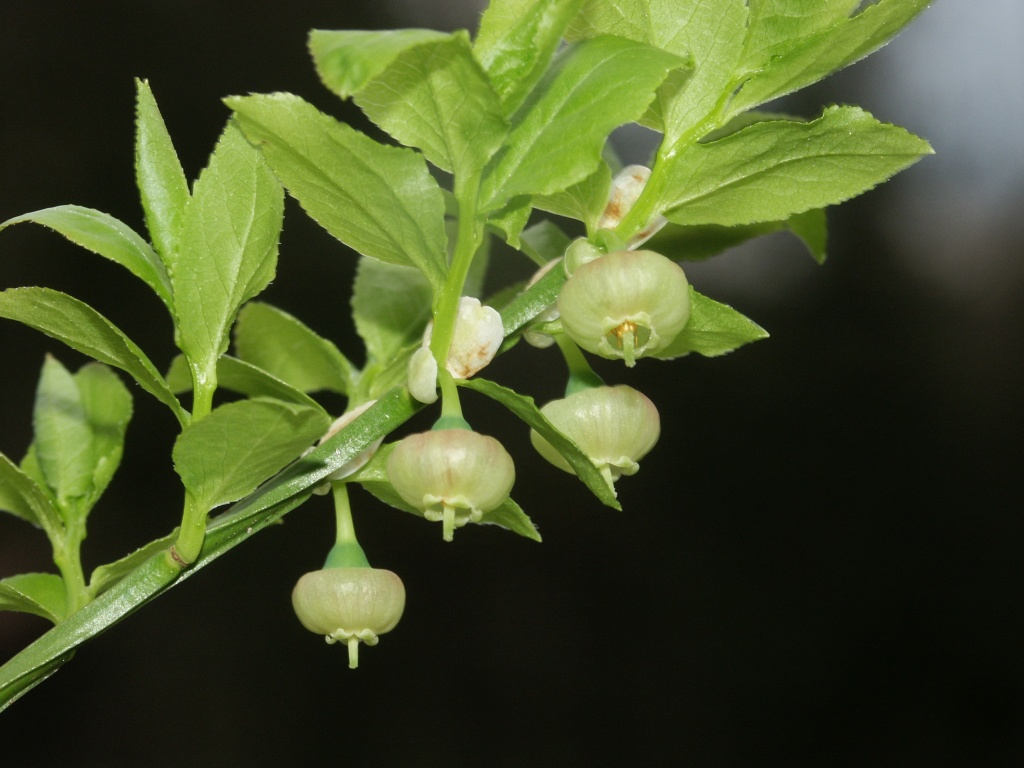
Flowers on inflorescens

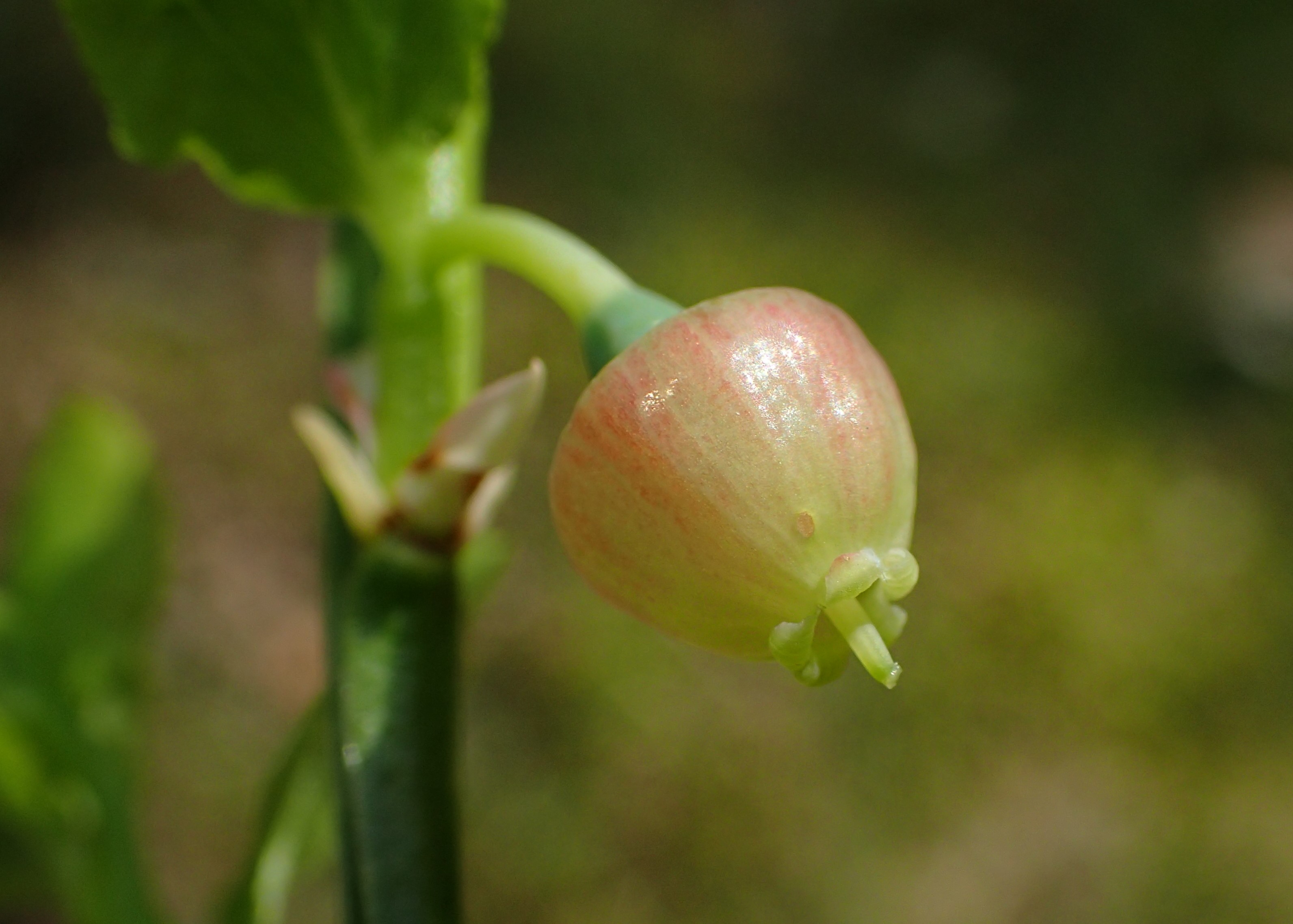
Flower

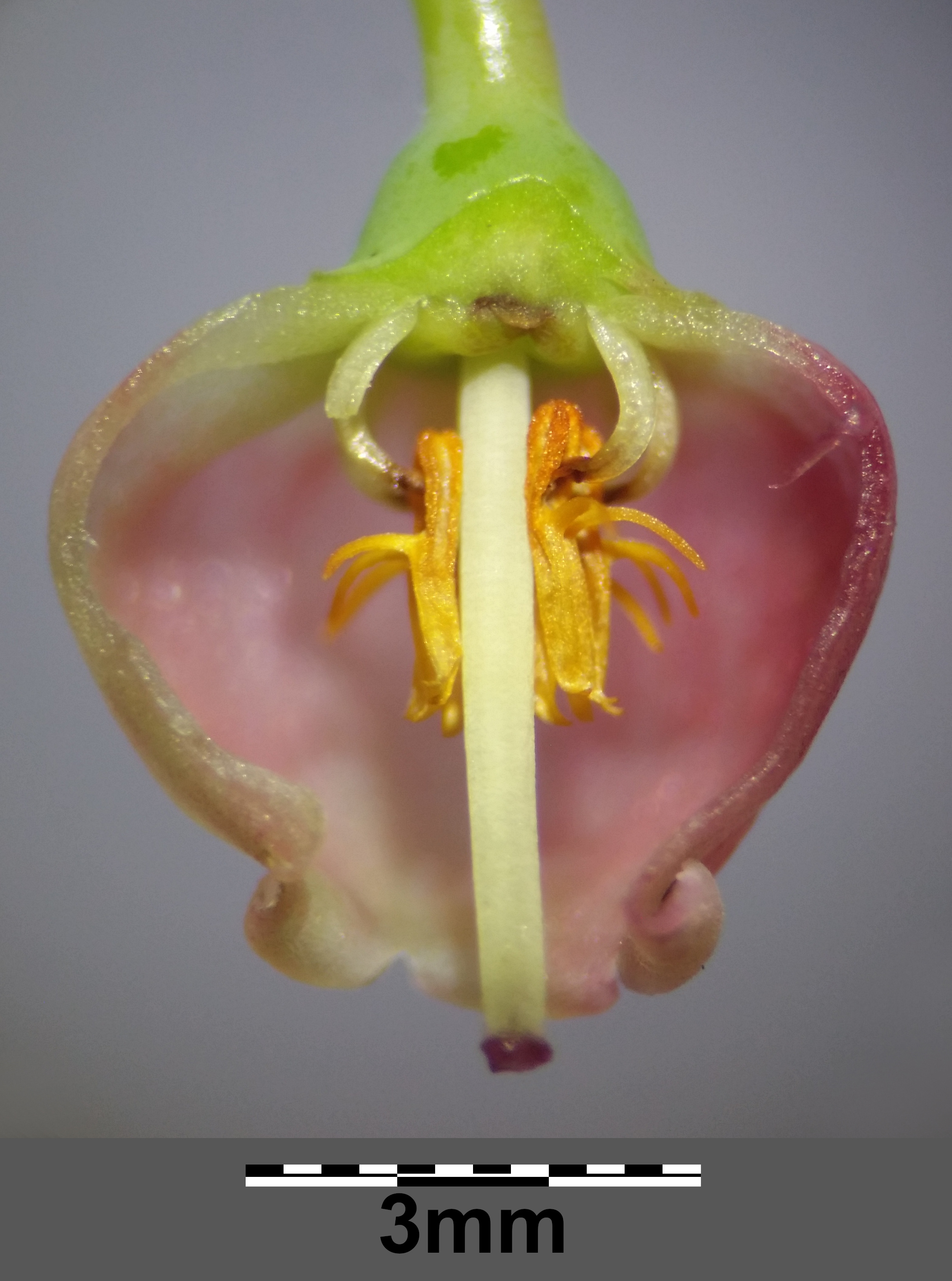
Flower cross-section

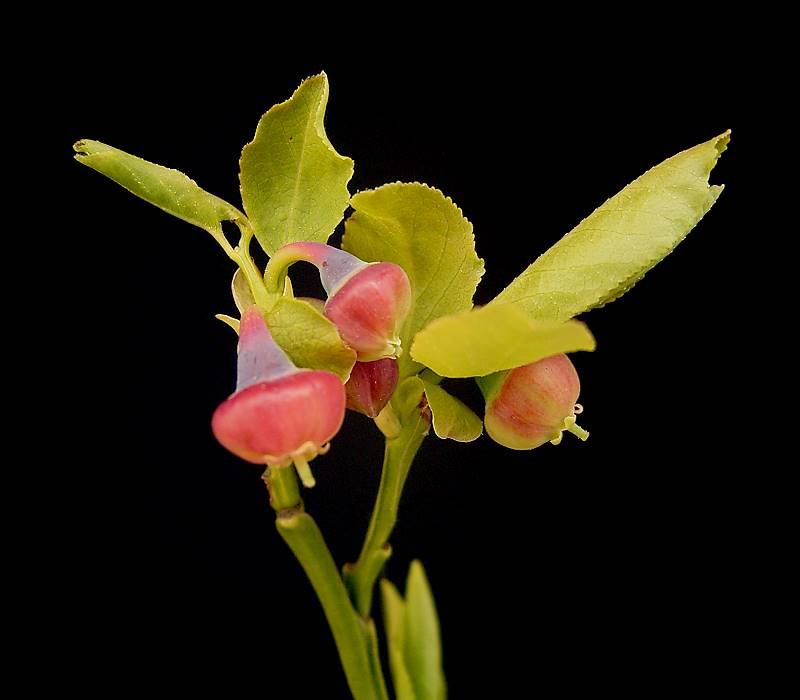
Mature flowers

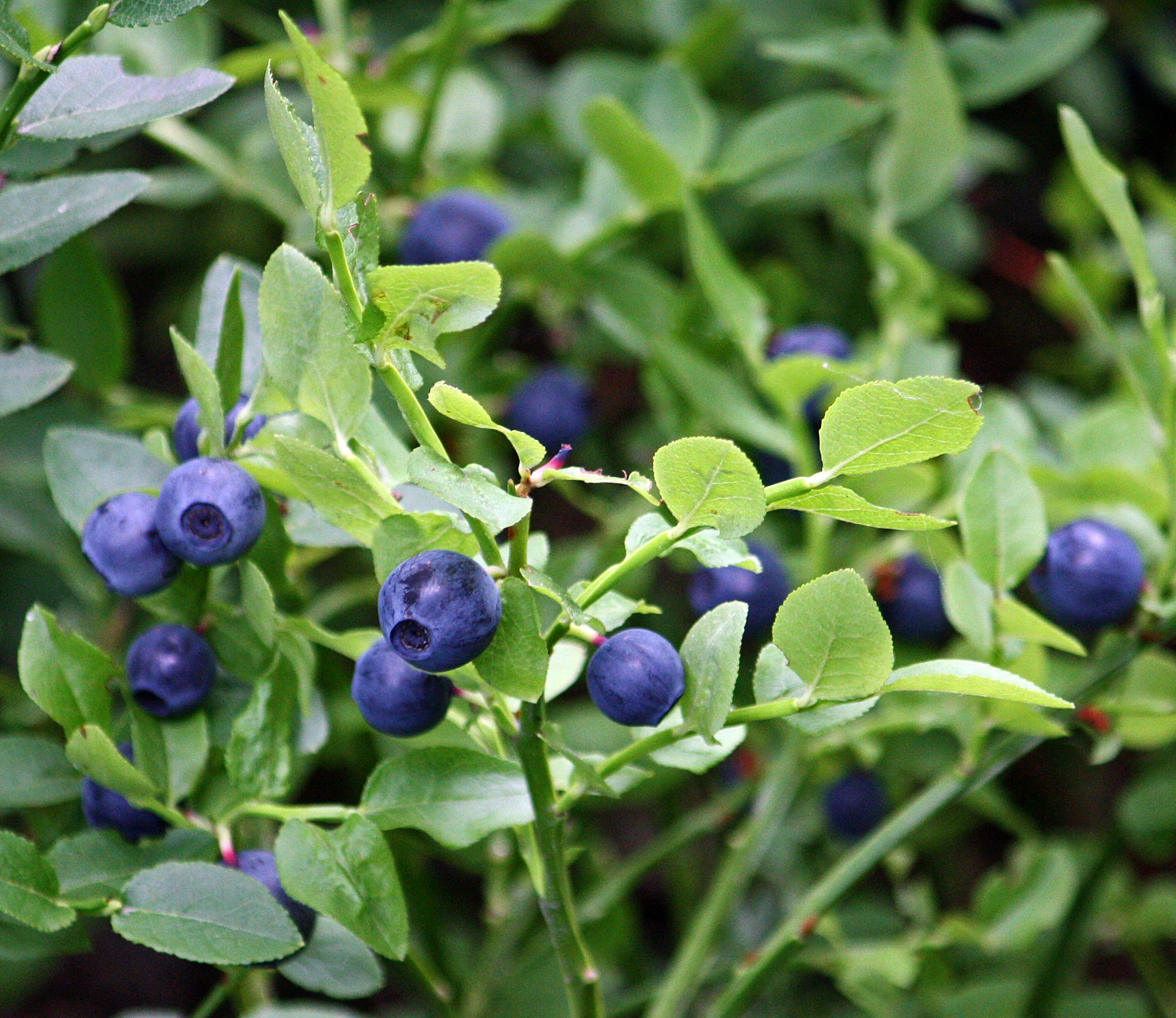
Fruits

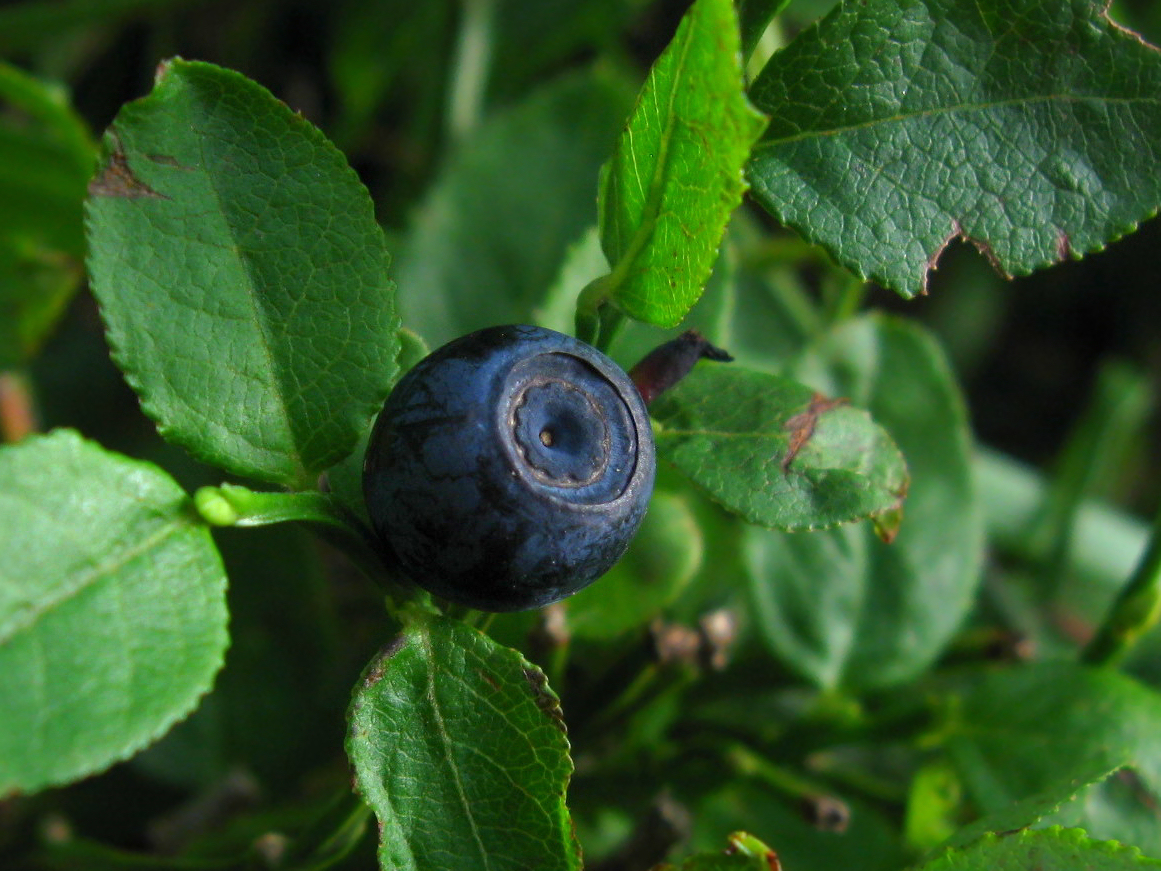
Fruit close-up

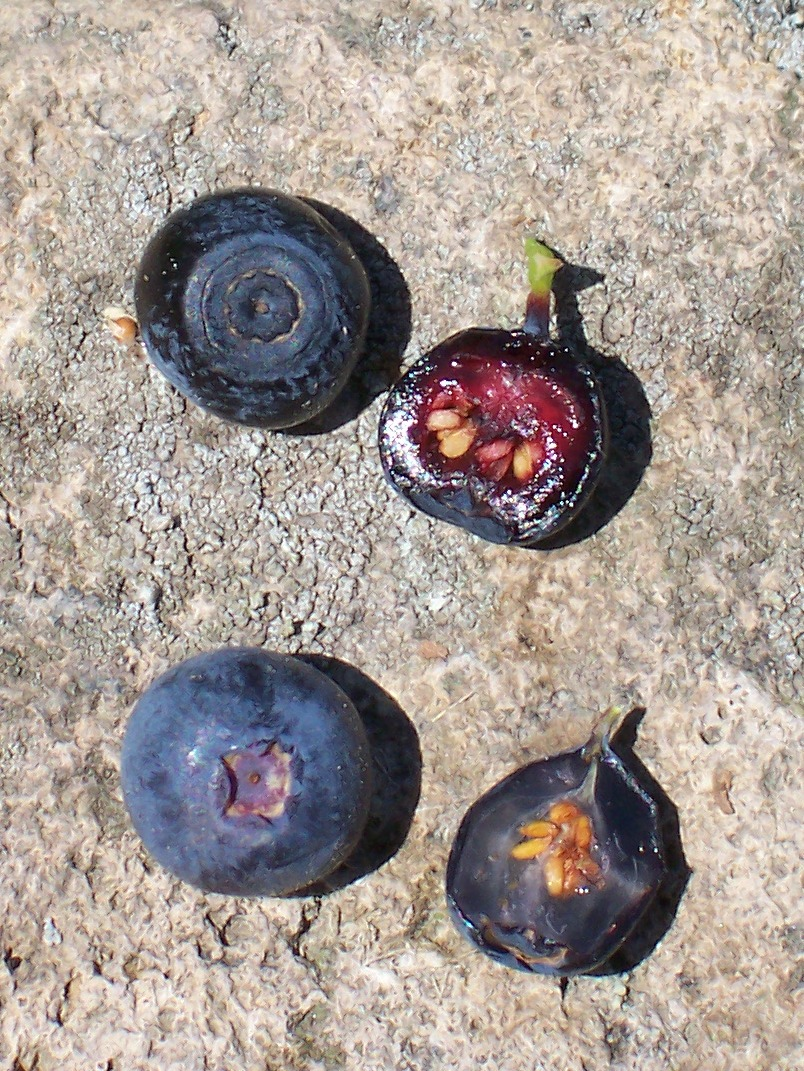
Fruit (top) showing red flesh compared to V. uliginosum (bottom)

=== Chemistry ===
Bilberry and the related V. uliginosum both produce lignins, in part because they are used as defensive chemicals. Although many plants change their lignin production – usually to increase it – to handle the stresses of climate change, lignin levels of both Vaccinium species appear to be unaffected. The leaves contain catechins, tannins, quinic acid, arbutin, chlorogenic acid, various glycosides, the fruits contain anthocyanins, pectin, ursolic acid, chlorogenic acid, and ascorbic acid.

V. myrtillus contains a high concentration of triterpenes which remain under laboratory research for their possible biological effects.

== Etymology ==
The genus Vaccinium has at least three theories as to its origin. It might be taken from the Latin vacca for cow with the idea it was named for cows eating the bushes, but it may be from bacca the word for berry. The third theory is that is derives from the genus Hyacinthus. The species name refers to the resemblance of its leaves to that of common myrtle.

The name bilberry is primarily applied to Vaccinium myrtillus, but is also an alternate name for the genus Vaccinium as a whole. The name bilberry appears to be an English borrowing from Old Norse being very similar to the Danish bøllebær, used for the same plant. The names whortleberry, whortles, and tracleberry, are similarly generally applied to this species but are also sometimes used for other species or the genus. The name huckleberry generally means species in the related genus Gaylussacia, but is also sometimes used to mean V. myrtillus or other species of the blueberry genus.

The names myrtille and myrtle whortleberry are preferred in Canada specifically mean this plant species.

Regional names include blaeberry (in Scotland), braoileag (in Scottish Gaelic), urts or hurts (Cornwall and Devon), hurtleberry, myrtleberry, wimberry, whinberry, winberry, and fraughan.

== Distribution and habitat ==
Vaccinium myrtillus is a Holarctic species native to almost every country in Europe, north and central Asia, Japan, Greenland, Western Canada, and the Western United States. Within Europe it is only absent from Sardinia, Sicily, the European portion of Turkey, Crete, the Aegean Islands, Cyprus, Crimea, and southern European Russia. It occurs in the acidic soils of heaths, boggy barrens, moorlands, degraded meadows, open forests at the base of pine and mountain spruce forests, and parklands, slopes, and moraines at elevations up to 2,350 m (7,710 ft).

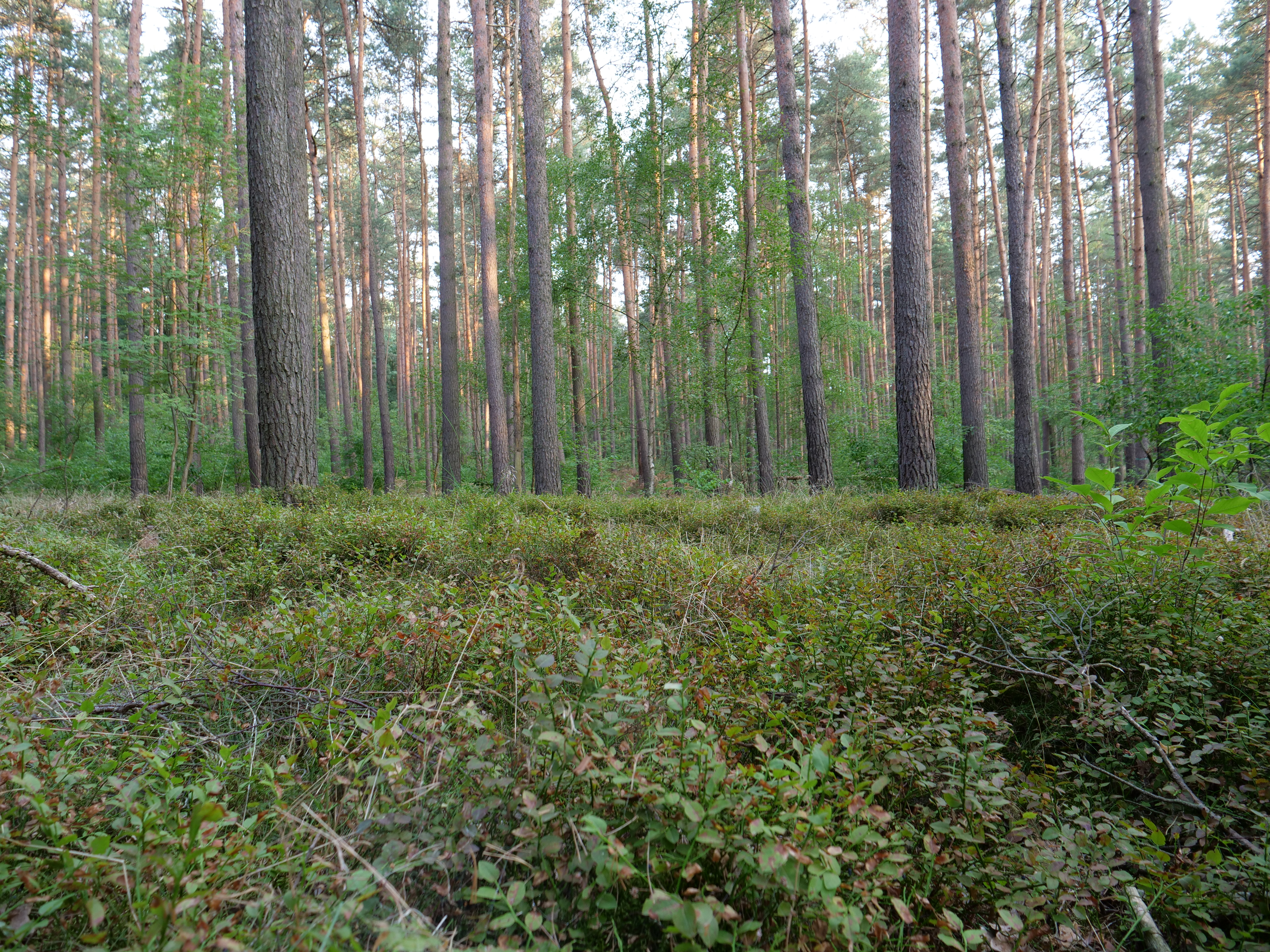
Spandau forest, Germany

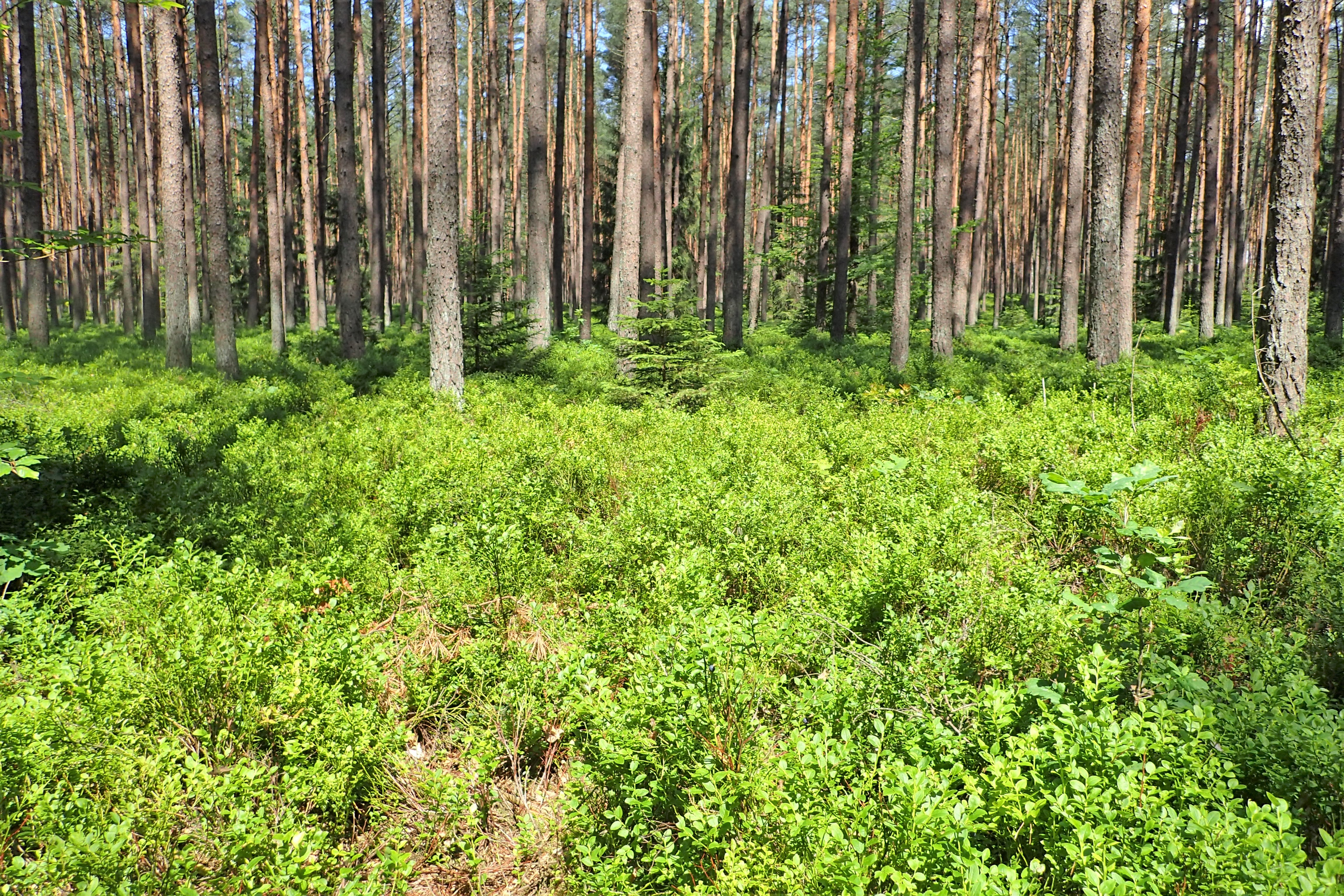
Pine forest understory in Czermnica, Poland

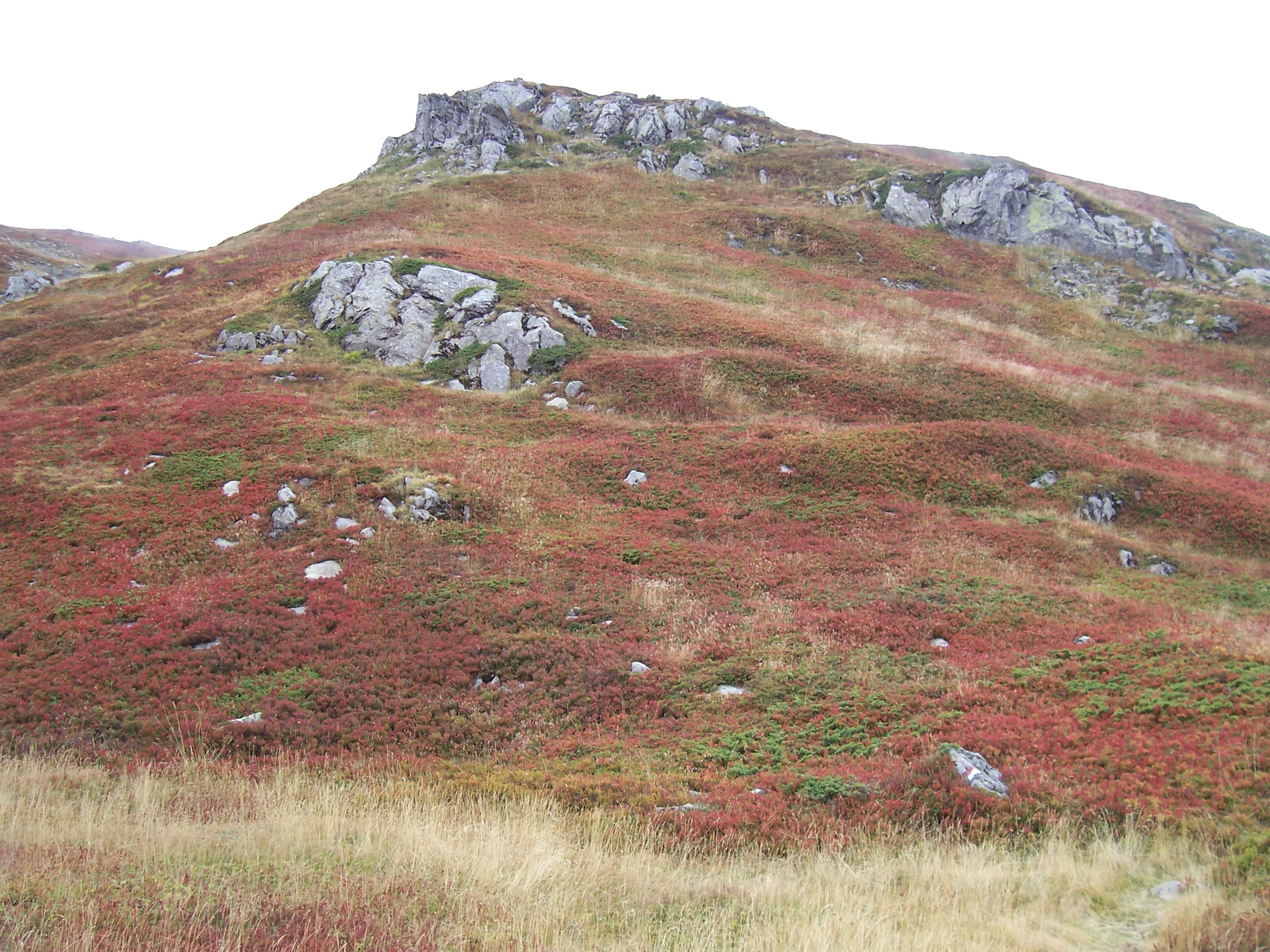
Apennine Mountains, Italy

== Toxicity ==
Consuming the leaves may be unsafe.

== Uses ==
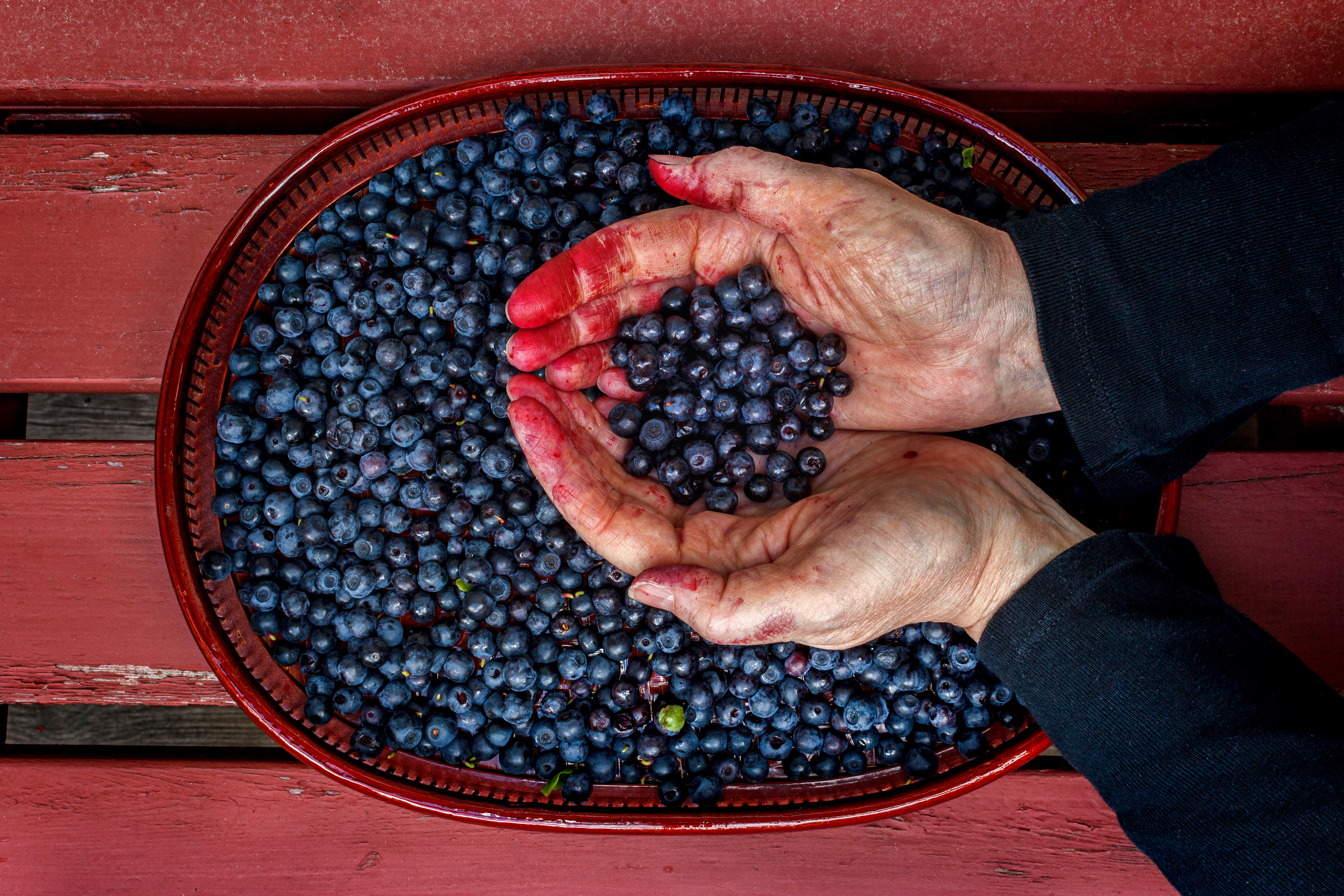
Bilberries have dark red juice that stains hands.

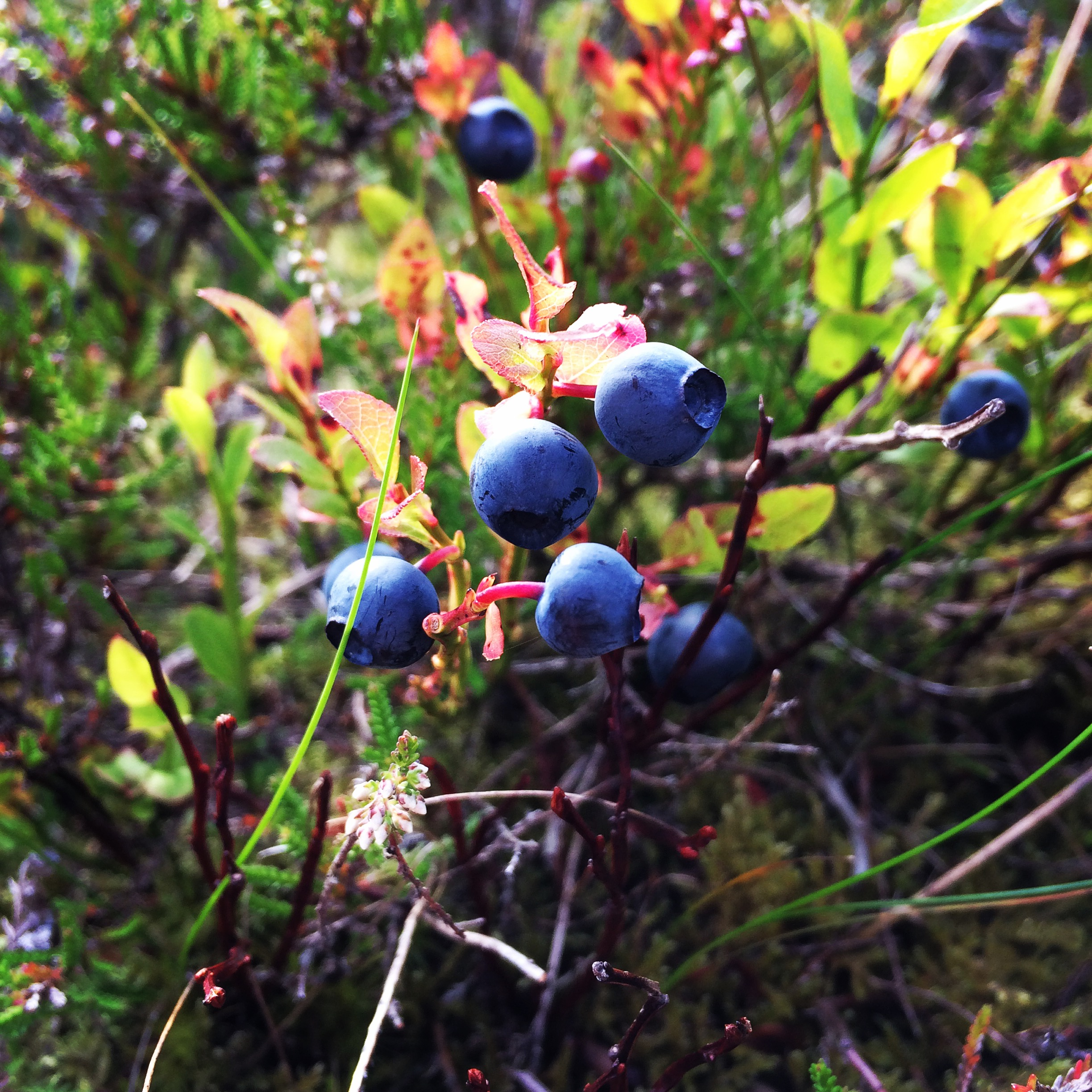
Bilberries

=== Fruit ===
The berry is edible. The fruits will stain hands, teeth and tongue deep blue or purple while eating and so it was traditionally used as a dye for food and clothes in Britain.

In cooking, the bilberry fruit is commonly used for pies, tarts and flans, cakes, jams, muffins, cookies, sauces, syrups, juices, and candies.

Although bilberries are in high demand by consumers in Northern Europe, the berries are harvested in the wild without any cultivation. Some authors state that opportunities exist to improve the crop if cultivated using common agricultural practices.

=== Dietary supplement ===
Bilberry dietary supplements are marketed in some countries, although there is no evidence these products have any effect on health or diseases. Vaccinium myrtillus has been used for centuries in traditional medicine, particularly in traditional Austrian medicine as a tea or liqueur in attempts to treat various disorders.

=== Leaves ===
In traditional medicine, the (potentially toxic) leaves were mainly used for treating skin disorders.

== See also ==
- Blaeberry River
- Berberis aquifolium (Oregon grape)
- Myrtus

== Bibliography ==
- Ehrlén, Johan; Eriksson, Ove (1991). "Phenological variation in fruit characteristics in vertebrate-dispersed plants". Oecologia. 86 (4): 463–470. Bibcode:1991Oecol..86..463E. doi:10.1007/BF00318311. ISSN 0029-8549. PMID 28313326.
