= Maszkowo =

Maszkowo may refer to the following places:

- Maszkowo, Pomeranian Voivodeship (north Poland)
- Maszkowo, Goleniów County in West Pomeranian Voivodeship (north-west Poland)
- Maszkowo, Koszalin County in West Pomeranian Voivodeship (north-west Poland)
- Maszkowo, Police County in West Pomeranian Voivodeship (north-west Poland)
