= Bieńczyce, West Pomeranian Voivodeship =

Bieńczyce
- Village
- Location within Poland
- Coordinates: 53°37′40″N 15°18′2″E
- Country: Poland
- Voivodeship: West Pomeranian
- County: Goleniów
- Gmina: Nowogard

Bieńczyce (Polish pronunciation: [bjɛɲˈt͡ʂɨt͡sɛ]) is a village in the administrative district of Gmina Nowogard, within Goleniów County, West Pomeranian Voivodeship, in north-western Poland. It lies approximately 13 km (8 mi) east of Nowogard, 34 km (21 mi) east of Goleniów, and 53 km (33 mi) north-east of the regional capital Szczecin.
