= Wołowiec =

Wołowiec may refer to the following places:

- Wołowiec, Lesser Poland Voivodeship (south Poland)
- Wołowiec, Goleniów County in West Pomeranian Voivodeship (north-west Poland)
- Wołowiec, Kamień County in West Pomeranian Voivodeship (north-west Poland)
- Wołowiec, a mountain in Western Tatra Mountains
