= Błotno, Goleniów County =

Błotno
- Village
- Location within Poland
- Coordinates: 53°45′10″N 15°1′4″E
- Country: Poland
- Voivodeship: West Pomeranian
- County: Goleniów
- Gmina: Nowogard

Błotno [ˈbwɔtnɔ] (German: Friedrichsberg) is a village in the administrative district of Gmina Nowogard, within Goleniów County, West Pomeranian Voivodeship, in north-western Poland. It lies approximately 12 km (7 mi) north-west of Nowogard, 27 km (17 mi) north-east of Goleniów, and 48 km (30 mi) north-east of the regional capital Szczecin.
