= Gardna =

- Village
- Location within Poland
- Coordinates: 53°39′17″N 15°05′19″E
- Country: Poland
- Voivodeship: West Pomeranian
- County: Goleniów
- Gmina: Nowogard

Gardna [ˈɡardna] is a village in the administrative district of Gmina Nowogard, within Goleniów County, West Pomeranian Voivodeship, in north-western Poland.
