= Osowo, Goleniów County =

Osowo
- Village
- Location within Poland
- Coordinates: 53°38′23″N 15°15′53″E
- Country: Poland
- Voivodeship: West Pomeranian
- County: Goleniów
- Gmina: Nowogard

Osowo [ɔˈsɔvɔ] (German: Wussow) is a village in the administrative district of Gmina Nowogard, within Goleniów County, West Pomeranian Voivodeship, in north-western Poland. It lies approximately 11 km (7 mi) east of Nowogard, 32 km (20 mi) east of Goleniów, and 52 km (32 mi) north-east of the regional capital Szczecin.

For the history of the region, see history of Pomerania.
