= Bieńczyce =

Bieńczyce may refer to:

- Bieńczyce, Kraków, an administrative district of Kraków, Poland
- Bieńczyce, West Pomeranian Voivodeship, a village in the district of Gmina Nowogard, Goleniów County, West Pomeranian Voivodeship, Poland
