= Świerczewo =

Świerczewo may refer to the following places in Poland:

- Świerczewo, Poznań
- Świerczewo, Szczecin
- Świerczewo, Kuyavian-Pomeranian Voivodeship
- Świerczewo, Goleniów County
