= Radziszewo, Goleniów County =

Radziszewo
- Village
- Location within Poland
- Coordinates: 53°43′15″N 15°4′40″E
- Country: Poland
- Voivodeship: West Pomeranian
- County: Goleniów
- Gmina: Nowogard

Radziszewo [rad͡ʑiˈʂɛvɔ] (German: Radefeld) is a village in the administrative district of Gmina Nowogard, within Goleniów County, West Pomeranian Voivodeship, in north-western Poland.
