= Gmina Nowogard =

Gmina Nowogard Nowogard Commune
- Gmina
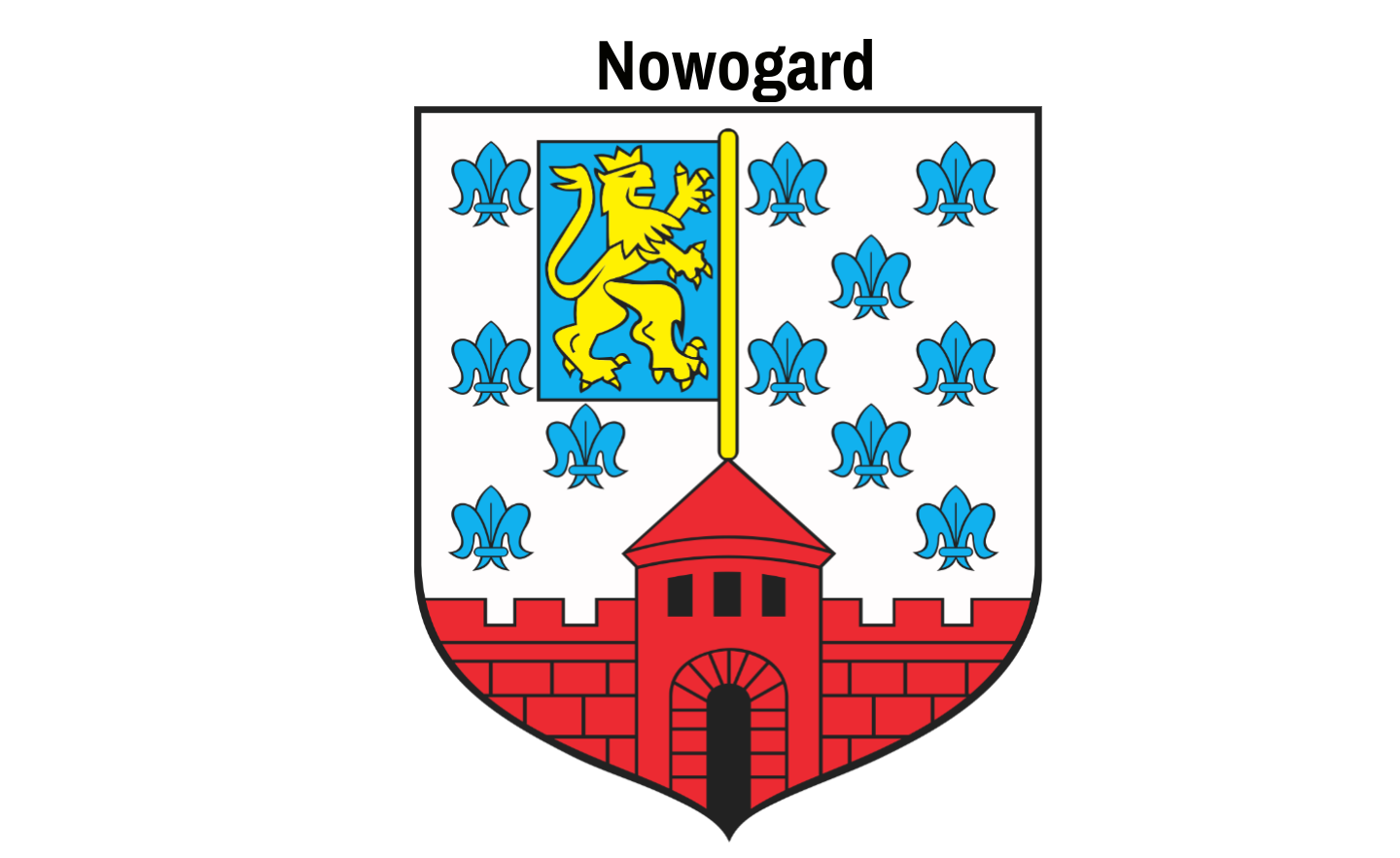
- Flag Coat of arms
- Interactive map of Gmina Nowogard
- Coordinates (Nowogard): 53°40′N 15°7′E
- Country: Poland
- Voivodeship: West Pomeranian
- County: Goleniów
- Seat: Nowogard

Area
  - Total: 338.66 km^{2} (130.76 sq mi)

Population (2006)
  - Total: 24,510
  - Density: 72.37/km^{2} (187.4/sq mi)
  - Urban: 16,745
  - Rural: 7,765
- Website: http://www.nowogard.pl/

Gmina Nowogard is an urban-rural gmina (administrative district) in Goleniów County, West Pomeranian Voivodeship, in north-western Poland. Its seat is the town of Nowogard, which lies approximately 24 kilometres (15 mi) north-east of Goleniów and 45 km (28 mi) north-east of the regional capital Szczecin.

The gmina covers an area of 338.66 square kilometres (130.8 sq mi), and as of 2006 its total population is 24,510 (out of which the population of Nowogard amounts to 16,745, and the population of the rural part of the gmina is 7,765).

== Villages ==
Apart from the town of Nowogard, Gmina Nowogard contains the villages and settlements of:

- Bieńczyce
- Bieniczki
- Błotno
- Błotny Młyn
- Bochlin
- Boguszyce
- Bromierz
- Brzozowo
- Czermnica
- Dąbrowa Nowogardzka
- Długołęka
- Dobroszyn
- Drzysław
- Gardna
- Glicko
- Grabin
- Jarchlino
- Karsk
- Konarzewo
- Kościuszki
- Krasnołęka
- Kulice
- Łęgno
- Lestkowo
- Maszkowo
- Miękkie
- Miętno
- Miodne
- Nowe Wyszomierki
- Ogary
- Ogorzele
- Olchowo
- Olszyca
- Orzechowo
- Orzesze
- Osowo
- Ostrzyca
- Otręby
- Płotkowo
- Ptaszkowo
- Radłowo
- Radziszewo
- Sąpole
- Sąpolnica
- Sieciechowo
- Sikorki
- Słajsino
- Stare Wyszomierki
- Starogoszcz
- Struga
- Strzelewo
- Suchy Las
- Świerczewo
- Szczytniki
- Trzechel
- Warnkowo
- Wierzbięcin
- Wierzchęcino
- Wierzchy
- Wojcieszyn
- Wołowiec
- Wyszomierz
- Żabówko
- Żabowo
- Zagórz
- Zakłodzie
- Zatocze
- Zbyszewice

== Neighbouring gminas ==
Gmina Nowogard is bordered by the gminas of Dobra, Golczewo, Maszewo, Osina, Płoty, Przybiernów, Radowo Małe and Resko.
