= Wierzbięcin, Warmian-Masurian Voivodeship =

Former village in Warmian-Masurian Voivodeship, Poland

Wierzbięcin
- Location within Poland
- Coordinates: 54°18′21″N 20°20′25″E
- Country: Poland
- Voivodeship: Warmian-Masurian
- County: Bartoszyce
- Gmina: Górowo Iławeckie
- Time zone: UTC+1 (CET)
  - Summer (DST): UTC+2 (CEST)
- Vehicle registration: NBA

Wierzbięcin is an abandoned village in the administrative district of Gmina Górowo Iławeckie, in Bartoszyce County, Warmian-Masurian Voivodeship, in northern Poland.

From 1945 to 1958 Wierzbięcin was administratively located in the Iławka County in the Masurian District and Olsztyn Voivodeship.
