= Nowogard =

Town in West Pomeranian Voivodeship, Poland

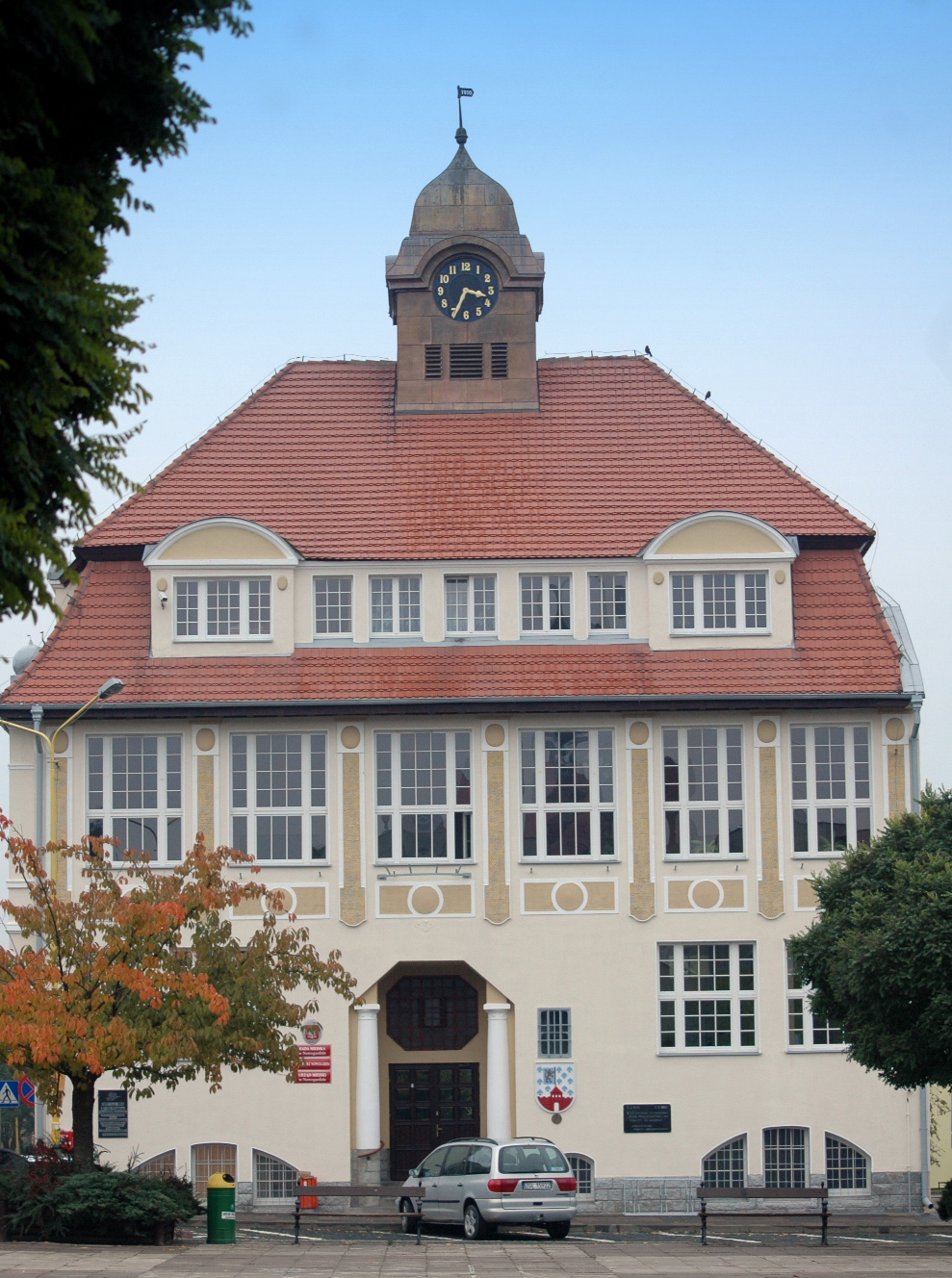
- Town hall in Nowogard

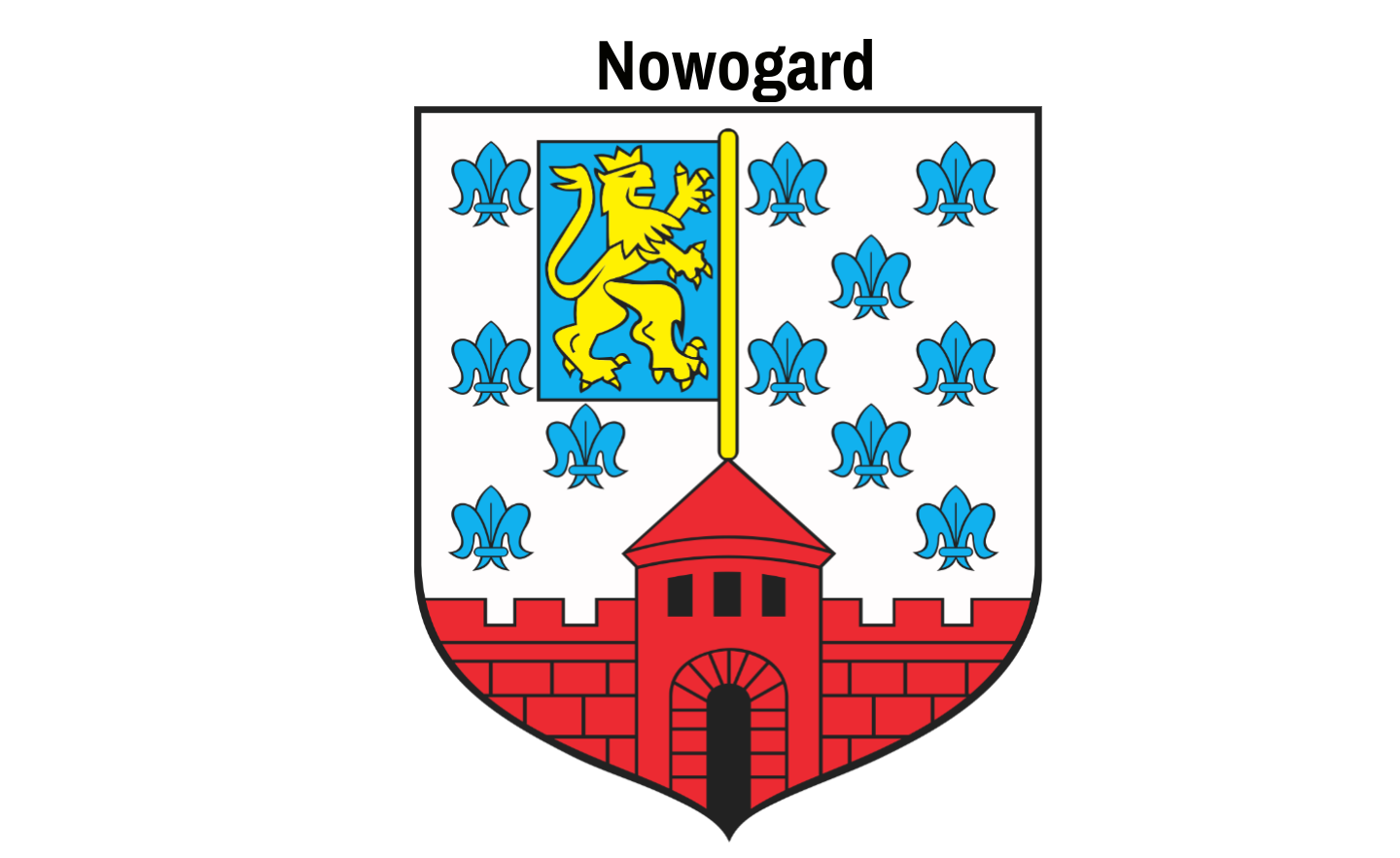
- Flag Coat of arms

- Location within Poland
- Coordinates: 53°40′N 15°7′E
- Country: Poland
- Voivodeship: West Pomeranian
- County: Goleniów
- Gmina: Nowogard
- First mentioned: 1268
- Town rights: 1309

Area
  - Total: 12.46 km^{2} (4.81 sq mi)

Population (2006)
  - Total: 16,745
  - Density: 1,344/km^{2} (3,481/sq mi)
- Time zone: UTC+1 (CET)
  - Summer (DST): UTC+2 (CEST)
- Postal code: 72–200
- Vehicle registration: ZGL
- Website: http://nowogard.pl

Nowogard ([nɔˈvɔɡart]) (Kashubian: Nowògard; German: Naugard) is a town in northwestern Poland, in the West Pomeranian Voivodeship. As of 2004 it had a population of 16,733.

== Name ==
Nowogard is a combination of two Slavic terms: novi (new) and gard, which is Pomeranian for town, city, or fortified settlement. In this capacity, the term gard (or gôrd) is still being used in the only surviving variation of the Pomeranian language, Kashubian.

== Location ==
Nowogard has been situated in Goleniow County of West Pomeranian Voivodship since 1999, but formerly in Szczecin Voivodship from 1975 to 1998. It is located 60 kilometres (37 mi) northeast of Szczecin and 55 kilometres (34 mi) south of the Baltic coast

== History ==
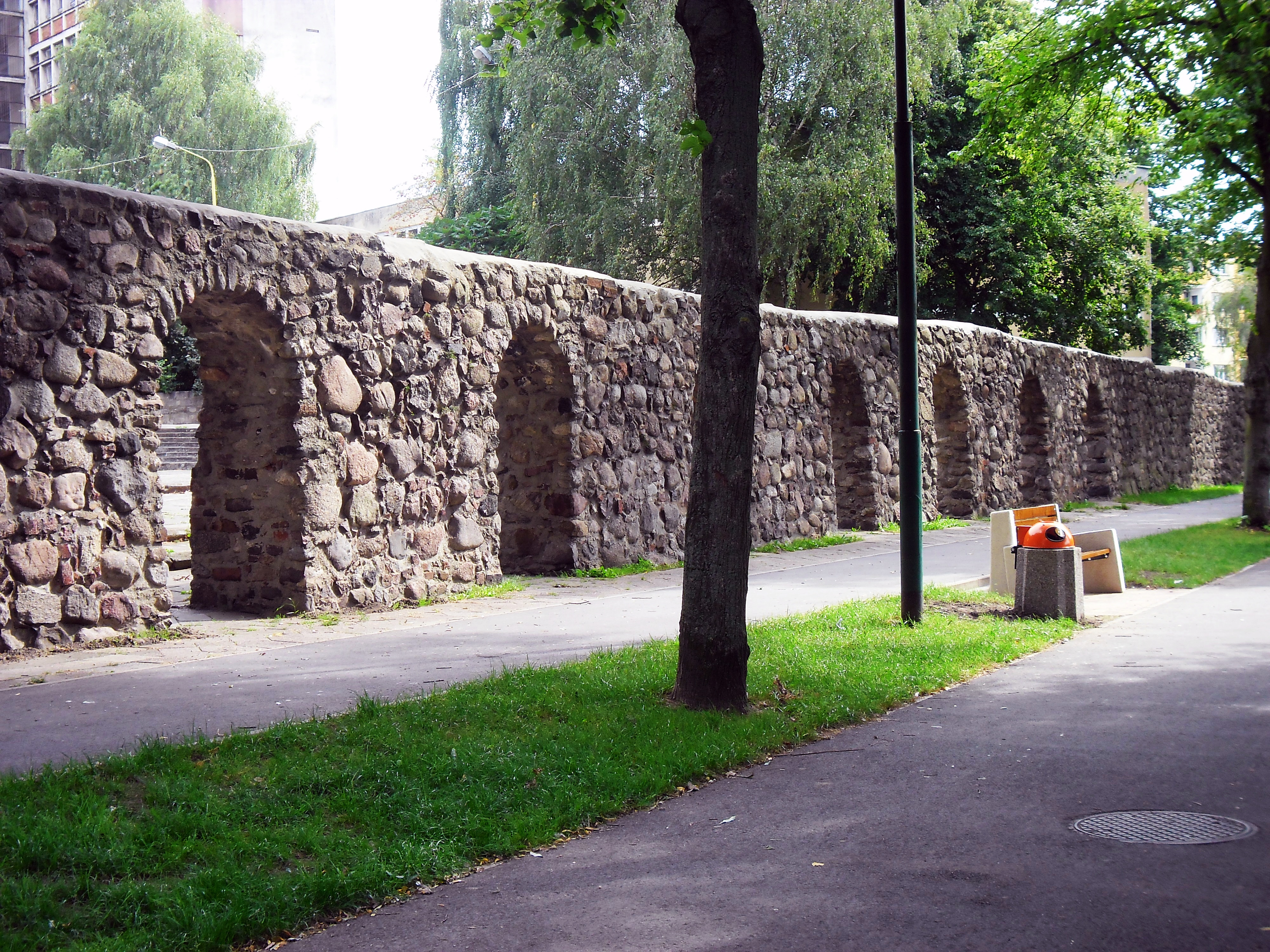
Medieval town walls

In the 10th century the area became part of Poland. Probably then the first Catholic chapel was established in present-day Nowogard. The town's origins go back to a fortified Slavic settlement which was the seat of the local castellan. The settlement was first mentioned in 1268 as "Nogart" when Barnim I, the Duke of Pomerania granted it as a fief to the Bishopric of Cammin (Kamień Pomorski). The bishops erected a castle in the city. In 1274, the town and its surrounding area was administered by Otto von Eberstein, it remained in the possession of the von Eberstein family until 1663. They were a collateral branch of the Counts of Everstein (sometimes also called Eberstein) from Lower Saxony with their ancestral home Everstein Castle on the Burgberg (ridge).

In 1309 the town adopted German municipal law. In the first half of the 14th century, new fortifications were erected with an oblong market square in the center of the town. This is where the town hall and St. Mary's Church were erected.

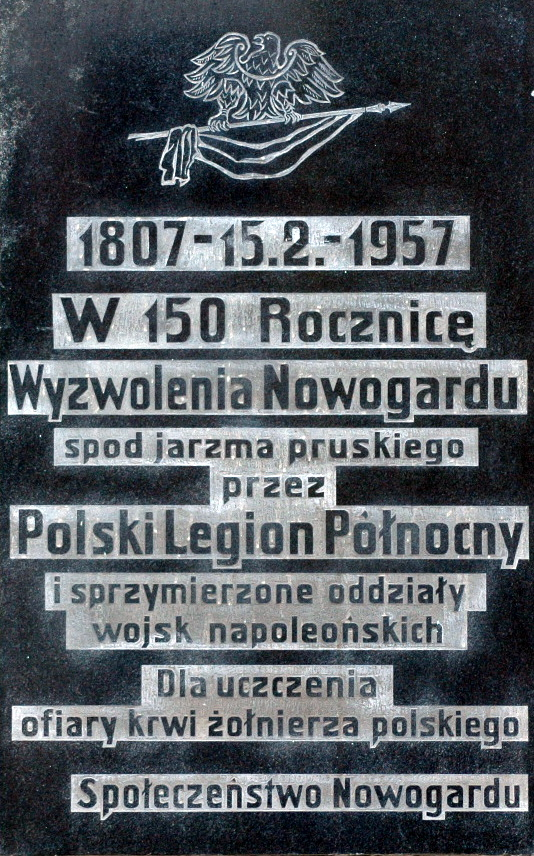
Plaque commemorating the capture of the town by Polish and allied Napoleonic troops in 1807

In 1663, after the death of the last Eberstein, Naugard became property of Ernst Bogislaw von Croÿ and in 1684, property of the electors of Brandenburg. During the Napoleonic Wars, in 1807, the town was captured by allied Polish-French-Italian forces. In the 18th century, the town became part of Prussia, and from 1871 it was also part of Germany.

During World War II many forced labourers of different nationalities were brought to the town by the Germans, there were at least seven forced labour camps for Allied POWs, mostly French and Africans, and there was a Nazi German prison for youth in the town. On 1 March 1945, the Germans committed a massacre of 40 POWs. Throughout the Soviet East Pomeranian Offensive operation of World War II up to 60 percent of the town was destroyed. On 5 March 1945, the town was taken by Polish and Soviet troops. The population fled or was expelled in accordance to the Potsdam Agreement. Following the war, Nowogard became again part of Poland, although with a Soviet-installed communist regime, which stayed in power until the Fall of Communism in the 1980s. It was resettled with Poles. The first new Polish settlers were the freed forced labourers.

In 2016, town limits were slightly expanded by including a part of the village of Miętno.

== Sights ==
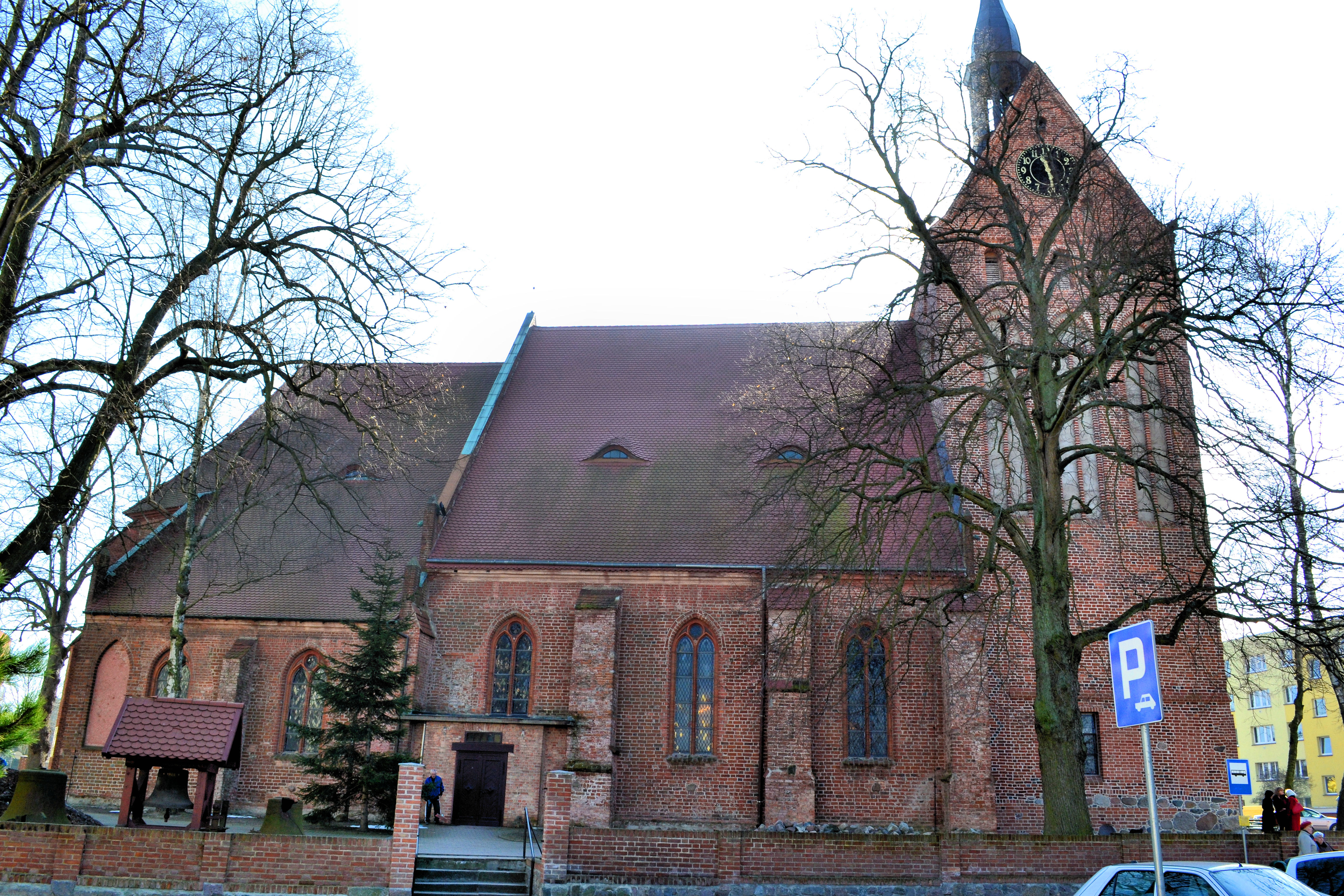
Church of the Assumption

The city's main tourist attraction is a large lake which extends to the center of Nowogard. Its surface covers 1.12 square kilometres (12,100,000 sq ft) with a length of 2,680 metres (8,790 ft) and a width of 620 metres (2,030 ft). Surrounding forests have mushrooms, berries and game. Historic heritage sights include the Gothic Church of the Assumption and medieval town walls.

== Population ==
Historical population

Year	Pop.	±%
1871	4,833	—
1880	4,949	+2.4%
1890	4,872	−1.6%
1900	4,953	+1.7%
1910	5,087	+2.7%
1925	6,409	+26.0%
1933	7,355	+14.8%

Year	Pop.	±%
1939	8,148	+10.8%
1950	4,574	−43.9%
1960	6,533	+42.8%
1970	8,800	+34.7%
1975	9,900	+12.5%
1980	11,300	+14.1%
2010	16,816	+48.8%

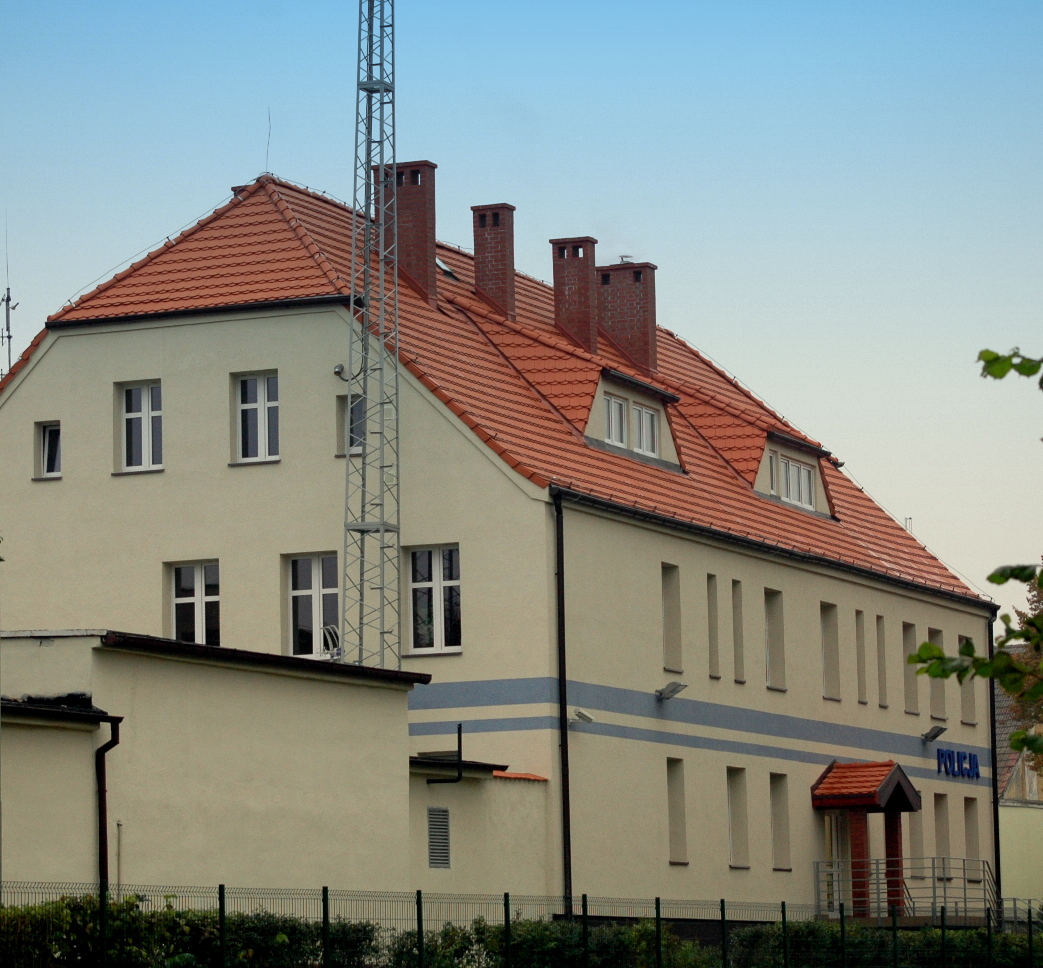
A police station in Nowogard

== Transport ==
The Polish S6 highway acts as a bypass of the town, and the Voivodeship roads (roads of regional importance) 106 and 144 pass through the town. There is also a train station in Nowogard.

== Notable residents ==
- Friedrich Michael Ziegenhagen (1694–1776), German clergyman, court preacher of George I of Great Britain
- Paul Manasse (1866 in Naugard – 1927) a German physician, who specialized in the field of otology
- Zbigniew Szczepkowski (born 1952) a Polish former cyclist, competed in the team pursuit at the 1976 Summer Olympics
- Ewa Durska (born 1977) a two time Paralympic gold medalist, competing mainly in category T20 shot put

== International relations ==
=== Twin towns — sister cities ===
Nowogard is twinned with:

- Gützkow, Germany
- Heide, Germany
- Kävlinge, Sweden
- Veles, North Macedonia

In 1963 West Germany (FRG) town of Heide took over a partnership for the expelled populace of Naugard. In 1996 this led to the signing of a contract of partnership between Heide and Nowogard in which the former populace is regarded "constitutive partners".
