= History of Pomerania (1806–1933) =

History of Pomerania (1806–1933) covers the history of Pomerania from the early 19th century until the rise of Nazi Germany.

The name Pomerania comes from Slavic po more, which means "[land] by the sea".

From the Napoleonic Wars to the end of World War I, Pomerania was administered by the Kingdom of Prussia as the Province of Pomerania (Western (Hither) and Farther Pomerania) and Province of West Prussia (Pomerelia). After World War I Pomerania was divided between Poland and Germany. After the abdication of Wilhelm II as Emperor of Germany and King of Prussia, Western Pomerania was part of the Free State of Prussia within the Weimar Republic, while the eastern part (Pomerelia) became a part of Poland, and organized into the Pomeranian Voivodeship. The Polish Corridor of the Second Polish Republic was established from the bulk of West Prussia, causing an exodus of the German minority there. Poland build a large Baltic port at Gdynia. The Danzig (Gdańsk) area became the city state Free City of Danzig.

The Industrial Revolution primarily affected the Stettin (Szczecin) area and the infrastructure, while most Pomerania retained a rural and agricultural character. Since 1850, the net migration rate was negative, German Pomeranians emigrated primarily to Berlin, the west German industrial regions and overseas. Many also immigrated to the United States, especially the state of Wisconsin, which was founded in 1848.

== Napoleonic Wars and its consequences ==
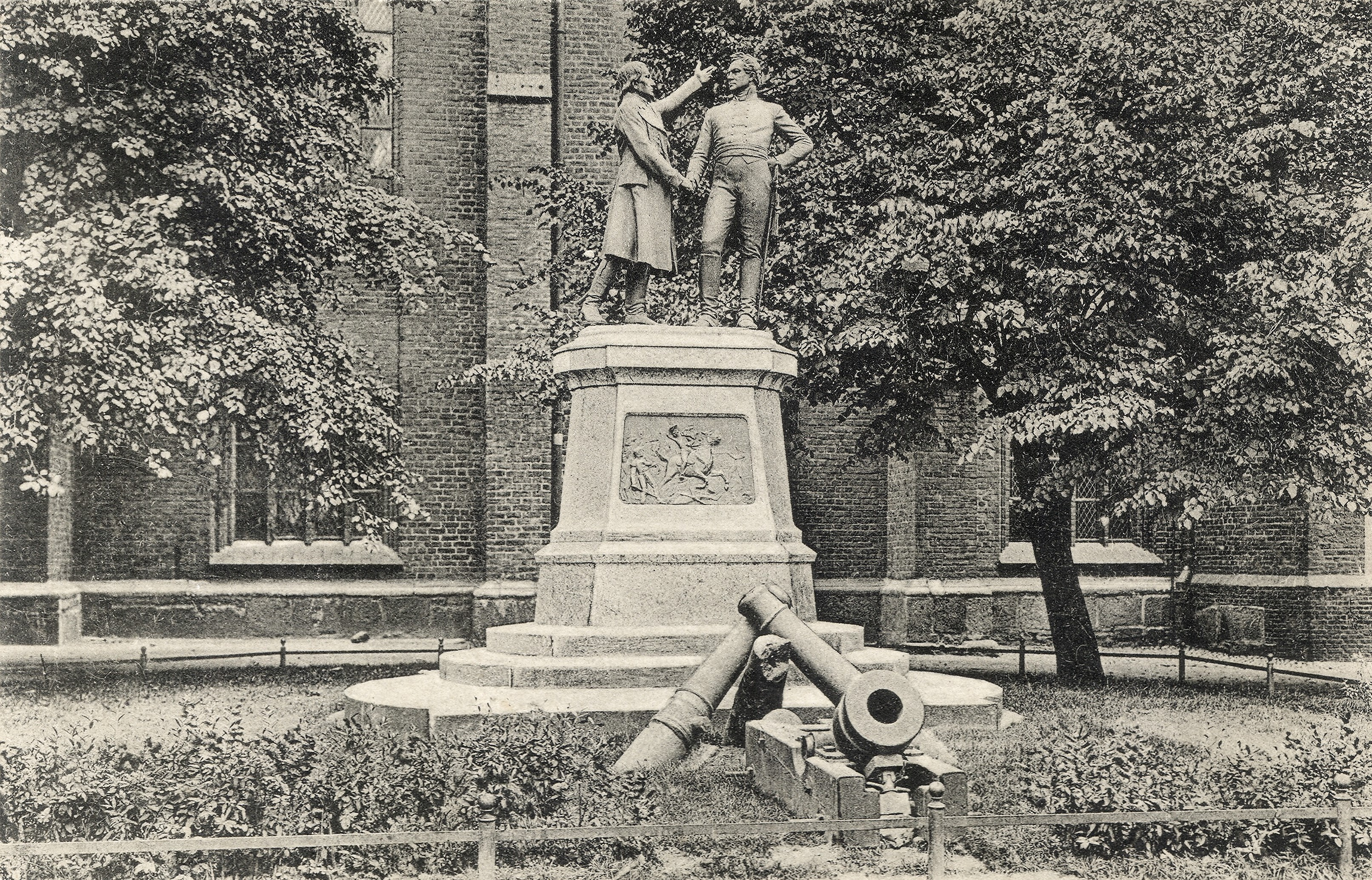
Prussian Field marshal August Neidhardt von Gneisenau congratulates Joachim Nettelbeck for defending Kolberg against the troops of Napoleon Bonaparte. Former memorial from 1904 in Kołobrzeg

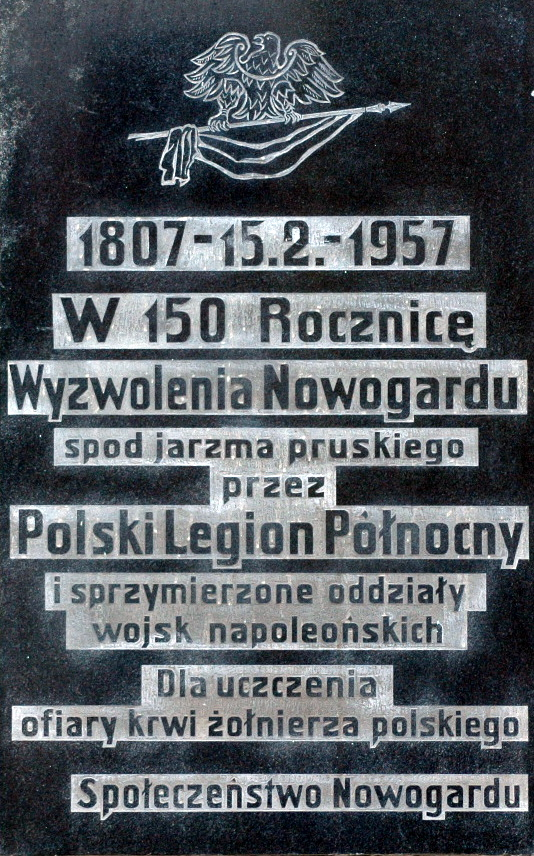
Plaque commemorating the capture of Nowogard by Polish and allied Napoleonic troops in 1807

After Prussia lost the Battle of Jena-Auerstedt in late 1806, French troops marched north into the Pomeranian province. Fortified Stettin (Szczecin) surrendered without battle, and the province became occupied by the French forces. Polish troops took part in the capture of several towns in the region, including Szczecinek and Nowogard. Only fortified Kolberg (Kołobrzeg) resisted, and the French laid a siege in March 1807. Ferdinand von Schill was among the defendants. The siege was not successful and was lifted only when Prussia surrendered to Napoleon Bonaparte in the Peace of Tilsit on July 2.

Napoleonic occupation also thwarted Gustav IV Adolf of Sweden's plans to construct a fortified port city on Rügen, Gustavia. Constructions had begun in 1806, but the unfinished town was levelled by the French forces already in the following year.

The terms of surrender included high war reparations (25,000,000 Taler from the Province of Pomerania alone). The agreed withdrawal of the French troops was delayed repeatedly. In November 1808, the French troops left the province except for Stettin, which forced the provincial government to move to Stargard in 1809. The Kriegs- und Domänenkammer was renamed Royal-Prussian government ("Königlich Preußische Regierung"), while the former government ("Regierung") was renamed Supreme State Court ("Oberlandesgericht").

In 1812, French troops invaded Swedish Pomerania, and also occupied Prussian Pomerania again. The Prussian troops took quarter in Kolberg. After Ludwig Yorck von Wartenburg, who commanded a Prussian corps with a significant Pomeranian share, had left the coalition with France in the Convention of Tauroggen of December 30, 1812, the Prussian military called the Pomeranians to arms in February 1813. Also in February, Russian troops reached Farther Pomerania. In March, all French forces left Pomerania, except for Stettin, which was held by the French until December 5, 1813. After the war, Prussia after diplomatic efforts of Karl August von Hardenberg in the Congress of Vienna gained Swedish Pomerania by paying 2,6 million Taler to Denmark and granting her the Duchy of Lauenburg, and paying an additional 3,5 million Taler to Sweden on June 7, 1815. On October 23, Swedish Pomerania was merged into the Prussian province, both now constituting the Province of Pomerania.

After Napoleon's break-up of the Holy Roman Empire in 1806, the Western Part was the member of the German Confederation. After foundation of the German Empire of 1871, the whole of Pomerania was included into the newly created state.

== The Pomeranian provinces between 1815 and World War I ==
=== Province of Pomerania before World War I ===
The Province of Pomerania (German: Provinz Pommern) was a province of the Kingdom of Prussia and the Free State of Prussia from 1815 until 1934.

==== Creation and administration of the province within the Kingdom of Prussia ====
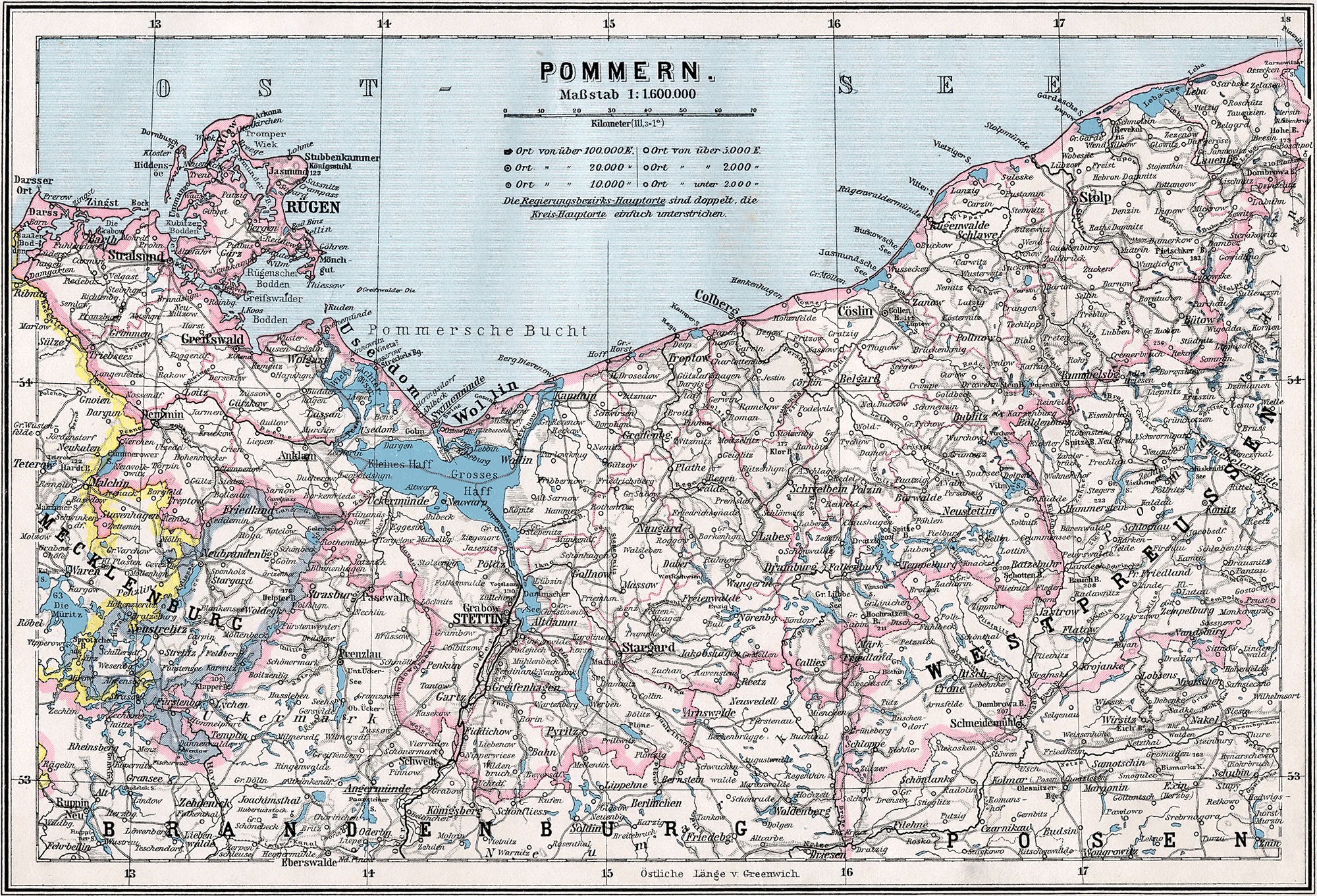
Map of the Prussian Province of Pomerania (Pommern)in 1905

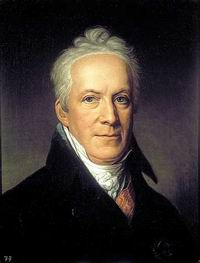
Karl August von Hardenberg

Although there had been a Prussian Province of Pomerania before, the Province of Pomerania was newly reconstituted in 1815, based on the "decree concerning improved establishment of provincial offices" (German: Verordnung wegen verbesserter Einrichtung der Provinzialbehörden), issued by Karl August von Hardenberg on April 30, and the integration of Swedish Pomerania, handed over to Prussia on October 23.

The Hardenberg decree reformed all Prussian territories, which henceforth formed ten (later eight) provinces with similar administration. After the implementation of the reform, the new Province of Pomerania consisted basically of her predecessor and Swedish Pomerania, but also of the Dramburg (Drawsko Pomorskie) and Schivelbein (Świdwin) counties.

The province was headed by a governor (Oberpräsident, literally "superior president") with his seat in the capital, Stettin. It was subdivided into government regions (Regierungsbezirke) headed by a president (Regierungspräsident). Initially, two such regions were planned (Regierungsbezirk Stettin, comprising Western Pomerania, and Regierungsbezirk Köslin, comprising Farther Pomerania). Hardenberg however, who as the Prussian chief diplomat had settled the terms of session of Swedish Pomerania with Sweden at the Congress of Vienna, had assured to leave the local constitution in place when the treaty was signed on June 7, 1815. This circumstance led to a creation of a third government region, Regierungsbezirk Stralsund, for the former Swedish Pomerania at the expense of the Stettin region.

In early 1818, governor Johann August Sack had reformed the county (Kreis) shapes, yet adopted the former shape in most cases. Köslin government region comprised nine counties, Stettin government region thirteen, and Stralsund government region four (identical with the previous Swedish Amt districts).

The new parliament (Landtag) assembled first on October 3, 1824. Based on two laws of June 5 and July, 1823, the Landtag was constituted by 25 lords and knights, 16 representatives of the towns, and eight from the rural communities.

Subordinate to the provincial Landtag were two Kommunallandtag assemblies, one for former Swedish Pomerania (Western Pomerania north of the Peene river) and one for the former Prussian part.

The counties each assembled a Kreisstand, where the knights of the county had a vote each and towns also just one vote.

Throughout its existence, the province was a stronghold of the conservative parties.

==== Reorganisation of Catholic Church institutions in Pomerania ====
With the conversion of most Pomeranians to Lutheranism in the 16th and 17th centuries the Duchy of Pomerania turned into a Catholic diaspora. However, the repopulation policy under Frederick II of Prussia brought about the settlement of Palatine Catholics in Pomerania in 1748. So their three newly founded villages of Blumenthal (a part of today's Ferdinandshof), Hoppenwalde (a part of today's Eggesin) and Viereck formed the first new post-Reformation Catholic congregations in Pomerania. The Catholic Northern Missions took care of Catholic Pomeranians. Between 1709 and 1780 then Brandenburgian Pomerania was part of the Vicariate Apostolic for Upper and Lower Saxony, before this merged into the Vicariate Apostolic of the North, then also comprising other Lutheran states.

The affairs of the Roman Catholic Church in the Kingdom of Prussia had been reorganised by the Bull "De salute animarum", issued in 1821. By that time there were six new Catholic congregations in the Prussian Province of Pomerania, besides the above-mentioned three also one in Demmin, Stettin (est. 1809), and Stralsund (est. 1785). In the eastern, rather newer parts of the province, in the districts of Bütow (Bytów) and Lauenburg (Lębork), which had not been part of the Duchy of Pomerania during the Reformation, the Catholic faith had survived. These districts, however, belonged to the jurisdiction of the Diocese of Culm (Chełmno) (until 1922). In 1821 the rest of Pomerania was disentangled from the Vicariate Apostolic of the North and subordinated to a new jurisdiction of the Diocese of Breslau (Wrocław). This jurisdiction was titled the Prince-Episcopal Delegation for Brandenburg and Pomerania (German: Fürstbischöfliche Delegatur für Brandenburg und Pommern, Polish: Książęco-biskupia Delegatura Brandenburgii i Pomorza), since Emanuel von Schimonsky was invested to Breslau's see under the new honorary rank of prince-bishop in 1824. The delegate resided in Berlin and served in personal union as provost of then St. Hedwig's Church.

Breslau's Prince-Bishop Heinrich Förster (1853–81) gave generous aid to the founding of churches, monastic institutions, and schools, especially in the diaspora regions. Pope Leo XIII appointed as his successor Robert Herzog (1882–86), until then Prince-Episcopal Delegate for Brandenburg and Pomerania.

According to the Prussian Concordat of 1929 Pope Pius XI elevated the Prince-Episcopal Delegation for Brandenburg and Pomerania to the Diocese of Berlin on August 13, 1930, becoming a suffragan of the Diocese of Breslau simultaneously elevated to archdiocese. So all of Pomerania became part of the Eastern German Ecclesiastical Province, with Bütow (Bytów) and Lauenburg (Lębork) being part of the new Territorial Prelature of Schneidemühl (Piła).

==== Infrastructure ====
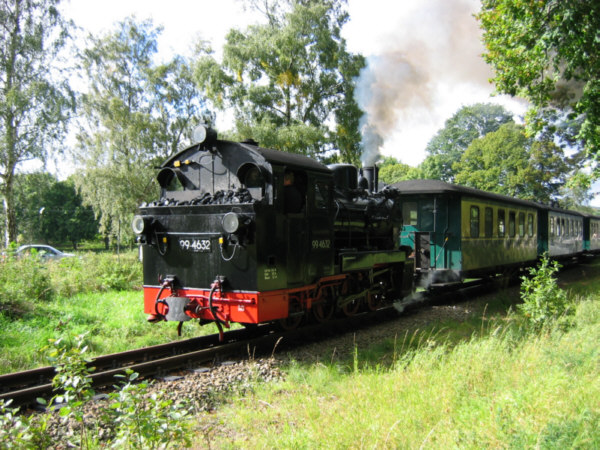
Narrow gauge railway "Rügensche Kleinbahn", operating since 1895

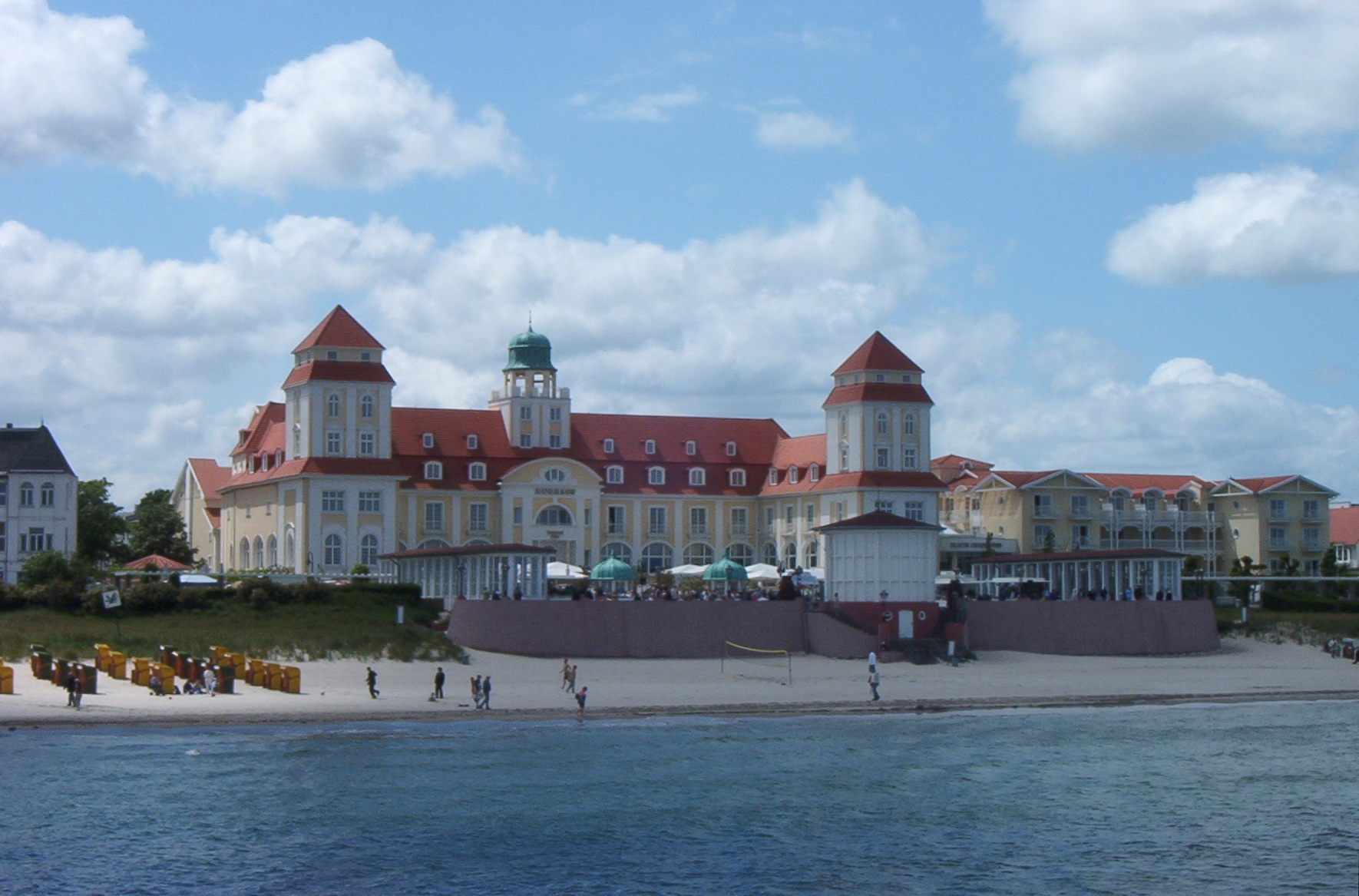
Binz, tourist resort since the 1860s

In the 19th century, the first overland routes ("Chaussee") and railways were introduced in Pomerania. In 1848, 126.8 Prussian miles of new streets had been built. On October 12, 1840, construction of the Berlin–Stettin railway began, which was finished on August 15, 1843. Other railways followed: Stettin-Köslin (1859), Angermünde-Stralsund and Züssow-Wolgast (1863), Stettin- Stolp (1869), and a connection with Danzig (1870).

In rural areas, many narrow-gauge railways were built for faster transport of crops. The first gas, water, and power plants were built. Streets and canalisation of the towns were modernized.

The construction of narrow-gauge railways was enhanced by a special decree of July 28, 1892, implementing Prussian financial aid programs. In 1900, the total of narrow-gauge railways had passed the 1,000 kilometer threshold.

From 1910 to 1912, most of the province was supplied with electricity as the main lines were built. Plants were built since 1898.

The Świna and lower Oder rivers, the major water route to Stettin, were deepened to 5 meters and shortened by a canal (Kaiserfahrt) in 1862. In Stettin, heavy industry was settled, making it the only industrial center of the province.

Stettin was connected to Berlin by the Berlin-Stettin waterway in 1914 after eight years of construction. The other traditional waterways and ports of the province however declined. Exceptions were only the port of Swinemünde (Świnoujście), which was used by the navy, the port of Stolpmünde (Ustka), from which parts of the Farther Pomeranian export was shipped, and the port of Sassnitz, built in 1895 for railway ferries to Scandinavia.

With the infrastructural improvements, mass tourism to the Baltic coast started. The tourist resort ("Ostseebad") Binz had 80 visitors in 1870, 10,000 in 1900, and 22,000 in 1910. The same phenomenon occurred in other tourist resorts.

==== Agricultural reform ====
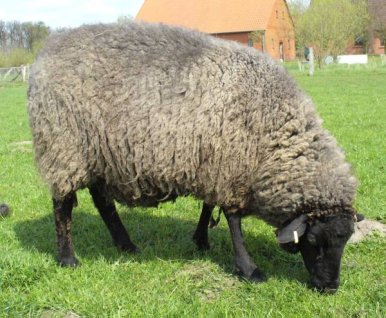
Pomeranian Coarsewool Sheep. Pomerania was the leading Prussian province in sheep breeding.

Already in 1807, Prussia issued a decree ("Steinsches Oktoberedikt") abolishing serfdom. Hardenberg issued a decree on September 14, 1811, defining the terms by which serfs were to be released ("Hardenbergsches Regulierungsedikt"). This could either be done by monetary payment or by letting soil to the former lord. These reforms were applied during the early years of the province's existence. The so-called "regulation" was applied to 10,744 peasants until 1838, who paid their former lords 724,954 Taler and handed over 255,952 hectares of farmland to bail themselves out.

Tumults arose in 1847 in the cities of Stettin (Szczecin) and Köslin (Koszalin) due to food shortages, as a result, prices for some foods were fixed.

On March 2, 1850, a law was passed settling the conditions on which peasants and farmers could capitalize their property rights and feudal service duties, and thus get a long-term credit (41 to 56 years to pay back). This law made way for the establishment of "Rentenbank" credit houses and "Rentengut" farms. Subsequently, the previous rural structure changed dramatically as farmers, who used this credit to bail out their feudal duties, were now able to self-determine how to use their land (so-called "regulated" peasants and farmers, "regulierte Bauern"). This was not possible before, when the jurisdiction had sanctioned the use of farmland and feudal services according not to property rights, but to social status within rural communities and estates.

From 1891 to 1910, 4,731 "Rentengut" farms were set up, most (2,690) with a size of 10 to 25 hectares.

==== Bismarck era administrative reforms ====
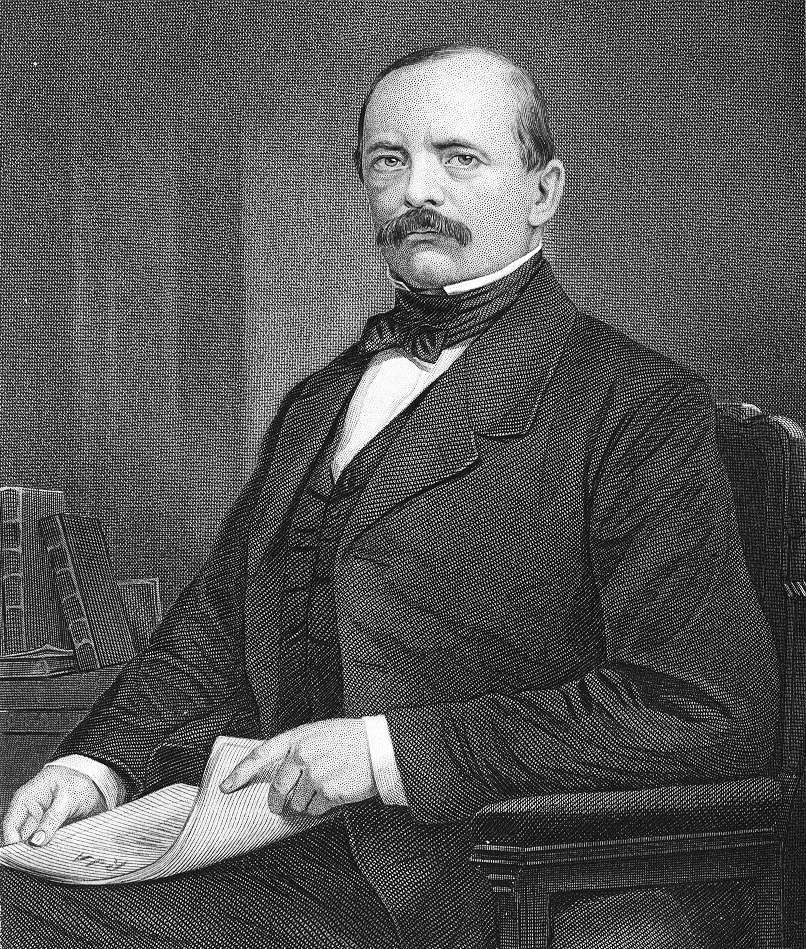
Otto von Bismarck in 1873.

Otto von Bismarck inherited from his father the Farther Pomeranian estates Külz (Kulice), Jarchelin (Jarchlino) and Kniephof (Konarzewo). Aiming at a farming career, he studied agriculture at the academy in Greifswald-Eldena. From 1867 to 1874, he bought and expanded the Varzin (Warcino) estates.

In 1869, Friedrich Albrecht Graf zu Eulenburg drafted a county reform ("Kreisreform") that was promoted by Bismarck. The reform passed the House of Lords on December 7, 1872. Most important, the reform cut the linkage between noble status and the right to vote, the latter now depended on property (one had to be above a certain tax threshold) and not on status, aiming against the overrepresentation of the knights compared to burghers.

On June 29, 1875, a new constitution for the province was passed ("Provinzialordnung"), which entered into force in 1876. It redefined the responsibilities of the provincial administration (headed by the Oberpräsident) and the self-administrative institutions ("Provinzialverband", comprising the provincial parliament ("Provinziallandtag"), a "Landeshauptmann" (head) and a "Landesausschuß" (commission)). The Provinzialverband was financed directly from the Prussian state budget. The Landtag was responsible for streets, welfare, education, and culture. Landownership was not a criterion to become elected anymore. The provincial Landtag (Provinziallandtag) was elected by the county representative assemblies ("Kreistag" for counties, "Stadtverordnetenversammlung" for town districts) for a six years' term. A subordinate Kommunallandtag only existed for Regierungsbezirk Stralsund, until it was abolished in 1881.

In 1891, a county reform was passed, allowing more communal self-government. Municipalities hence elected a "Gemeindevorstand" (head) and a "Gemeindevertretung" (communal parliament). Gutsbezirk districts, i.e. estates not included in counties, could be merged or dissolved.

==== Effect of Treaty of Versailles on territorial size ====
In contrast to the provinces of West Prussia and East Prussia, the Peace Treaty of Versailles of 1919 had comparatively little influence on the territorial size of the province of Pomerania. In the framework of the treaty some parts of the eastern rural administrative districts of Landkreis Bütow, Landkreis Lauenburg and Landkreis Stolp, amounting to altogether 9,64 km^{2}, where in 1910 a population of 224 inhabitants had been counted, went lost to Poland.

==== Administrative subdivisions ====
Until 1932, the province was subdivided into the government regions (Regierungsbezirk) Köslin (Eastern part, Farther Pomerania), Stettin (Southwestern part, Old Western Pomerania or Altvorpommern), and Stralsund (Northwestern part, New Western Pomerania or Neuvorpommern). The Stralsund region was merged into the Stettin region in 1932. The provincial capital was Stettin (Szczecin), the Regierungsbezirk capitals were Köslin (Koszalin), Stettin, and Stralsund, respectively.

=== Demographics of Province of Pomerania ===
Mother Tongues of the Province of Pomerania, according to the 1905 Census

==== Number on inhabitants in years ====
- 1905: 1,684,326 (56 per km^{2}), among them 1,616,550 Protestants, 50,206 Catholics, and 9,660 Jews.
- 1925: 1,878,780

==== Languages ====
- 1900: The native language of the vast majority of the population was German; in the neighbourhood of the border to the Province of West Prussia there lived 14,162 persons using Polish as the language of communication, and (in the vicinity of the Leba Lake and of the Garde Lake) 310 persons whose mother tongue was Kashubian.

=== Province of West Prussia ===
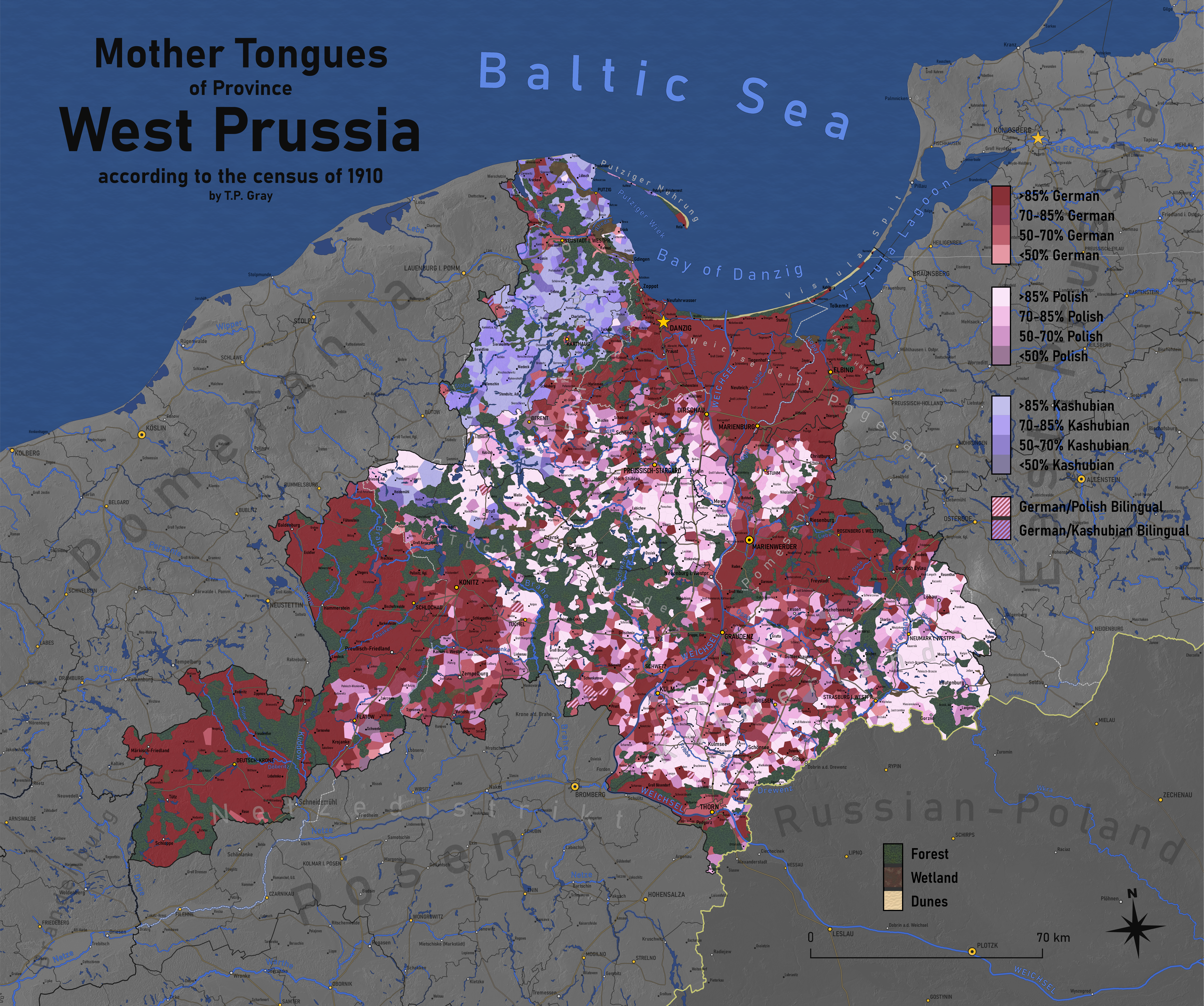
Mother Tongues of the Province of West Prussia, according to the 1910 Census

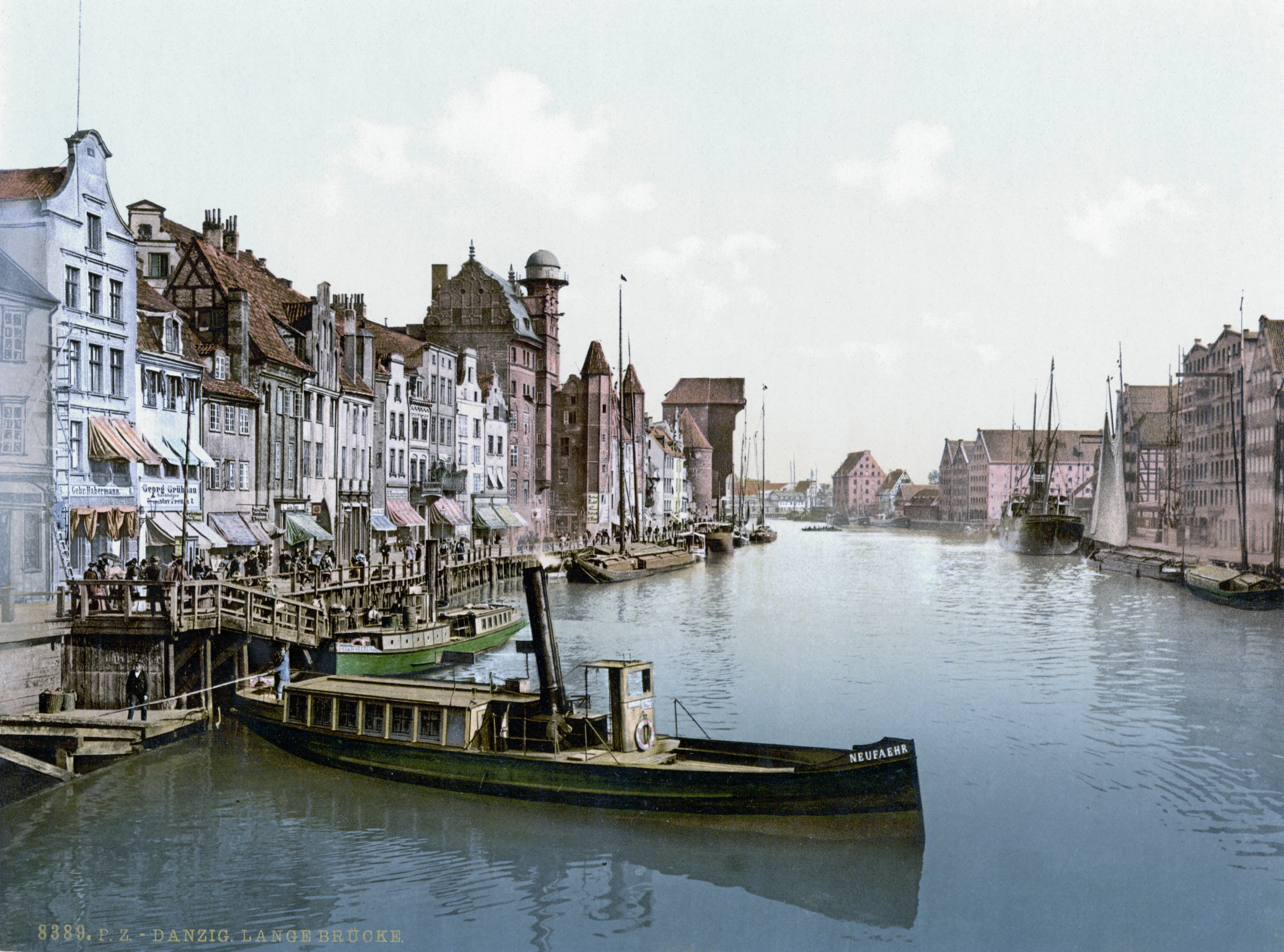
Photochrome print of Gdańsk from around 1900

From 1807–1813 during the Napoleonic Wars, southern parts of West Prussia were added to the Duchy of Warsaw, a Napoleonic client state. In 1815 the province, restored to the Kingdom of Prussia, was administratively subdivided into the Regierungsbezirke Danzig and Marienwerder. From 1829 to 1878 West Prussia was combined with East Prussia to form the Province of Prussia, after which they were reestablished as separate provinces. The region became part of the German Empire in 1871 during the unification of Germany.

Since the 1820s, the Wisłoujście Fortress served as a prison, mainly for Polish political prisoners, including resistance members, protesters, insurgents of the November and January uprisings and refugees from the Russian Partition of Poland fleeing conscription into the Russian Army, and insurgents of the November Uprising were also imprisoned in Biskupia Górka. In May–June 1832 and November 1833, more than 1,000 Polish insurgents departed partitioned Poland through the port of Gdańsk, boarding ships bound for France, the United Kingdom and the United States (see Great Emigration).

Prussia and Germany enacted Germanisation policies. From 1866 Polish teachers were relocated to Germany. In 1873, teaching in German was made compulsory in all subjects except religion and singing. From 1877 teachers were forbidden to belong to Polish organisations. In 1901, Polish-language religion lessons were also abolished. In 1906–1907, Polish children in various towns and villages joined the children school strikes against Germanisation that spread throughout the Prussian Partition of Poland.

Chojnice became a center of Polish youth resistance to Germanisation with secret organizations of local high school students and some Poles joining the Polish uprisings of 1830 and 1863 in the Russian Partition of Poland. In 1911 the first Polish secret scout troop in the Prussian Partition of Poland was established in Chojnice.

==== Population ====
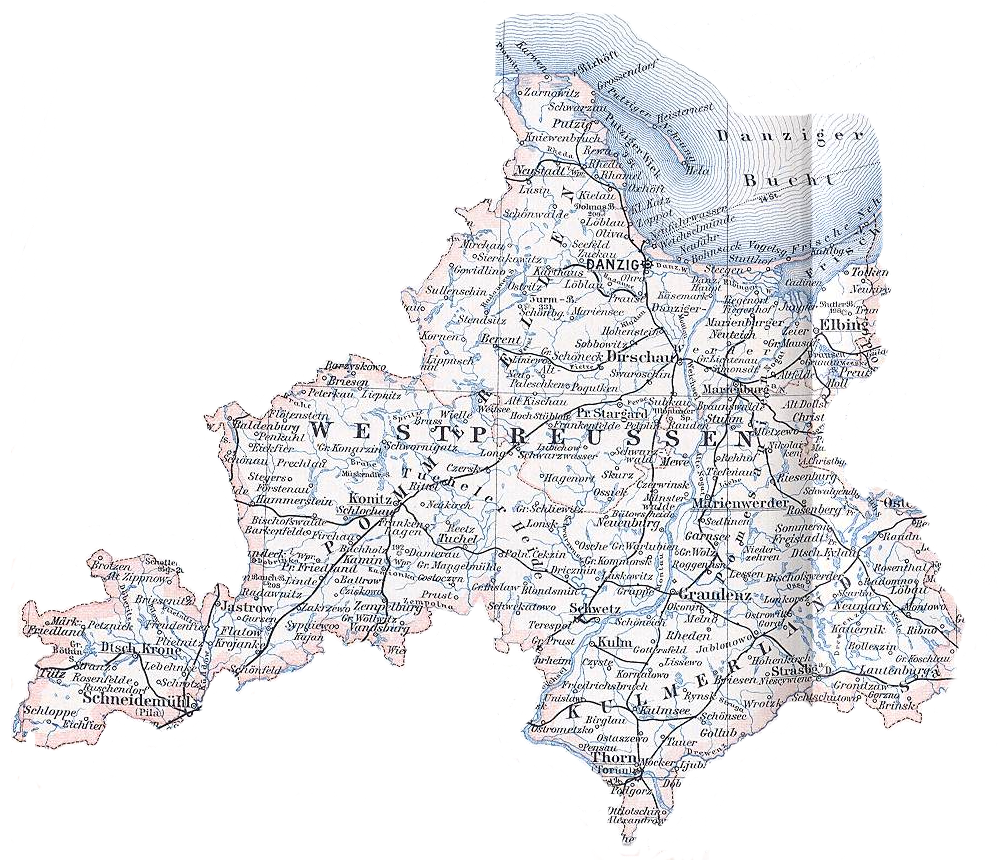
Map of West Prussia and the Bay of Gdańsk in 1896

Ethnic composition of West Prussia
year	1858	1890	1905	1910
total population	?	1.433.681	1.641.936	?
% Poles (including Kashubians)	30,9%	33,8%	34,4%	~35%
% Germans * ^{including bilinguals}	69,1%	66,2%*	65,6%*	~65%

- 1875 – 1,343,057
- 1880 – 1,405,898
- 1890 – 1,433,681 (717,532 Catholics, 681,195 Protestants, 21,750 Jews, others)
- 1900 – 1,563,658 (800,395 Catholics, 730,685 Protestants, 18,226 Jews, others)
- 1905 – 1,641,936 (including 437,916 Poles, 99,357 Kashubians)

== World War I and aftermath ==
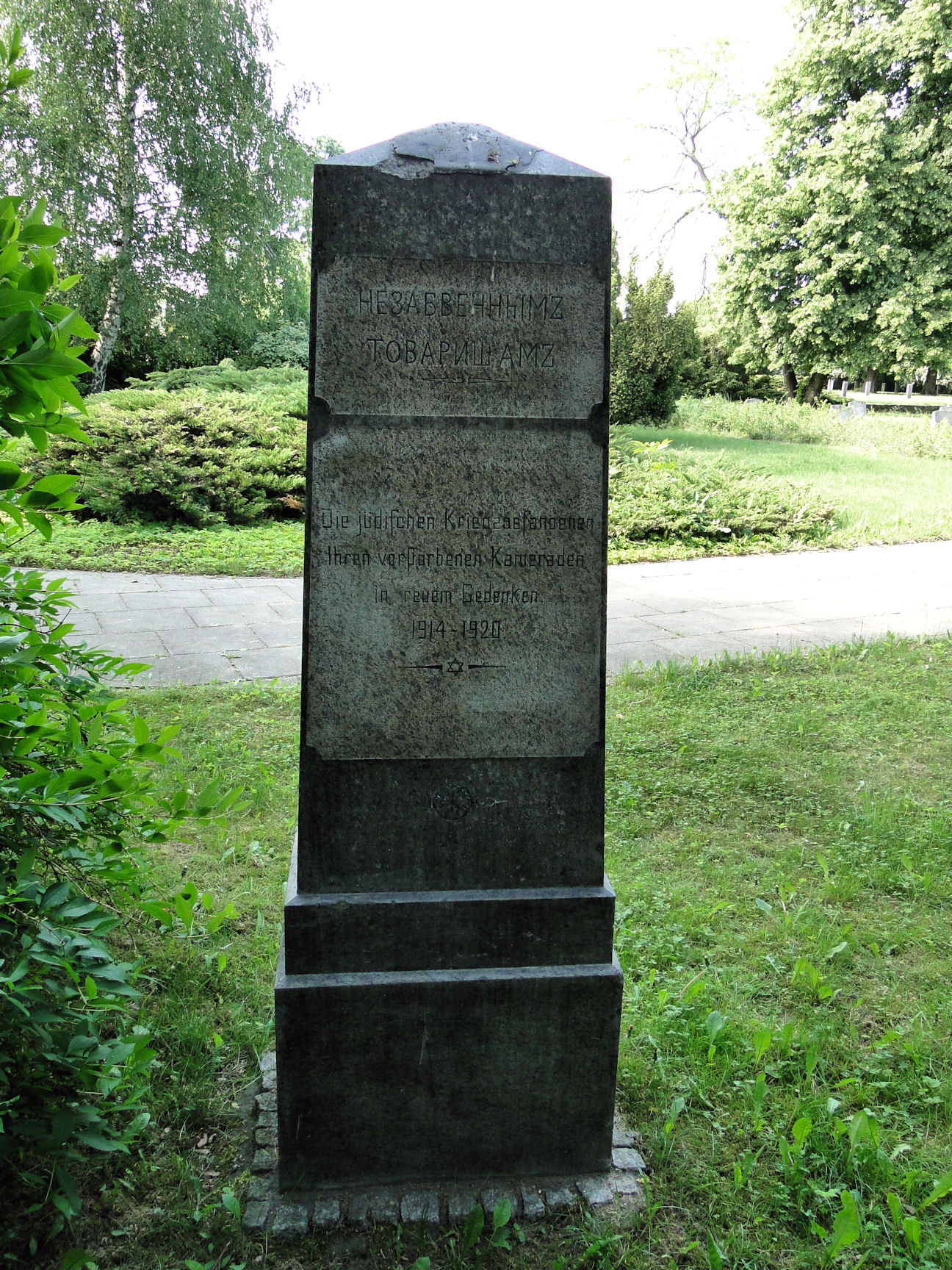
Memorial at the War Cemetery in Stargard

During World War I, the German government operated prisoner-of-war camps in several locations in Pomerania, including Stargard and Czarne, for Allied POWs of various nationalities, including Russian (including ethnic Polish conscripts from the Russian Partition of Poland), French, Belgian, American, English, Serbian, Romanian, Portuguese, Italian and Japanese.

In 1918 and 1919, Poles in various locations began preparations to rejoin Poland, with the establishment of Polish councils and organization of Polish rallies, to which Germany responded with repressions of Poles. In 1919, local Poles took control of the towns of Czersk and Gniew. Following a battle, the Germans recaptured Czersk and arrested prominent Poles, however, the Polish resistance remained active until the town was finally restored to Poland.

As a result of the Versailles Peace Treaty (1919) after World War I, Pomerania was divided between Poland and Germany. Most of the German-Prussian province of West Prussia became again part of Poland as the so-called Polish Corridor, and constituted the Pomeranian Voivodeship (województwo pomorskie) with the capital at Toruń. The western remainder were merged into Posen-West Prussia in 1922, while the eastern remainder became part of Regierungsbezirk West Prussia within East Prussia. The Danzig (Gdańsk) area was made the Free City of Danzig.

=== Polish Corridor ===
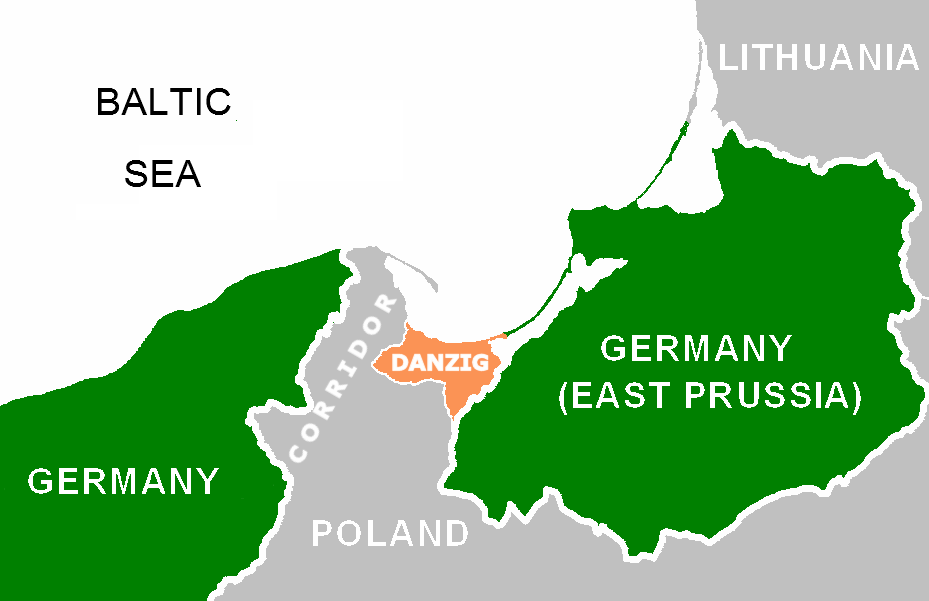
The Polish Corridor in 1923–1939

In the course of the reestablishment of the previously partitioned Polish state as a result of the Treaty of Versailles, the Polish corridor" was established from 70% of the dissolved former province of West Prussia, comprising Pomerelian areas and the Chełmno Land. It cut Germany off from her province of East Prussia while at the same time it allowed interwar Poland access to the Baltic Sea. Within Poland the corridor mostly constituted the Pomeranian Voivodeship (województwo pomorskie). The term was first used by Polish politicians and came into international use.

After the seaport workers of the Free City of Danzig harbour went on strike throughout the Polish-Soviet War the Polish Government decided to build a new seaport at Gdynia in the territory of the Corridor. A large part of the German population of the Polish Corridor left the area after its cession to the Second Polish Republic in June 1919. Poland took over complete control on January 20, 1920. Those people who wanted to stay in their hometowns had to take Polish citizenship, as Poland refused to accept German citizens living in its territory. Former public officials were not accepted as Polish citizens and had to leave the area. Other people, declining to give up German citizenship, had also to leave the Corridor. Due to the reduced population German schools were closed and property of former Germans residents was confiscated.

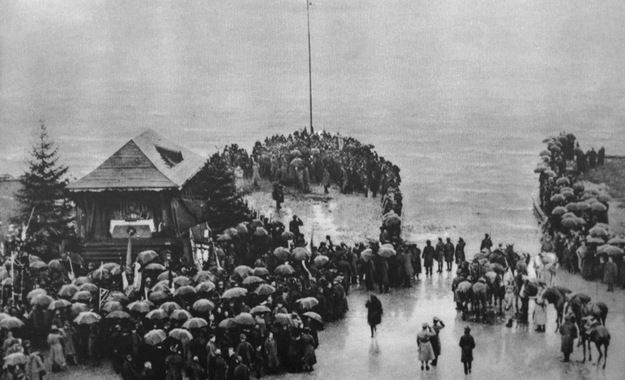
Poland's Wedding to the Sea in Puck in 1920

Throughout the East Prussian plebiscite in July 1920 Polish authorities tried to prevent traffic through the Corridor, interrupting any postal, telegraphic and telephonic communication. On March 10, 1920, the British representative on the Marienwerder Plebiscite Commission, H.D. Beaumont, wrote of numerous continuing difficulties being made by Polish officials and added "as a result, the ill-will between Polish and German nationalities and the irritation due to Polish intolerance towards the German inhabitants in the Corridor (now under their rule), far worse than any former German intolerance of the Poles, are growing to such an extent that it is impossible to believe the present settlement (borders) can have any chance of being permanent.... It can confidently be asserted that not even the most attractive economic advantages would induce any German to vote Polish. If the frontier is unsatisfactory now, it will be far more so when it has to be drawn on this side (of the river) with no natural line to follow, cutting off Germany from the riverbank and within a mile or so of Marienwerder, which is certain to vote German. I know of no similar frontier created by any treaty."

Due to these difficulties, ongoing after the East Prussian Plebiscite ended with a significant German success, the German Ministry for Transport established the Seedienst Ostpreußen ("Sea Service East Prussia") in 1922 to provide a ferry connection to the German exclave of East Prussia, independent of transit through Polish territory.

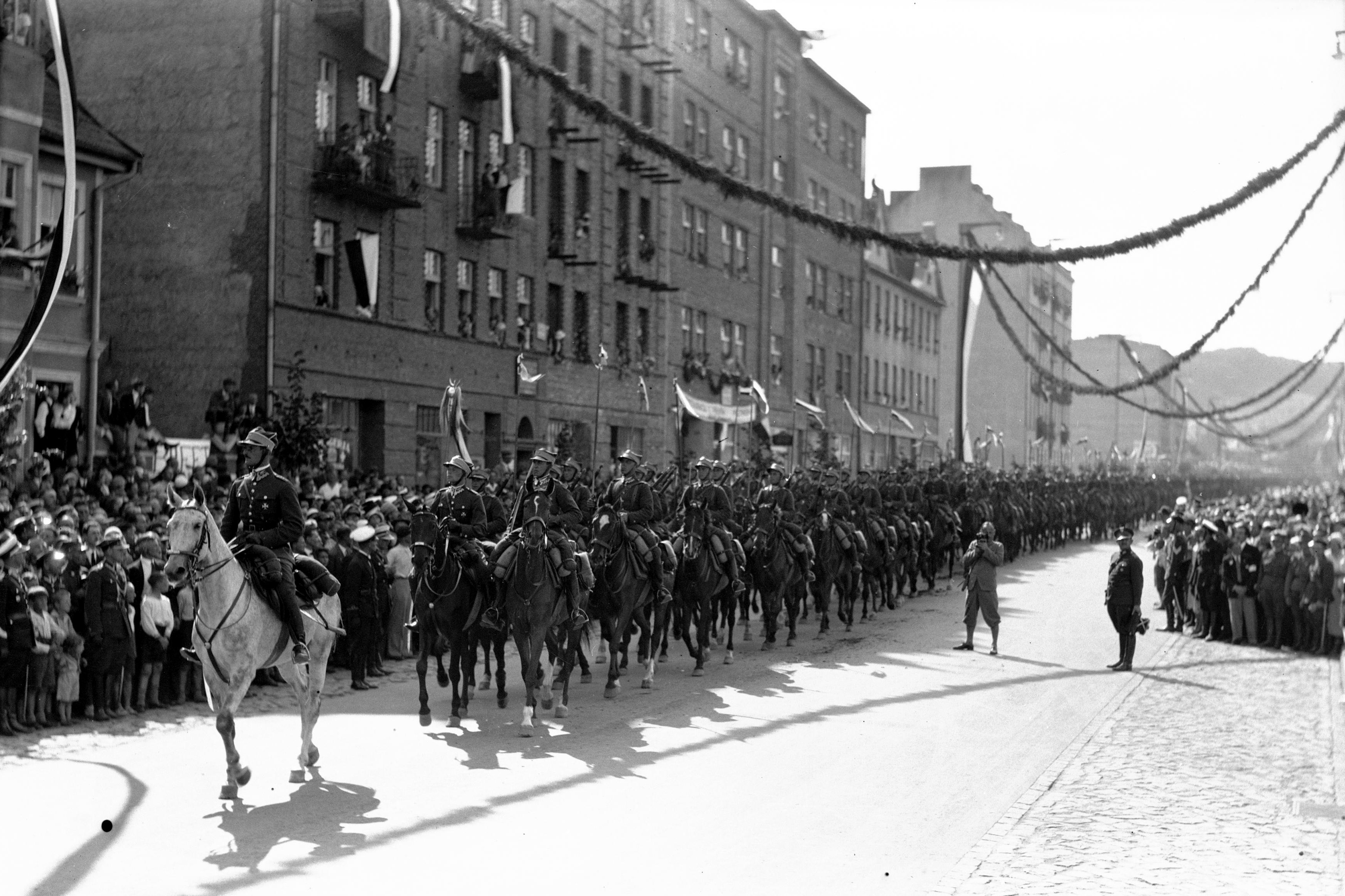
Military parade during the Sea Holiday in Gdynia in 1932

==== Land reform ====
In 1925, the Polish government enacted a land reform program intended to redistribute land from large landowners to small farmers. Because German landowners generally owned the biggest tracts of land, they were the first to be affected. The Polish voivode, Wiktor Lamot, stressed that "the part of Pomorze through which the so-called Corridor runs must be cleansed of larger German holdings." Because the German landholders who had remained in the Polish part of Pomerania resented their loss of status and the privileged position they had enjoyed before the land reform, they then became nationalistic and anti-Polish in their outlook.

==== Ethnic composition ====
Most of the area was inhabited by Poles, Germans, and Kashubians. Since 1886, a Settlement Commission was set up by Prussia to enforce German settlement while at the same time Germans migrated west during the Ostflucht. In 1910 42,5% of the population was German (421,029 Germans) including German soldiers stationed in the area and public officials sent to administrate the area. In 1921 Germans counted 18,8% (175,771). Over the next decade, the German population decreased by another 70,000 to a share of 9,6%. Also, there was a Jewish minority. in 1905, Kashubians numbered about 72,500.

===== Exodus of the German minority =====
The Versailles treaty had stipulated that Germans in the part of German Reich territory to be ceded to Poland had until 1922 to make the choice for Polish or German citizenship.

The book, Orphans of Versailles, states that as result of disloyalty of German citizens, who openly expressed their joy at Polish defeats in Polish-Soviet war, "Other places witnessed violent demonstrations against the minority; in Chełmno, the Starost reportedly encouraged Poles, 'If a German or Jew dares to say anything against the Polish State, [to] tie him up and drag him through the streets to the starost's office or to the court.' Although the Versailles Treaty gave Germans until January 1922 to make their choice for Polish or German citizenship, many were compelled to declare right away, either for Germany (and expulsion) or for Poland and induction into the Polish army." In one village, four Germans were killed in mob violence and numerous others arrested on basis of denunciations by Polish neighbors.

In addition, the area was abandoned by numerous Germans (a number estimated at 10% of Germans) who were public officials and other workers with no ties to the province or military personnel (German garrisons were included in Prussian censuses as part of population).

=== Free City of Danzig ===
The Free City of Danzig included the major city of Danzig (Gdańsk) as well as Zoppot (Sopot), Tiegenhof (Nowy Dwór Gdański), Neuteich (Nowy Staw) and some 252 villages and 63 hamlets. Covering a total area of 1,966 square kilometers (754 sq mi), the territory was roughly twice the size of the Napoleonic statelet.

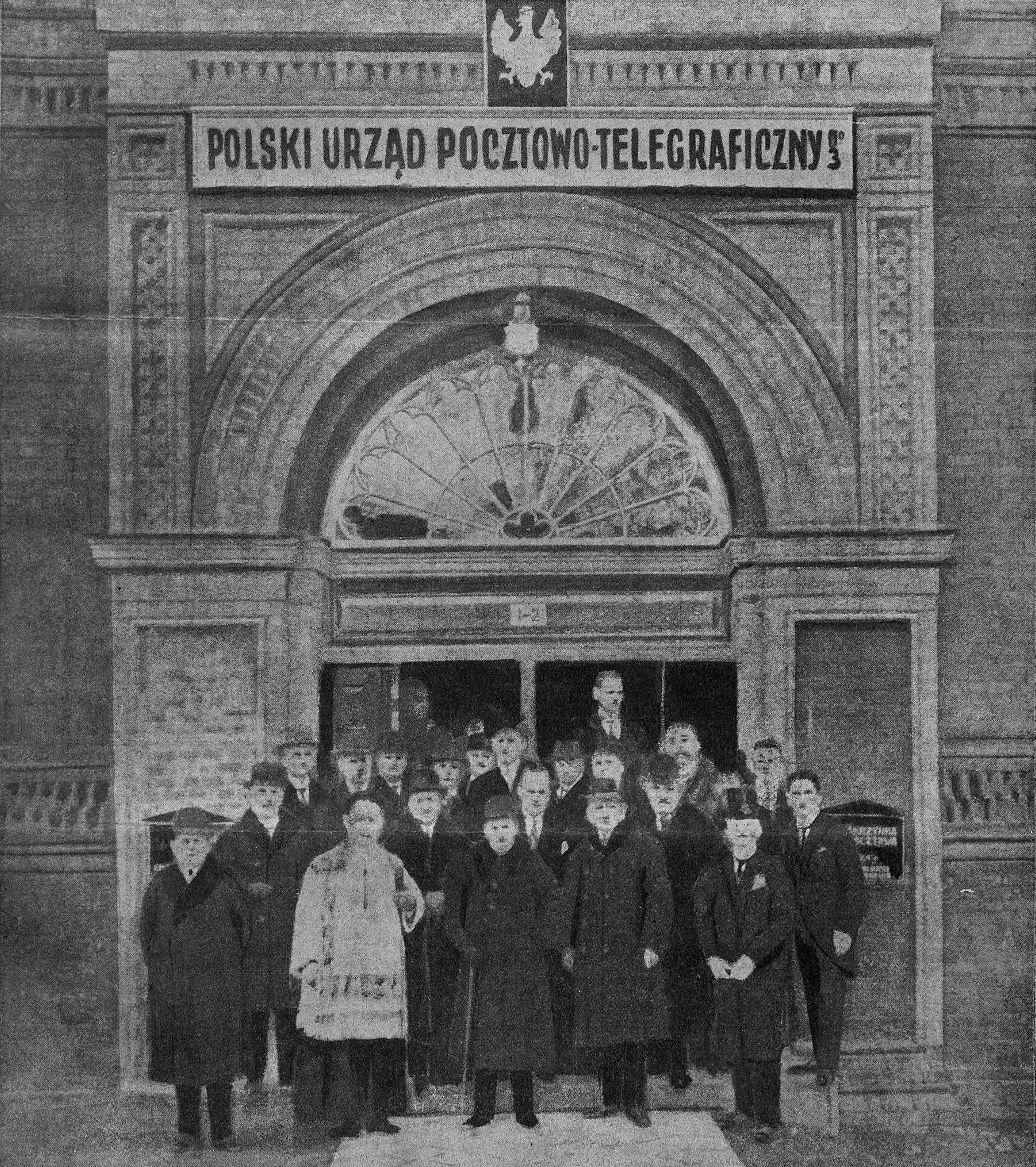
Opening of the Polish Post Office No. 3 in Gdańsk in 1925

The Free City was to be represented abroad by Poland and be in a customs union with it. This arrangement was inspired by the history of the city, which for hundreds of years was part of Poland, with which it shared economic interests, thanks to which it flourished, and within which it enjoyed autonomy. The German railway line that connected the Free City with newly created Poland was to be administered by Poland. Similarly, the Westerplatte (until then a city beach), was also given to Poland, which created a military post within the city's harbour. There was also a separate Polish post-office established besides the existing municipal one.

Unlike mandated territories, which were entrusted to member countries, Danzig like the Territory of the Saar Basin remained under the authority of the League of Nations itself, with representatives of various countries taking on the role of High Commissioner:

==== Population ====
The Free City had a population of 357,000 (1919), 95% of whom were German-speakers, with the rest mainly speaking either Kashubian or Polish.

The Treaty of Versailles, which had severed Danzig and surrounding villages from Germany, now required that the newly formed state had its own citizenship, based on residency. German inhabitants lost their German nationality with the creation of the Free City, but were given the right within the first two years of the state's existence to re-obtain it; however, if they did so they were required to leave their property and make their residence outside of the Free State of Danzig area in the remaining part of Germany.

It became clear almost at once that the overwhelming German majority population of the Free State resented the concessions which had been made to Poland and their dismemberment from Germany. Professor Burckhardt, the League of Nations' High Commissioner in Danzig found, by 1939, his position as absolute arbiter in the endless disputes almost untenable.

=== Province of Pomerania ===
During the First World War, no battles took place in the province.

Nevertheless, the war affected society, economy, and administration. During the war, the provincial administrative institutions were subordinate to the military and headed by military officials. Mobilization resulted in work force shortage affecting all non-war-related industry, construction, and agriculture. Women, minors and POWs partially replaced the drafted men. Import and fishing declined when the ports were blocked. With the war going on, food shortages occurred, especially in the winter of 1916/17. Also coal, gas, and electricity were at times unavailable.

When the Treaty of Versailles entered into force on January 10, 1920, the province's eastern frontier became the border to the newly created Second Polish Republic, comprising most of Pomerelia in the so-called Polish Corridor. Minor border adjustments followed, where 9,5 km^{2} of the province became Polish and 74 km^{2} of former West Prussia (parts of the former counties of Neustadt in Westpreußen and Karthaus) were merged into the province.

==== Province of the Free State of Prussia ====
After the German Emperor was forced to resign, the province became part of the Free State of Prussia within the Weimar Republic.

===== German Revolution of 1918–1919 =====
During the German Revolution of 1918–1919, revolutionary councils of soldiers and workers took over the Pomeranian towns (Stralsund on November 9, Stettin, Greifswald, Pasewalk, Stargard, and Swinemünde on November 10, Barth, Bütow, Neustettin, Köslin, and Stolp on November 11). On January 5, 1919, workers' and soldiers' councils ("Arbeiter- und Soldatenräte") were in charge of most of the province (231 towns and rural municipalities). The revolution was peaceful, no riots are reported. The councils were led by Social Democrats, who cooperated with the provincial administration. Of the 21 Landrat officials, only five were replaced, while of the three heads of the government regions ("Regierungspräsident") two were replaced (in Stralsund and Köslin) in 1919.

On November 12, 1918, a decree was issued allowing farmworkers' unions to negotiate with farmers (Junkers). The decree further regulated work time and wages for farmworkers.

On May 15, 1919, street fights and plunder occurred following Communist assemblies in Stettin. The revolt was put down by the military. In late August, strikes of farmworkers occurred in the counties of Neustettin (Szczecinek) and Belgard (Białogard). The power of the councils however declined, only a few were left in the larger towns in 1920.

===== Counter-revolution =====
Conservative and right-wing groups evolved in opposition to the revolutions achievements. Landowners formed the Pommerscher Landbund in February 1919, which by 1921 had 120,000 members and from the beginning was supplied with arms by the 2nd army corps in Stettin. Paramilitias ("Einwohnerwehr") formed throughout the spring of 1919.

Pommerscher Landbund units participated in the nationalist Kapp Putsch in Berlin, 1920.

Members of the "Iron Division" ("Eiserne Division"), a dissolved Freikorps in the Baltic, reorganized in Pomerania, where the Junkers hosted them on their estates as a private army.

Also, counter-revolutionary Pomeranians formed Freikorps participating in fights in the Ruhr area.

===== Constitution of 1920 =====
In 1920 (changed in 1921 and 1924), the Free State of Prussia adopted a democratic constitution for her provinces. The constitution granted a number of civil rights to the Prussian population and enhanced the self-government of the provinces.

The provincial and county parliaments (Landtag and Kreistag) were hence elected directly by the population, including women, in free and secret votes.

The "Provinzialverband", which included all self-governmental institutions of the province such as the provincial parliament ("Provinziallandtag"), gained influence on the formerly Berlin-led provincial government: The Provinzialverband would hence elect the "Oberpräsident" (head of the administration) and appoint representatives for the Reichsrat assembly in Berlin. Furthermore, the Provinzialverband officials could hence self determine how to spend the money they received from Berlin.

===== Economy =====
The border changes however caused a severe decline in the province's economy. Farther Pomerania was cut off from Danzig (Gdańsk) by the corridor. Former markets and supplies in the now Polish territories became unavailable.

Farther Pomeranian farmers had sold their products primarily to the eastern provinces, that were now part of the Second Polish Republic. Due to high transport costs, the markets in the West were unavailable too. The farmers reacted by modernizing their equipment, improving the quality of their products, and applying new technical methods. As a consequence, more than half of the farmers were severely indebted in 1927. The government reacted with the Osthilfe program, and granted credits to favourable conditions.

Stettin particularly suffered from a post-war change in trade routes. Before the territorial changes, it had been on the export route from the Katowice industrial region in now Polish Upper Silesia. Poland changed this export route to a new inner-Polish railway connecting Katowice with the new-build port of Gdynia within the corridor.

As a counter-measure, Prussia invested in the Stettin port since 1923. While initially successful, a new economical recession led to the closure of one of Stettin's major shipyard, Vulcan-Werft, in 1927.

The province also reacted to the availability of new traffic vehicles. Roads were developed due to the upcoming cars and buses, four towns got electric street cars, and an international airport was built in Altdamm (Dąbie) near Stettin (Szczecin).

The Pomeranian agriculture underwent a crisis. Programs were started to regain soil that had turned into swamps during the wartime, and even to establish new settlements by setting up settlement societies. The results were mixed. On the one hand, 130,858 hectare of farmland were settled with 8,734 new-build settlements until 1933. The settlers originated in Pomerania itself, Saxony and Thuringia, also refugees from the former Province of Posen settled in the province. On the other hand, people left the rural communities en masse and turned to Pomeranian and other urban centers (Landflucht). In 1925, 50.7% of the Pomeranians worked in agricultural professions, this percentage dropped to 38.2% in 1933.

With the economic recession, unemployment rates reached 12% in 1933, compared to an overall 19% in the empire.
