= Memorandum of Tübingen =

The Memorandum of Tübingen (German:Tübinger Memorandum) was a memorandum dealing with West German foreign policy, written by eight prominent German Protestant academics and scientists. It was sent to the German Bundestag in 1961. The memorandum was a manifesto in protest of the planned nuclear armament of West Germany and in favour of the recognition of the Oder-Neiße line as the official border between Germany and Poland by the West German government. Both issues were highly controversial and hotly debated issues in West German politics at the time.

It was signed on 6 November 1961 and sent to several members of parliament of the German Bundestag. On 24 February 1962 it was made available to the general public.

The signatories were:

- Hellmut Becker, lawyer, Kressbronn am Bodensee
- Joachim Beckmann, theologian, Praeses of the Evangelical Church in the Rhineland, Düsseldorf
- Klaus von Bismarck, journalist, intendant of the Westdeutscher Rundfunk, Cologne
- Werner Heisenberg, physicist, 1932 Physics Nobel Prize laureate, Munich
- Günter Howe, mathematician, physicist and theologian, Heidelberg
- Georg Picht, philosopher, theologian and pedagogue, Hinterzarten
- Ludwig Raiser, lawyer, Tübingen
- Carl Friedrich von Weizsäcker, physicist, philosopher and political scientist (peace and conflict studies)

== Criticism ==
The Memorandum and the eight signatories were criticised by the German far-right newspaper, the Deutsche National-Zeitung und Soldaten-Zeitung for advocating the recognition of the Oder-Neiße line.
