= Joachim Beckmann =

German evangelical theologian

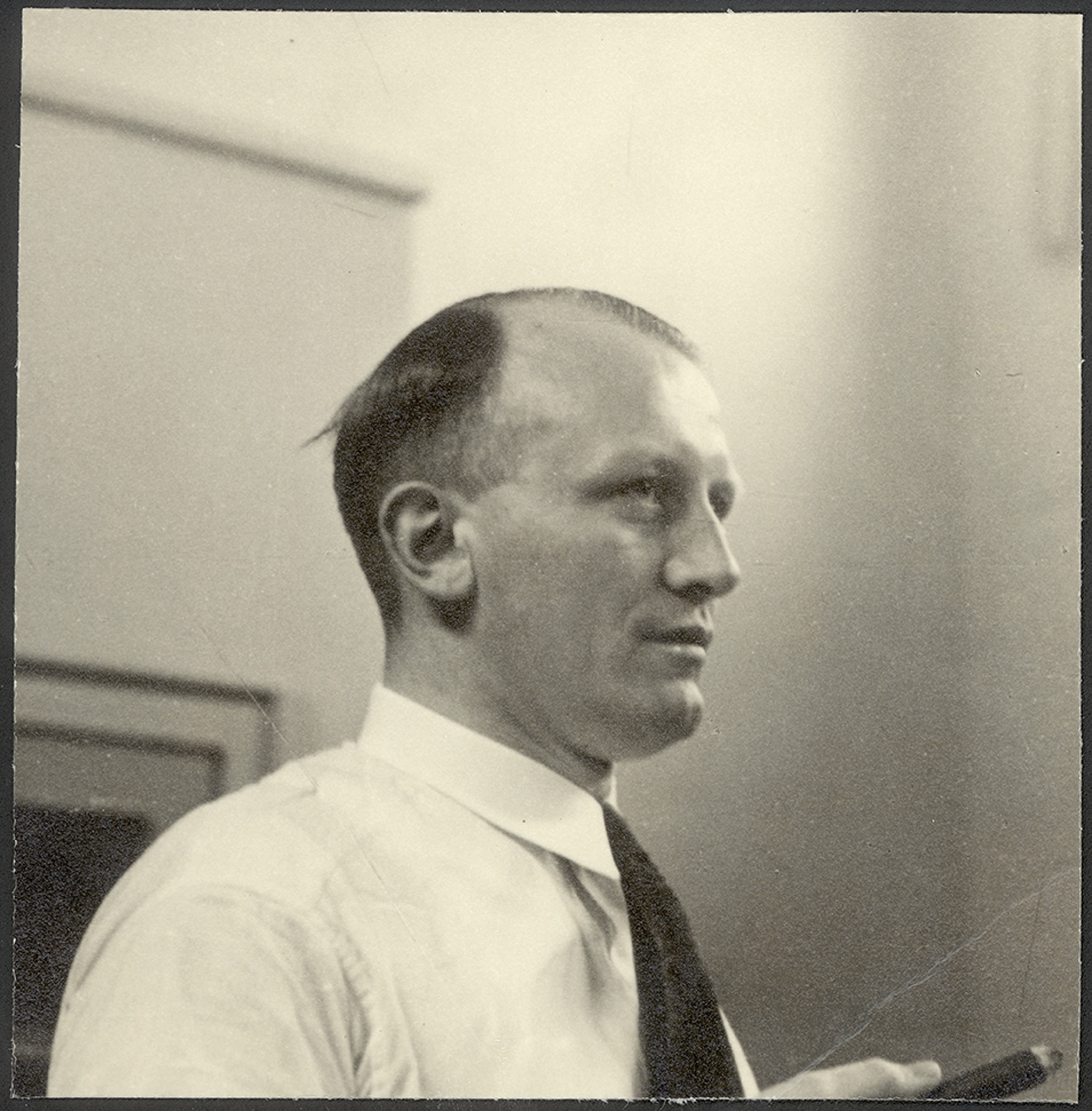
- Beckmann in 1934
- Born: 18 July 1901; Eickel, Rhine Province, Prussia, Germany
- Died: 18 January 1987; Haan, North Rhine-Westphalia, West Germany
- Education: Marburg; Tübingen; Münster; Göttingen
- Occupations: Theologian; Pastor "Präses" (synod president) of the Evangelical Church in the Rhineland
- Spouse: Hilde Hagemann
- Children: 4
- Parent(s): Julius August Wilhelm Beckmann; Frieda Schmidt

Joachim Beckmann (18 July 1901 – 18 January 1987) was a German evangelical theologian. He served between 1958 and 1971 as "Präses" (synod president) of the Evangelical Church in the Rhineland.

== Life ==
Joachim Wilhelm Beckmann was born into a conservative traditionalist family in Eickel, a small town in the heart of the rapidly industrialising Ruhr conurbation, within which Eickel is positioned between Essen and Dortmund. His father, Julius August Wilhelm Beckmann, was a Protestant pastor. Sources are largely silent about his childhood, but in 1920, when he passed his Abitur (school final exams) he was a pupil at the Gymnasium (secondary school) at nearby Wattenscheid. Early in 1920 he enrolled at the Philipps University of Marburg to study Protestant Theology and Philosophy. His teachers at Marburg included Rudolf Otto, Nicolai Hartmann and Adolf Jülicher. After only a few months, however, he switched to the Eberhard Karl University of Tübingen. Here he was taught by Karl Heim and Adolf Schlatter. A year later, in Autumn/Fall 1921, he switched again, this time to University of Münster, emerging in 1923 or 1924 with a doctorate on a theological topic. (Note: The title of Beckmann's PhD dissertation was "Über den Begriff der religiösen Erfahrung bei Stange".) At Münster his principal focus was on Kantianism and Neo-Kantianism. His theological approach, as disclosed by his doctoral dissertation, was very much formed by the ideas of Karl Barth. At each of the three universities he attended prior to receiving his doctorate, he joined the "Wingolf" Christian student fraternity, retaining his membership long after he had left university, till 1938. In 1924 he passed his level 1 Theology exam with the Protestant consistory for the Westphalia province of the "Old Prussian Union of Evangelical Churches" at the province's Münster central office. Passing the exam meant that he was now authorised to conduct church services.

During the summer of 1924 Beckmann transferred to Göttingen, where he became "Inspector of the Protestant College" ("Inspektor des reformierten Studienhauses") and, during 1924/25, completed his "Vikariat" (formal ministerial traineeship). Joachim Beckmann had been a huge admirer of the written work of Karl Barth since the start of the decade. Barth had accepted an honorary professorship from the university in 1921. By moving to Göttingen, Beckmann was able to become a pupil of the man who became, for him, something of a theological mentor. In 1925 he received a doctorate of theology, this time on Calvin's approach to the Sacrament and how it related to the Augustinian tradition. (Note: "Vom Sakrament bei Calvin – Die Sakramentslehre Calvins in ihren Beziehungen zu Augustin") Despite being held in wide regard among colleagues, and notwithstanding his teaching work at the university, Karl Barth never received an "ordinary" full professorship at Göttingen, possibly on account of his Swiss provenance, and was accordingly not authorised to supervise doctorates there. Beckmann's doctoral dissertation was supervised by Emanuel Hirsch. In August 1925 he started working in Berlin as an assistant with Reinhold Seeberg at the National Committee for the Domestic Mission of the German Evangelical Churches ("Central-Ausschuss für die Innere Mission der Deutschen Evangelischen Kirche").

During the first part of 1926 Beckmann passed his level 2 Theology exam. In May 1926 he relocated to Wiesbaden, where he remained for two years: there he worked as a regional pastor for Domestic Mission and Welfare Care with the Evangelical Regional Church in Nassau. On 1 August 1926 it was through the hands of his own father that he was ordained into the ministry at the "Johanneskirche" (St John's Evangelical Church) in Wanne-Eickel. (Note: Wanne and Eickel were merged into a single municipality in 1926, an arrangement that lasted till further boundary reforms were implemented in 1975.) In January 1927 Joachim Beckmann married Hilde Hagemann: the marriage was followed in due course by the births of the couple's four children. Between 1928 and 1933 Beckmann served as minister to the Westphalia Frauenhilfe (literally, "women's help") association in Soest. In this position his role was principally that of a teacher.

In 1933 Beckmann took over a pastoral post with the Lutheran church community in Düsseldorf, retaining this ministry, by some criteria, without a break till 1948. Soon after that he took on a succession of leading roles within the anti-government Confessing Church of which, in the Rhineland, he was a co-founder during 1933. (Note: 1933 was the year in which the Hitler government took power and rapidly transformed Germany into a post-democratic one-party dictatorship.) In 1934 Beckmann attended the important inaugural synod of the Confessing Church at Wuppertal-Barmen and the second synod at Berlin-Dahlem, held respectively in May and October 1934. During 1934 he became a member of the National Brothers' Council ("Reichsbruderrat"), the leadership committee of the Confessing Church. Beckmann's central involvement in the establishment of the Confessing Church seems to have been triggered on 8 February 1934 when, along with Friedrich Graeber and Heinrich Held, he was suspended, from his church duties in Düsseldorf on account of unspecified "activities against the [government-backed] "German Christians" movement". His suspension was later reversed, however. On 15 May 1935 Beckmann was served with a banning order which forbad him from staying in the Düsseldorf district: this time the ban lasted for only two months, however.

In 1937, 1938 or 1939 (sources differ) Beckmann was served with a government speaking ban which lasted till 1945. This had the effect that he was prohibited from public speaking (except inside the Lutheran church building in Düsseldorf). There was also a special legal action launched against him in connection with Confessing Church exams in which he had participated. The exams in question had been set up as part of a parallel structure intended to create an alternative to a new (government mandated) exam structure involving a "German Christian commission". They had been banned under the terms of a decree issued by Reichsführer Heinrich Himmler on 29 August 1937, which prohibited any theological training by the Confessing Church.

The end of the war in 1945 also put an end to the twelve Hitler years. Beckmann emerged as a member of the leadership team of the Evangelical Church in the Rhineland, serving as president of the Rhineland consistory between 1945 and 1949. In 1947 he was elected deputy president of the National Brothers' Council ("Reichsbruderrat" or "synod") of the Evangelical Church, serving a two-year term till 1949, under the leadership of Heinrich Held. Sources suggest that behind the scenes Beckmann was a particularly influential, with respect to the church's decisions and pronouncements. Following the organisational changes of 1949 Beckmann continued to serve as deputy to Praeses Heinrich Held till the latter's sudden death in 1957.

In 1945 or 1948 Beckmann took over responsibility for publishing the Evangelical Church Year Book, for which he continued to serve as editor-compiler till 1975. Beckmann had taught at the Church College at Wuppertal-Barmen since it had re-opened in 1945; and in 1951 he accepted a professorship in Systematic theology at the college. To that was added, in 1954, an honorary doctorate from the Theology Faculty at Bonn.

On 1 January 1958 Beckmann's election as "Präses" (synod president) of the Evangelical Church in the Rhineland took effect. The vacancy had been caused by the death of Heinrich Held a little more than three months earlier. Beckmann remained in the post till his retirement on 31 July 1971. Between 1967 and 1972 he was also engaged in church government at a national level, as a member of the governing synod ("Rat") of the Evangelical Church in Germany. By the time he joined the synod, he had already been working directly under its mandate for three years, co-opted in 1964 to deal with the important issues involving Conscientious objectors on an on-going basis. In 1961 Beckmann was a co-signatory of the "Tübingen Memorandum", an open "manifesto", signed by eight high-profile Protestant scholars and scientists, on the subject of West German nuclear re-armament, also calling for recognition by the West German government of the Oder–Neisse line as a permanent border between (East) Germany and Poland. The political positions promoted by the memorandum later became mainstream government policy, but in 1961 they were still contentious. The memorandum gained extensive press coverage, backed by the fact that individual copies were sent to leading politicians including Richard von Weizsäcker, whose brother was one of the eight signatories. Another of the eight was a member of the widely cherished Bismarck dynasty. Despite his involvement in the "Tübingen Memorandum", Präses Beckmann was generally to be found resisting pressure from younger church leaders to involve the church more intensively and more openly in the secular issues of the time, such as the heated passions, especially among politicised students, surrounding Cold War and Vietnam War.

Beckmann was also a regular participant in television's regular religious programme, Das Wort zum Sonntag (loosely, "The Word for Sunday").

After his retirement, a couple of weeks after his seventieth birthday, Beckmann returned to teaching at the Barmen Church College, where he remained on the payroll between the start of the 1971/72 winter term, on 1 October 1971, and his eightieth birthday, 18 July 1981.

== Recognition ==
- 1954: Honorary doctorate from the Evangelical Theology faculty at the University of Bonn
- 1960: Honorary professorship from the University of Bonn
- 1971: Großkreuz ("Order of Merit")
- 1978: Verdienstkreuz am Bande ("Order of Merit")
