= Konarzewo, Goleniów County =

Konarzewo
- Village
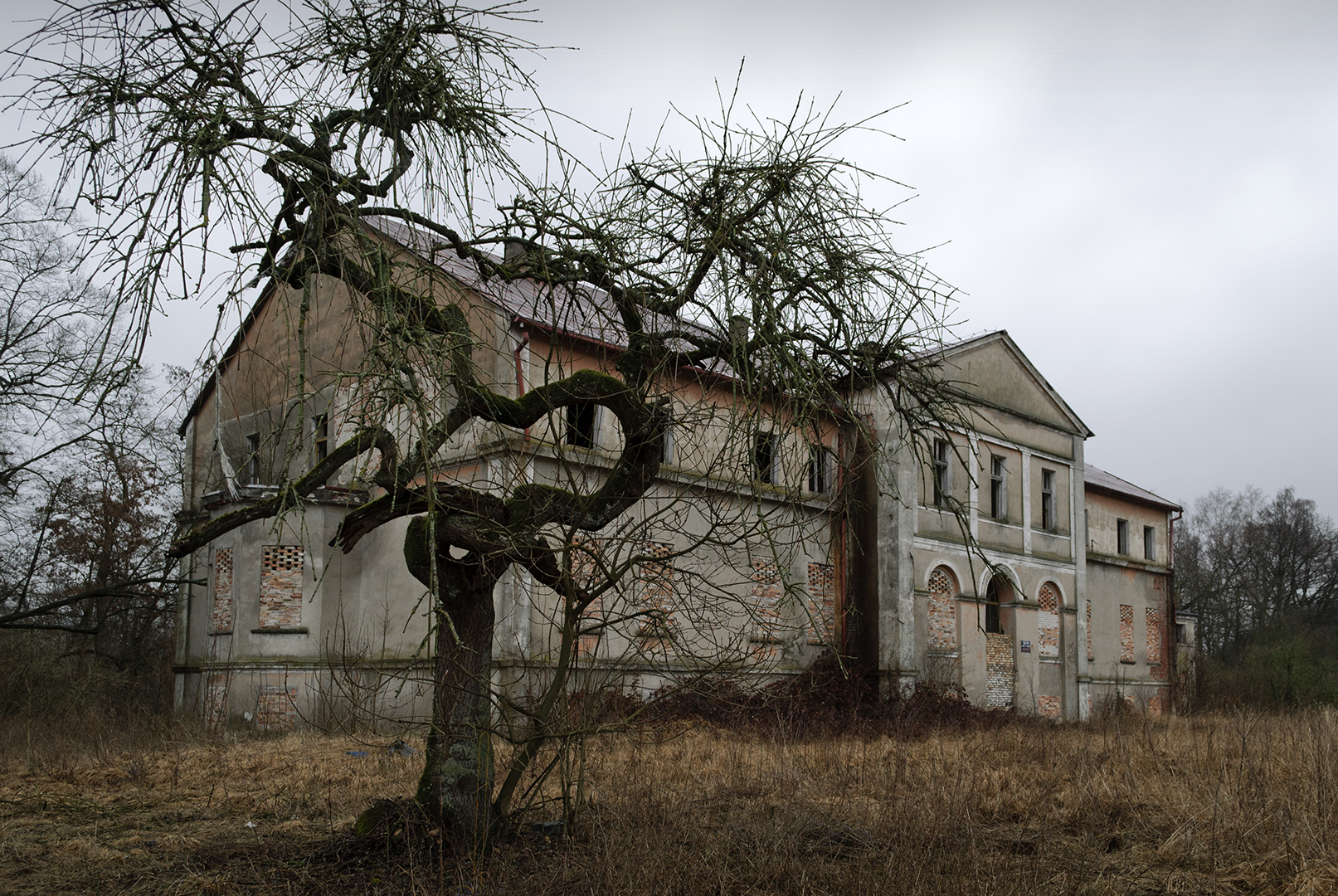
- Old manor house in Konarzewo

- Location within Poland
- Coordinates: 53°42′1″N 15°13′34″E
- Country: Poland
- Voivodeship: West Pomeranian
- County: Goleniów
- Gmina: Nowogard
- Time zone: UTC+1 (CET)
  - Summer (DST): UTC+2 (CEST)
- Vehicle registration: ZGL

Konarzewo [kɔnaˈʐɛvɔ] (German: Kniephof) is a village in the administrative district of Gmina Nowogard, in Goleniów County, West Pomeranian Voivodeship, in north-western Poland. It lies approximately 9 kilometres (5.6 miles) northeast of Nowogard, 32 kilometres (20 miles) northeast of Goleniów and 53 kilometres (33 miles) northeast of the regional capital, Szczecin.

== History ==
The estate of Kniephof originally was a possession of the German noble clan von Dewitz, of Mecklenburg and Pomerania, which eventually sold it to Prussian Major August Friedrich von Bismarck-Schönhausen. By 1780, the estate included a manor house and four family dwellings.

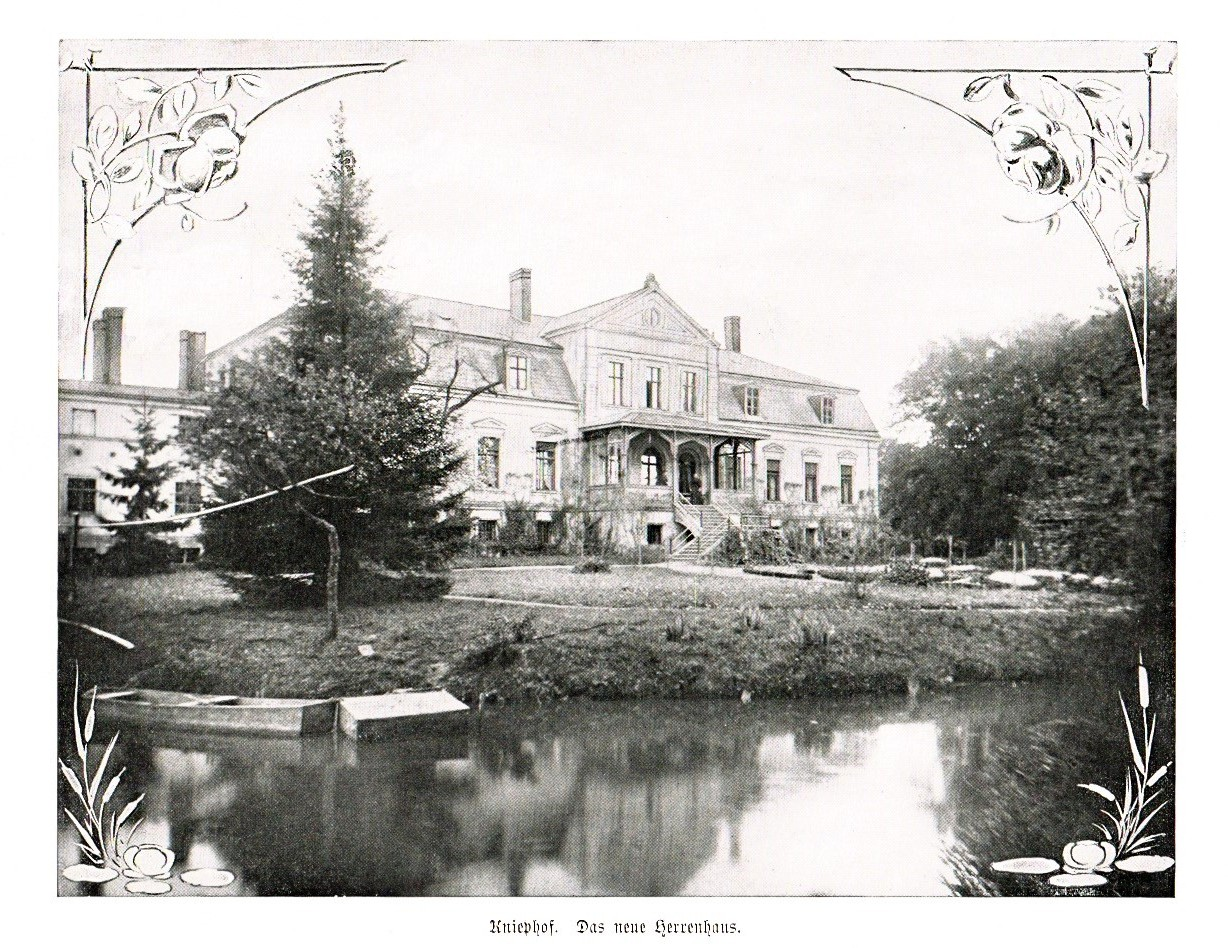
The manor house in 1915

The 19th century German chancellor, Otto von Bismarck (born 1815), lived at Kniephof as a child, and his sister Malwine was born there in 1827. From 1839 to 1845, Otto von Bismarck and his brother Bernhard jointly managed the Kniephof and two other estates. In 1868, Otto von Bismarck, since 1862 Prussian Minister-President, sold the Kniephof to his nephew Philipp von Bismarck.

Until post-World War II border changes transferred the area to Poland, Kniephof belonged to the municipality of Jarchlin (now Jarchlino, Poland) in the district of Naugard (now Nowogard) in the then-German province of Pomerania.

The last family owner of the estate, up to 1945, was Klaus von Bismarck.

In spring 1945, as the Second World War neared its conclusion, the area was occupied by the Soviet Army. Polish settlers began to arrive, the settlement's name was changed to Konarzewo, and those German residents who had not fled or been killed in the fighting were eventually expropriated and expelled westward in accordance with the Potsdam Agreement.

== Prominent residents ==
- Otto von Bismarck (1815–1898) lived here between 1839 and 1846.
