= Ludwig Raiser =

German legal scholar (1904–1980)

Ludwig Raiser (27 October 1904 – 13 June 1980) was a German legal scholar.

In 1961, Raiser was one of the signatories of the Memorandum of Tübingen on West German foreign policy.

Raiser was President of the Synod of the Evangelical Church in Germany from 1970 to 1973.

Raiser was the father of Konrad Raiser, General Secretary of the World Council of Churches.
