= Gustavia, Rügen =

Coordinates: 54°17′19″N 13°41′45″E

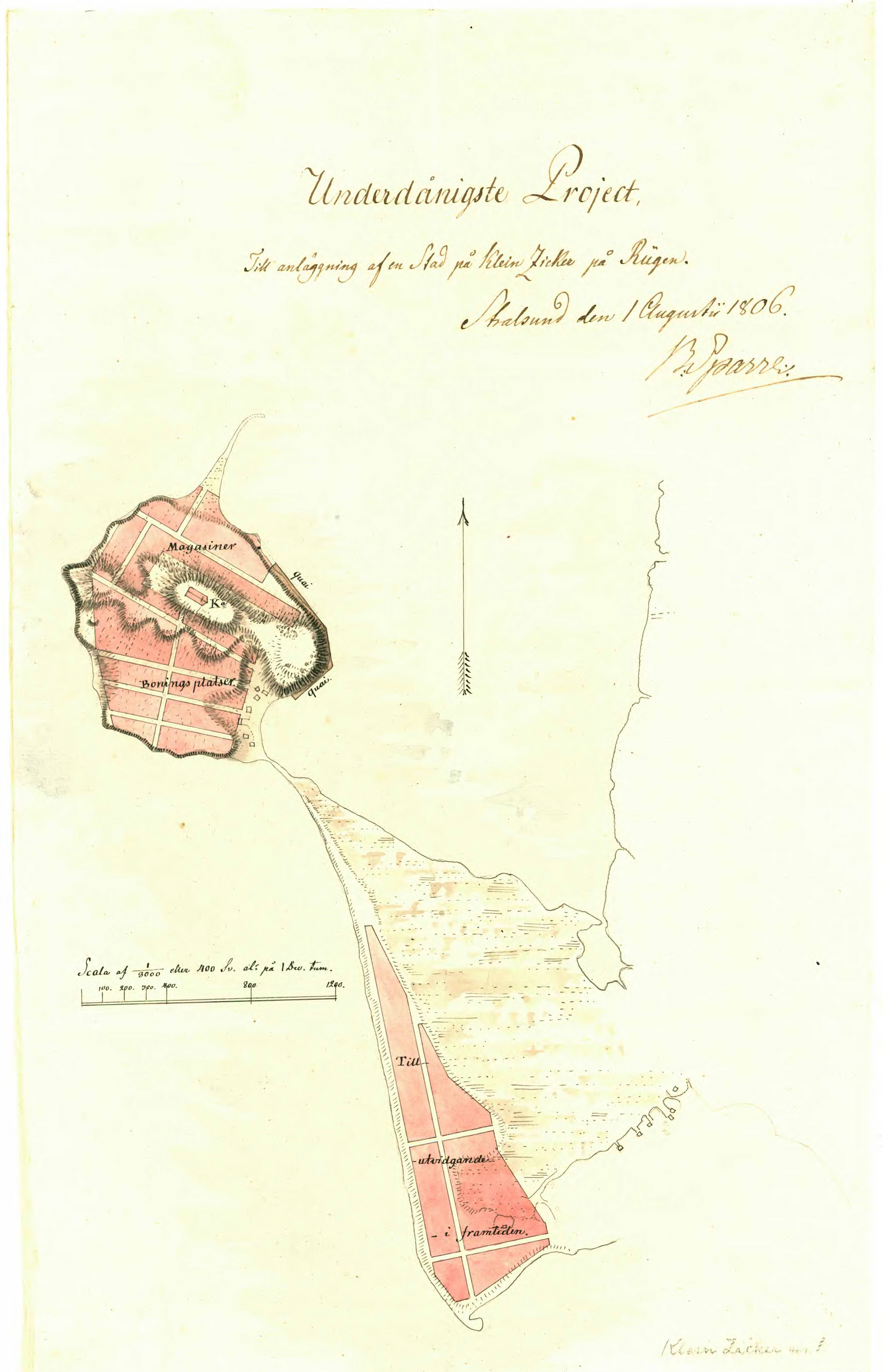
Gustavia, plan in the Stockholm krigsarkivet

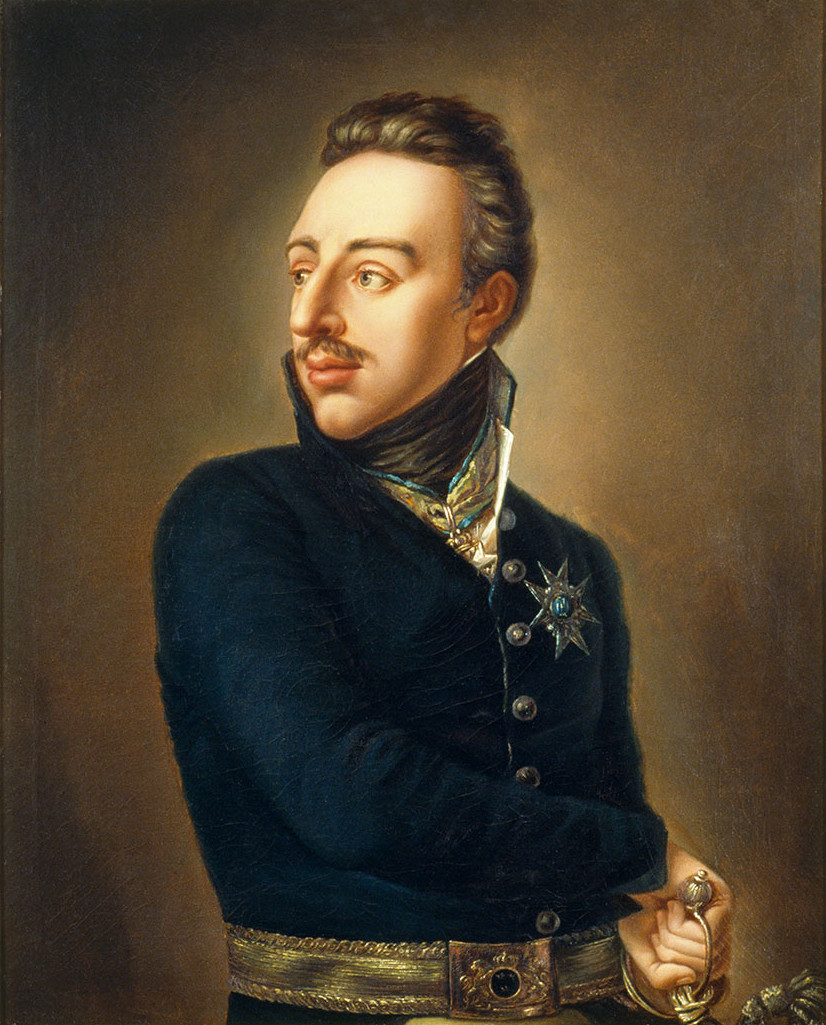
Gustav IV Adolf of Sweden

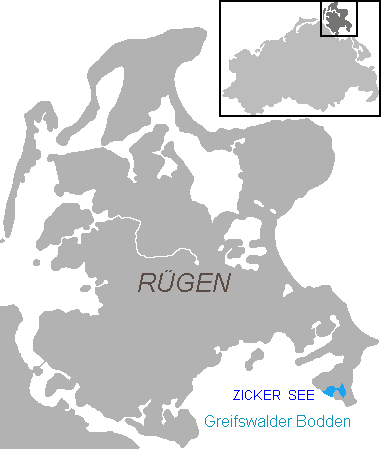
Position of Zicker See ("Zicker Bay"), the Gustavian port, on Rügen (main map) and in Mecklenburg-Vorpommern (small map)

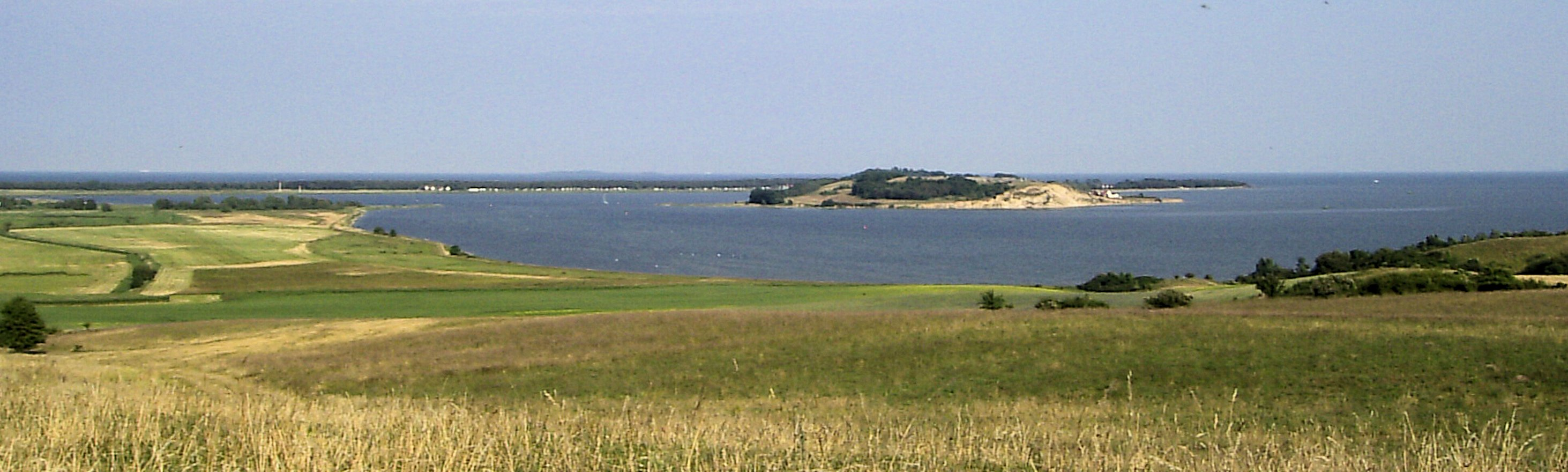
Site of Gustavia today

Gustavia was a 19th-century unfinished Swedish town on the island of Rügen, the construction of which began and had to be aborted during the Napoleonic Wars.

== Background ==
The Swedish Empire was involved in several wars, with Swedish Pomerania frequently turning into a battlefield. Not having a port on the isle of Rügen proved disadvantageous in situations when access to nearby Stralsund was blocked by enemy forces on the mainland. In situations like that, Swedish landing forces often suffered casualties when they were deployed at Rügen's unsecured beaches. Thus, in 1806 plans for a port city on Rügen's southeastern shore were drafted. Furthermore, Sweden hoped to be able to easily block any naval access to Stralsund, Greifswald and Wolgast with a fortified port city on the Mönchgut peninsula.

This port was to be named after the contemporary Swedish monarch, Gustav IV Adolf, who planned Gustavia not only as a naval base, but also as a trading town ("köping").

From July to August 1806, officers Boye and Gripenberg completed surveying the area around Groß and Klein Zicker, attesting that the nearby bay Zicker See would make a good harbor for three to four hundred vessels once the sand splits barring the inlet were dredged. Boye also drafted first plans for the town.

== Construction ==
On 11 September 1806, Gustav IV Adolf ordered the port to be constructed, entrusting Ljungberg with the oversight. Construction started the same month with blasts and earthworks west of the village Groß Zicker and the erection of landing bridges at the beach. In October, the plans of the future town became more precise with 30 objects being suggested for construction, including a shipyard, a dock, a naval academy, an esplanade with representative residential buildings, a nursery and a school for craftsmanship and agriculture. In December, the site was surveyed again by Johan Daniel Sabelström and Fale Fjellström.

In 1807, the French army seized Stralsund and occupied Rügen in October. All constructions of Gustavia were deconstructed or levelled by the French occupation forces. When Sweden regained control of the site, construction was not resumed, and in 1812 it was again occupied by French forces. After their final withdrawal in 1813, Sweden constructed two landing bridges nearby, one in Zickersches Hövt and one in Göhren. When the Congress of Vienna ended the Napoleonic Wars in 1815, Swedish Pomerania was assigned to Prussia, and while the Prussian navy did occasionally use the former Gustavian port and in 1849/50 erected some dolphins therein, Prussia was not interested in resuming the Swedish project.

Underwater wooden cases filled with rocks, remains of the landing bridge built in 1813, are all that is left from Gustavia.

== See also ==
- Pomerania during the Early Modern Age
- History of Pomerania (1806-1933)
- Carlsburg, Weser

== Sources ==
=== Bibliography ===
- Asmus, Ivo. "Gustavia - Ein schwedisches Hafen- und Stadtprojekt für Mönchgut" (in German and Swedish). rügen.de. Archived from the original on 24 February 2007.
- Krüger, Joachim. "Gustavia - Ein Hafenprojekt aus dem Jahre 1806 auf der Insel Rügen" (PDF) (in German). Schwedenstrasse.com, a corporate research tool and information site of the Swedish embassy in Berlin, the cities of Greifswald, Stralsund, Wismar, Prenzlau, Wittstock/Dosse and Fremdenverkehrsverband Vorpommern e.V. Archived from the original (PDF) on 16 July 2011.
