= Klaus von Bismarck =

German officer and journalist (1912–1997)

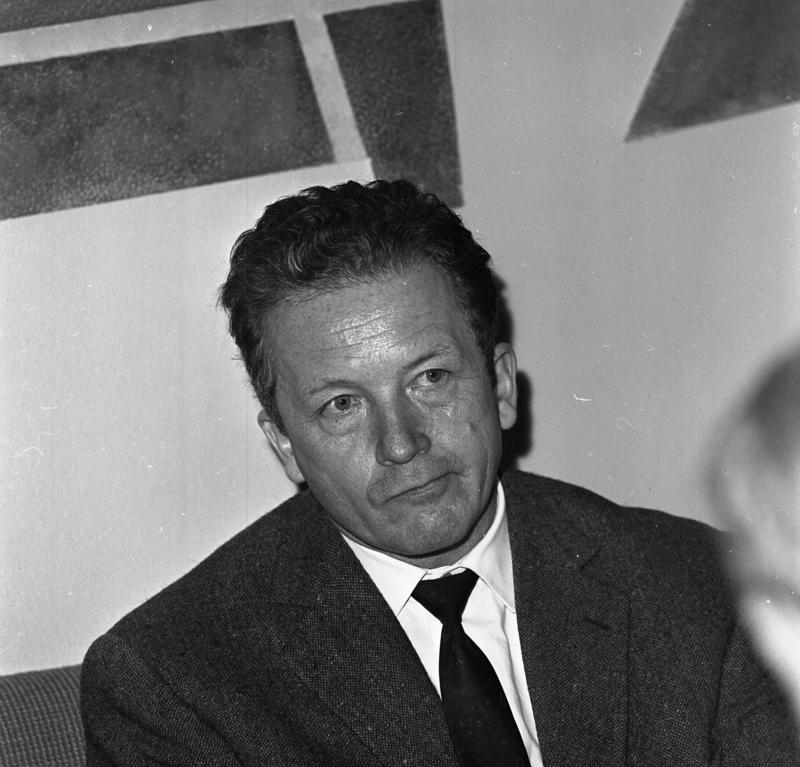
- Klaus von Bismarck in 1961
- Born: 6 March 1912; Jarchlin, Germany
- Died: 22 May 1997 (aged 85); Hamburg, Germany
- Organisation(s): Westdeutscher Rundfunk; German Evangelical Church Assembly
- Awards: Knight's Cross of the Iron Cross with Oak Leaves; Grand Cross of Merit of the Federal Republic of Germany

Klaus von Bismarck (6 March 1912 – 22 May 1997) was the Director General of the Westdeutscher Rundfunk (English: West German Broadcasting) from 1961 to 1976, and the president of the ARD broadcasting association in 1963-1964. He was also the president of the German Evangelical Church Assembly from 1977 to 1979 and a member of its presidium from 1950 to 1995, as well as president of the Goethe-Institut from 1977 to 1989.

During World War II, Bismarck served as an officer in the Wehrmacht. He was a recipient of the Knight's Cross of the Iron Cross with Oak Leaves. According to his memoirs, published in 1992, while serving as an adjutant on the Russian front in 1941 he refused to obey Hitler's Commissar Order to execute all captured Communist political commissars attached to the Soviet Army.

He was a great-great nephew of German Chancellor Otto von Bismarck, and was the son of Gottfried von Bismarck (1881–1928). Klaus von Bismarck was the last owner of the family's estates in formerly German Farther Pomerania, including Kniephof (now Konarzewo, Poland), where Otto von Bismarck spent his childhood.

Bismarck received an honorary Doctor of Theology degree (Dr. h. c. theol.) from the University of Münster. He was one of the eight signatories of the Memorandum of Tübingen which called for the recognition of the Oder-Neiße line as the official border between West Germany and Poland and spoke against a possible nuclear armament of West Germany.

== Awards and decorations ==
- Iron Cross (1939) 2nd Class (9 October 1939) & 1st Class (18 June 1940)
- Knight's Cross of the Iron Cross with Oak Leaves
  - Knight's Cross on 31 December 1941 as Oberleutnant and leader of the II./Infanterie-Regiment 4
  - 669th Oak Leaves on 26 November 1944 as Major and commander of Grenadier-Regiment 4
- Grand Cross of Merit of the Federal Republic of Germany (3 October 1973)
- Grand Federal Cross of Merit with Star (1982)
- Grand Federal Cross of Merit with Star and Sash (2 June 1989)
- Commander of the Order of Merit of the Italian Republic (1989)
