= Evangelical Church in the Rhineland =

United Protestant church body in parts of several German states

The Protestant Church in the Rhineland (German: Evangelische Kirche im Rheinland; EKiR) is a United Protestant church body in parts of the German states of North Rhine-Westphalia, Rhineland-Palatinate, Saarland and Hesse (Wetzlar). This is actually the area covered by the former Prussian Rhine Province until 1920.

Evangelical Church in the Rhineland

The seat of the church is in Düsseldorf. The church leader is not called a "bishop", but a praeses (German: Präses), and there is no cathedral. The Protestant Church in the Rhineland is a full member of the Protestant Church in Germany (EKD), and is a Prussian Union Church. The current praeses is Thorsten Latzel. The Evangelical Church in the Rhineland is one of 20 Lutheran, united, and Reformed churches of the EKD. As of December 2025, the church has 2,054,811 members in 576 parishes. The Protestant Church in the Rhineland is a member of the UEK and the Community of Protestant Churches in Europe and also the Reformed Alliance. The church runs a conference venue called Evangelische Akademie. It is a member of the Conference of Churches on the Rhine.

== Some theological statements ==
The theological teaching goes back on Martin Luther. The ordination of women is allowed. The blessing of same-sex marriages has been allowed by the synod and depends on the local church administration (German: Presbyterium, English: presbytery).

== History ==
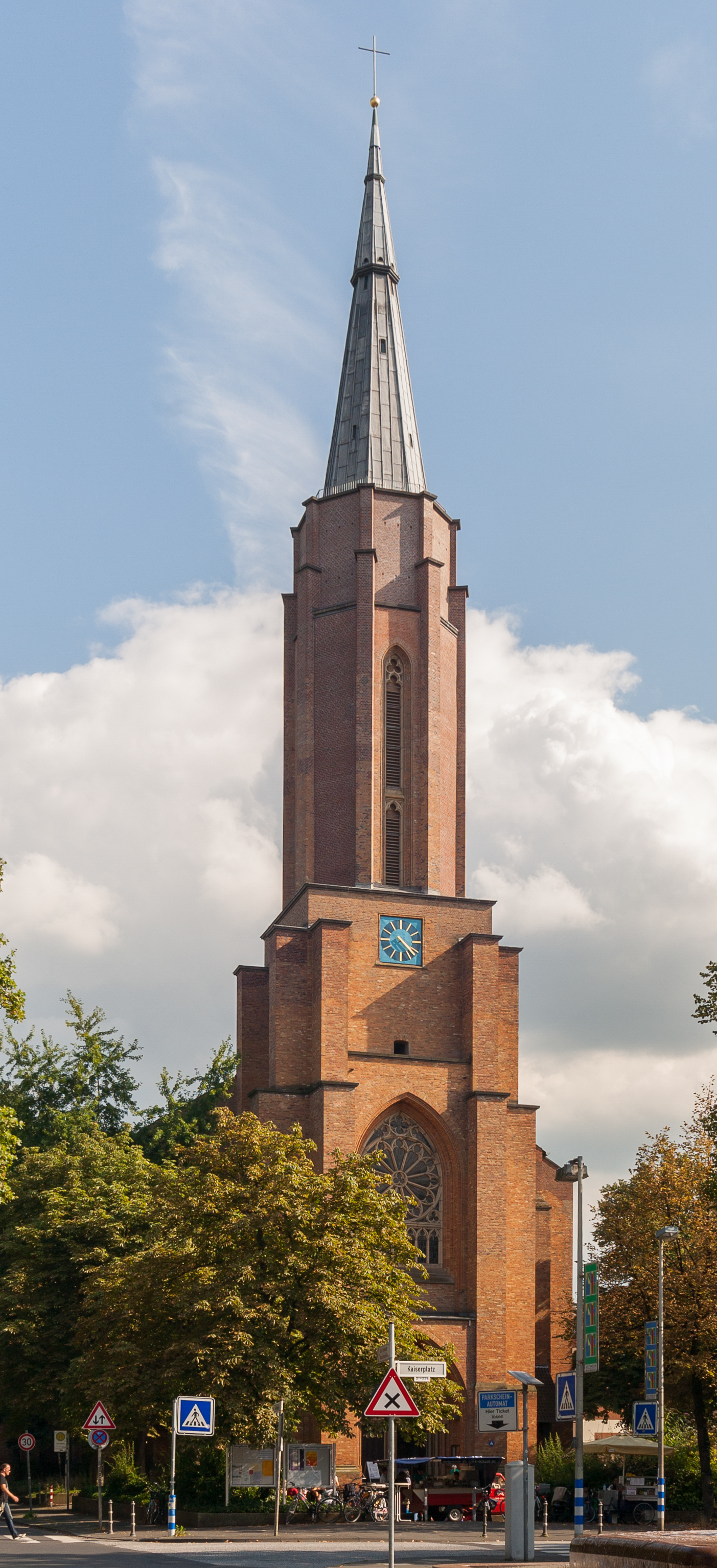
Kreuzkirche in Bonn

The Protestant Church in the Rhineland emerged on 12 November 1948, when the Ecclesiastical Province of the Rhineland within the Evangelical Church of the old-Prussian Union gained independence as its own church body. The Protestants in Hohenzollern merged in 1950 with the Evangelical-Lutheran Church in Württemberg, whilst retaining the previous old-Prussian order of service.

== Legislative assembly and leaders ==
The legislative assembly of the Evangelical Church in the Rhineland is the regional synod (Landessynode). The election of the synod is for four years. Since 1975 the synod meets annually in January in Bad Neuenahr-Ahrweiler (before 1975 in Bad Godesberg). Its elected leader (praeses) is also leader of the church.

=== Praesides ===
The legislative body, then called the provincial synod (Provinzialsynode), was already established when the Rhenish church still formed an ecclesiastical province of the Evangelical Church of the old-Prussian Union. The then praesides were only speakers of the synod but not the leaders of the ecclesiastical province. Instead this function was with the general superintendents. Since the ecclesiastical province assumed its independence each praeses is speaker of the synod and leader of the church.

- 1835–1846: Franz Friedrich Gräber
- 1847–1851: Georg August Ludwig Schmidtborn
- 1853–1860: Johann Heinrich Wiesmann
- 1862–1864: Johann Karl Friedrich Maaß
- 1865–1877: Friedrich Nieden
- 1877–1888: Stephan Friedrich Evertsbusch
- 1890–1893: Karl Wilhelm Ferdinand Kirschstein
- 1893–1898: Valentin Umbeck
- 1899–1905: Friedrich Wilhelm Schürmann
- 1908–1912: Albert Hackenberg
- 1914–1917: Georg Hafner
- 1919–1932: Friedrich Walter Paul Wolff
- 1932–1934: Friedrich Schäfer
- 1934–1935: Paul Humburg
- 1935–1948: Friedrich Horn, praeses of the provincial synod
- 1948–1957: Heinrich Karl Ewald Held, praeses of the regional synod and leader of the church
- 1958–1971: Joachim Wilhelm Beckmann
- 1971–1981: Karl Immer
- 1981–1989: Gerhard Brandt
- 1989–1996: Peter Beier
- 1996–1997: vacancy
  - Hans Ulrich Stephan, superior church counsellor and praeses per pro
- 1997–2003: Manfred Kock
- 2003–2013: Nikolaus Schneider
- 2013–2021: Manfred Rekowski
- 2013–present: Thorsten Latzel

== Books ==
- Evangelisches Gesang-Buch
- Evangelisches Gesangbuch für Rheinland und Westfalen, Dortmund, 1883
- Evangelisches Gesangbuch für Rheinland und Westfalen, Dortmund, 1929
- Evangelisches Kirchengesangbuch, Edition for Churches in Rhineland, Westphalia and Lippe, Bielefeld, 1969
