= Jarchlino =

- Village
- Location within Poland
- Coordinates: 53°40′43″N 15°13′4″E
- Country: Poland
- Voivodeship: West Pomeranian
- County: Goleniów
- Gmina: Nowogard
- Population: 250

Jarchlino [jarˈxlinɔ] (German: Jarchlin) is a village in the administrative district of Gmina Nowogard, within Goleniów County, West Pomeranian Voivodeship, in north-western Poland. It lies approximately 7 km (4 mi) east of Nowogard, 31 km (19 mi) north-east of Goleniów, and 52 km (32 mi) north-east of the regional capital Szczecin.

The village has a population of 250.

== Notable residents ==
- Klaus von Bismarck (1912–1997), Director General of the Westdeutscher Rundfunk, President of the ARD, the German Evangelical Church Assembly and the Goethe Institute
