= Mill Gate (Stargard) =

- Brama Młyńska
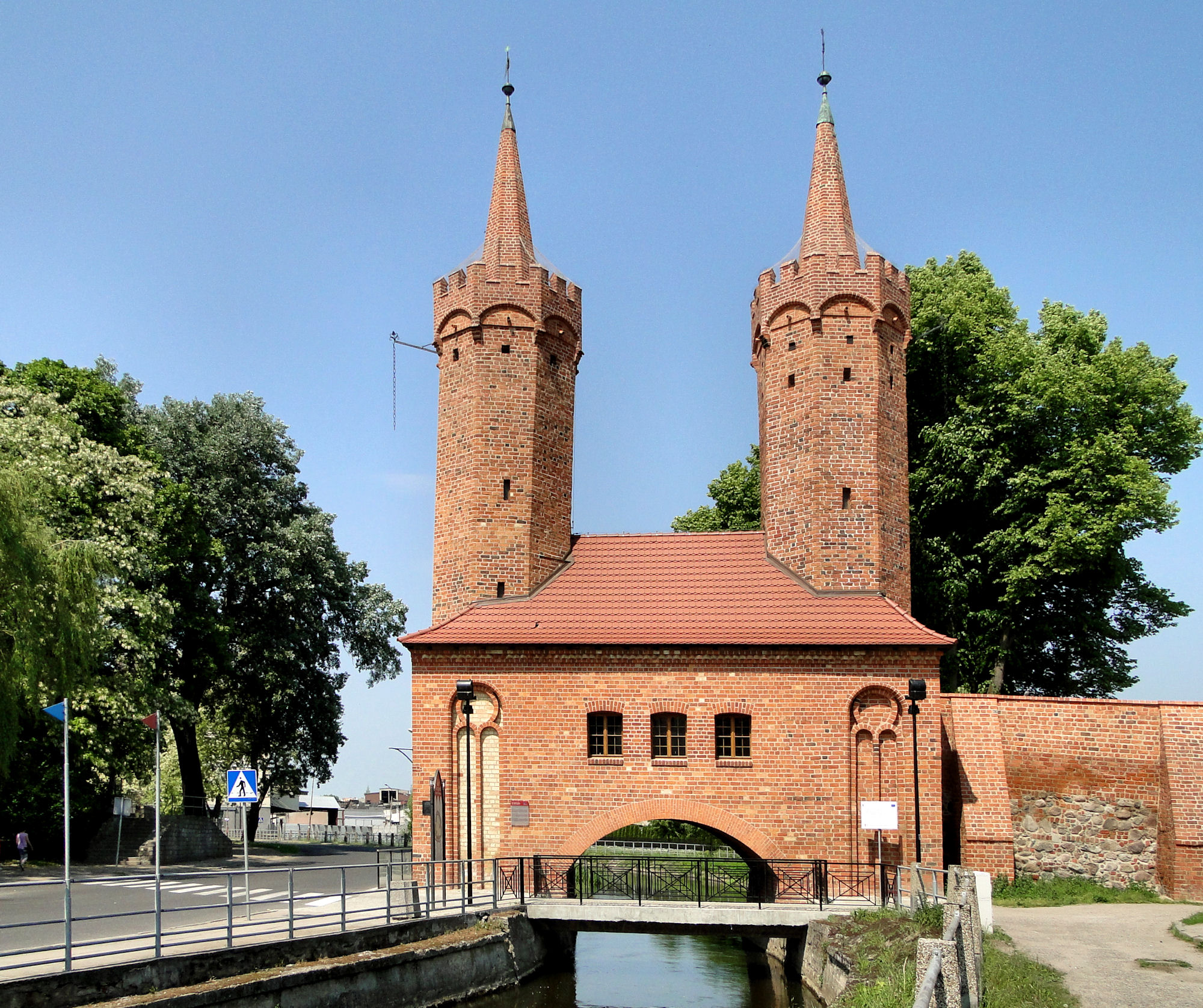

- Location within Poland
- Alternative names: Brama Portowa

General information
- Type: Watergate
- Architectural style: Gothic
- Location: Stargard, Poland
- Coordinates: 53°20′29″N 15°02′43″E
- Completed: mid-14th century

Historic Monument of Poland
- Designated: 2010-09-17
- Part of: Stargard – Blessed Virgin Mary, Queen of the World Church Complex and medieval defensive city walls
- Reference no.: Dz. U. z 2010 r. Nr 184, poz. 1236

Mill Gate (Polish: Brama Młyńska, German: Mühlentor) is an old entrance to the city of Stargard, in Poland, which functioned also as a watergate on Ina river. In medieval times the watch lowered a portcullis into the river for the night, which secured Stargard harbour, situated behind the fortification (an exception in this area), from intruders. Both towers have the so-called Stargard blend motive (the same as in St. Mary's church). Today the Mill Gate is the seat of Stargard's Society of Fine Art Lovers. In 2010, due to its historical and artistic values the Mill Gate, along with the medieval city walls of Stargard, was listed by the President of Poland as a Historic Monument of Poland.

In 1454, during the Wheat War, the people of Stettin, to prevent transport on the Ina river, stretched chains between its banks in an attempt to stop barges from Stargard. As a result of these actions, the people of Stargard appealed to Wartislaw IX to settle the dispute. He ruled in favor of the merchants from Stargard. As a sign of victory and contempt for the people of Stettin, they tore down the chains obstructing the river channel and hung them on the 'Mill Gate', where they remain to this day.

== See also ==
- Waterpoort, another surviving medieval watergate.
