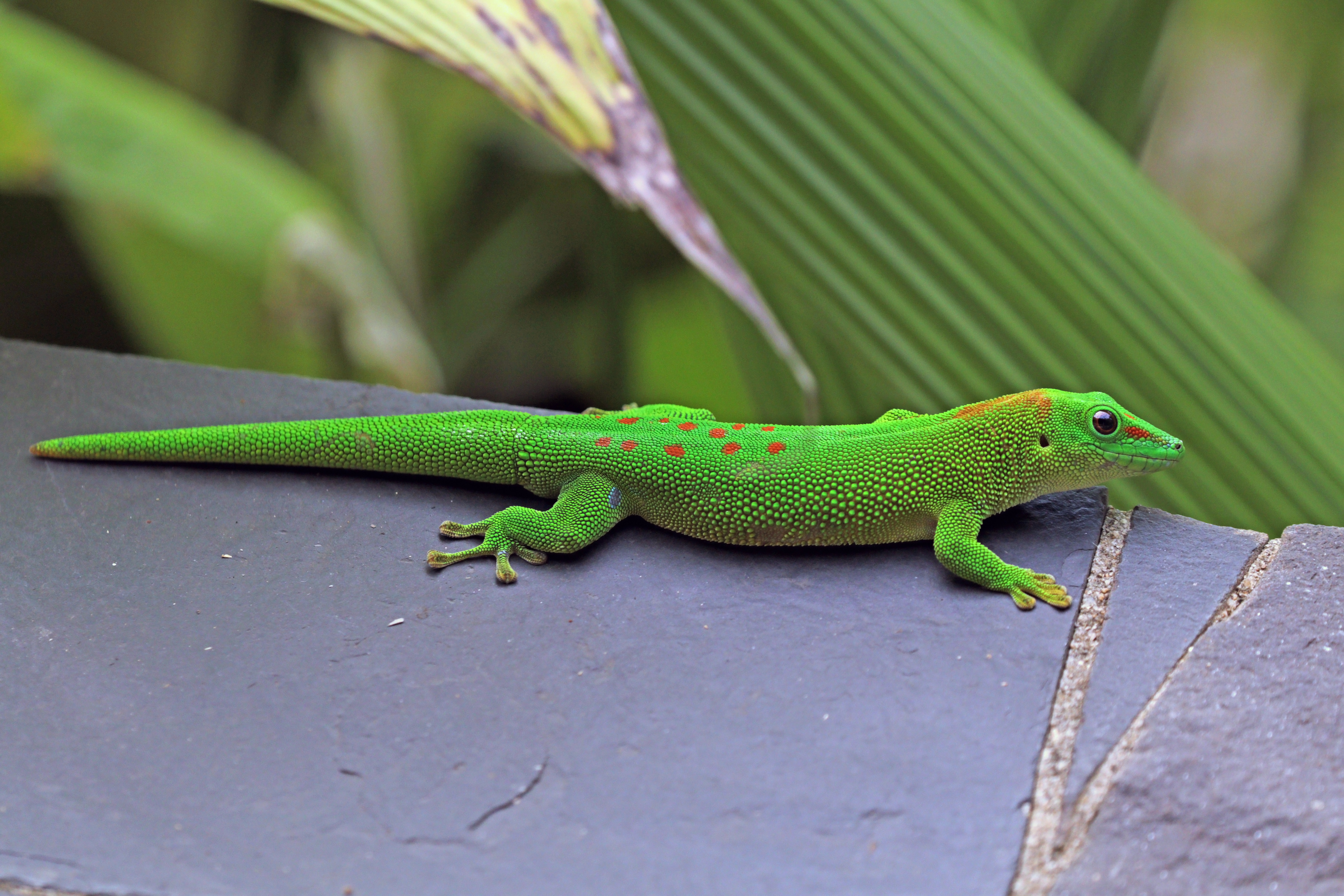

Conservation status
- Least Concern (IUCN 3.1)

Scientific classification
- Kingdom: Animalia
- Phylum: Chordata
- Class: Reptilia
- Order: Squamata
- Suborder: Gekkota
- Family: Gekkonidae
- Genus: Phelsuma
- Species: P. grandis

Binomial name
- Phelsuma grandis Gray, 1870
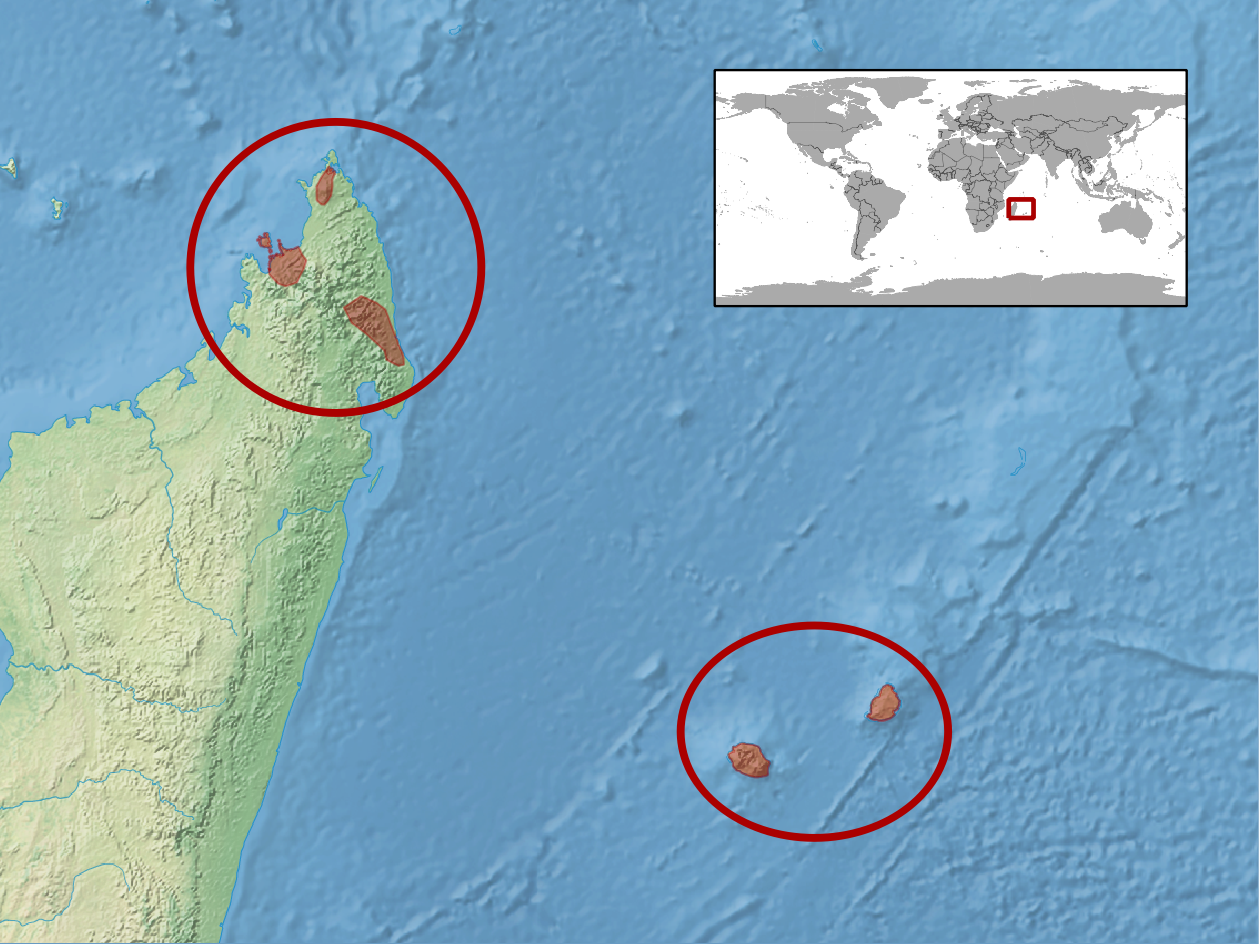

Synonyms
- Phelsuma madagascariensis grandis Gray, 1870

= Phelsuma grandis =

Species of day gecko

Phelsuma grandis is a diurnal arboreal species of day gecko. These geckos are part of the Phelsuma group, which consists of in excess of 70 species and subspecies. They are commonly referred to as the Madagascar giant day gecko, due to their large size. They are native to areas of tropical and subtropical forest in northern Madagascar, but have been introduced to several other subtropical locations outside their range. P. grandis feeds on various invertebrates, very small vertebrates, and nectars. It is bred and sold as an exotic pet.

== Taxonomy ==
Its generic name is a Latinized version of the last name of Dutch physician Murk van Phelsum. Its specific name grandis is Latin for "great".

The species Phelsuma grandis described by Gray 1870 was elevated from subspecies status (P. madagascariensis grandis) by Raxworthy et al. in 2007, after environmental niche modeling revealed significant and reliable differences between it and other members of the P. madagascariensis-clade. This elevation has since received further molecular support. P. grandis possesses also the junior synonyms Phelsuma madagascariensis venusta Mertens, 1964 and Phelsuma madagascariensis notissima Mertens, 1970 (fide Meier, 1982). The common name, appended to the current accepted name, has been given as Madagascar giant day gecko or variants such as Giant Day Gecko.

== Description ==
This lizard reaches a total length of 9–11″ (23–28cm), with females generally being smaller than males. The body colour is bright green or, rarely, bluish green. A red stripe extends from the nostril to the eye. On the back there are typically red coloured dots or bars. These red markings are quite variable, and in some cases, completely absent, though the line extending from the nostril to the eye is always present. Some specimens may have small blue spots. Adult specimens may have large sacs on their necks. These are stored calcium sacks. Young individuals of the species often exhibit much more red than their parents, but as time passes, many of the markings fade, to leave those that will stay for the remainder of the gecko's life. The underside of these animals is a creamy white ranging to an eggy yellow. When stressed, the colouration darkens, rendering the whole animal a dark green, and the red markings on the face and back more orange in hue.

== Distribution and habitat ==
This species is widely distributed in northern and northwest Madagascar. There are a few recorded populations of this species also in Florida and Hawaii. It was introduced to Reunion Island in the mid-1990s and can be found in Mauritius, mainly in the northern part of the island at first, then in Floreal and in the upper Plaine Wilhems, and has since spread to such an extent that the species is considered a threat to the native biodiversity. Day Geckos specifically encroach on the habitats of Phelsuma cepediana, blue-tailed day gecko; Phelsuma guimbeaui, lowland forest day gecko; Phelsuma ornata, ornate day gecko; Phelsuma rosagularis, upland forest day gecko in Mauritius.

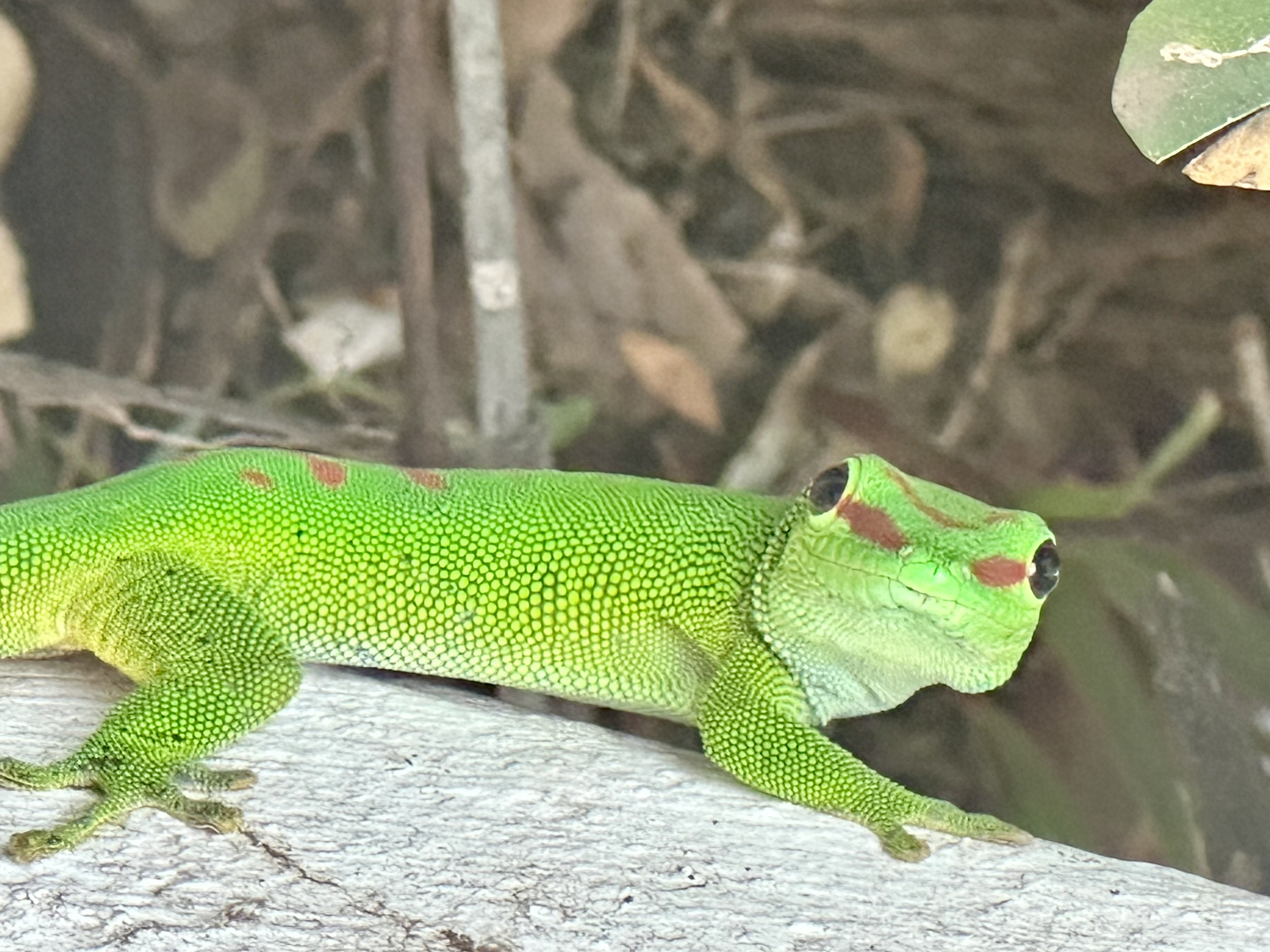
In Mauritius

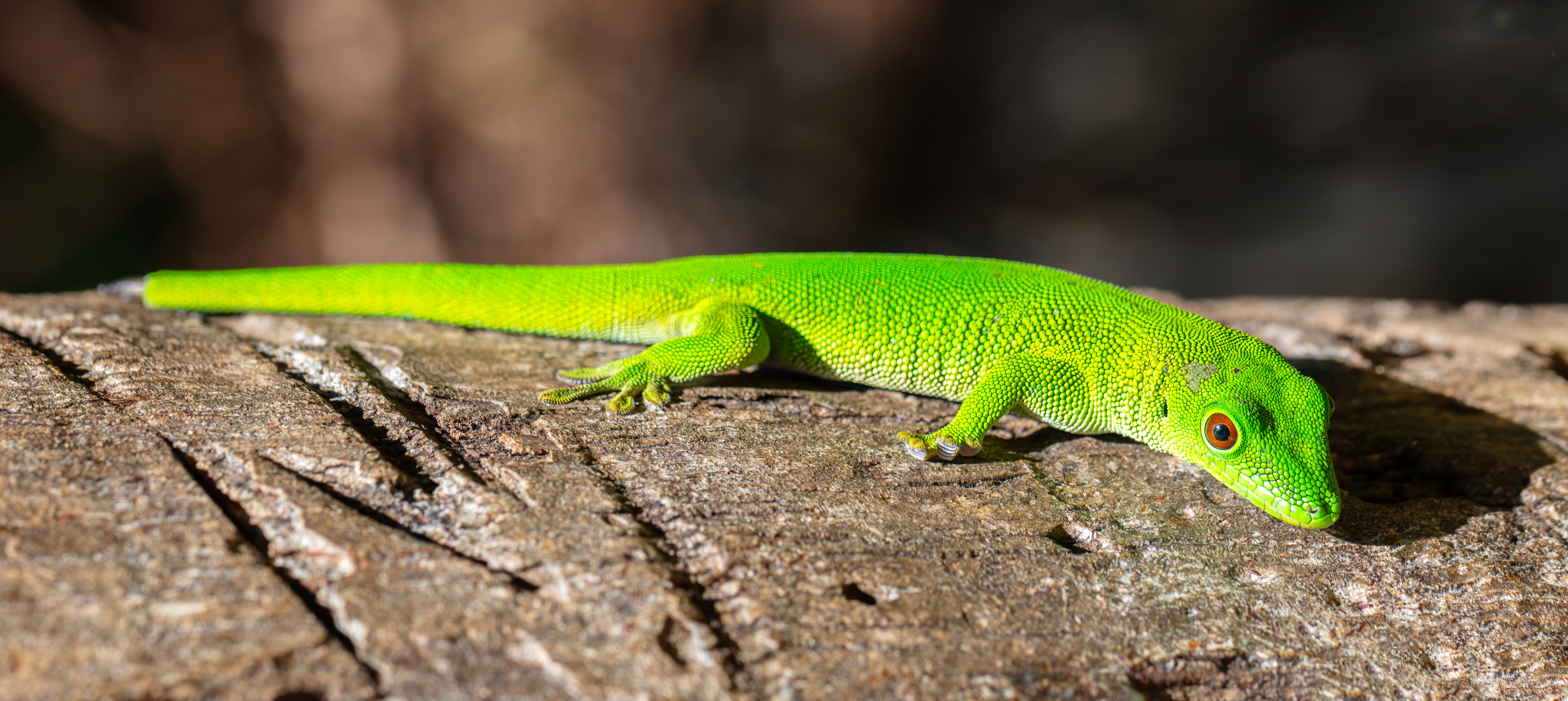
In Madagascar: some examples have no red markings

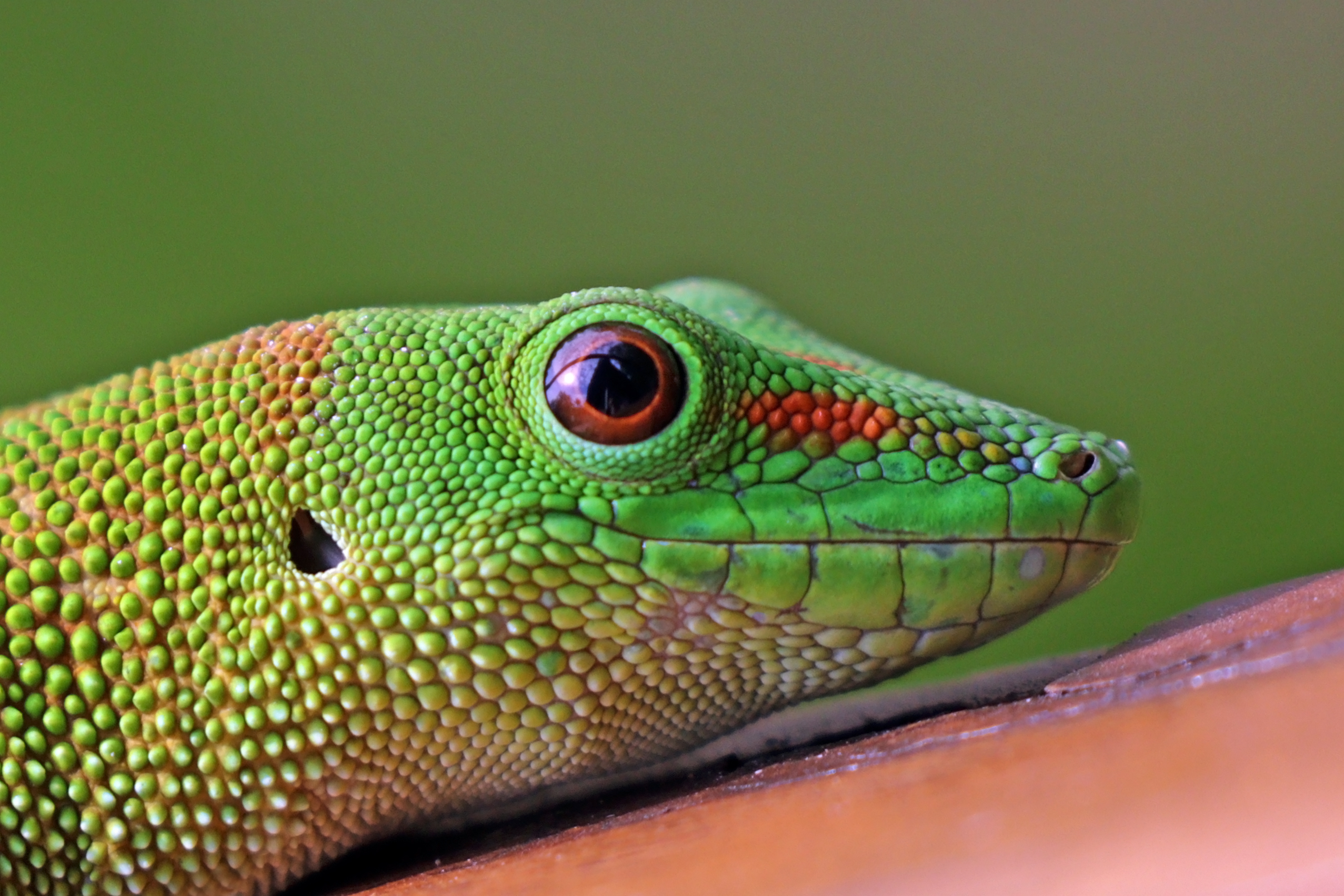
in Madagascar

== Behaviour ==
Like most Phelsuma species, the males can be quite quarrelsome and territorial and will not accept other males in their neighborhood. They only allow females to enter their territory. In captivity, where the females cannot escape, the males can also sometimes seriously wound a female. In this case the male and female must be separated. Breeding behavior includes, the shaking of the tail or body, vocalizing, and if the female does not accept the male she may turn a darker green.

The day geckos may move slowly, but when they are startled they can move very fast. They are known for being very good at escaping their enclosures. Giant day geckos have no eyelids, so to keep their eyes clean, they lick them often.

== Diet ==
These day geckos feed on various insects and other invertebrates, and occasionally have been recorded consuming small vertebrates. They also like to lick soft, sweet fruit, pollen and nectar. Studies show that P. grandis prefer nectars with a red or yellow coloring, and that is trait is innate to all geckos. Geckos in the wild and in captivity have been observed consuming their own young.

== Reproduction ==
The breeding season is between December and June. During this period, females can lay multiple pairs of eggs. The young will hatch after approximately 48–80 days depending on temperature.
