= Sneek =

Sneek Snits (West Frisian)
- City and former municipality
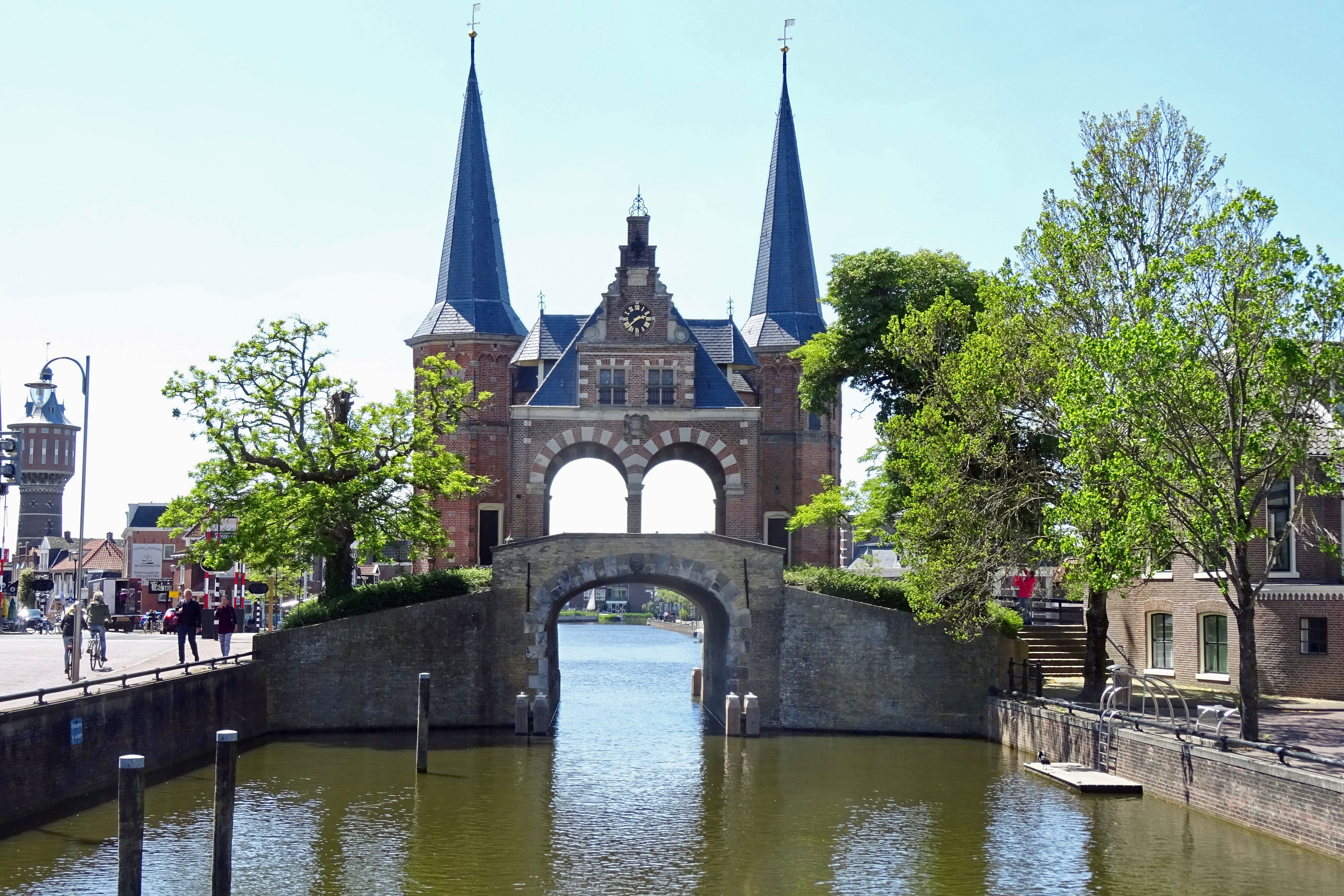
- Waterpoort

- Flag Coat of arms

- Location in the Netherlands Sneek (Netherlands)
- Coordinates: 53°01′57″N 05°39′36″E
- Country: Netherlands
- Province: Friesland
- Municipality: Súdwest-Fryslân

Area
  - Total: 34.04 km^{2} (13.14 sq mi)
- Elevation: 0.8 m (2.6 ft)

Population (2021)
  - Total: 34,485
  - Density: 1,013/km^{2} (2,624/sq mi)
- Time zone: UTC+1 (CET)
  - Summer (DST): UTC+2 (CEST)
- Postal code: 8600-08
- Dialing code: 0515

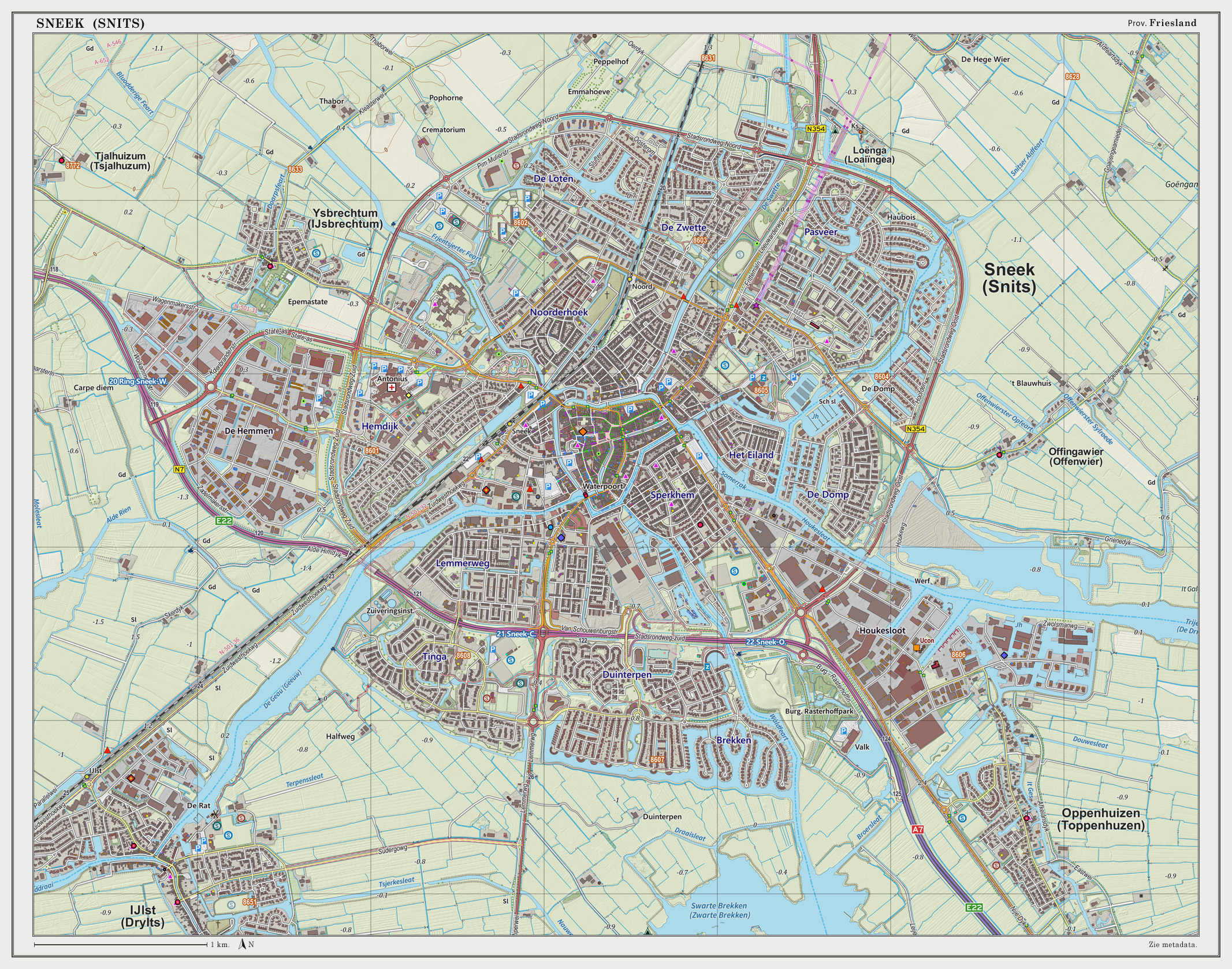
Topographic map of Sneek, as of June 2014

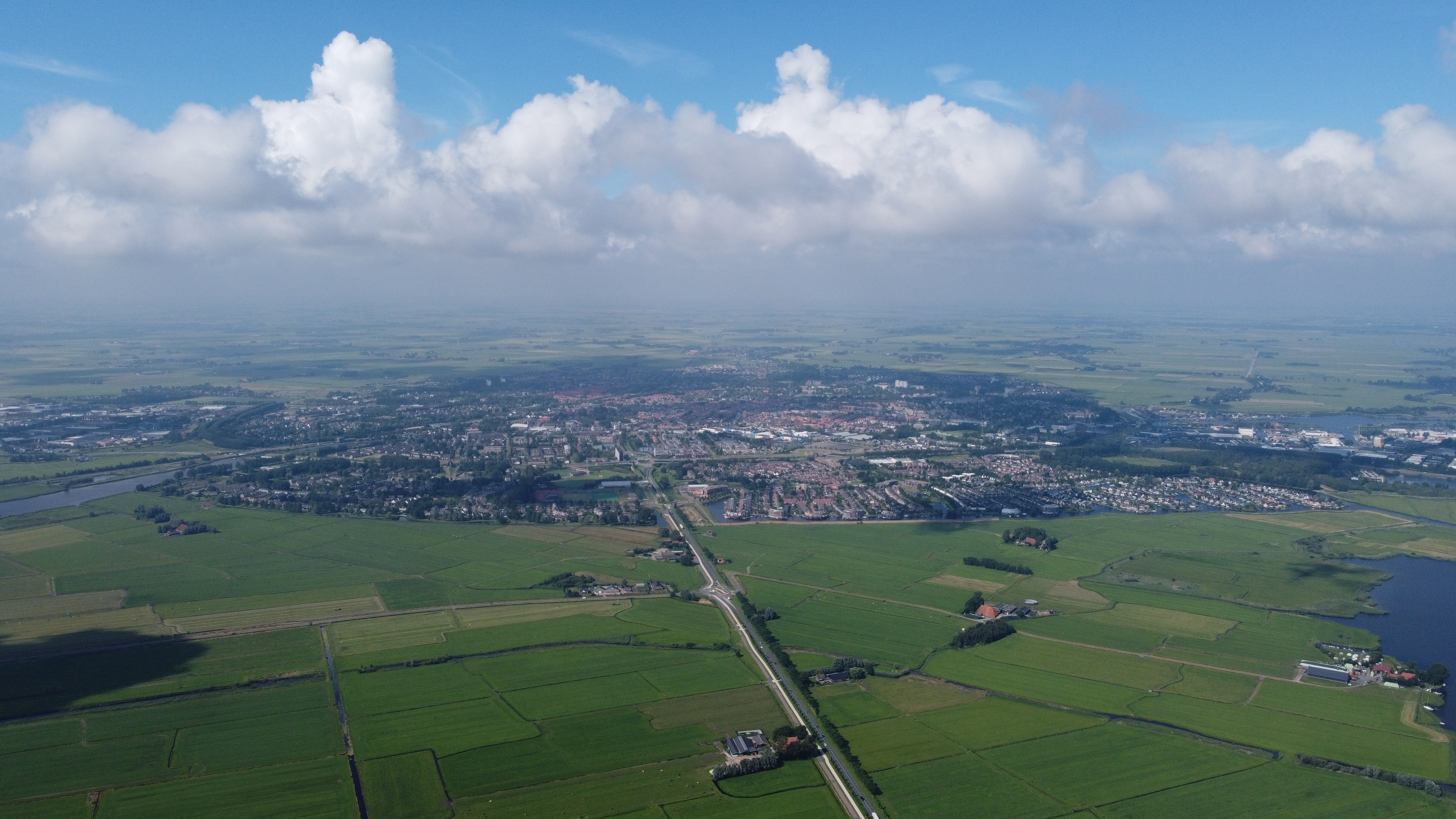
Sneek from the air (2022)

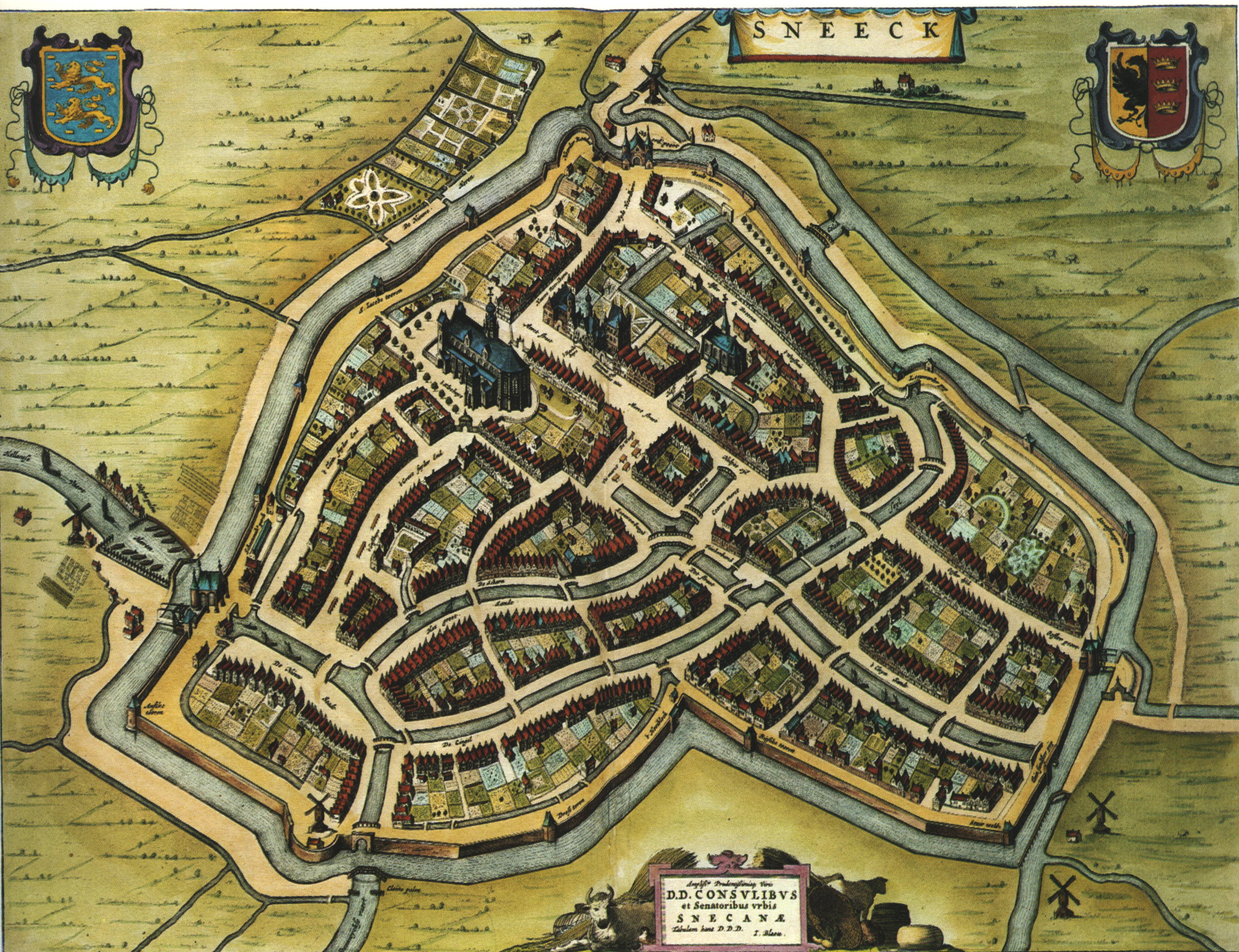
Sneek on a map by Willem and Joan Blaeu in 1652

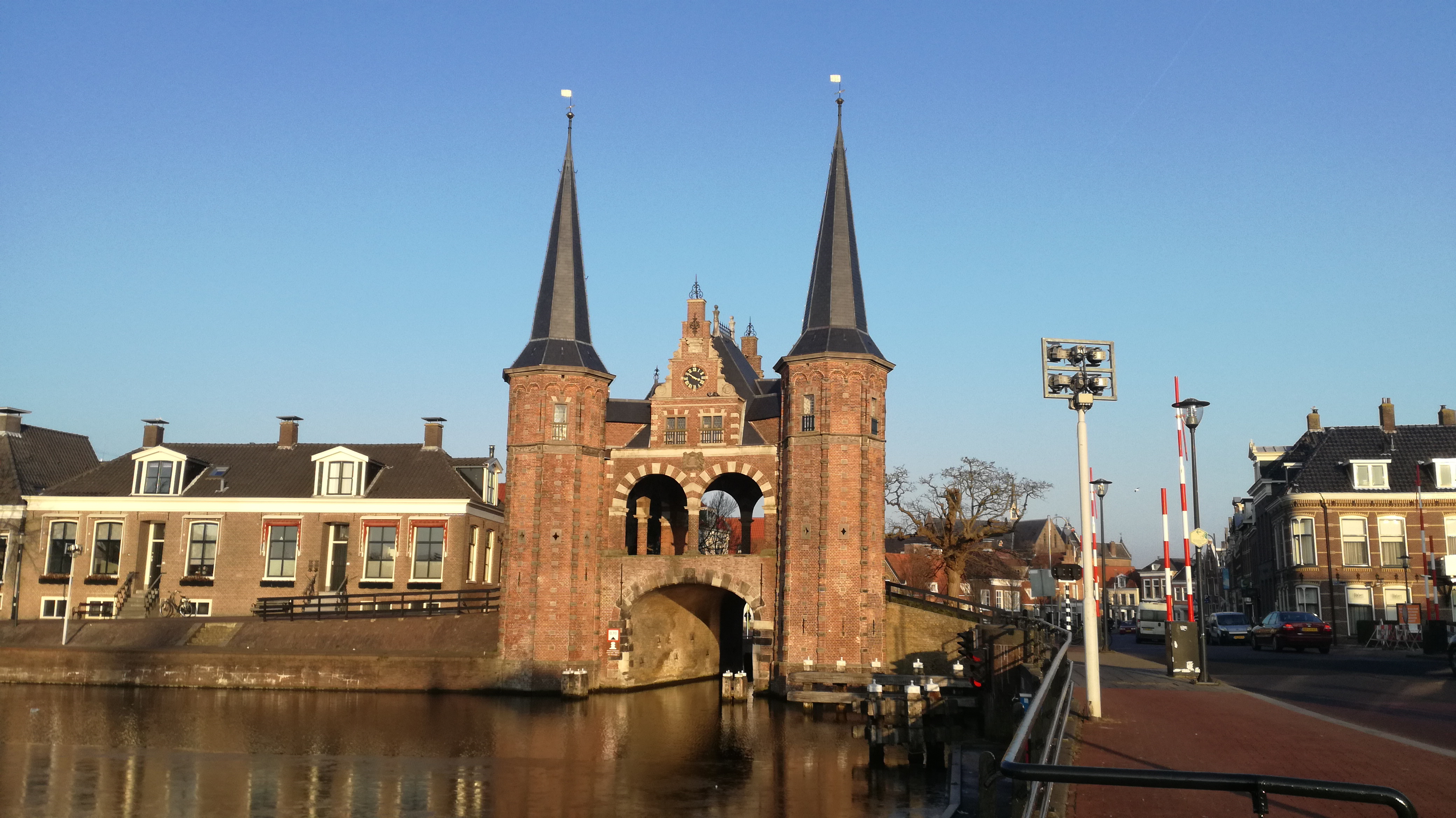
Waterpoort (2017)

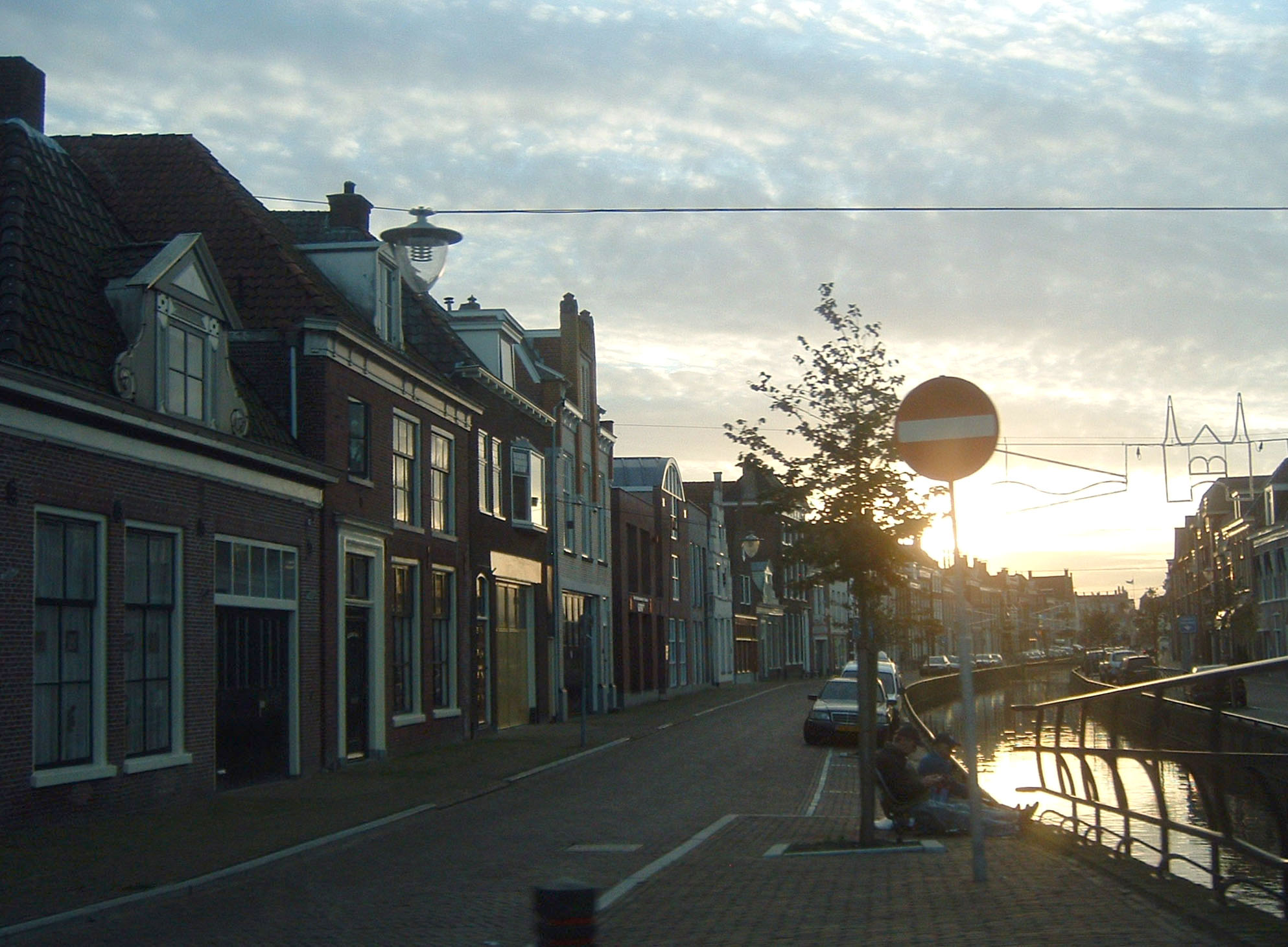
Kleinzand Canal in Sneek (2006)

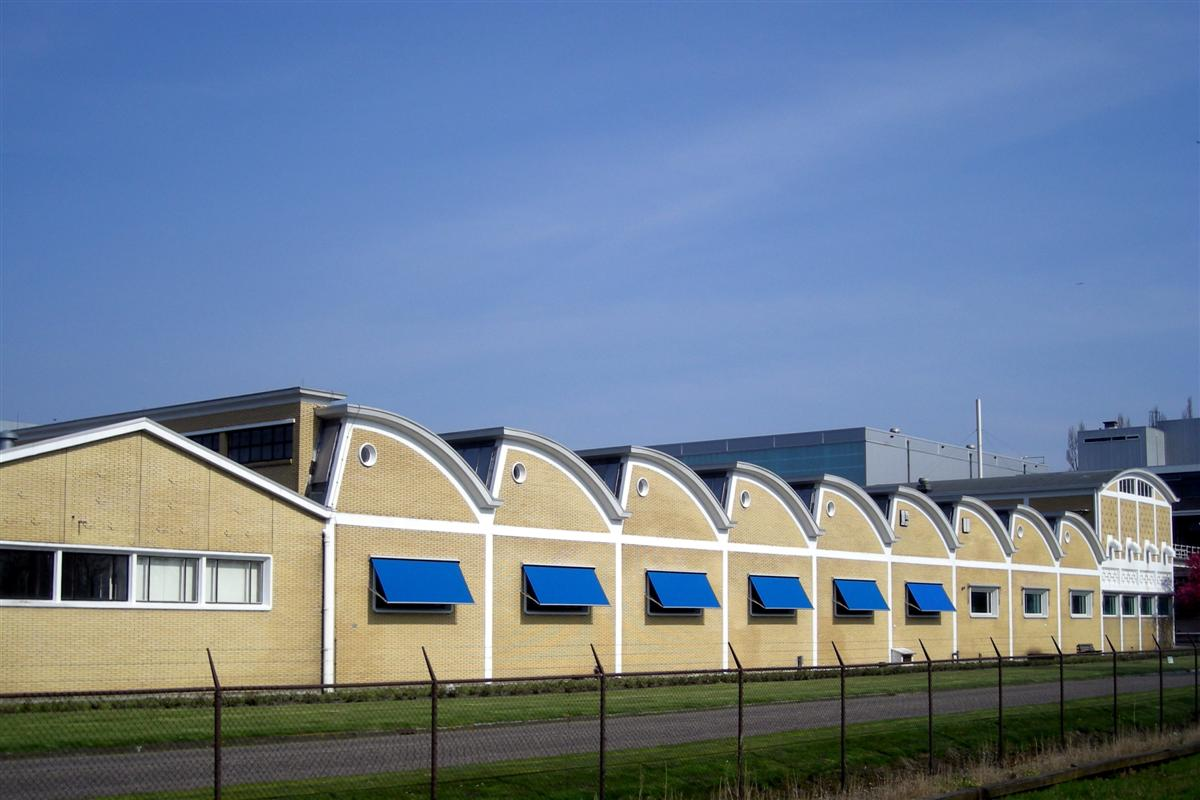
Tonnemafabriek (confectionery factory) (2008)

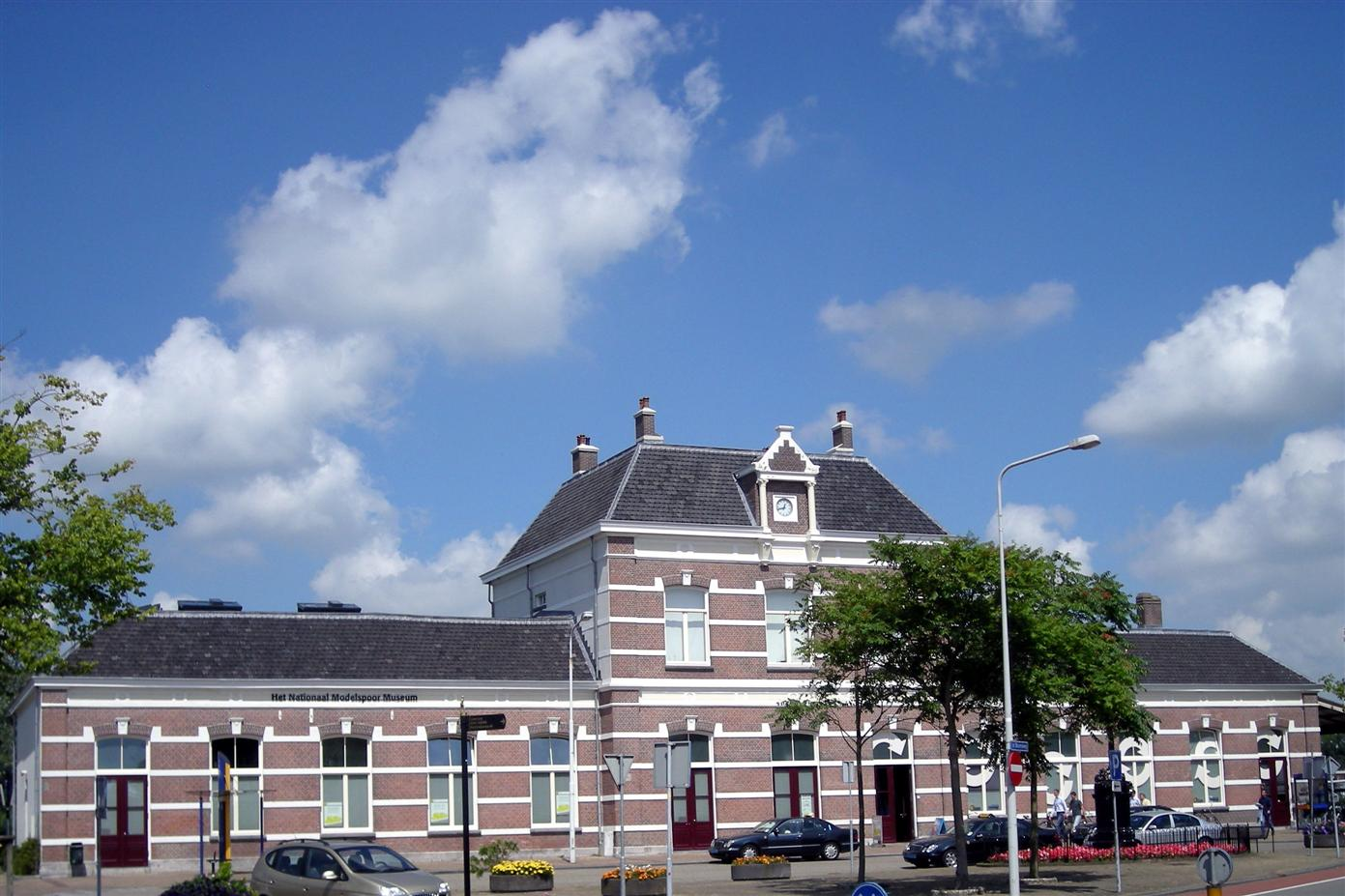
Sneek railway station (2007)

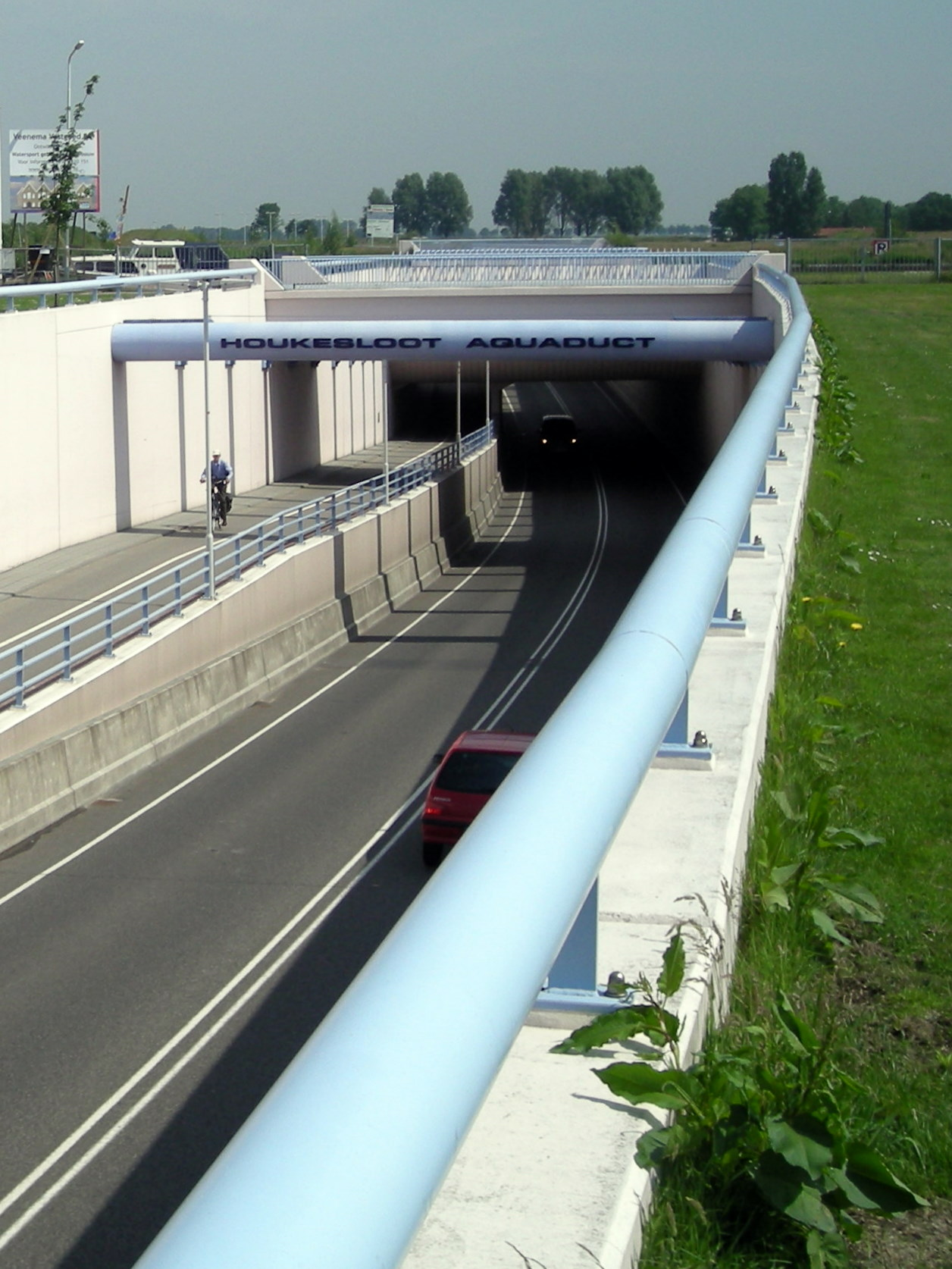
Houkesloot Aqueduct (2007)

Sneek (Dutch pronunciation: [sneːk]; West Frisian: Snits [snɪts]) is a city southwest of Leeuwarden and the seat of the former municipality of Sneek in the province of Friesland, Netherlands. As of 2011 it is the seat of the municipality of Súdwest-Fryslân (Southwest Friesland). The city had approximately 34,850 inhabitants in January 2024.

Sneek is situated in Southwest Friesland, close to the Sneekermeer, and is well known for its canals, the Waterpoort (Watergate, the symbol of the city), and watersports (hosting the annual Sneekweek, the largest sailing event on inland European waterways). Sneek is one of the Friese elf steden ("Eleven cities of Friesland"). The city is very important in the southwestern part of Friesland (called the Zuidwesthoek, or Southwest Corner).

== History ==
=== History ===
Sneek was founded in the 10th century on a sandy peninsula at the crossing site of a dike with an important waterway (called the Magna Fossa in old documents). This waterway was dug when the former Middelzee silted up. The dike can still be traced in the current street pattern and street names like Hemdijk, Oude Dijk, and Oosterdijk.

Sneek received several city rights in the 13th century, which became official in 1456. Sneek then became one of the eleven Frisian cities. This was also the beginning of a period of blooming trade for the city that would last until about 1550. In 1492 construction of a moat and wall around the city began. In those days Sneek was the only walled city in Friesland. The Waterpoort and the Bolwerk remain today.

Before 2011, the city was an independent municipality.

=== Sister city Kurobe ===
Since September 10, 1970, Sneek and the Japanese city of Kurobe have been sister cities. In 1970, Mayor L. Rasterhoff of Sneek visited the city of Kurobe and was named an honorary citizen. Mayor H. Terade of Kurobe made a visit to Sneek in 1972. In 2000 delegations of both cities visited each other again. The Japanese showed the citizens of Sneek a "Sneekplein", which was built in Kurobe.

=== Language ===
Sneek has its own dialect (called Snekers) that dates back to the Dutch language before 1600. Snekers is part of the Stadsfries dialects.

== Trade and industry ==
The clothing store C&A started in 1841 with a store in Sneek. The Candyfactory Leaf produces Peppermint under the name KING as well as chewing gum (Sportlife) and various other sweets. The name "KING" has nothing to do with the English word 'king'; it stands for Kwaliteit in niets geëvenaard ("Quality equaled by nothing"). Sneek also has steel, machinery and rope factories. Since 1964 there is a factory of Yoshida YKK from Kurobe. Besides that, the supermarket branch Poiesz, clothing brand Gaastra and Frisian gin called beerenburg from Weduwe Joustra are products that have their roots in Sneek.

== Places of interest ==
Sneek is well known as the center of watersports with over 130 watersport companies and 13 Marinas. It also has a historic inner city replete with houses of old upper-class families.

- Waterpoort (1613)
- Sneek Town Hall (1550)
- Grote of Martinikerk (Protestant, 1498), with a carillon of 50 bells
- St. Martin's Church (Catholic, 1872)
- Tonnema Candy Factory (1955)
- Dúvelsrak and Krúsrak, wooden bridges across the A7 motorway.

== Transport ==
By road, Sneek is connected to the A7 motorway and N354

Sneek is connected by rail through its main station Sneek railway station and the Sneek Noord railway station on the Leeuwarden-Stavoren railway line operated by Arriva.

Buses in the town are operated by Qbuzz.

Sneek is connected to other cities by four main waterways: Houkesloot, leading to the Prinses Margriet Canal; River de Geeuw, leading to IJlst; de Zwette, leading to Leeuwarden; Franekervaart, leading to Franeker.

== Art and Culture ==
=== Museums ===
- Fries Scheepvaart Museum Frisian Maritime Museum
- Nationaal Modelspoor Museum National Model Train Museum

=== Podia ===
- Het Bolwerk, very first poppodium of Friesland, since 1975. Member of the Fries Popnet.

=== Cultural Quarter ===
In 2010 there will be a Cultural Quarter, The municipality has made plans to connect various Cultural areas into one big Cultural Quarter. The total costs of the plans are about €35,000,000 and include

- The Noorderchurch will house a theatre and a Center of the Arts (CvdK - Centrum voor de Kunsten)
- The Bolwerk will house another part of the CvdK
- A new Theatre (Capacity of 600 people) at the location of the former postoffice-building
- The connection between the Theatre and the Bolwerk with a walking bridge and a floating podium in the city canal. This part won't be constructed because of high costs.
- The Public library and the Martinichurch will be linked to the Cultural Quarter

=== Silver Ball ===
The Culture Award of Sneek is called The Silver Ball and has been awarded 11 times. The award is given annually to a person that has done an improvement/good job on the areas of Music and Culture for Sneek and its surroundings. Some of the winners are:

- Henk van der Veer, writer
- 2005: Maaike Schuurmans, musical actress
- 2006: Yede van Dijk, actor
- 2007: Bennie Hoogstra, 25 years playing the Drum- & Showkorps Advendo

=== Events ===
- Sneekweek, Sailevent on the Sneekermeer
- Swinging Sneek, live-music in cafés and on street

== Education ==
Sneek has eleven primary schools and three high schools.

== Sport ==
=== Sports centres ===
- Sportcentrum Schuttersveld
- Sportpark Noorderhoek
- Sportpark SWZ Sneek
- Sportpark Leeuwarderweg
- Swimming pool It Rak
- Zuidersportpark

=== Sport Clubs ===
- Sneek Wit Zwart(SWZ), football club
- LSC 1890, one of the oldest football clubs in the Netherlands
- ONS Sneek, football club
- Black Boys, football club
- Waterpoort boys, football club
- Sneeker MHC, hockey club
- VC Sneek, volleyball club
- Neptunia'24, water polo club
- L.T.C. NOMI, tennis club
- White Cats Sneek, baseball and softball club

=== Sportevents ===
- Elfstedentocht Eleven city ice skating race and tour
- Fietselfstedentocht Eleven city cycling tour

== Notable people ==
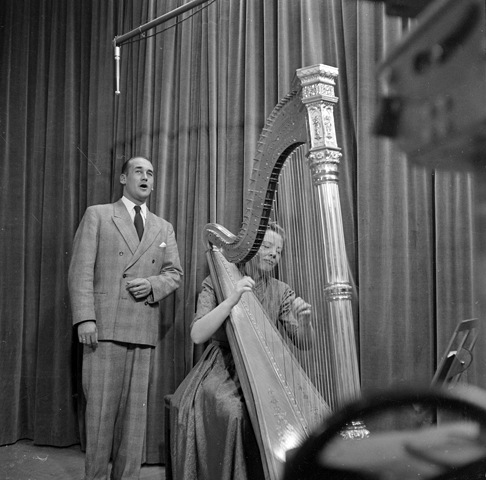
Kees Deenik and Phia Berghout in 1951

- Rienck Bockema (ca. 1350–1436)
- Pier Gerlofs Donia (ca. 1480–1520), Frisian freedom fighter, rebel and pirate 'Grutte Pier'
- Joachim Hoppers (1523–1576), jurist and politician of the Habsburg Netherlands
- Murk van Phelsum (1730–1799), physician
- Nicolaas Molenaar (1850–1930), architect
- Jakob van Schevichaven (1866–1935), detective writer
- Geert Aeilco Wumkes (1869–1954), theologian and historian
- Willem de Sitter (1872–1934), mathematician, physicist and astronomer
- Pieter Sjoerds Gerbrandy (1885–1961), politician
- Frits Wissel (1907–1999), pilot, discoverer of the Wissel Lakes in New-Guinea.
- Klaas Dijkstra (1895–1969), advocate of pseudoscience (Flat Earth)
- Kees Deenik (1915–1993), singer, TV producer
- Dieuwkje Nauta (1930–2008), teacher, politician
- Bart Tromp (1944–2007), sociologist
- Wiebe Nijenhuis (1955–2016), strongest man of Friesland 1982–1984
- Joke Tjalsma (1957), actress
- Toon Gerbrands (1957), coach and manager
- Pauline Krikke (1961), politician
- Manon Thomas (1963), television presenter
- Jan Posthuma (1963), international volleyball player
- Ronald Zoodsma (1966), international volleyball player
- Monique Sluyter (1967), model and television star
- Olof van der Meulen (1968), volleyball player
- Rixt Meijer (1982), speed skater and cyclist
- Sherida Spitse (1990), soccer player
- Nyck de Vries (1995), Racing Driver

== Living ==
Sneek has around 17,143 houses. Half of those houses are rental houses. There are new projects in different neighbourhoods.

== Extra Information ==
In 1519–1520, the Frisian warlord and freedom fighter Pier Gerlofs Donia spent his last days in Sneek. Donia died peacefully in bed at Grootzand (Sneek) 12 on 18 October 1520. Pier is buried in Sneek in the 15th-century Groote Kerk (also called the Martinikerk). His tomb is located on the north side of the church.

The city has a shopping center that is walker- and biker-friendly. There are high-end clothing stores, restaurants, bars, music stores, cafes, coffee shops, and an old-fashioned candy store.

George Simenon's 1937 novel L'assassin, about a doctor who murders his wife and her lover, is set in Sneek.
