= Murk van Phelsum =

Dutch physician

Murk van Phelsum (6 August 1732, probably Leeuwarden - 21 August 1779, Sneek) was a Dutch physician, who was the namesake for the lizard genus Phelsuma.

Van Phelsum started his medical studies on 17 November 1754 at the university of Franeker (Netherlands), where he later earned his doctorate. He settled down as a medical doctor first in Bolsward and from 1764 in Sneek.

He wrote:

- Historia physiologica ascaridum (Physiological history of roundworms) (Leeuwarden, 1762)
- Explicatio patrium pythographiae L. Plukneti (Explanation of the origins of pythography by Leonard Plukenet) (Haarlem, 1769)
- Natuurkundige verhandeling over de wormen die veeltijds in de darmen der menschen gevonden worden. (Natural science treatise on the worms commonly found in the intestines of humans.) (Leeuwarden, 1767), translated into German by Joh. Weisse (Gotha 1780-92)
- Vertoog over de gemakkelijkste wijze om geknelde darmbreuken binnen te brengen. (Discourse on the easiest way to insert intestinal hernias) (Sneek 1772)
- Brief aan den heer C. Nozeman over de gewelfstekken of zeeëgelen, waarachter gevoegd zijn twee beschrijvingen, de eene van een zeker soort zeewier en de andere van maden in een vuile verzwering gevonden. (Letter to Mr Nozeman on the sea urchins, after which are added two descriptions, one of a certain type of seaweed and the other of maggots found in a dirty ulcer.) (Rotterdam 1775)
- Twee brieven rakende de verhandeling van den heer Tissot over de vallende ziekte. (Two letters regarding the treatise by Mr Tissot on the falling sickness.) (Amsterdam 1776) Note: Falling sickness refers to epilepsy.
- Verhandelingen over tot de genees- en natuurkunde behoorende onderwerpen. (Treatise on subjects in medical and natural science.) (Franeker 1776)

His library was sold on 13 March 1780.
