= Joachim Hoppers =

Dutch jurist and politician (1523–1576)

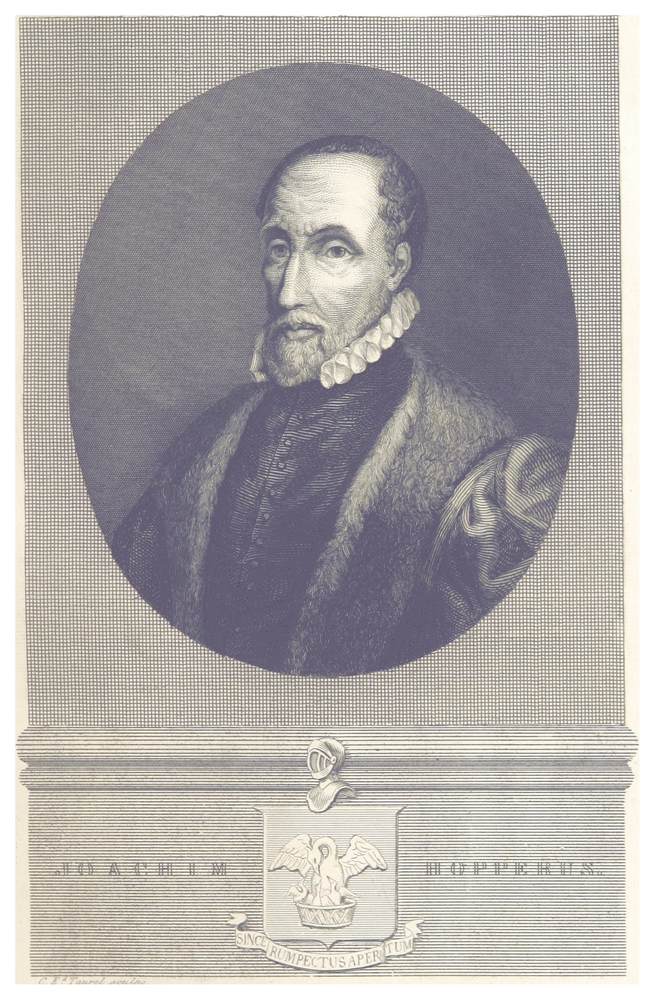
- Hoppers, 1849
- Born: 11 November 1523; Sneek, Habsburg Netherlands
- Died: 11 December 1576 (aged 53); Madrid, Spain
- Occupations: Jurist; professor; politician

Joachim Hoppers, occasionally Latinized to Hopperus (11 November 1523 – 11 December 1576), was a jurist and professor in the Habsburg Netherlands. He was advisor on matters affecting the Netherlands to Philip II of Spain.

After attending the Latin School of Haarlem, Hoppers studied law and philosophy in Leuven, Paris and Orléans. He received his doctorate in 1553. After this he became a professor in Leuven and – partly due to his friendship with Viglius – councilor at the Great Council of Mechelen, a member of the Privy Council and a member of the Council of State. He also became Secretary of State for Dutch affairs in Madrid in 1566 and thus advisor to Philip II. In that capacity he wrote an overview of the events of 1566 in the Netherlands, known as the Recueil de Hopperus. He condemned the riots but, as an Erasmian, disapproved of Philip's harsh measures against the Beeldenstorm.

Hoppers came from Sneek and was very loyal to Friesland. This is evident from parts of the Tabula, a work about a flourishing period in Friesland, among others, which he wrote in Frisian. The map he made of Friesland in Roman times is the first in the history of cartography.

He founded the University of Douai on behalf of Philip in 1561. Here he was able to apply his educational ideas which he described in Ferdinandus, sive de institutione principis. This shows that he was more professor than statesman.

== Gallery ==
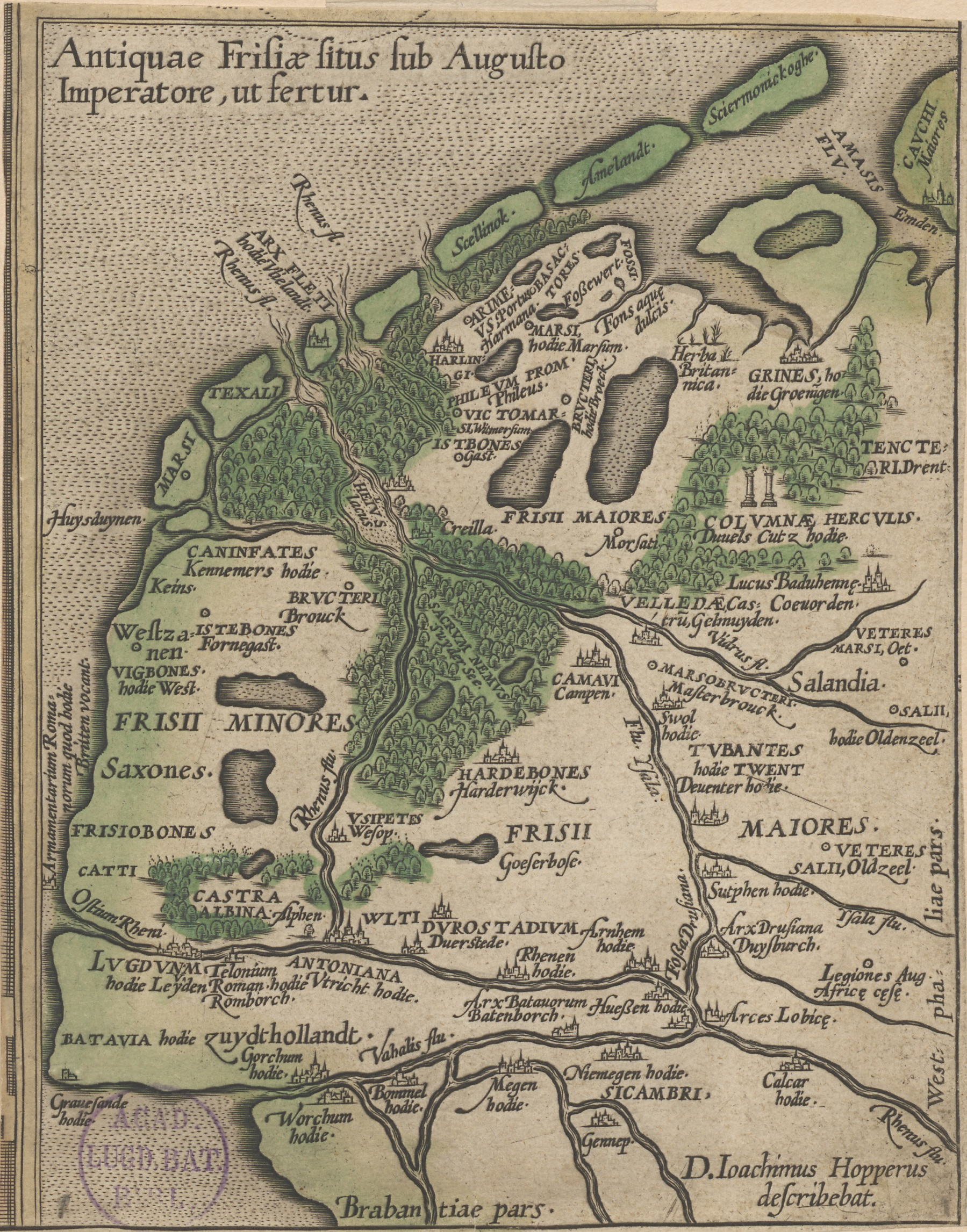
Antiquae Frisiae situs sub Augusto Imperatore, ut fertia, 1579

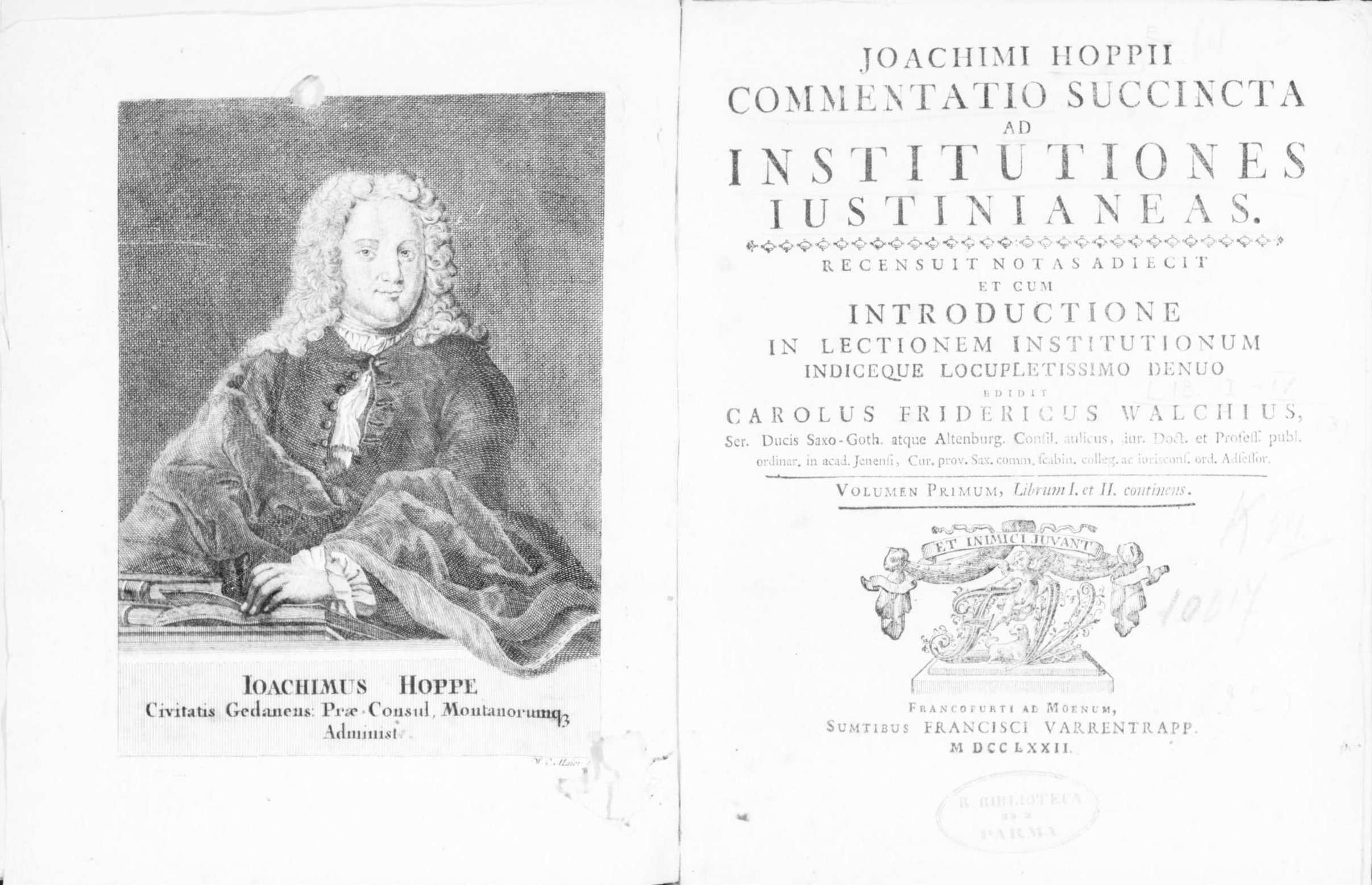
Commentatio succinta ad Institutiones iustinianeas, 1772

== Bibliography ==
- Seduardus sive de vera iurisprudentia (Antwerp, 1590), including the Tabula and Ferdinandus, sive de institutione principis
- Paraphrasis in psalmos Davidicos (Antwerp, 1591)
- Recueil et mémorial des troubles des Pays-Bas du Roy (1743)
- Epistolae ad Viglium (Utrecht, 1802)
