= Wiebe Nijenhuis =

Dutch weightlifter

Wiebe Nijenhuis (Sneek, 30 January 1955 – IJlst, 1 April 2016) was a Dutch sportsperson. He was the Frisian strongest man between 1982 and 1984. After his career he was still active in the sport, including being a referee at the Frisian weightlifting championships a week before his death. He unexpectedly died at 61 on 1 April 2016.

== Personal ==
Nijenhuis had his own cycling store in IJlst and celebrated the 25-anniversary on 1 September 2015.
