= Stettin–Stargard maritime trade war =

Trade war in the Holy Roman Empire (1454–1464)

The Stettin–Stargard maritime trade war, also known as the Wheat War, was an armed conflict fought between the cities of Stettin (now Szczecin) and Stargard in Pommern (Stargard) in the Holy Roman Empire, over primacy in maritime trade, lasting from 1454 to 1464, with roots dating back to the mid-14th century.

The war was caused by mutual disregard for de facto conflicting privileges. Stettin had the staple right (all ships leaving the duchy were required to dock at the port of Stettin), while Stargard possessed the right of free and tariff-free navigation to the Baltic Sea. During the conflict, there were numerous skirmishes between the adversaries, with the most tragic being the Stargard attack on Stettin on 22 February 1460, when 6 guards of the Tariff Bridge were killed, and several dozen people were taken captive. The war ended as a result of mediation by Hanseatic cities in November 1464.

== Origin ==
The conflict between the two cities began in 1295 when, as a result of the division of Pomerania, Stargard found itself in the Duchy of Wolgast, while Stettin and the maritime port of Stargard were in the Duchy of Stettin. Although in 1311 Duke Wartislaw IV of Wolgast confirmed all the privileges granted to Stargard, including its town rights in 1243, later reaffirmed by Duke Barnim I in 1253, including the right to free trade along the entire Ina river and the use of its mouth, Stettin continued to hinder Stargard's trade exchange. (Note: The date of granting municipal rights to Stargard is disputed. It is believed that in 1243, the rights were granted by the Bishop of Kamień, and 10 years later, after taking over the lands, by Duke Barnim I of Stettin. Those who support the year 1243 include: Teske (1843, pp. 11–13), Boehmer (1903, pp. 27–31), Wehrmann (1904, pp. 111–119). And the year 1253: Kratz (1865, p. 357) and Lesiński (1969, p. 99).)

In 1344, the Stettin domain was taken over by Barnim III, who ceased to honor Stargard's earlier privileges. This forced the Stargardians to pay double tariff: the first on the so-called "Goleniów planks", and the second at the port of Ihnamünde (Inoujście). Stargard, unwilling to pay taxes, obtained another confirmation of its rights to tariff-free navigation in the duchy's waters from Duke of Wolgast in 1355. However, this did not significantly change the attitude of the Stettin dukes. Consequently, in 1374, the Stargardians paid 7,000 silver grzywnas to Duke Swantibor I to exempt them from tolls at these two locations. Following the Hanseatic victory over Denmark and the Treaty of Stralsund concluded in 1370, all cities belonging to the league had the right to free passage through the Danish Straits. However, Stargard merchants preferred to monopolize the area of Pomerania, dealing almost exclusively with wheat trade – most of the Pomeranian wheat was transported through Stargard (e.g., in 1363, 260 last of wheat were shipped from here to Lübeck). The dispute did not abate for long. It reignited in the 1380s when Stettin merchants, with the knowledge and consent of Duke Bogislaw VII, attacked Stargard ships in the port of Inoujście. In addition to such actions, Stettin also unsuccessfully attempted to incite Gollnow (Goleniów) against Stargard.

At the turn of the 14th and 15th centuries, Stettin had completely subordinated most of the cities in the lower Oder region - including Greifenhagen (Gryfino), Altdamm (Dąbie), and Pölitz (Police) - to itself. Only Stargard and, to some extent, Gollnow maintained their independence in the catchment area of this stretch of the Oder. Stettin citizens were well aware of Stargard's trading power and directed their actions towards slowing down the city's commercial development. In 1408, Stettin merchants appealed to Duke Swantibor I of Stettin to prevent the export of grain from the duchy. They argued that the inhabitants of Stolp (Słupsk) were taking identical actions against Stettin, allegedly at the instigation of Stargard. The dispute between the two cities also had a broader perspective. In the event of Stettin's defeat, the cities dominated by it could gain trade independence. In 1409, Stargard obtained another confirmation of its rights. Unable to act in other areas, Stettin began a diplomatic offensive against its neighbor. Its result was the confirmation of existing privileges and exemption from tariffs on the waters and roads of Pomerania, issued by Duke Sigismund of Luxembourg. Additionally, the Stettin city council and merchant guilds issued a ban on the purchase of grain by people outside the duchy's borders. Violation of this law threatened confiscation of the transported goods. The ultimate way to deal with Stargard was to reconfirm the rights issued in 1447, which forced it to contribute municipal goods in Stettin. An open conflict between Stargard and Stettin was only a matter of time, as the people of Stargard had no intention of submitting to Stettin.

== Course of the conflict ==
The conflict began in the spring of 1454 when the people of Stettin destroyed the port of Ihnamünde and blocked the southern mouth of the Ina river. In response, the people of Stargard initiated a diplomatic action to contest the actions of Stettin and partially unblocked the river channel. They lodged complaints with Duke Eric II of Stolp, Duke Wartislaw IX of Wolgast, and Bishop Henning of Kamień. In their letters, they informed the recipients about the damages inflicted by the enemy, the trade reprisals, and accused Stettin of unlawfully collecting tariffs on the Gollnow logs. Additionally, in response to Stettin's attack, Stargard began collecting tariffs on goods from Stettin transported through the city into the depths of Farther Pomerania and Greater Poland.

=== Chains on the Mill Gate towers in Stargard ===
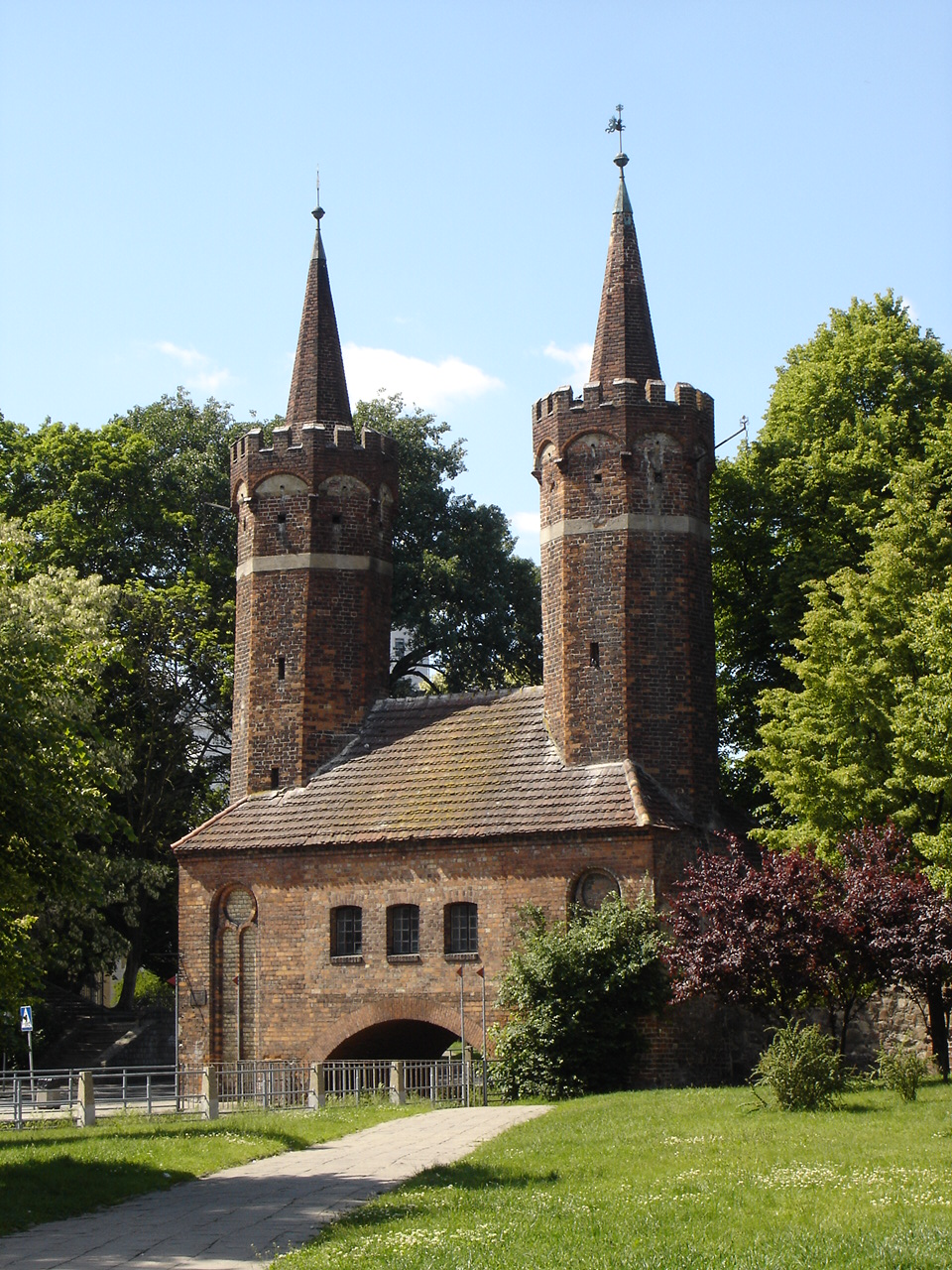
Mill Gate in Stargard

In 1454, the people of Stettin, to prevent river transport, besides blocking to the riverbed, stretched chains between the banks in an attempt to stop barges from Stargard. As a result of these actions, the people of Stargard appealed to the duke to settle the dispute. He ruled in favor of the merchants from Stargard. As a sign of victory and contempt for the people of Stettin, they tore down the chains obstructing the river channel and hung them on the Mill Gate, where they remain to this day.

=== Assembly of the estates of the Duchy of Wolgast ===
As a result of the complaint to Wartislaw IX, an assembly of the estates of the Duchy of Wolgast was convened. On 14 July 1454, the assembly issued a decision in defense of Stargard and reaffirmed its navigational rights. It was also emphasized that as long as the people of Stettin continued to destroy the fleet of Stargard, none of the Stettin merchants would be allowed to sail through the Peene or Świna rivers, which were under the jurisdiction of the dukes of Wolgast. Accepting the resolutions of the assembly of the estates, the Duke of Wolgast acknowledged that if Stettin did not change its stance towards Stargard, he would be forced to intensify reprisals against its merchant fleet. This indeed happened in 1454, when several Stettin ships with their cargo were detained in Wolgast. In 1455, the disputes were apparently suspended, as Stargard and Stettin jointly participated in the resolution of the dispute between Kolberg (Kołobrzeg) and Lübeck.

=== Year 1457 ===
The conflict reignited in 1457 when Stargard merchants began to use the northern branch of the Ina estuary as a port, as they had not been able to completely clear the southern channel, which had been blocked in the spring of 1454. The reaction from the people of Stettin was particularly harsh because, according to the privileges of that city, the people of Stargard were not allowed to use that estuary. Additionally, they reminded of the provisions of the privilege granted in 1301, which awarded the entire water area between Krępa and the northern arm of the Ina to Stettin. Duke Otto III, under the influence of the people of Stettin, sent his envoys to Stargard to warn the citizens of the consequences of violating the privilege from 1301. As mediators, Chancellor Jasper von Guntersberg was first sent, followed by Joahum von Mellentin, who made special efforts to resolve the dispute.

=== Year 1458 ===
The next escalation of the dispute occurred in early 1458, when merchants from Stettin once again attacked merchants from Stargard and destroyed port buildings. This triggered an open trade war between the two cities. They sent fleets to the Stettin Lagoon and the Baltic Sea with the task of attacking each other's ships. Despite Stettin's clear advantage, the people of Stargard managed to capture a Stettin ship led by Hans Jesse in the spring of 1458, and then several smaller vessels. Due to the military actions, the turnover of Stargard merchants sharply declined in the summer of 1458. In a complaint filed by Stargard on 4 November 1458, to the arbitration court of the Hanseatic cities, merchants listed the material losses incurred by individual townspeople. For example, Jakub Grosere lost goods worth 1000 guilders, Clawess Vipher was robbed of goods worth 600 guilders on his way to Wołogoszcz, and Bleken Sultze estimated his losses at 3000 guilders. The Stargard trade suffered the greatest losses (10,000 guilders) in the summer of 1458 when the people of Stettin attacked their convoy on the Świna river. In addition to goods, they also stole ships and barges at that time. Because blocking the southern mouth of the Ina river and destroying port buildings did not completely halt Stargard's trade, in June 1458, they blocked the Domiąża river channel between Mnisi Ostrów and the mouth of the Ina.

=== Allies and mediators ===
Both cities began seeking allies. In February 1454, the people of Stettin sent out information to the Hanseatic cities stating that Stargard was violating the old privileges of the city. The main ally of Stettin became Duke Otto III of Stettin. He ordered all merchants passing through his duchy to go to the capital to sell their goods. Another mediator in the dispute was Duke Adolf of Anhalt. In 1458, with the authority of Emperor Frederick III of the Holy Roman Empire, he sent letters to the councils of both cities requesting an analysis of the opponent's arguments. He called for the signing of peace. Until then, the warring cities were to suspend military actions. Duke Adolf's mission ended in failure because Stettin deemed the concessions to Stargard to be too far-reaching, while the people of Stargard felt that the duke was not sufficiently favorable to their city.

In October 1458, the court of the Bishop of Kamień issued a verdict stating that all land and waterways are public, and thus belong to all inhabitants. Such a ruling was not favorable to Stettin. Finally, in late 1458, Lübeck, the main city of the Hanseatic League, took steps to ease the dispute, as it was concerned about ending the conflict due to ongoing battles with Poland. Lübeck merchants proposed that the dispute be resolved by a voluntary court of the Hanseatic cities. Both cities agreed to this proposal, although they did not cease military actions. Due to Lübeck's clear sympathy for Stargard, Stettin – through Duke Otto III – convened an assembly of the estates of the Stettin duchy, which again confirmed the privileges of the city, with an emphasis on the staple rights.

=== Voluntary court of the Hanseatic cities ===
The voluntary court of the Hanseatic cities included representatives from Stralsund, Greifswald, Anklam, and Demmin. Before the court, both cities presented their arguments. In a memorial dated 8 May 1459, the people of Stettin agreed to have the dispute settled by the court, which, according to them, should examine the legal force of the privileges of both cities. They argued that their privileges held greater significance than those of Stargard, justifying, among other things, the destruction of the port in Ihnamünde. Stettin did not dispute the rights of Stargard as such, but rather their validity within the territory of the Stettin duchy. Confident that the court would rule in their favor, the people of Stettin concluded the memorial by stating that they must now await a just resolution of the dispute.

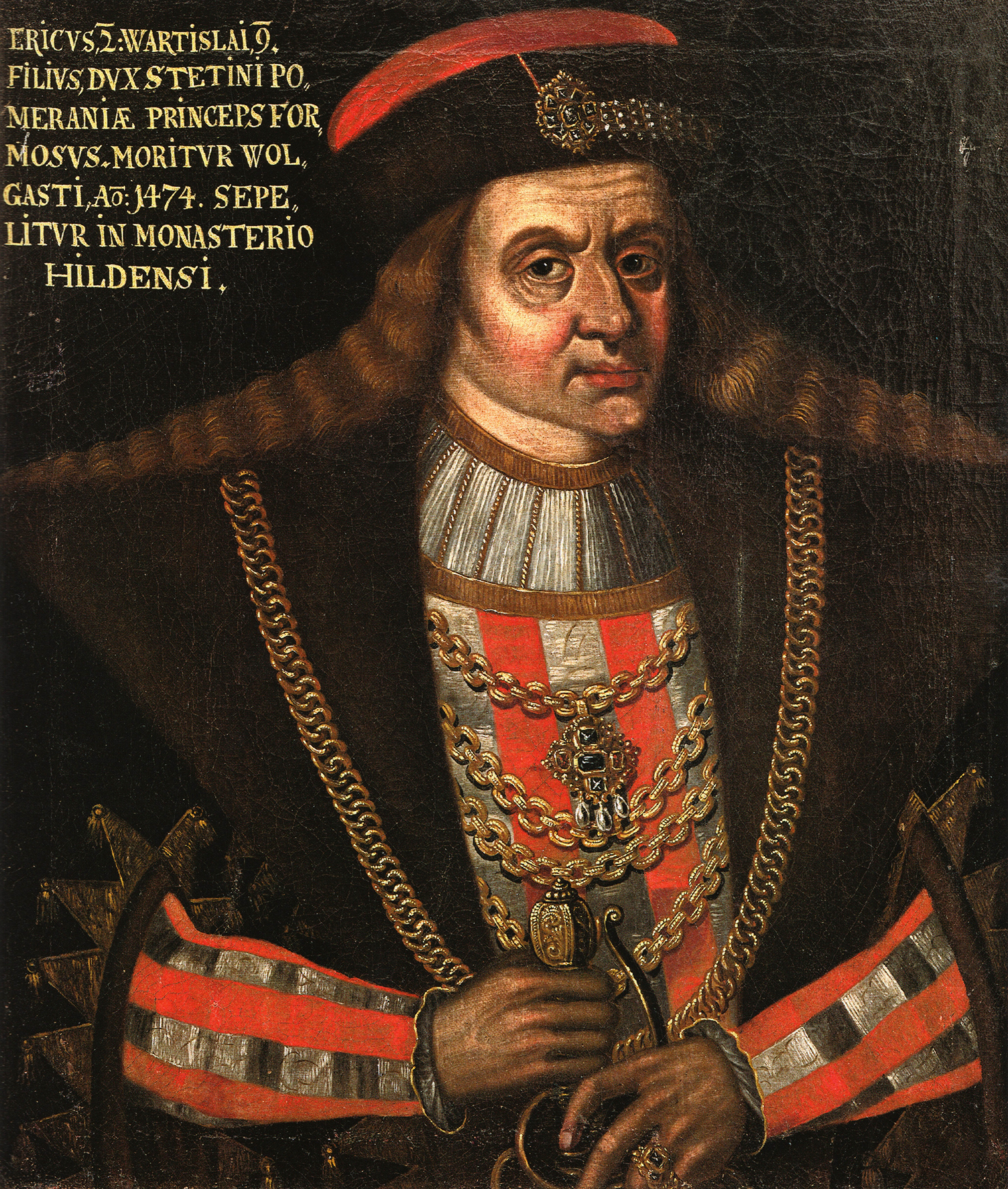
Duke Eric II of Stolp, an ally of Stargard

During this time, the people of Stargard also sent a relevant letter to the court. In it, they reminded that the people of Stettin were violating all the privileges of the city and preventing maritime contacts with the Hanseatic cities. Moreover, they believed that the privileges held by Stettin did not justify their military actions and plundering of Stargard's fleet and goods. In the letter, Stargard estimated its losses at 300,000 gulden, while Stettin's losses due to unpaid tariffs amounted to 20,000 gulden. Additionally, the supporting prince of Stargard, Duke Eric II of Stolp, estimated the losses incurred in the conflict at 150,000 gulden. The resolution of the dispute was expected to come on 28 March 1459, at the congress of princes and estates in Kolbatz (Kołbacz). However, no verdict was issued because Stettin accused Stargard at the last minute of detaining their merchants in Danzig (Gdańsk) and Gotland.

Due to the further intensification of Stettin's plundering activities, Stargard lodged a complaint again on 1 April 1459, this time to Lübeck. During this period, the people of Stargard stopped using Ihnamünde and increasingly used the waterway through the Dziwna river to the port of Dievenow (Dziwnów). This reduced the likelihood of goods being stolen by Stettin. In the letter to Lübeck, Stargard also requested a convoy for transports to Dievenow.

In April 1459, the people of Stettin confiscated the ship of Andreas Goritz and Mertan Vicke, which contained 6 lasts of resin and other goods. Also in April, the voluntary court resumed its work. On 8 May 1459, the court issued an order to conclude a truce by June of that year. Additionally, both cities were required to return the plundered goods, and in case of their sale, to pay compensation and release all prisoners. This decree also reinstated freedom of navigation on the waters to the state before the conflict. Furthermore, both cities were to pressure their rulers (Stettin to Otto III and Stargard to Eric II) to reach a suitable agreement. Moreover, both cities were to enter into an alliance with neighboring Hanseatic cities to resolve any future disputes peacefully. If any of these points were not fulfilled or if the dispute persisted, the final resolution would be sought at a congress of Hanseatic cities in Lübeck. The court would include delegations from Lübeck, Hamburg, Stralsund, Wismar, and Rostock.

In the autumn of 1457, on the market in Barth, merchants from Stralsund were robbed by courtiers of Eric II, the Duke of Słupsk, who favored Stargard. As the duke did not punish those responsible for the act, relations between Stargard and Stralsund (which was supportive of Stettin) deteriorated significantly. On 25 May 1459, the people of Stargard and Duke Eric II blocked the Świna river and began collecting increased tolls. This action sparked a dispute between the duke and most of the Hanseatic cities. Stettin, seizing the opportunity, set out at the end of May to unblock the river by force. Additionally, the people of Stettin destroyed the castle of the Duke of Stolp in Przytór. Furthermore, on 16 June 1459, the assembly of estates of the Duchy of Pomerania in Rügenwalde (Darłowo) did not recognize Eric II as their ruler, but only as an administrator. Also, the Dukes of Stettin and Wolgast conspired against the Duke of Stolp, gaining the favor of the margrave of Brandenburg. The poor relations of Stolp with its neighbors also worsened the position of Stargard. The anticipated congress of Hanseatic cities, scheduled for June 1459, did not take place, and the conflict itself intensified in the summer of that year. On 21 September 1459, the people of Stargard once again lodged a complaint with Lübeck, pointing out that Stettin was again violating Stargard's privileges. In the autumn of 1459, Stralsund and the Duchy of Wolgast sided with Stettin, halting Stargard's goods in their city. In response, the city council of Stargard prohibited its residents from docking at the port of Stralsund and exhibiting goods in its market square.

=== Year 1460 ===
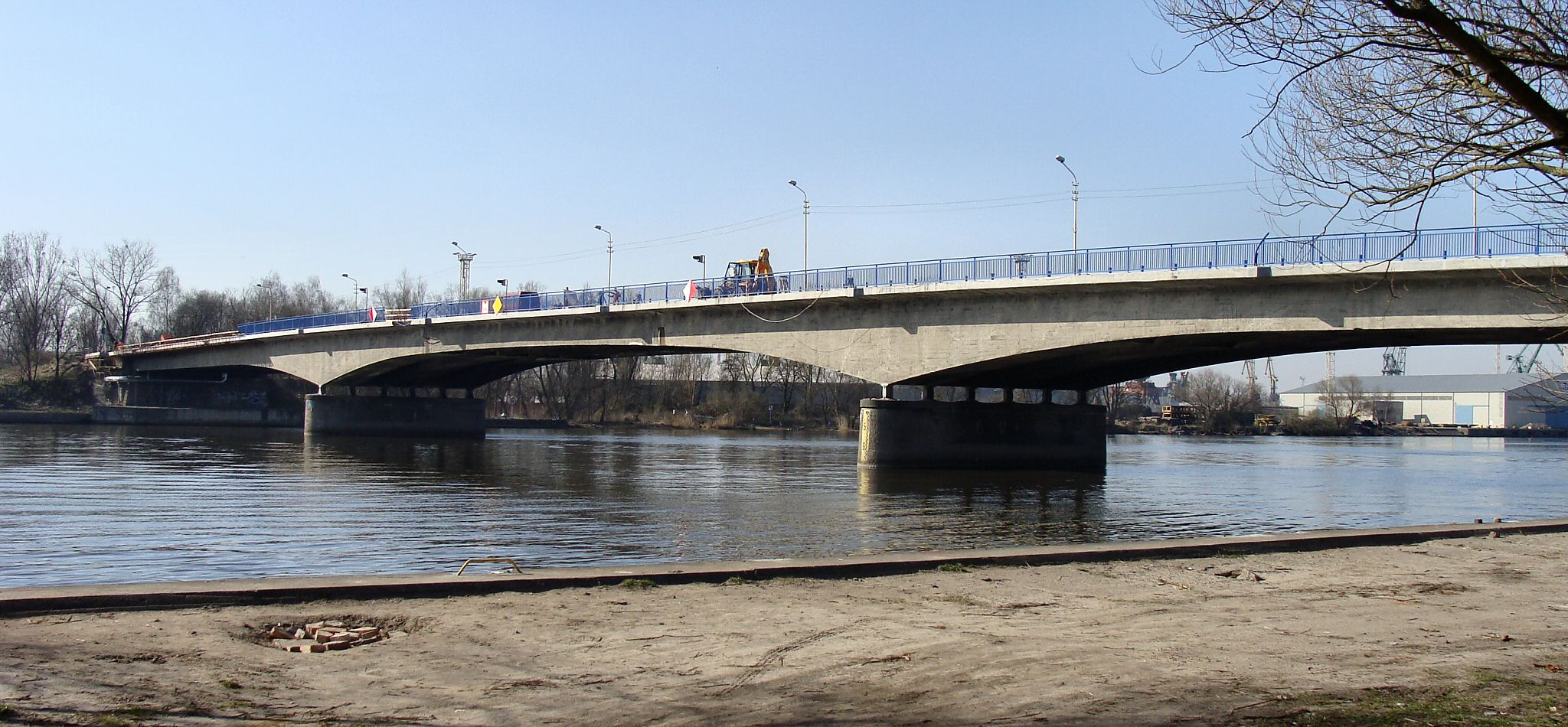
Modern-day Tariff Bridge in Szczecin in 2009

At the turn of 1459 and 1460, Duke Eric II decided to forcefully oppose some of the Hanseatic cities. Actions of unspecified nature affected the burghers of Wolgast, Lassan, and Usedom, as well as some nobles from the Duchy of Wolgast. Feeling the support and approval of Eric II, on 22 February 1460, Stargard launched a military attack on the outskirts of Stettin. The Tariff Bridge on the Regalica river was completely burnt down during the attack. Six bridge guards were killed during the offensive, and several dozen were taken prisoner. Additionally, most of the weaponry from the outskirts was plundered (including muskets, crossbows, arrows, and gunpowder). During the retreat, Stargard also looted and destroyed the village of Wilhelmsfelde (Czarna Łąka), which belonged to Stettin, even setting fire to the church. At the same time, the city council of Stargard requested protection from Lübeck with its fleet of ships from Stargard. On 19 April 1460, Lübeck sent three of its ships, Catherine, Gabriel, and Peter, to Ihnamünde. The convoy was led by Gert Kortsacke, who purchased 200 lasts of grain in Stargard. He then safely transported them on his vessels to Lübeck. Additionally, the people of Stargard lodged a complaint against the people of Stettin in Danzig, asking for their ships to ensure continuous trade between the two cities. In May 1460, Duke Wartislaw X of Wolgast sent several ships under the command of Gerd von Schwerin to the Baltic Sea against Stargard as reinforcements for the Stettin units. The expedition managed to capture two Stargard ships en route to Lübeck.

The ultimate blow to Stargard was supposed to be the attack on the city in June 1460. The assault was prepared by the citizens of Stettin along with the troops of Otto III and Wartislaw X. The expedition was led by Ulrich II, the Duke of Mecklenburg. The siege of Stargard was launched on 25 June 1460, while the inhabitants were driving cattle to pasture on the outskirts. Stargard, well fortified, also had vigilant guards who promptly closed the city gates. The attack on the high defensive walls failed; instead, the people of Stettin burned down the suburbs and stole the cattle from the pastures. Contrary to Eric's expectations, the coalition of Otto and Wartislaw against Stargard and Stolp did not fall apart. On the contrary, it was strengthened by Stralsund, which in the summer of 1460 sent its privateers to the Baltic Sea against Stargard. Subsequently, significant losses were suffered by Stolp, Rügenwalde, and Treptow an der Rega (Trzebiatów). To alleviate the ruined economic situation of Stargard, help was also sought at the Polish court. Merchants hoped for broad trade cooperation. Despite Stargard's favorable reception in Poland, this did not change the city's difficult situation.

=== End of the dispute ===
In 1461, due to exhaustion on both sides, a temporary calmness in the conflict prevailed. Stargard and Stolp, as well as Stettin and Stralsund, sought possibilities for a peaceful resolution of the dispute. In April, the city council of Greifswald attempted to reconcile the parties through mediation, but without much success. Then, on 17 May 1461, at the congress of the combined estates of the duchies of Stettin, Wolgast, and Stolp in Kolberg, another attempt was made to bring about the signing of a peace treaty, also without result. Towards the end of 1461, Stettin and Stargard probably signed a ceasefire because there is no information about hostile actions by either city. Stargard was particularly keen to end the fighting because in 1462 it lost its greatest ally – Eric II. In July 1462, the dukes of Stettin and Wolgast, along with the King of Denmark, joined forces to drive the duke out of Stolp. Eric was pushed to the northeast, where he controlled the area around Łeba. As a result, he was forced to make peace and confirm Stettin's privileges, which also led to partial concessions by Stargard.

== Peace ==
The final resolution of the dispute was achieved through the mediation of the Hanseatic cities, which led to the convening of an arbitral tribunal in Anklam in the spring of 1464. After six months of negotiations, in November 1464, Stargard, along with Stettin and Stralsund, signed a peace treaty.

=== Wreath of Unity ===
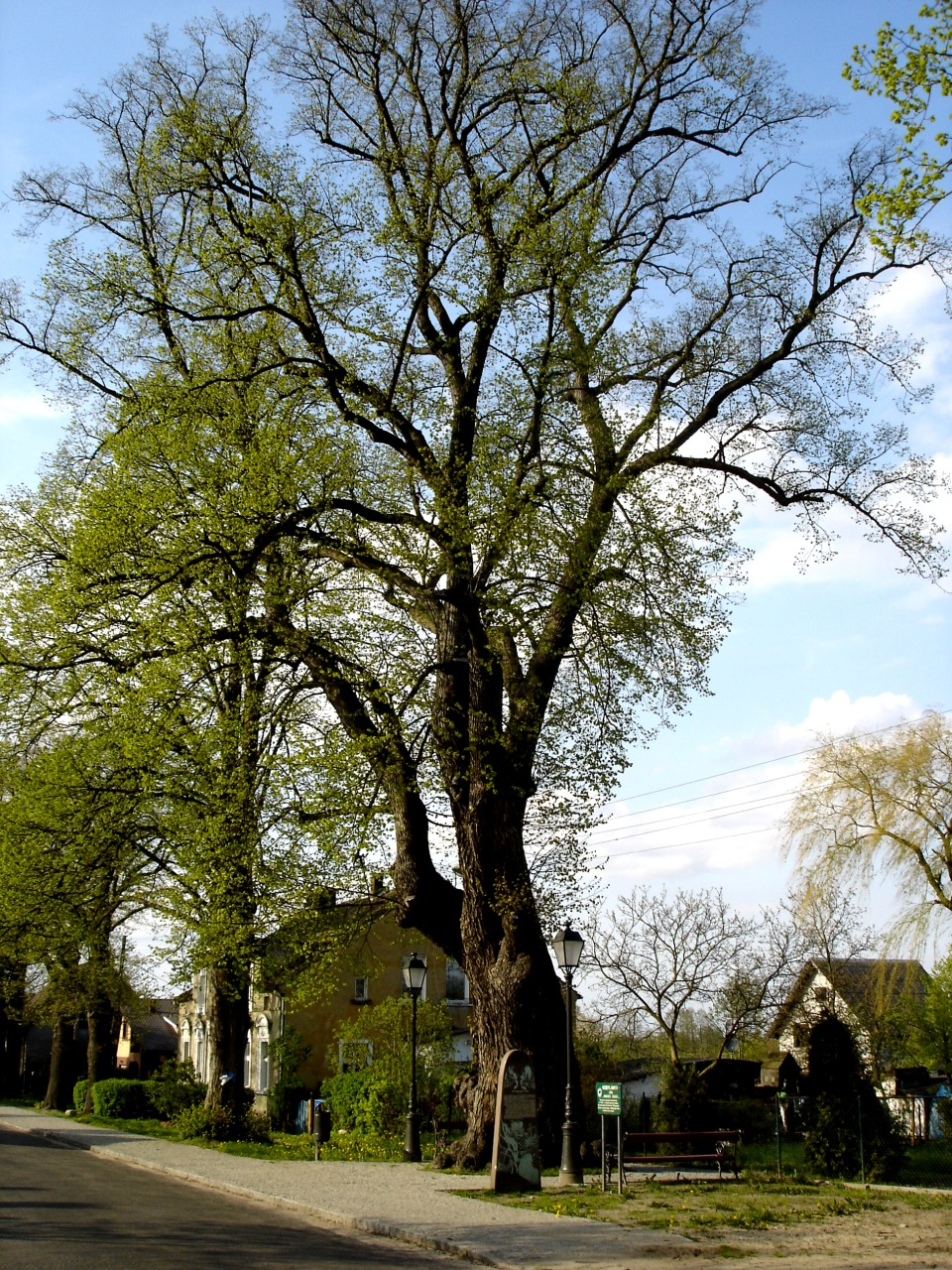
"Wreath of Unity" linden in Kobylanka

In 1460, halfway between Stargard and Stettin – in Kublank (Kobylanka) – the mayors of both cities planted a linden called the "Wreath of Unity" as a gesture intended to put an end to the struggle for primacy in maritime trade. The linden continues to grow to this day and is now a natural monument. Since then, every hundred years, the authorities of both cities plant another tree there. Since that time, six lindens have been planted, of which five have survived to this day, as the tree planted in 1960 dried up.

== Port of Ihnamünde (Inoujście) ==
=== Determinants of establishment ===
Changes in trade and navigation at the turn of the 12th and 13th centuries were associated with the spread of a new type of boat – the cog. These new vessels were characterized by greater cargo capacity and draft, allowing them to transport larger quantities of goods, but they required deeper ports for docking. As a result, the Slavic port in Stargard began to lose its importance because the Ina river proved to be too shallow for these new vessels. Additionally, the establishment of new ports was also influenced by internal factors such as the development of colonization, the founding of new settlements, and deforestation.

=== Date of establishment ===
The difficulties in determining the exact location of Stargard have implications for dating the port in Ihnamünde (Inoujście) because one of the privileges granted at that time was free navigation on the Ina river, which led to the establishment of the port. Therefore, it can be presumed that the port was established no earlier than 1243 (i.e., the earliest possible date of Stargard's foundation). There are also documents from 1220 claiming that the port already existed and belonged to the Kołbacz Abbey, but they are considered to be forgeries.

=== Location and construction ===
In 1268, Barnim I granted Gollnow (Goleniów) municipal rights. Along with these rights, the city received 120 ploughlands of arable land, 30 ploughlands of pasture, and the Ina river, one mile upstream from Gollnow and downstream to its mouth. The port of Gollnow was probably founded on the southern branch of the river, on the opposite bank from the port of Stargard. Unlike Gollnow, Stargard did not receive official rights to its own port with its foundation. This fact changed only with the privilege of 1289, which granted the city lands at the mouth of the Ina and the right to build a customs house. The area of the port on the western side belonged to Stargard, while on the eastern side it belonged to Gollnow. By this time, the port was already fully formed, containing warehouses, sheds, wharves, and docks, in addition to the customs houses.

== See also ==
- Conflict over rafting on the Rega

== Bibliography ==
- Boehmer, Felix (1903). Geschichte Stadt Stargard in Pommern. Vol. I. Stargard.
- Friedeborn, Paul (1613). Historische Beschreibung der Stadt Alten Stettin in Pommern. Alten Stettin.
- Gaziński, R. (1985). "Port Inoujście w średniowieczu". Materiały Zachodniopomorskie. Vol. XXXI.
- Gaziński, R. (1993). "Wojna Szczecina ze Stargardem o handel morski (1454–1464)". Materiały Zachodniopomorskie. Vol. XXXIX.
- Kalita-Skwirzyńska, K. (1983). Stargard Szczeciński. Wrocław.
- Kratz, G. (1865). Die Städte der Provinz Pommern. Berlin.
- Lesiński, H. (1969). "Zarys dziejów Stargardu od XIII do końca XVIII w.". In Dopierała, B. (ed.). Z Dziejów Ziemi Stargardzkiej. Poznań.
- Olszewski, E. (2001). Stargardzkie abc. Stargard.
- Rogosz, R. (1973). "Początki Stargardu w świetle dotychczasowych badań archeologicznych". Materiały Zachodniopomorskie. Vol. XIX.
- Teske, M. (1843). Geschichte der Stadt Stargard. Stargard.
- Wehrmann, M. (1904). Geschichte von Pommern. Gotha.
- Archiwum Książąt Szczecińskich. I/6331. Archiwum Państwowe w Szczecinie.
