= Inoujście =

- Village
- Location within Poland
- Coordinates: 53°32′N 14°39′E
- Country: Poland
- Voivodeship: West Pomeranian
- County: Goleniów
- Gmina: Goleniów
- Population: 0
- Time zone: UTC+1 (CET)
  - Summer (DST): UTC+2 (CEST)

Inoujście [inɔˈui̯ɕt͡ɕɛ] (German: Ihnamünde) is a former village in the administrative district of Gmina Goleniów, within Goleniów County, West Pomeranian Voivodeship, in north-western Poland. It lies approximately 12 km (7 mi) west of Goleniów and 14 km (9 mi) north of the regional capital Szczecin. It is located within the historic region of Pomerania.

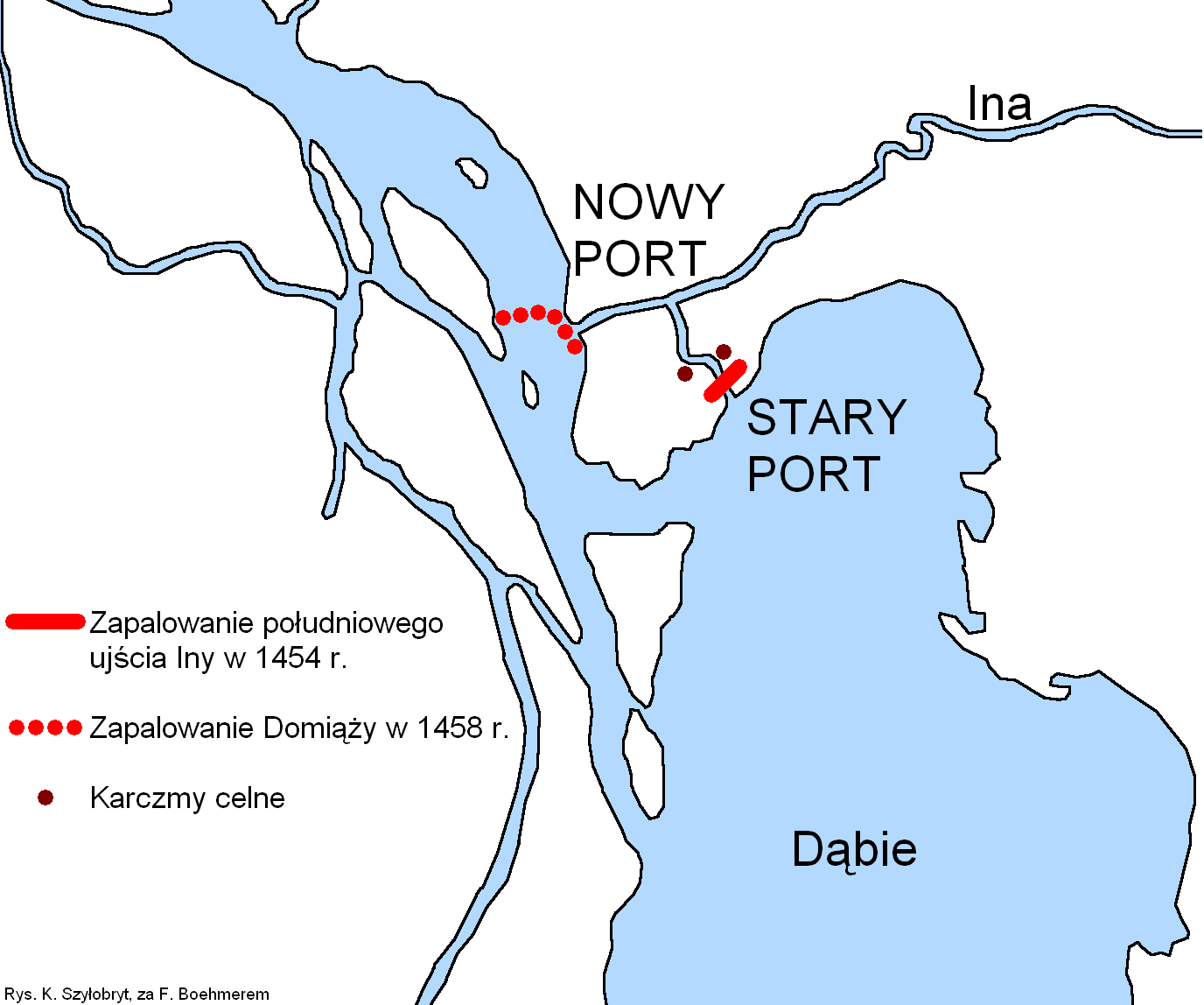
Inoujście during the war between the cities of Szczecin and Stargard in the 15th century

The settlement was founded as a port of the city of Stargard in the 13th century. The village was destroyed during World War II.

== See also ==
- Stettin–Stargard maritime trade war
