= St. Martin's Church, Bolsward =

Church in Bolsward, Netherlands

Coordinates: 53°03′52″N 5°31′35″E

St. Martin's Church Grote kerk Martinikerk
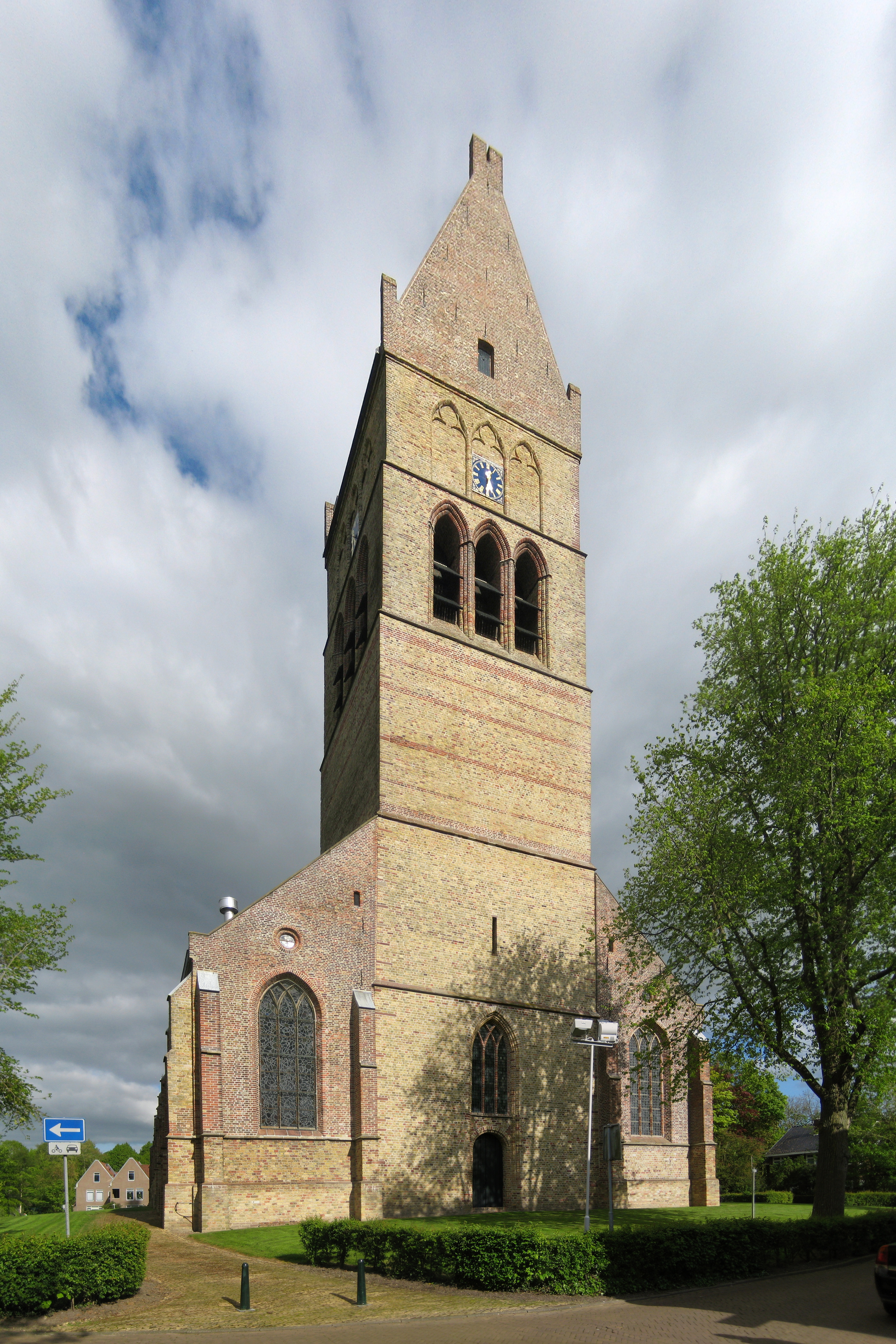
- The Martinikerk in 2014
- St. Martin's Church; Grote kerk Martinikerk
- Denomination: Protestant

History
- Dedication: Saint Martin

Clergy
- Pastor: Rev. J Ariesen

St. Martin's Church (also Grote kerk or Martinikerk; West Frisian: Martinitsjerke) is a Protestant church in Bolsward, Netherlands, and one of the medieval churches in Friesland. The current church was built between 1446 and 1461, the small medieval church which stood at that location previously was demolished to build the new one. The tower of the church was built in the 15th century and the gabled roof was added in the 17th century. It became a Protestant church during the Reformation. There was a major renovation which, apart from work on the tower, ended in 1955.

The church is located at the Groot Kerkhof 24 in the centre of Bolsward.

It was listed as a Rijksmonument in 1968. It remains in active use, with a weekly Sunday service.
