= Bolsward =

Bolsward Boalsert
- City and former municipality
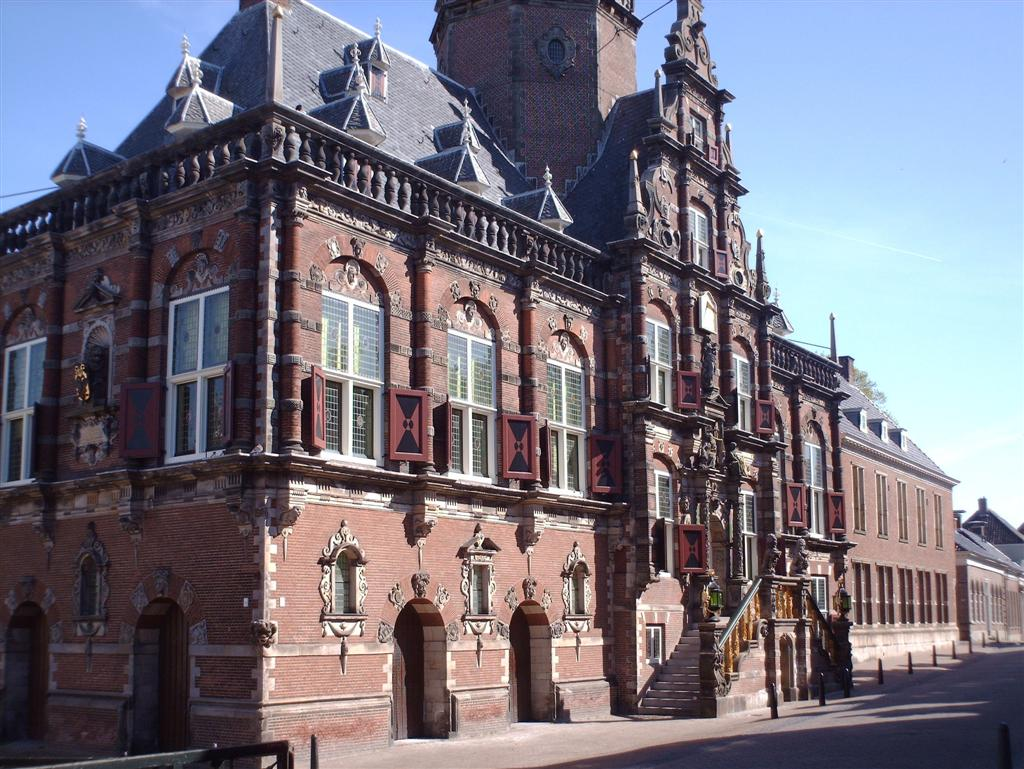
- City Hall

- Flag Coat of arms

- Location in the Netherlands Bolsward (Netherlands)
- Coordinates: 53°04′N 5°32′E
- Country: Netherlands
- Province: Friesland
- Municipality: Súdwest-Fryslân

Area
  - Total: 9.42 km^{2} (3.64 sq mi)
- Elevation: 0.5 m (1.6 ft)

Population (2021)
  - Total: 10,085
  - Density: 1,070/km^{2} (2,770/sq mi)
- Time zone: UTC+1 (CET)
  - Summer (DST): UTC+2 (CEST)
- Postal code: 8700-8702
- Dialing code: 0515

Bolsward (Dutch pronunciation: [ˈbɔlsʋɑrt], West Frisian: Boalsert) is a city in Súdwest-Fryslân in the province of Friesland, the Netherlands. Bolsward has a population of just under 10,200. It is located 10 km W.N.W. of Sneek.

== History ==
The town is founded on three artificial dwelling mounds, the first of which was built some time before Christ. During the Middle Ages, Bolsward was a trade center and port city connected to the North Sea via the Middle Sea. This connection was lost when the Middle Sea was reclaimed to form arable land. After this, a canal was dug to the Zuiderzee. The town is first mentioned in AD 725.

As a trading city, Bolsward was granted city rights by Philip the Good in 1455. Bolsward was made a member of the Hanseatic league in 1422. Before being merged into the municipality of Súdwest-Fryslân, the town of Bolsward was an independent municipality.

=== Notable historical figures ===
Notable historical figures born here include:

- Juw Juwinga or Jonghema (14th century), 11th potestaat of Friesland
- Petrus Thaborita (1450–1527), historian
- Boetius Adamsz Bolswert (c.1580-1633), engraver
- Schelderic Adamsz Bolswert (c.1586-1659), engraver
- Gysbert Japiks (1603–1666), poet
- Frederick Philipse (1626–1702), American progenitor and founder
- Willem Muurling (1805–1882), theologian
- Titus Brandsma (1881–1942), Carmelite philosopher

== Events ==
Heamiel. A local festival of four days in June. This is an old traditional festival to celebrate that the farmers have finished harvesting the hay from the fields. The name of the festival, Heamiel, is Frisian for 'Hay meal', and is derived from the traditional banquet.

Bolletongersdei. Bolletongersdei is Frisian for 'bulls Thursday'. Bolletongersdei includes a street market. Bolletongersdei is held on the first Thursday of October.

Simmerwike. A festival of four evenings with musical performances, held in August.

=== Elfstedentocht ===
Bolsward is one of the eleven Frisian cities in which the Elfstedentocht, a speed skating marathon, is held. Because the marathon depends on the thickness of the ice, it is not held on a regular schedule and is somewhat rare. Nonetheless, a man from Bolsward, Bennie van der Weide, has participated in the Elfstedentocht.

Bolsward is also the host city for the yearly Cycling Elfstedentocht, a road bicycle racing tour.

== Notable buildings ==
- Protestant church of Bolsward
- Gysbert Japicx House, birth place and museum about Gysbert Japiks.
- Broerekerk (burned 1980, repurposed 2006)
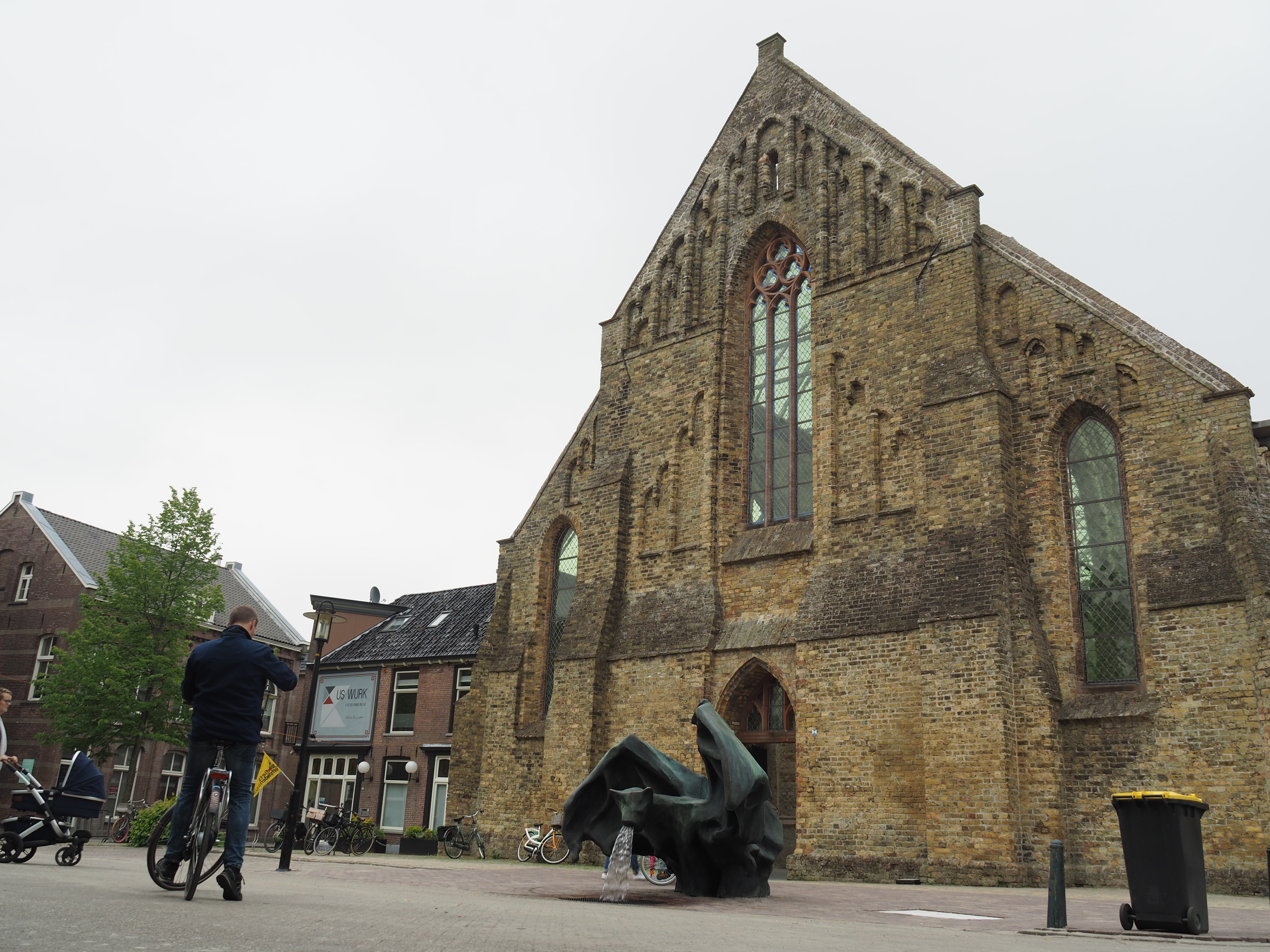
  The Broerekerk in 2018 with bat fountain in front from Leeuwarden-Friesland European Capital of Culture 2018.
