= Eleven Cities Cycling Tour =

Cycling tour held in Friesland, the Netherlands

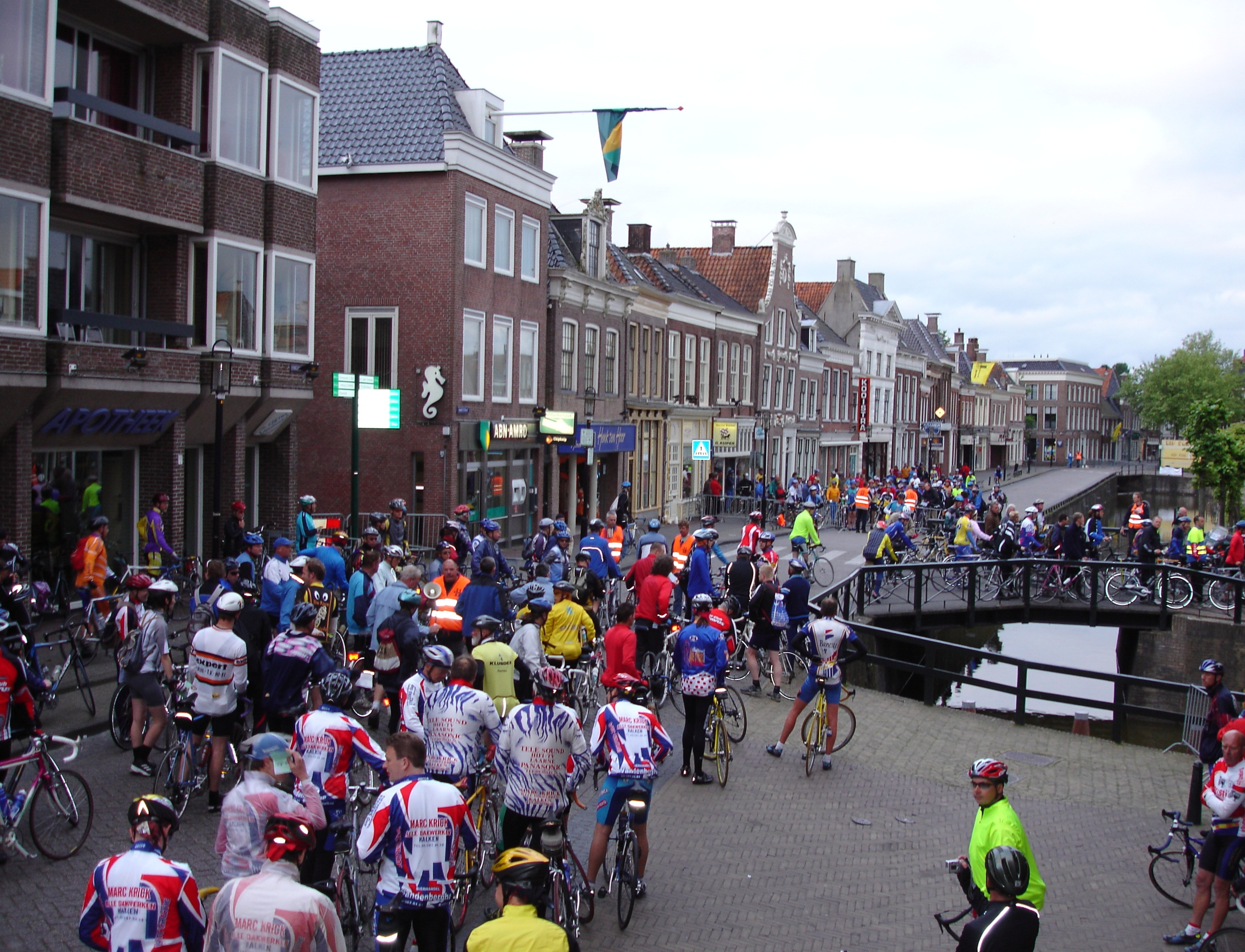
Departure of the Elfstedentocht cycling tour in 2006

The Eleven Cities Cycling Tour (Dutch: Fietselfstedentocht, West Frisian: Alvestêdetocht op de fyts) was originally a bicycle race in Friesland, Netherlands. In recent years, due to the number of participants, it has become a bicycle tour. It is the cycling counterpart of the Elfstedentocht ice-skating tour which is held irregularly on frozen waterways in the same region. The event attracts annually more than 15,000 participants and is considered one of the best cycle tours in the Netherlands.

== History ==
Due to the popularity of the Eleven Cities Skating tour, a similar tour was hosted for cyclists in the beginning of the 20th century. In 1912 the first cycling tour was organised. It started out as a competition, and was organised when the skating counterpart wasn't organised due to the weather. Since 1947, the tour has been organised annually on Whit Monday, a Dutch Bank holiday. Although the tour started out as a race, from 1958 it was hosted as a tour in order to prevent serious injuries. Due to popular interest by non-professional cyclist, and the sometimes less-ideal conditions of the road, it was considered to be too dangerous to race. To prevent enthusiasts from racing anyway, participants are to keep in mind a maximum average speed of 25 km/h between check points.

== Route ==
The cycling tour's route differs from its counterpart on skates: the cycling tour starts and ends in Bolsward rather than in Leeuwarden. The tour takes the participants through the eleven ancient cities of the province of Frisia. The tour is currently limited to 15,000 entrants. Between 05:00 and 08:00, entrants leave Bolsward every eight minutes in batches of 600 participants. Those who complete the 235 km tour before midnight are entitled to a medal.

== Types of bicycles ==
While most participants use a racing bicycle, other types of bikes can be seen as well. A small percentage participates on tandem bicycles, European city bicycles both with and without gears, rowing cycles and handcycles. Even penny-farthings have been used for the tour.
