= Water gate =

Fortified gate from a castle or town wall to a quay, river side, or harbour

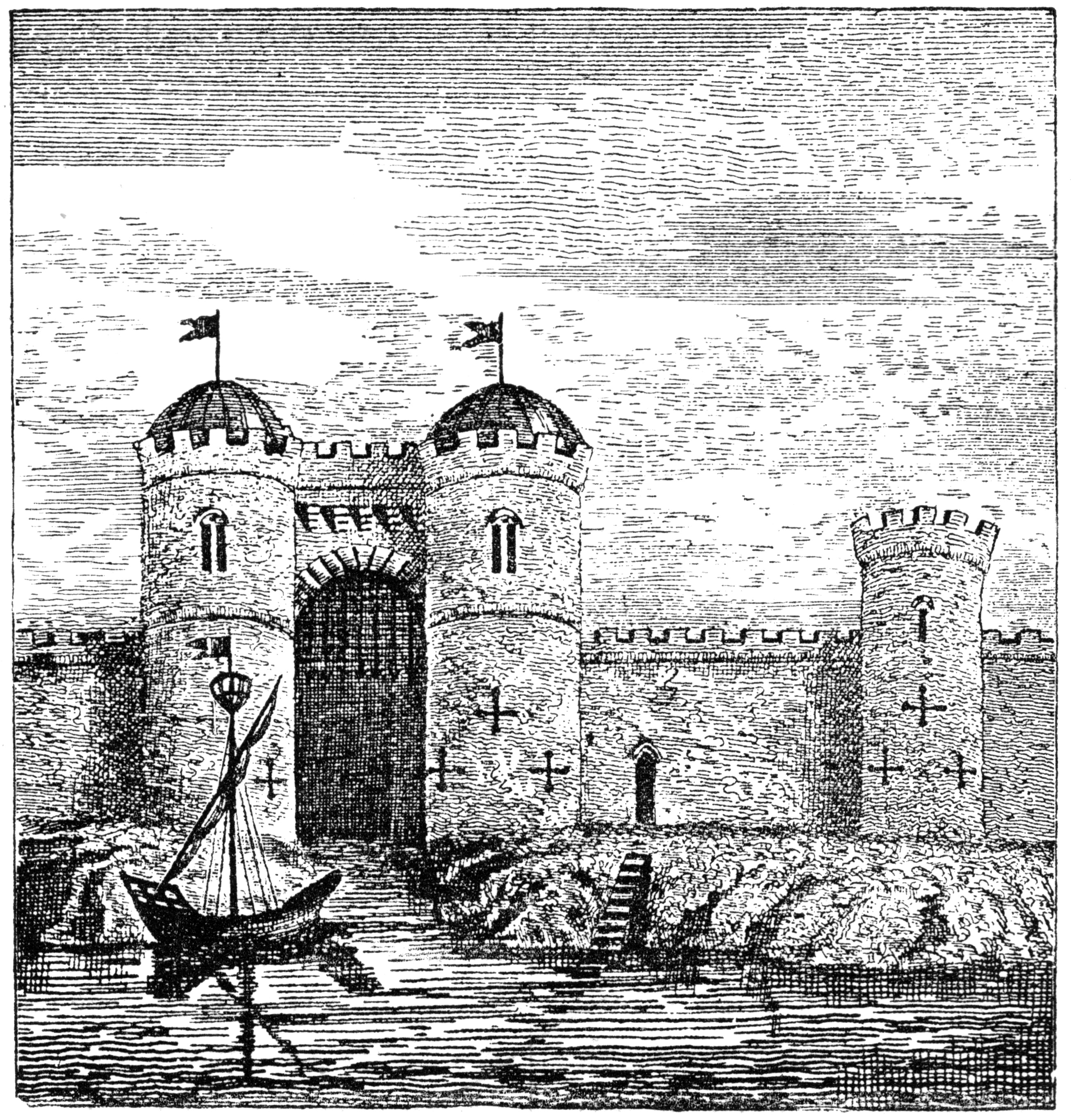
A 19th-century image of the long-demolished Water Gate at Bristol Castle, England

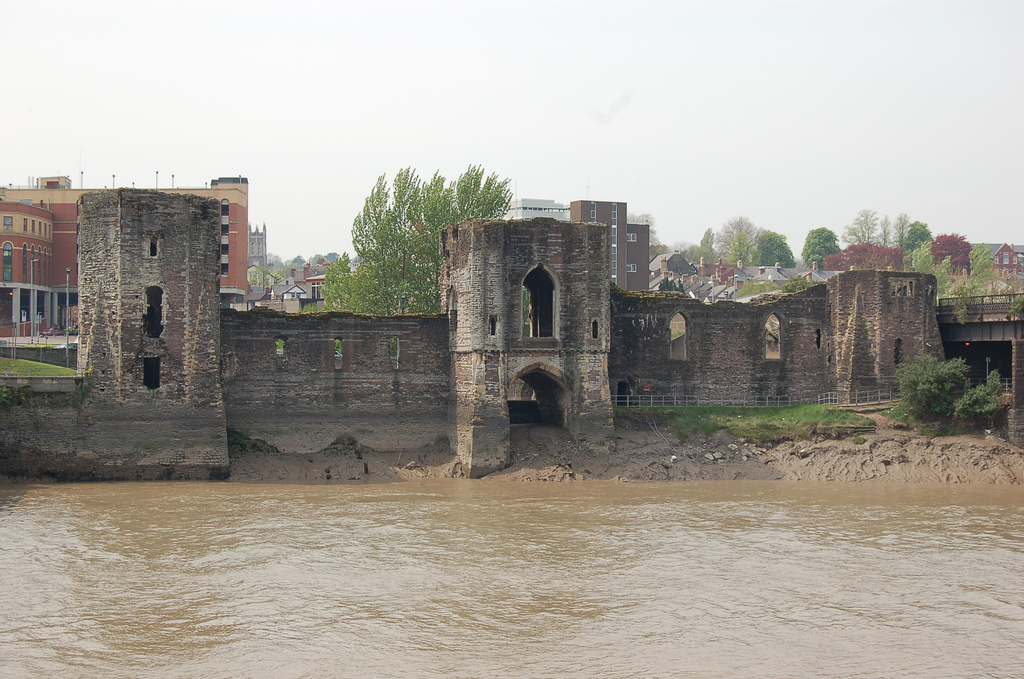
Newport Castle in Wales, showing a 14th-century watergate directly beneath the central tower, allowing access to and from the tidal River Usk

A water gate (or watergate) is a fortified gate, leading directly from a castle or town wall directly on to a quay, river side or harbour. In medieval times it enabled people and supplies to reach the castle or fortification directly from the water, and equally allowed those within the castle direct access to water transport.

Water gates were often integral to the defense strategies of medieval castles, as they allowed for the control of waterways and facilitated the movement of troops and supplies during sieges.

== Examples ==
- The Waterpoort, known as the symbol of Sneek
- Bristol Castle
- Newport Castle
- Southampton Castle
- The Traitors' Gate at the Tower of London

== See also ==
- Irrigation gate
- Moat
