= Waterpoort =

Water gate in Sneek, The Netherlands

Coordinates: 53°1′45″N 5°39′33″E

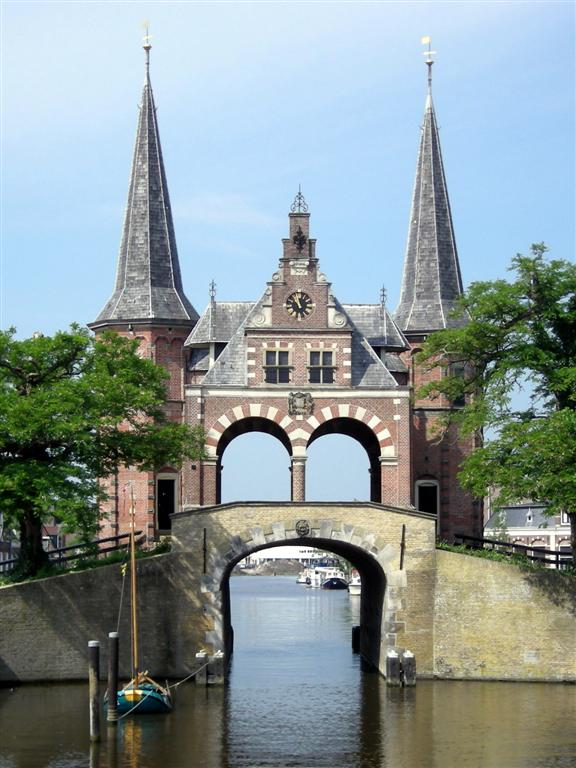
Waterpoort in Sneek

The Waterpoort or Hoogendster Pijp is a water gate, a gate in a defensive wall that connects a city to a waterway. It is situated in Sneek, the Netherlands.

In the 15th and 16th century, a defensive wall had been built around Sneek. The city lay on the important trade route between Leeuwarden and Stavoren, from which the rich western parts of the Netherlands (now North Holland and South Holland) could be reached. To facilitate this trade, a new harbour called the "Kolk" was built to the southwest of the city and in 1613 the Waterpoort was erected to connect city and harbour. It formed part of the city walls, but when large parts of these were demolished in the early 18th century, it was decided to leave the Waterpoort intact.

The style of the gate, now the symbol of Sneek, can be described as Manierist. It is unclear who designed it, but names suggested include those of Thomas Berentsz. and Jacob Lous. Above the gate itself, which originally would have had wooden fences, is a loggia (gallery) and above that are what were the quarters of the gatekeeper. On each side is an octagonal tower. It is listed as a Rijksmonument, number 34075.

== See also ==
- Brama Młyńska (Mill Gate), another surviving medieval watergate.
