= Storming of Stargard =

1659 capture of Stargard by Swedish forces

- Part of the Second Northern War
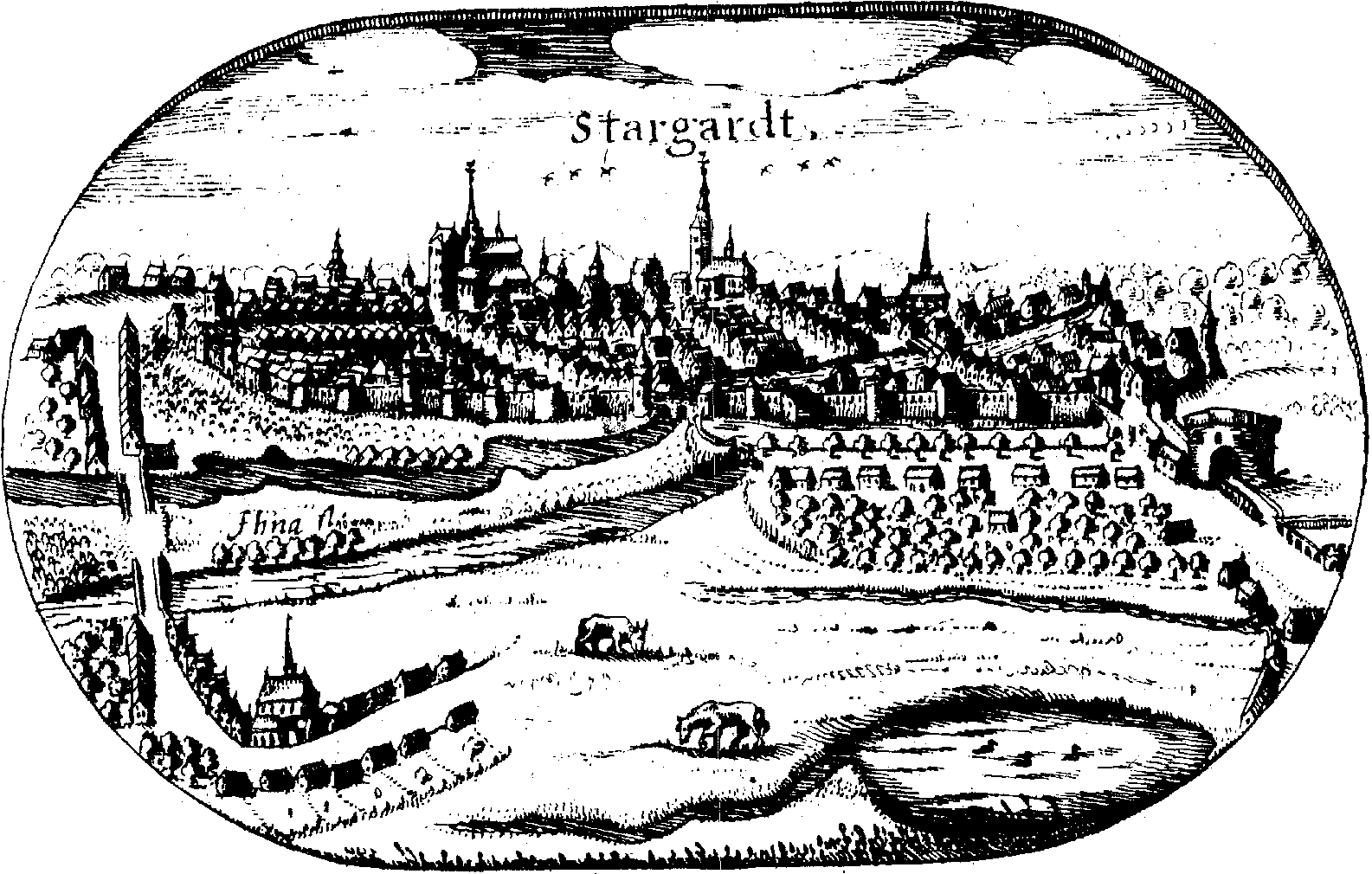
- View of Stargard by Johann Wolfart from 1614
| Date | 7–8 May 1659 |
| Location | Stargard, West Pomeranian Voivodeship 53°20′N 15°2′E |
| Result | Swedish victory |
| Territorial changes | Stargard is captured by Swedish forces |

Belligerents
| (yes) Swedish Empire | Brandenburg |

Commanders and leaders
| (yes) Barthold Hartwig von Bülow (yes) von Bornsdorff (yes) Kurck | Unknown Lieutenant (POW) |

Units involved
| Unknown | Stargard garrison |

Strength
| 2,000–2,600 men | Unknown |

Casualties and losses
| Unknown | 25 captured |

The storming of Stargard occurred from 7 to 8 May 1659 during the Second Northern War. On 6 May, a Swedish force of 2,000–2,600 men under the command of Generalmajor Barthold Hartwig von Bülow was ordered to capture Stargard. The Swedes arrived on 7 May, quickly taking the defenders by surprise. The city was captured on 8 May, and Bülow returned to Dirschau with supplies and prisoners.

== Background ==
In early May 1659, Adolph John sent a force of 2,000 or 2,600 men under the command of Generalmajor Barthold Hartwig von Bülow to capture the city of Stargard.

== Storming ==
On 6 May, the force left for Stargard, arriving there on the day after. Bülow sent his cavalry to block the roads into the city, moving his infantry and dragoons into the Pelplin cathedral. He divided the force into two groups. One under a certain Kurck, who would command the infantry and storm the southern gate. Another, under the command of Överste von Bornsdorff, would consist of the dragoons to storm the eastern gate.

When the storming was initiated, the defenders were taken by complete surprise. According to Kurck, it went like this:

It was such a good outlet that we, without the enemy's resistance or alerting our posts, climbed over them and surprised them, so that those who were in the greatest safety in the corps de garde, outside the door, knew nothing until I was right on top of them. The sentries up in the tower and down in the Zwinger made no sound until I had already taken control of the posts, captured the sentries, and had a lieutenant and 24 soldiers at the gate as prisoners. Then, after blowing open the gate with petards, we stormed into the city and took the main guard. There was some resistance, but by then it was too late and the city was lost. The captain and the guards who had remained in the square requested to be quartered, and I took them to the corps de garde until everything was secure. Meanwhile, Colonel Bornsdorff also entered safely, finding the commander and his wife still in bed, unafraid of any enemy, comfortably and securely. Thus, the city of Stargard was stormed and taken at night

== Aftermath ==
On May 8, the city was finally captured. However, the Swedish camp was soon attacked by the Brandenburgers, which forced the Swedes to withdraw into Elbing. Returning from Stargard to Dirschau, Bülow took with him prisoners and supplies, and a Swedish garrison was established in the city.

== See also ==
- Siege of Wolin – 1659 Austrian victory in the Second Northern War
- Siege of Stettin (1659) – Siege in 1659 during the Second Northern War of 1655–1660

== Works cited ==
- Barkman, Bertil C:son; Lundkvist, Sven; Tersmeden, Lars (1966). Kungl. Svea livgardes historia: 1632(1611)-1660 [History of the Royal Swedish Life Guards: 1632(1611)-1660] (in Swedish). Vol. 3:2. Stockholm: Stift. för Svea livgardes historia.
- Mankell, J. (1865). Uppgifter rörande Svenska Krigsmagtens styrka, sammansättning och fördelning sedan slutet af femtonhundratalet [Information regarding the Swedish Armed Forces Strength, Composition and Distribution since the end of the 16th century] (in Swedish). C.M. Thimgren.
- Munthe, Ludvig W:son (1906). Fortifikationsstaten under Örnehufwudh och Wärnschiöld 1641–1674 [The Fortification State under Örnehufwudh and Wärnschiöld 1641–1674]. Kongl. Fortifikationens Historia (in Swedish). Vol. 2. Stockholm: P.A. Norstedt & Söner.
- Hedberg, Jonas (1982). Carl X Gustafs tid [Time of Charles X Gustav]. Kungl. Artilleriet (in Swedish). Stockholm: Militärhistoriska förlaget. ISBN 9185266191.
