= Stargard =

City in Poland

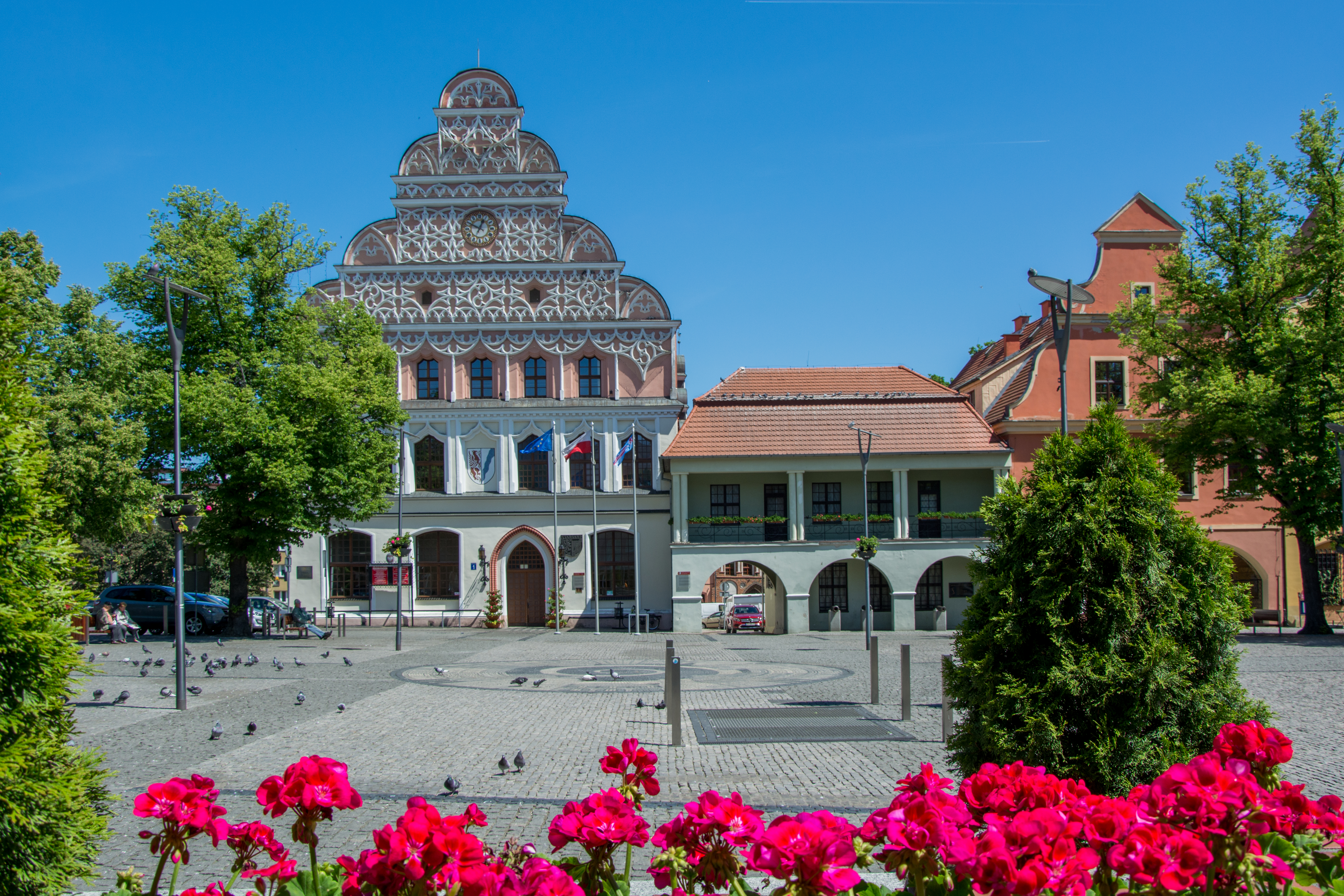
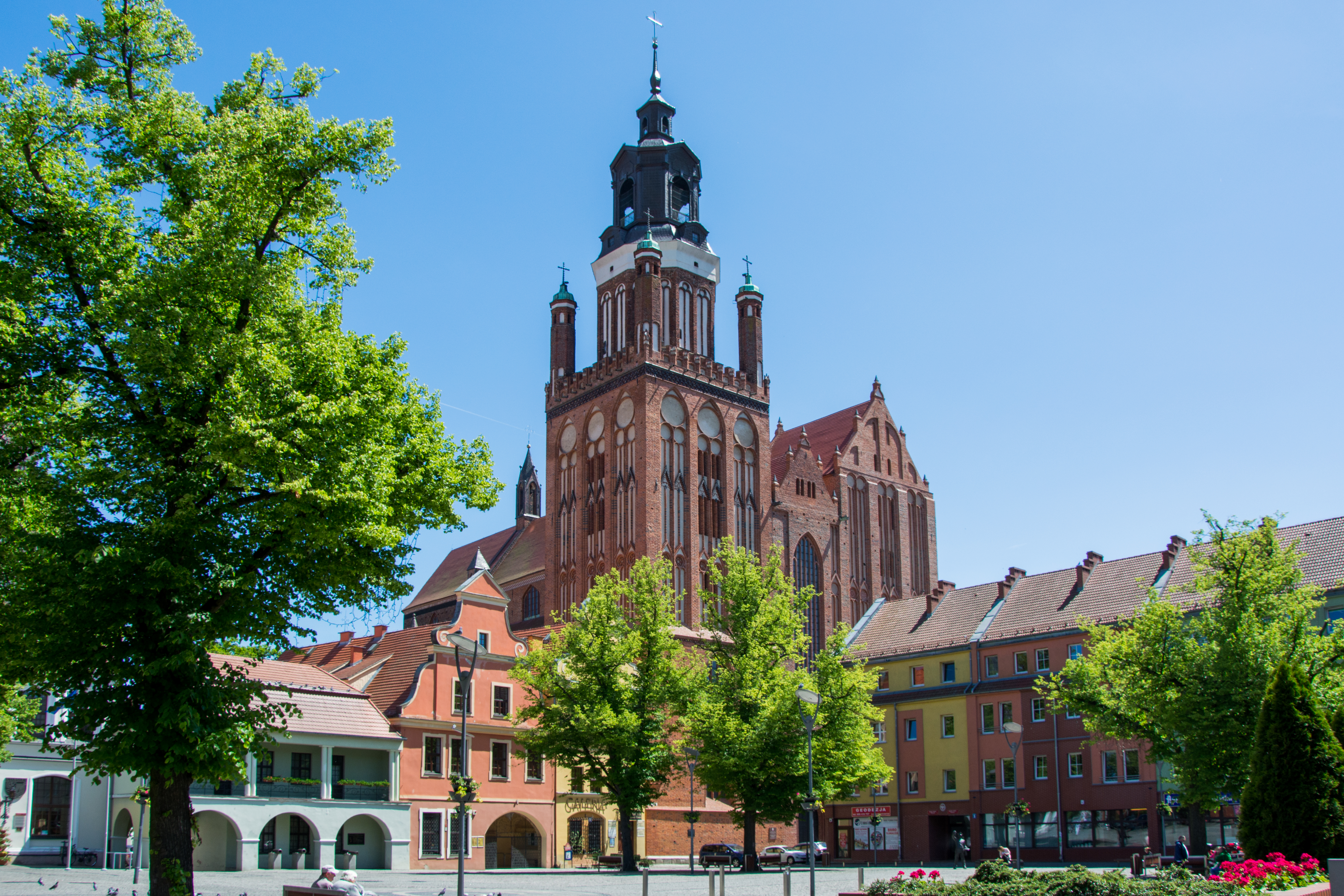
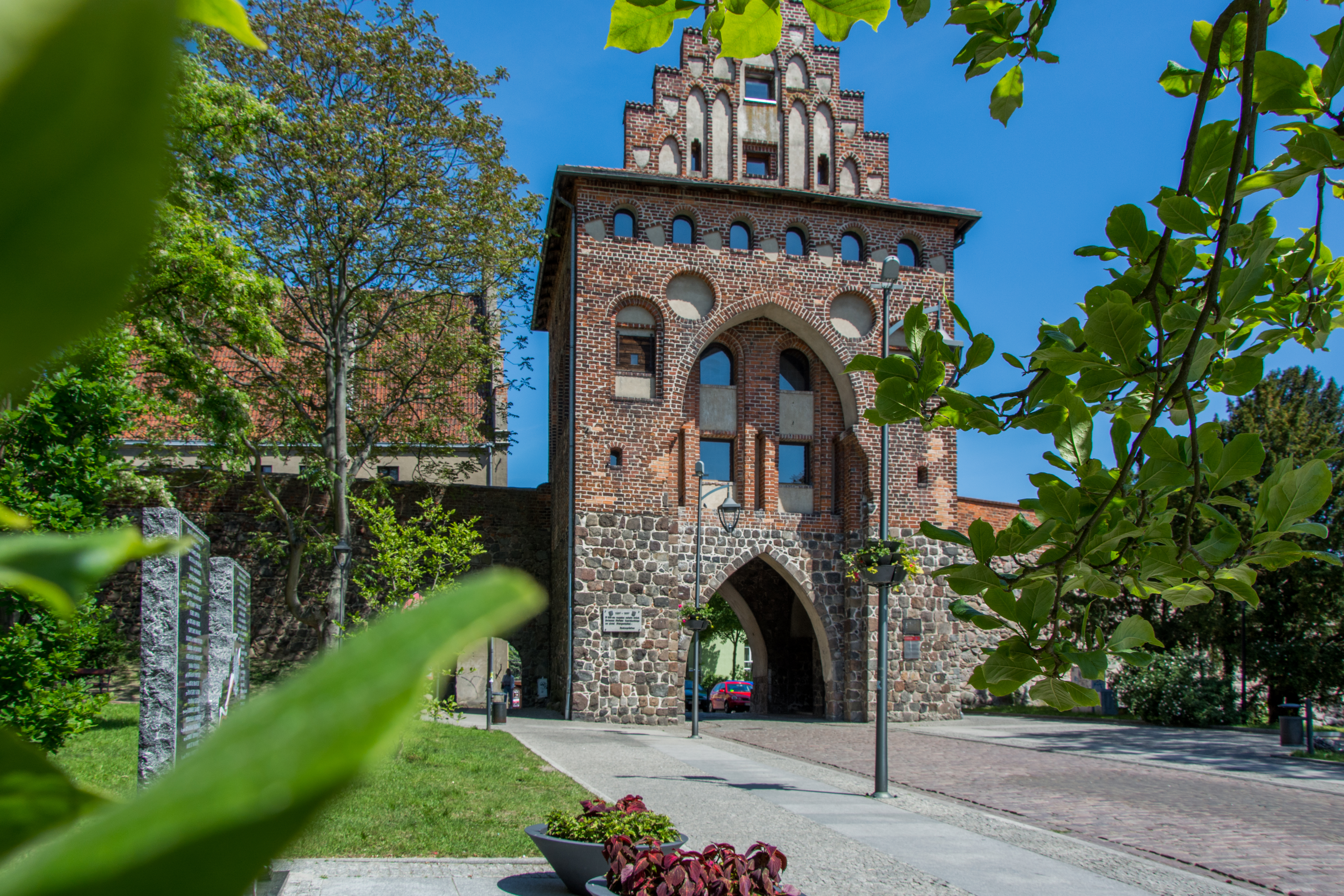
- City Hall St. Mary's Church Pyrzyce Gate

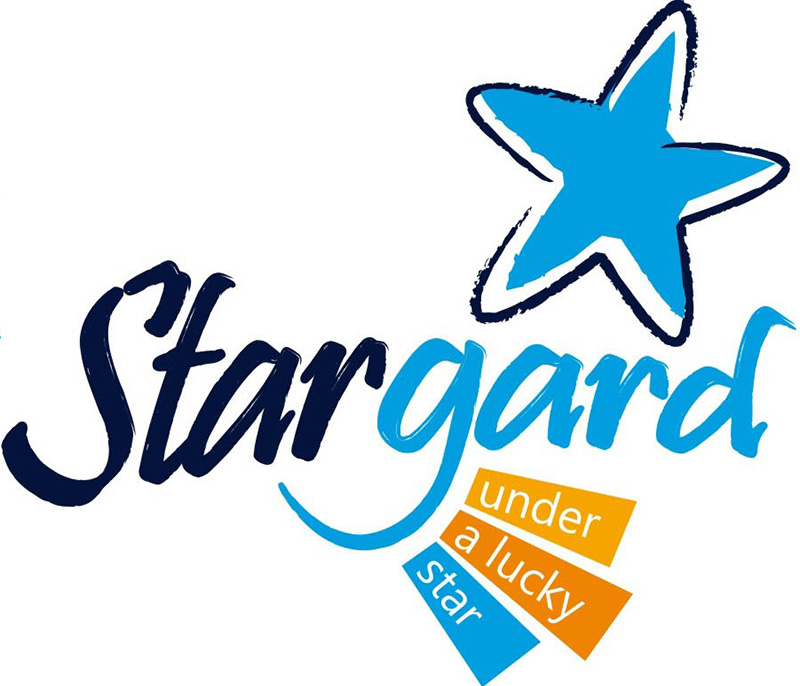
- Flag Coat of arms Brandmark
- Motto: Stargard - Klejnot Pomorza; Stargard - Jewel of Pomerania
- Location within Poland
- Coordinates: 53°20′N 15°2′E
- Country: Poland
- Voivodeship: West Pomeranian Voivodeship
- County: Stargard
- Gmina: Stargard (urban gmina)
- Established: 8th century
- First mentioned: 1124
- City rights: 1243

Government
  - City mayor: Rafał Zając (KO)

Area
  - Total: 48.1 km^{2} (18.6 sq mi)
- Elevation: 20 m (66 ft)

Population (31 December 2021)
  - Total: 67,293 ▼
  - Density: 1,400/km^{2} (3,620/sq mi)
- Time zone: UTC+1 (CET)
  - Summer (DST): UTC+2 (CEST)
- Postal code: 73-100 to 73-110
- Area code: +48 91
- Car plates: ZST
- Website: http://www.stargard.pl

Stargard ([ˈstarɡart]; 1945: Starogród, 1950–2016: Stargard Szczeciński; German: Stargard in Pommern or Stargard an der Ihna; Kashubian: Stôrgard) is a city in northwestern Poland, located in the West Pomeranian Voivodeship. In 2021 it was inhabited by 67,293 people. It is situated on the Ina River. The city is the seat of the Stargard County, and, extraterritorially, of the municipality of Stargard. It is the second biggest city of Szczecin agglomeration.

Founded in the 8th century, Stargard is one of the oldest cities in Poland. It owed its centuries-long prosperity to trade and crafts, and from 1377 to 1478 it was the capital of a small eponymous principality ruled by the House of Griffin. It became more internationally known only in the 20th century, for being the location of large German-operated prisoner-of-war camps for tens of thousands of Allied soldiers of various nationalities during each of the world wars. The city contains several notable medieval Gothic landmarks, chiefly the St. Mary's Church and defensive walls with several gates and towers, listed as Historic Monuments of Poland, and an international military cemetery from both world wars. Stargard is the location of a Polish Army garrison and a major railroad junction, where the southwards connection from Szczecin splits into two directions: towards Poznań and Gdańsk.

== Etymology ==
The name Stargard is clearly of Slavic origin and represents a form characteristic of the Pomeranian dialect for the name "old stronghold" (or "old fortified town"), which appears in various forms across all Slavic lands, stary is the Slavic/Polish word meaning old, and gard town, stronghold. The first word of the toponym staro is the Slavic word meaning „old”, element „gard” simply means "town" or "stronghold," and in this form it has survived to this day in the Pomeranian regions and can also be seen in other place names in the region and according to this style of naming place names, the newer towns called Nowogard where nowo means new and gard town, strobghold, are a common in Poland and other Slavic lands. This name and its many varianrs is common in all Slavic lands and the style of calling places with adjective „old” and „new” is seen many other place names across Poland.

The name of the town was first mentioned in 1124, when the chronicler Ebbo, describing the mission of St. Otto of Bamberg, noted his stay at the stronghold of Castro Zitarigroda. The next record dates from 1140, when Castro Stargrod was listed in a papal bull by Pope Innocent II as a stronghold that was henceforth to belong to the Bishopric of Wolin, other variants and spellings in this area are Stargard, Starogard, ‘starogród’.

== History ==
=== Middle Ages ===
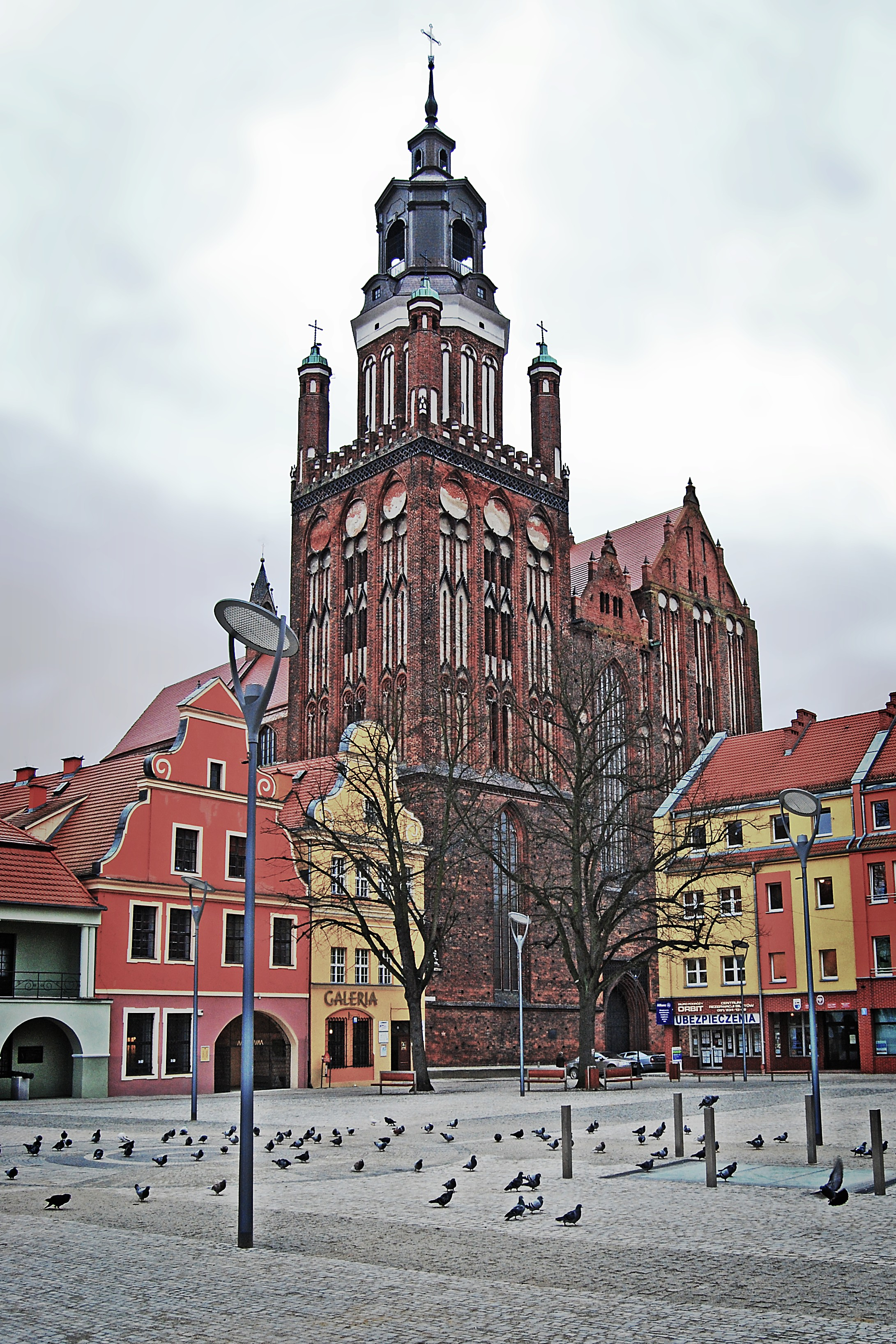
St. Mary's Church, a Gothic architecture masterpiece and Historic Monument of Poland

The settlement was founded in the 8th century at the site of the present-day district of Osetno near downtown Stargard. In 967 it became part of the emerging Polish state under the first Polish rulers from the Piast dynasty. Stargard was first mentioned in 1124, when it was part of Poland under Bolesław III Wrymouth. A church was founded in 1140. Stargard received Magdeburg city rights in 1243 from Barnim I, Duke of Pomerania.

It was one of the most important towns and a major trade centre of the Duchy of Pomerania, after it split off from Poland as a result of the 12th-century fragmentation of Poland. From 1283, the city had a port at the mouth of the Ina River in the nowadays abandoned village of Inoujście. Defensive city walls were built in the 13th century and expanded in the 14th, 15th and early 16th centuries. In 1363 the city joined the Hanseatic League.

As a result of the ongoing fragmentation of Pomerania, in 1368 Stargard became part of the Duchy of Słupsk (Pomerania-Stolp) and in 1377 it became the capital of a separate eponymous duchy, which in 1403 fell back to Duchy of Słupsk, a vassal state of the Kingdom of Poland. In 1478 Stargard became part of the reunified Duchy of Pomerania.

In the meantime, the trade rivalry with the nearby city of Stettin led to the outbreak of the Stettin–Stargard maritime trade war in 1454, which ended in 1464. In 1477 Stargard helped Duke Wartislaw X recapture the town of Gartz during a Brandenburgian invasion.

=== Modern period ===
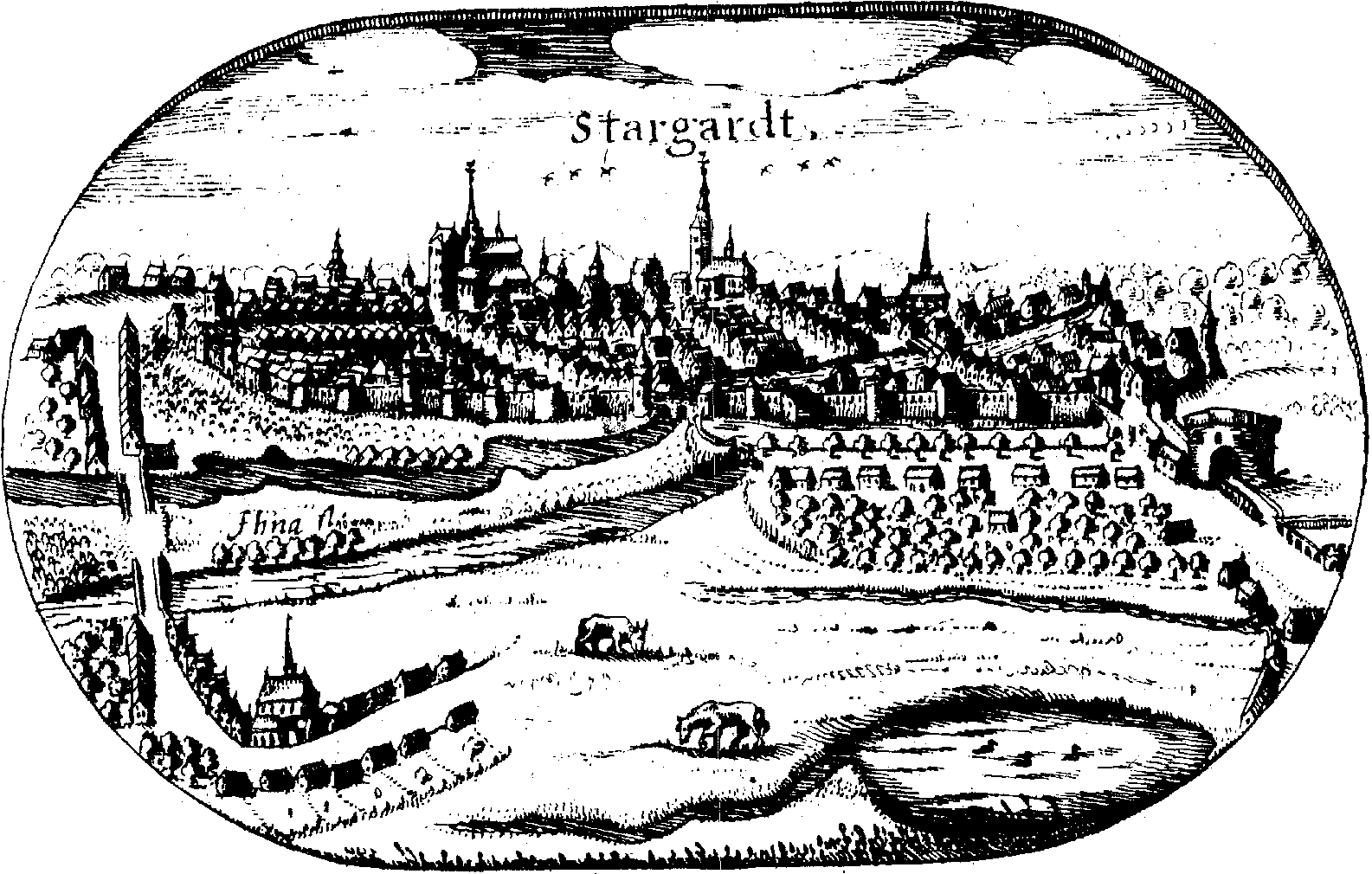
Stargard in the 17th century

Stargard was part of the Duchy of Pomerania until its dissolution after the death of the last duke Bogislaw XIV in 1637. During the Thirty Years' War the city was captured by Sweden in 1630. It was besieged by the troops of the Holy Roman Empire in 1635, and in order to hamper the attacks the Swedish commander set fire to the suburbs, causing a city fire, however, it was still captured by imperial troops. In 1636 it was recaptured by the Swedes, then it was taken and plundered by Imperial troops to fall back to the Swedes again after the Battle of Wittstock. In 1637 it was again captured by Imperial troops and then by Sweden. As a result of the war, the population decreased by about 75%.

In accordance to the 1648 Peace of Westphalia, in 1653 it was incorporated, together with the rest of Farther Pomerania, into Brandenburg-Prussia. In May 1659, a Swedish force of 2,000 men captured the city. A French Huguenot commune was founded in 1687 and consisted of 145 people in 1700. In 1701 Stargard became part of the Kingdom of Prussia and in 1818, after the Napoleonic Wars, Stargard became part of the new district Szadzko (then officially Saatzig) within the Province of Pomerania. During the Franco-Prussian War (1870–1871), the Prussians established a prisoner-of-war camp for French troops in the city.

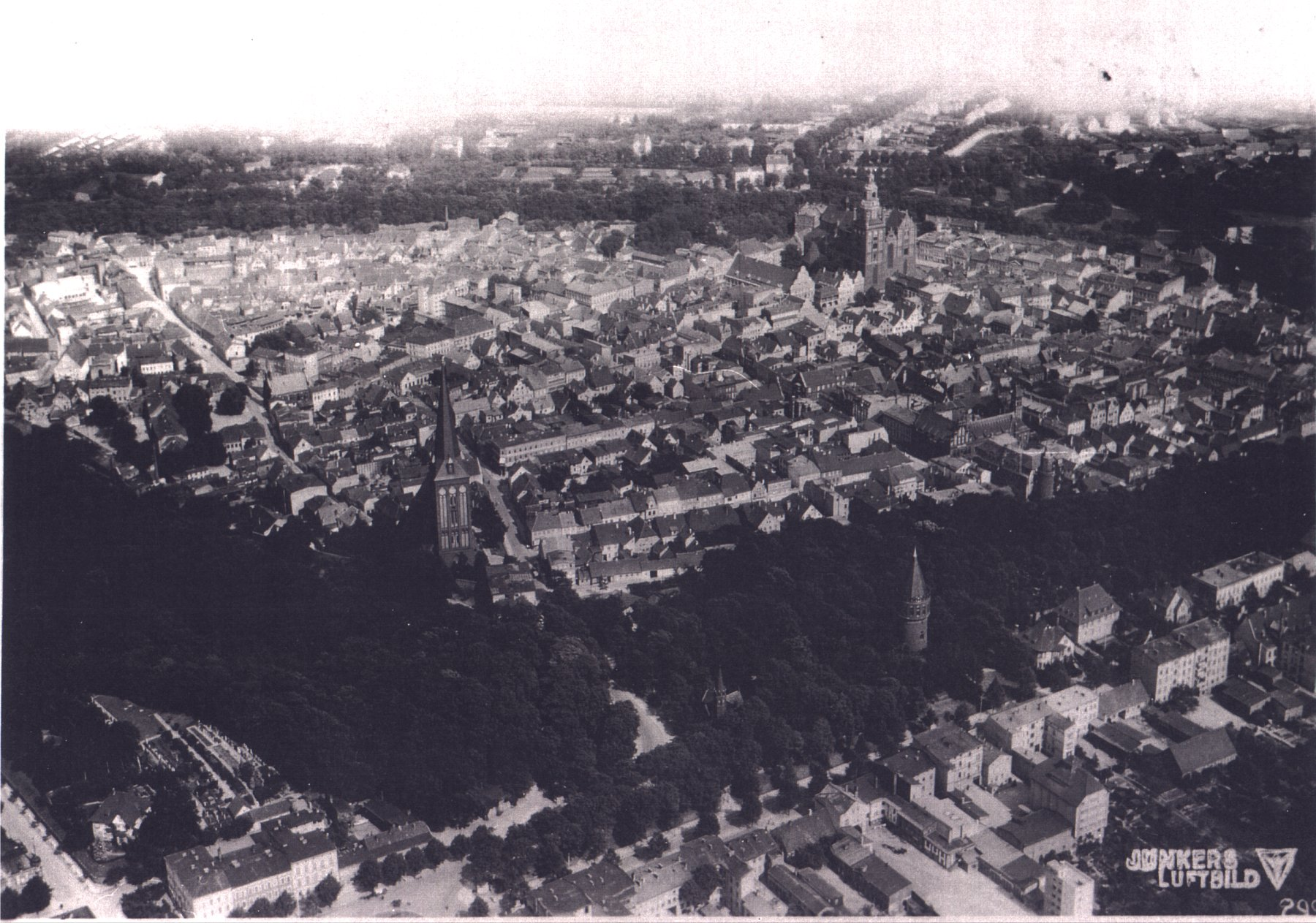
Aerial view in the 1930s

As a result of the unification of Germany in 1871 the city became part of the German Empire. On 1 April 1901 it became an independent city, separate from the Saatzig District. According to the Prussian census of 1905, Stargard had a population of 26,907, of which 97% were Germans and 3% were Poles. During World War I, the German administration operated a prisoner-of-war camp in Stargard, which housed in total some 50,000 POWs, including Russian (including ethnic Poles from the Russian Partition of Poland conscripted to the Tsarist army), French (including Algerians), Belgian, American, English, Serbian, Romanian, Portuguese, Italian and Japanese. In interwar Germany, the town was the site of a concentration camp for unwanted Jewish immigrants from Eastern Europe. The Stargarder Zeitung was as a local newspaper published in Stargard. In the March 1933 German federal election the Nazi Party received 58.7% of the vote in the city.

=== World War II ===
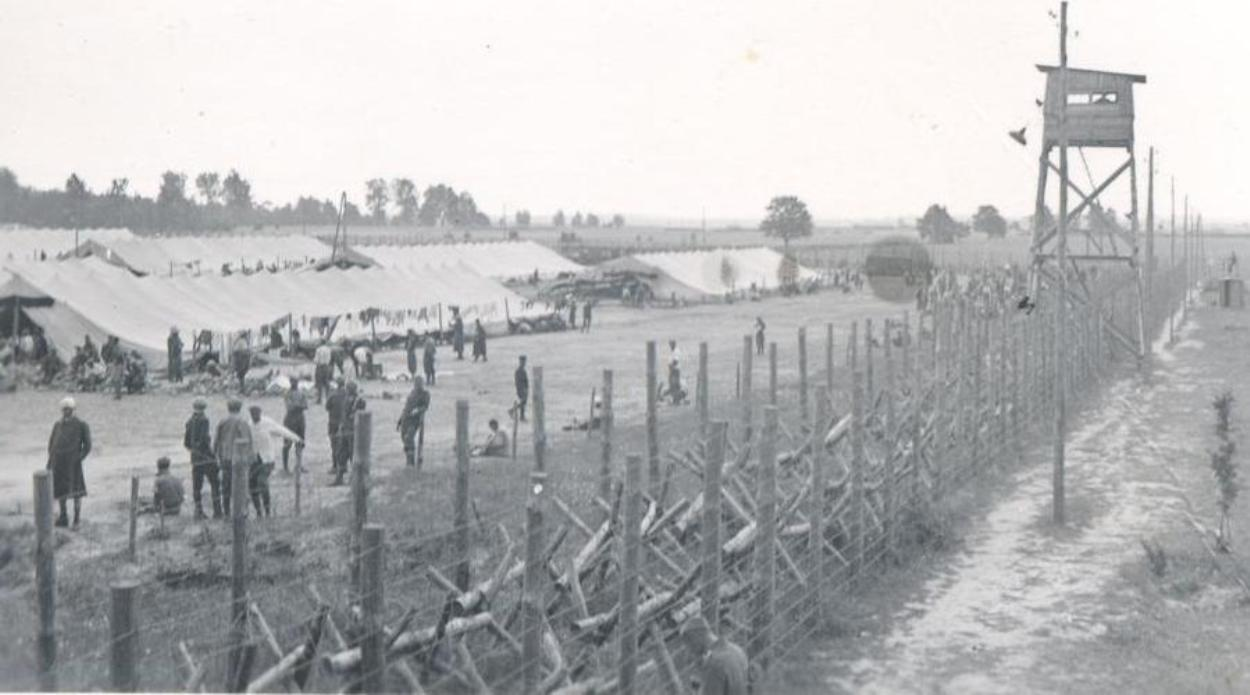
Stalag II-D

In 1939, during the German invasion of Poland, which started World War II, the Germans established the Dulag L temporary camp for Polish (including Kashubian) prisoners of war and civilians near Stargard, which in October 1939 was transformed into the large prisoner-of-war camp Stalag II-D. Then, after the battle of France in 1940, also the French, the Dutch and Belgians were held there, from 1941 also Yugoslavian and Soviet POWs, from 1942 also thousands of Canadians captured at Dieppe, one of whom was Gerald MacIntosh Johnston, a Canadian actor, who was killed trying to escape, and after 1943 also Italians. The POWs were subjected to racial segregation, and Poles, Africans, Arabs, Jews and Soviet troops were separated from POWs of other nationalities and subjected to worse treatment. Serbs also faced more severe treatment. Some 6,000 POWs and civilians died in the camp.

There were also two subcamps of the Ravensbrück concentration camp, one in Stargard and one in the present-day district of Kluczewo, as well as seven forced labour camps. The Polish resistance organized a district of the Union of Armed Struggle and Home Army in Stargard, under the cryptonym "Starka". Polish underground press was distributed in the city.

In February 1945, one of the last German armoured offensives, Operation Solstice, was launched from the Stargard area. The local population was evacuated by the Germans on the order of Heinrich Himmler before the approaching Soviets in the final stages of the war.

As a result of World War II the town again became part of Poland, under territorial changes demanded by the Soviet Union at the Potsdam Conference. Polish local administration was appointed on March 23, 1945. The town was repopulated by Poles, many of whom were displaced from former eastern Poland annexed by the Soviet Union.

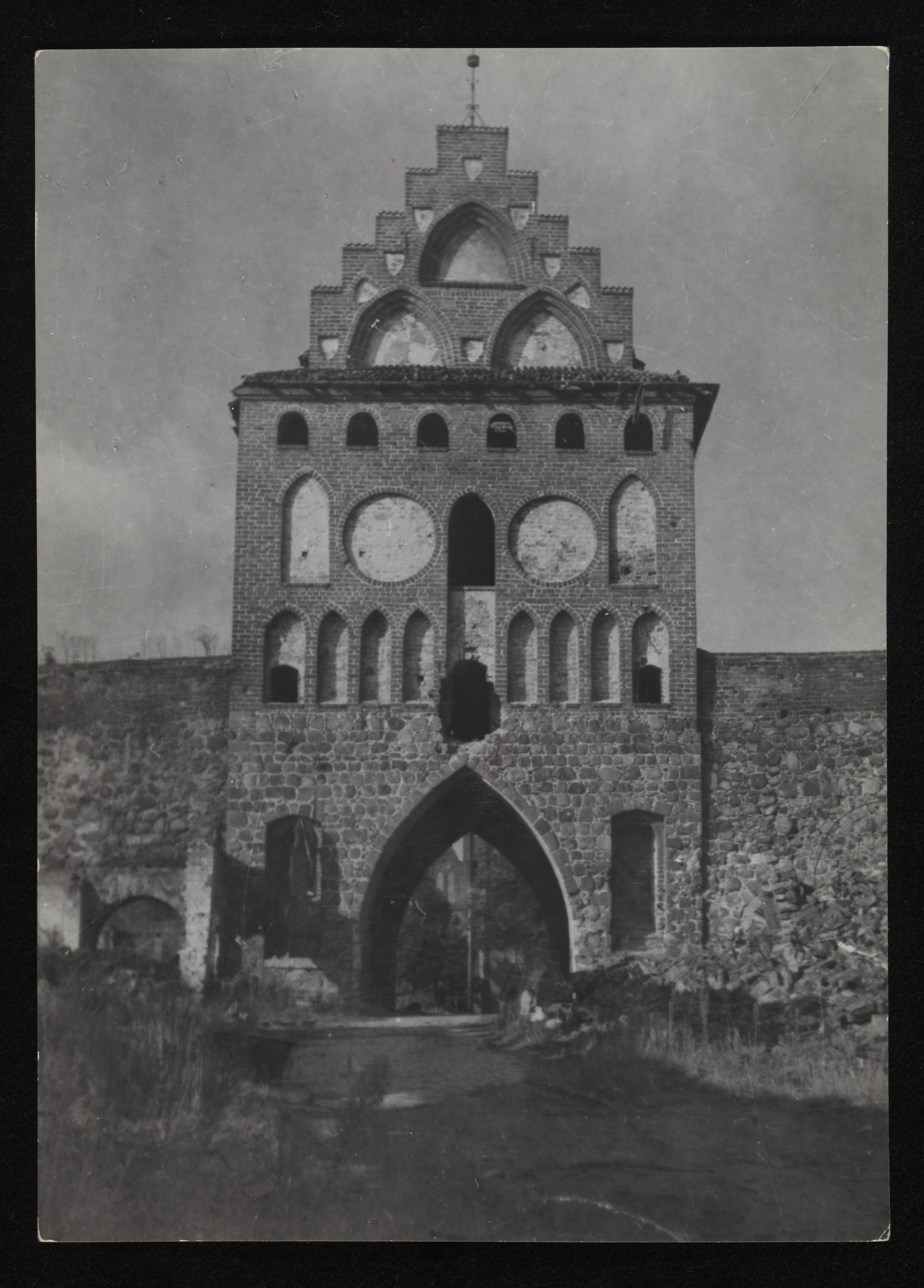
The Pyrzyce Gate in 1945

=== Post-war period ===
In 1950 the city was renamed Stargard Szczeciński by adding the adjective Szczeciński after the nearby city of Szczecin to distinguish it from Starogard Gdański in Gdańsk Pomerania. In 1961 the city limits were expanded by including the settlement of Kluczewo as a new district.

In 1979 the city suffered a flood.

In 1993 the city celebrated the 750th anniversary of receiving city rights.

In 2004 a north-western part of the town was made into an industrial park - Stargardzki Park Przemysłowy. Another industrial park is located in the south - Park Przemysłowy Wysokich Technologii.

On January 1, 2016, the town was renamed back to Stargard.

== Landmarks and monuments ==
Sights of Stargard

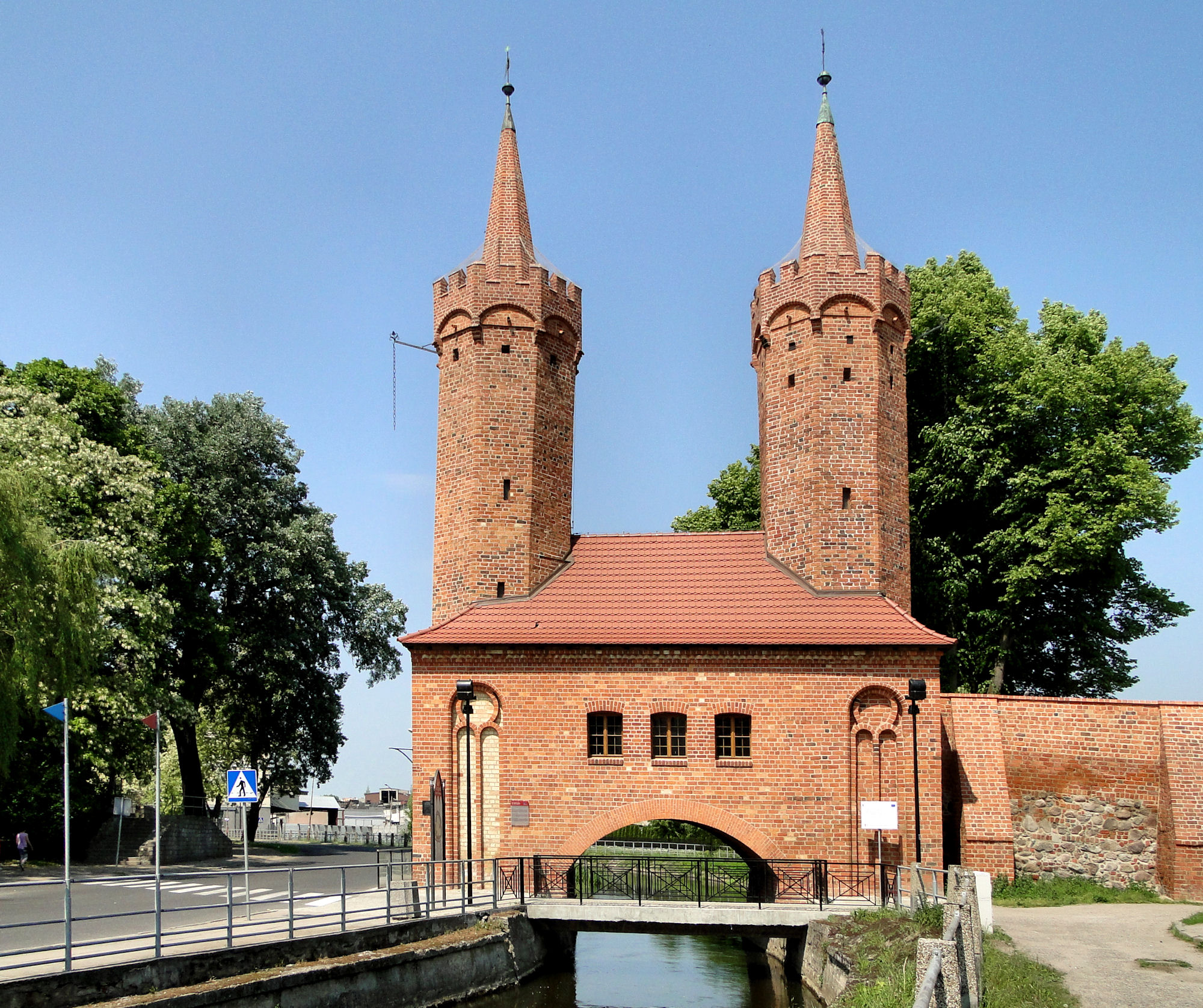
Brama Młyńska

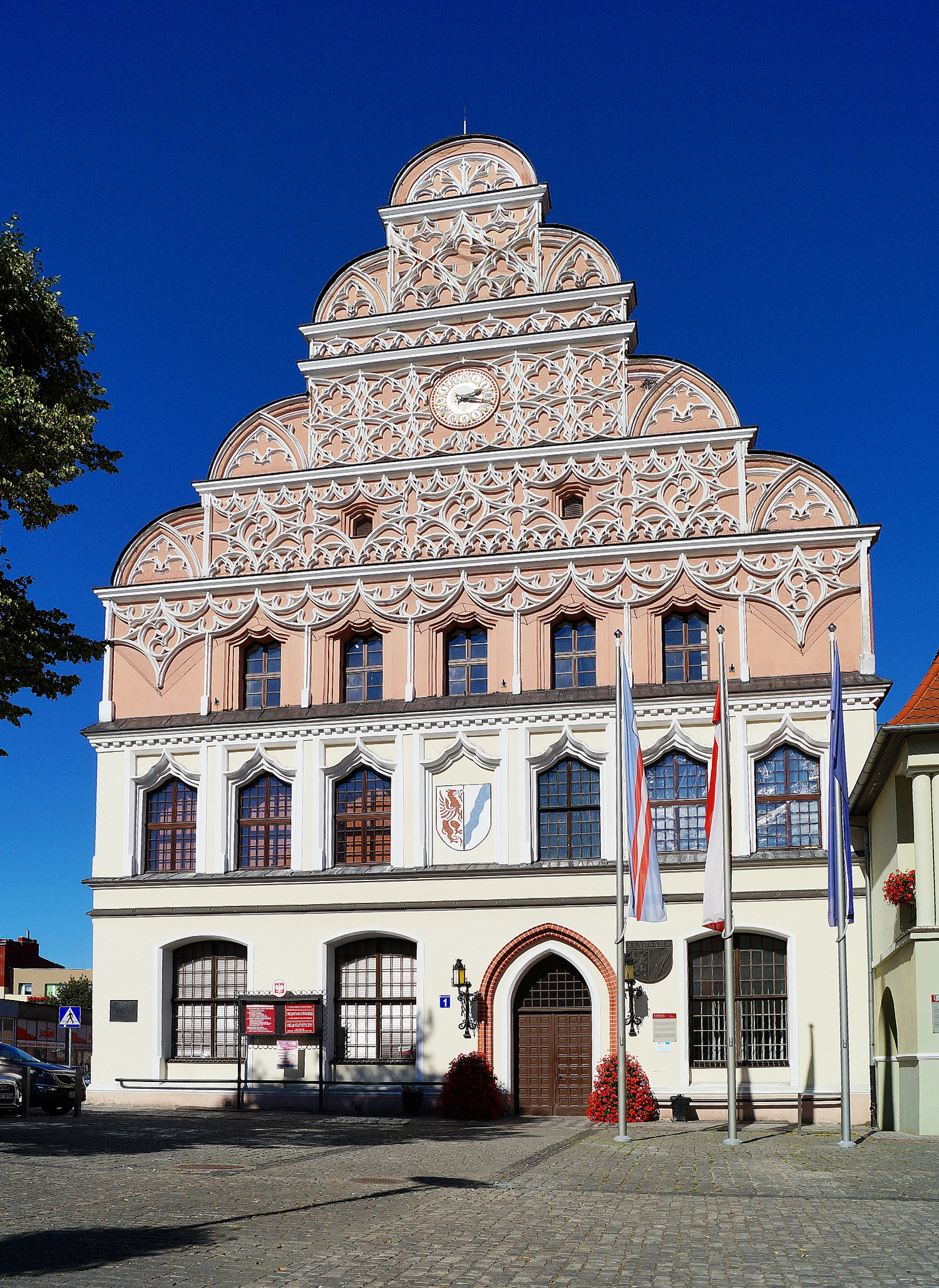
Renaissance Town Hall

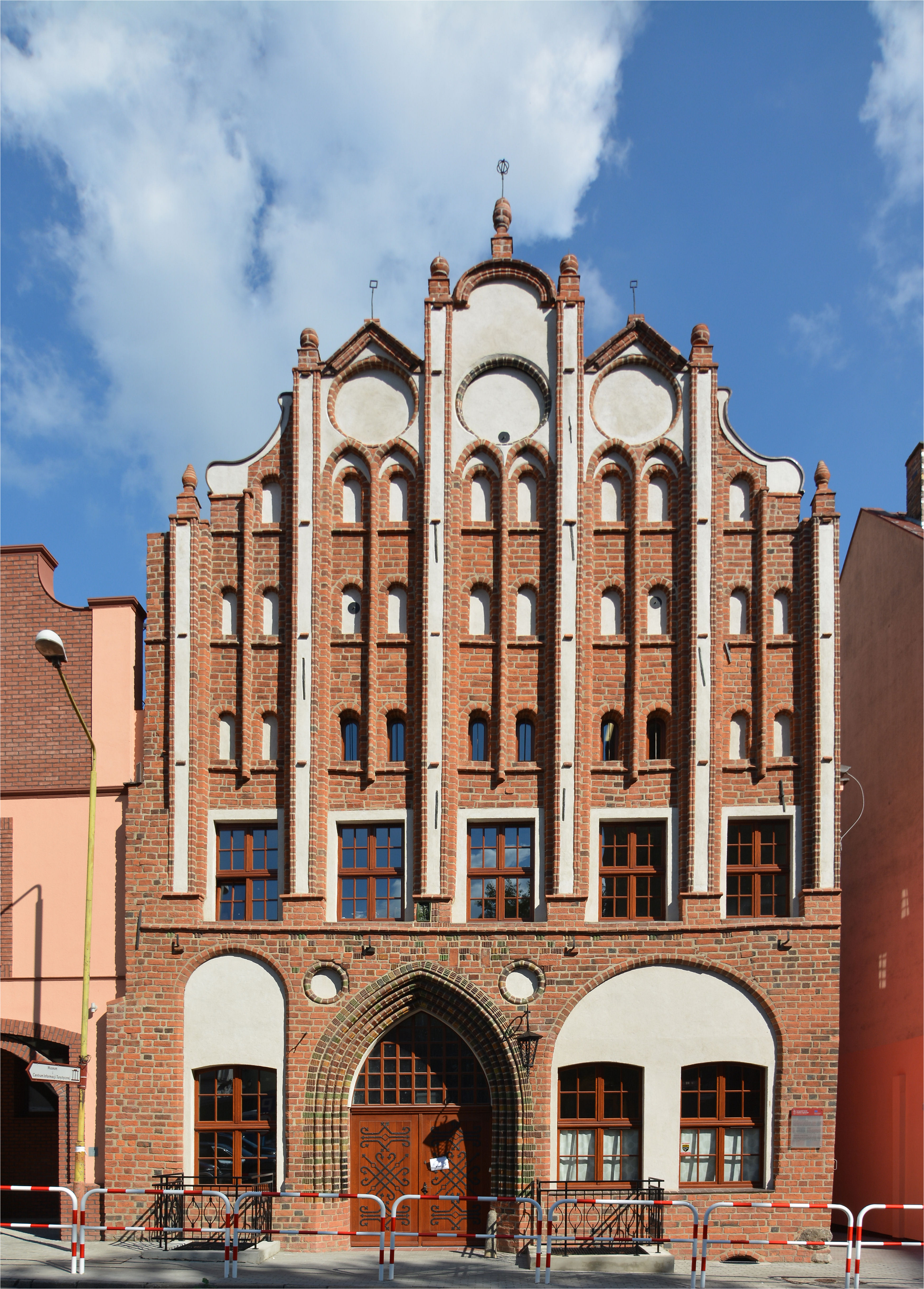
A Gothic townhouse, today a music school

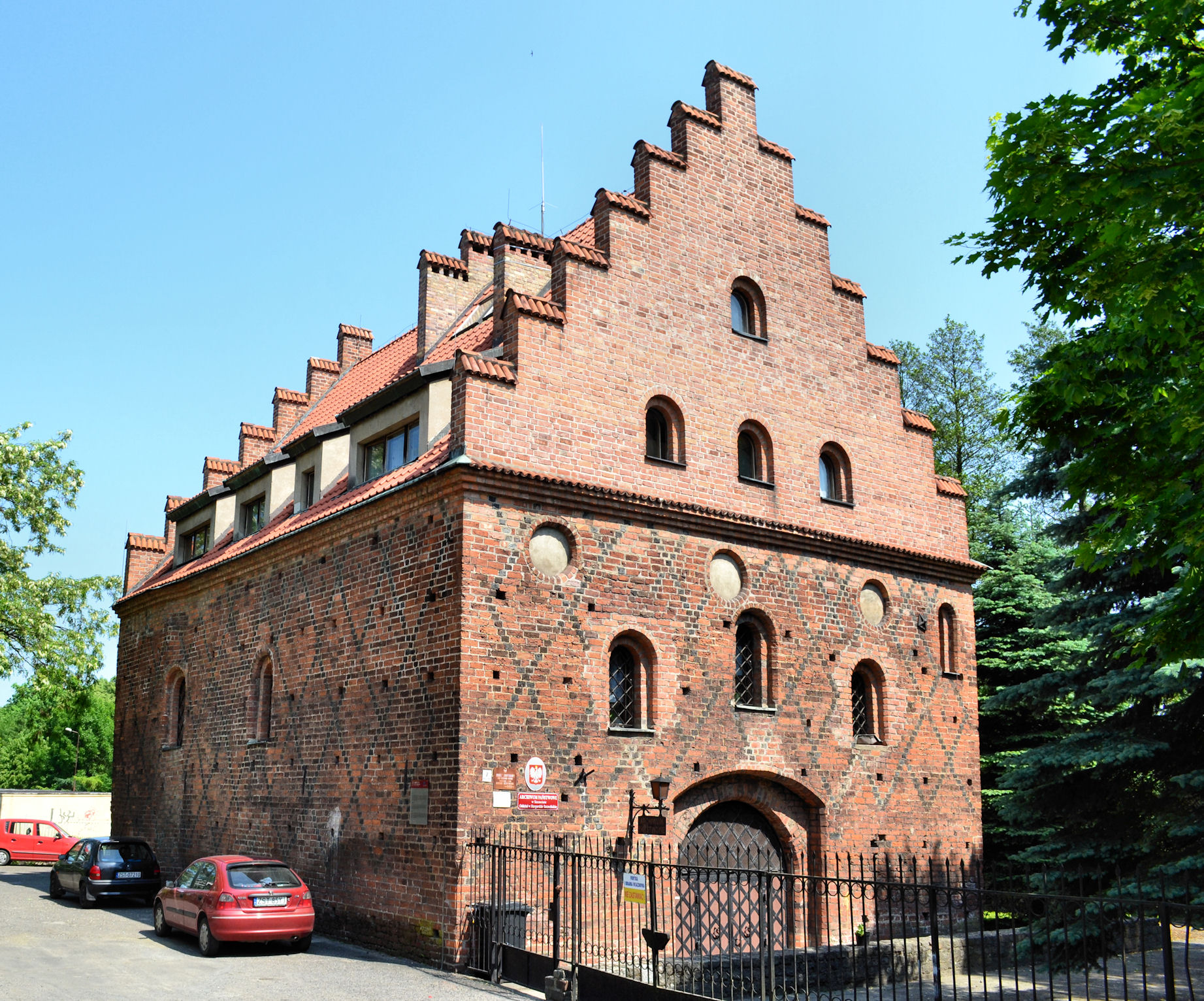
Arsenal

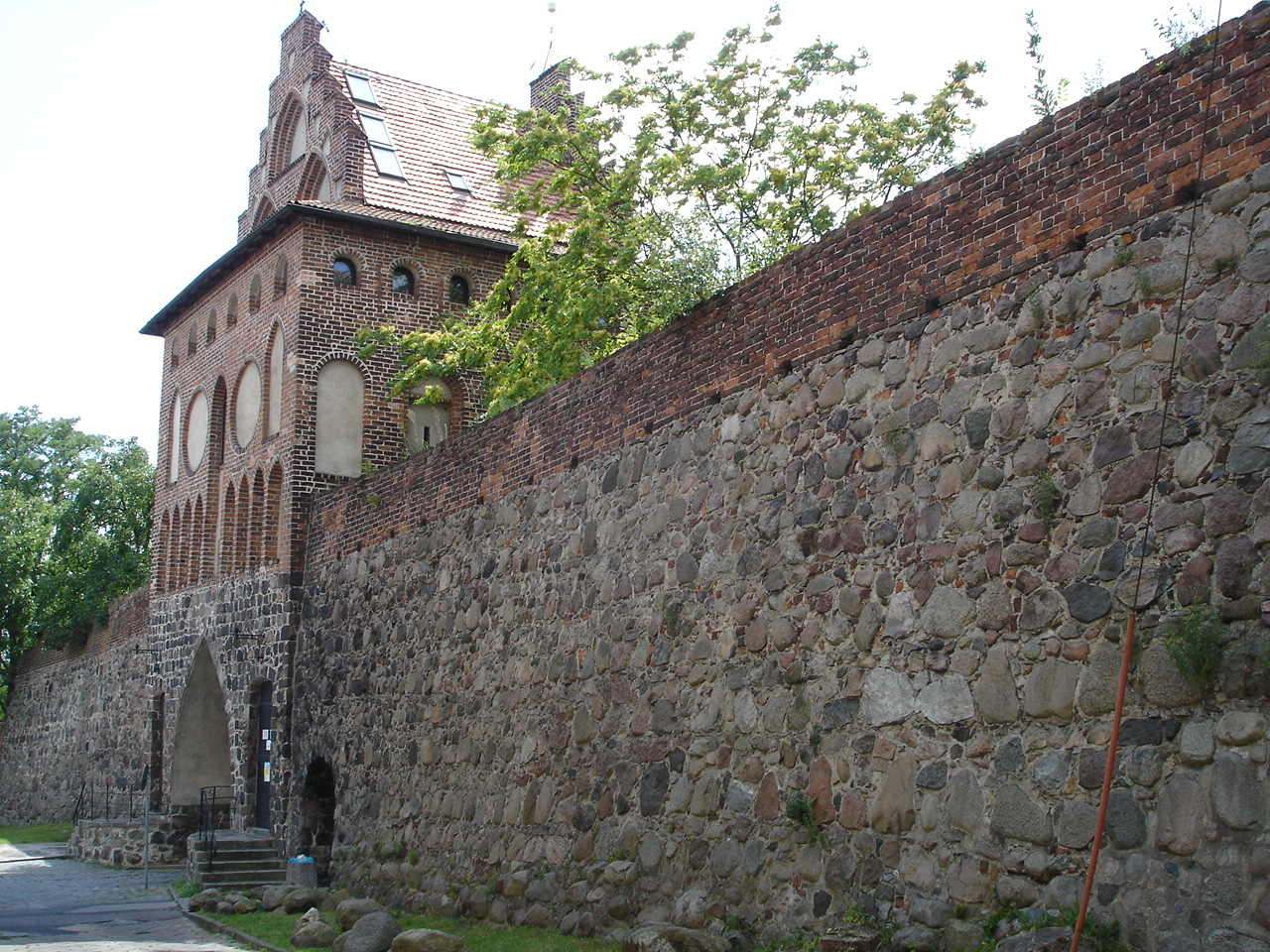
Medieval town walls with the Pyrzycka Gate

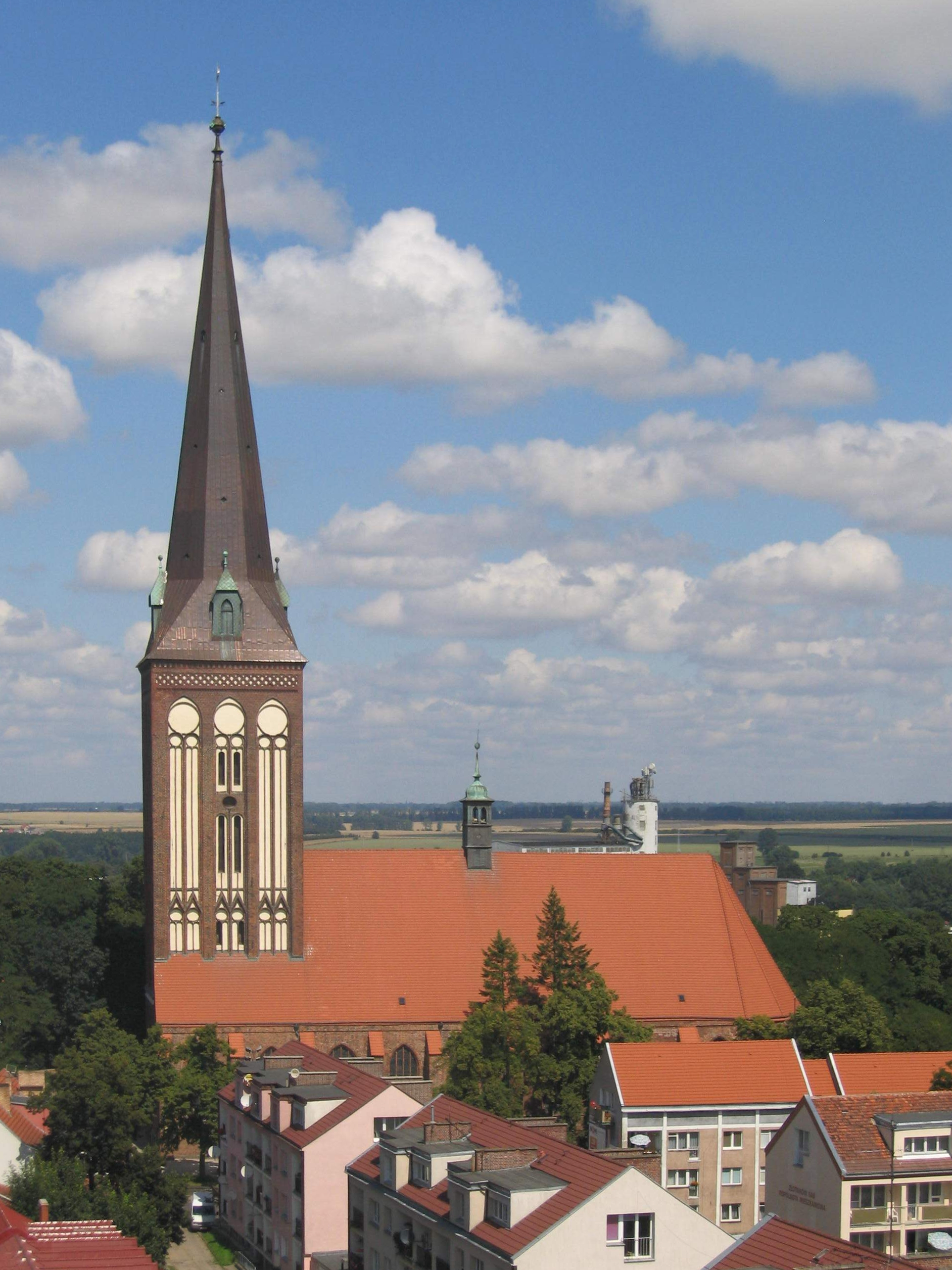
St. John's Church

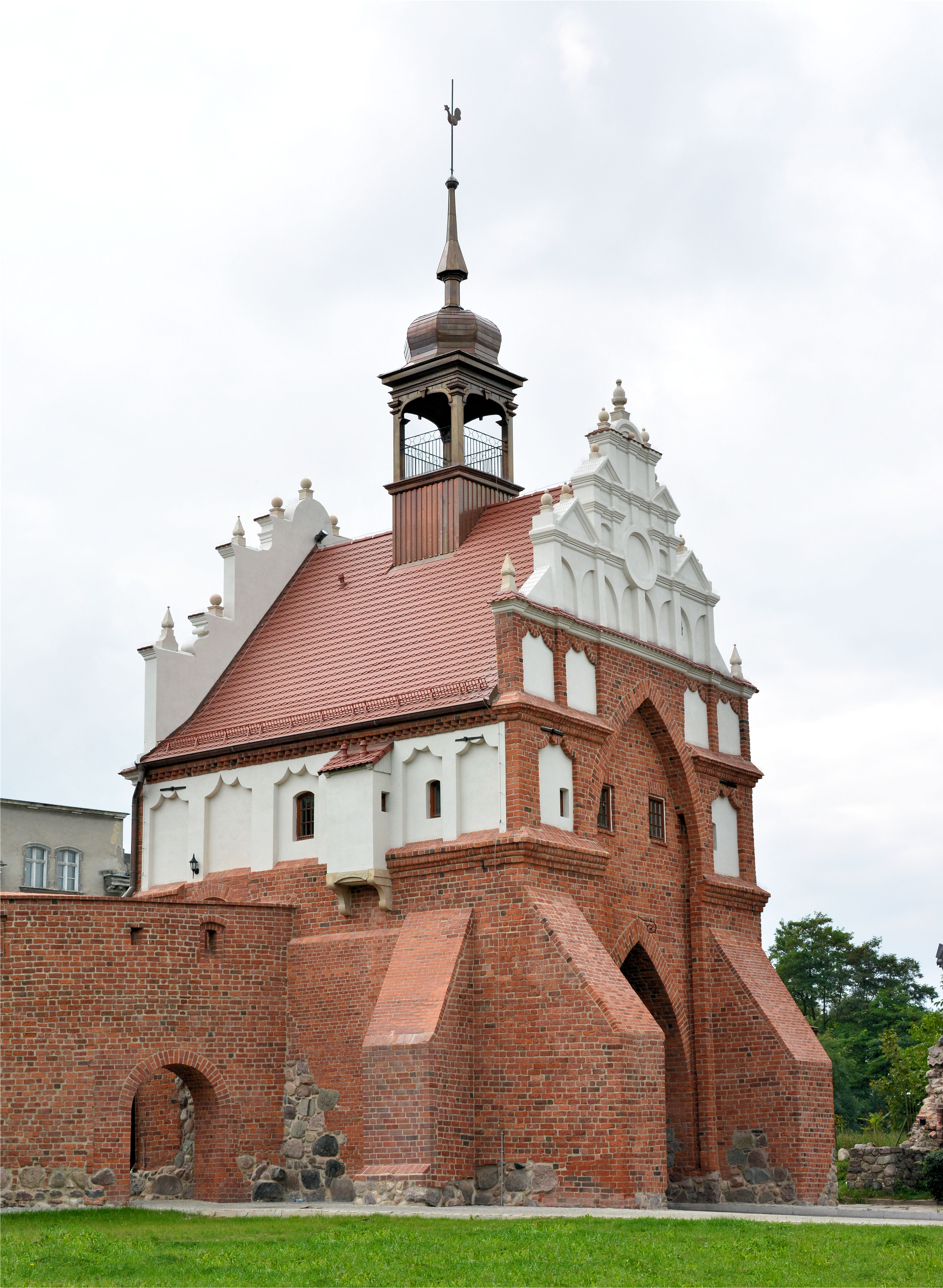
Wałowa Gate

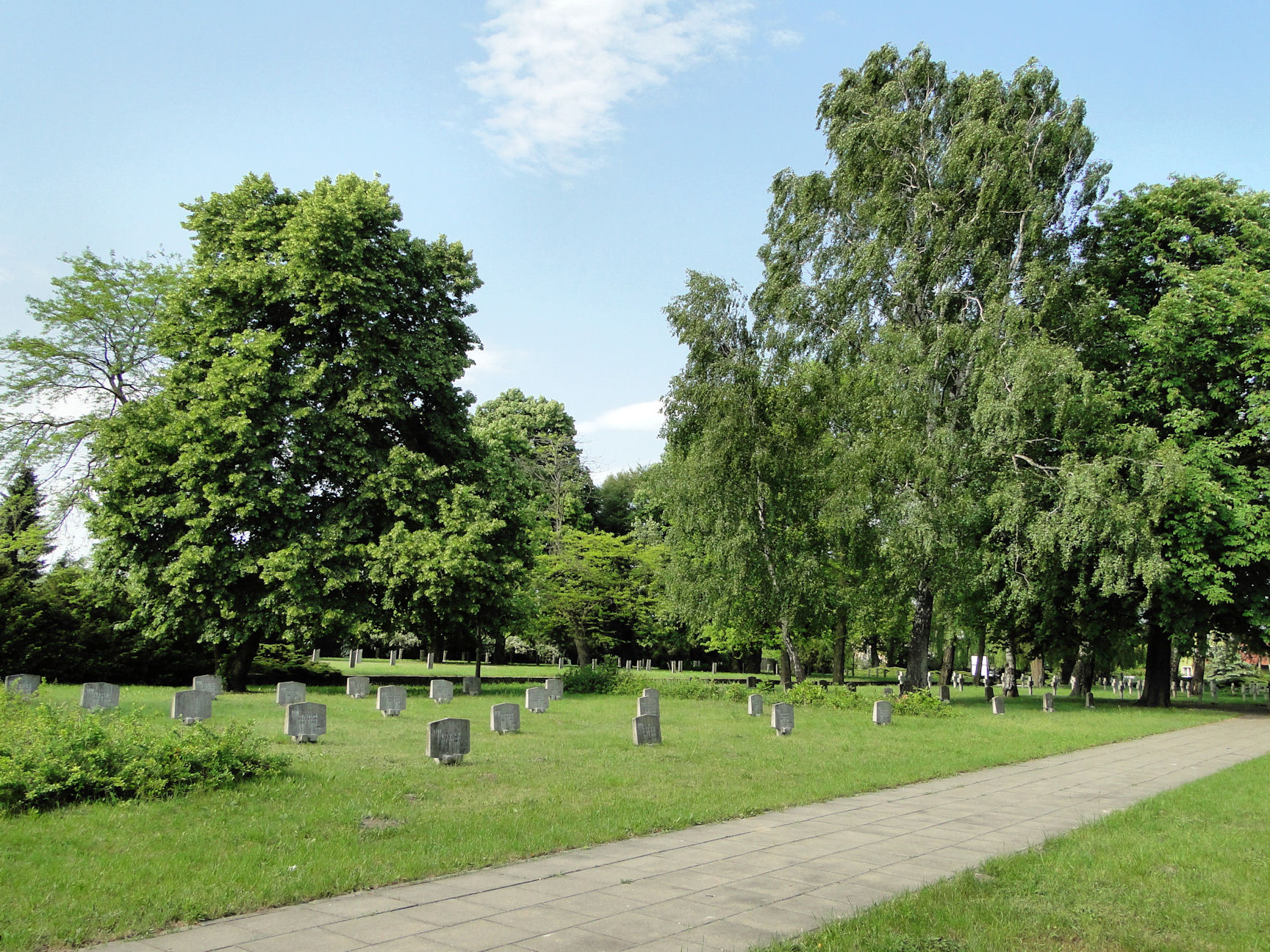
War cemetery

Heavy bombing during World War II devastated most of Stargard's fine historical sites and destroyed over 75% of the city. Some of these monuments, such as St. Mary's Church (13th–15th centuries) and the 16th-century town hall, have been rebuilt. The newly restored buildings are on the European Route of Brick Gothic. Some of the notable surviving examples include:

- St. Mary's Church, a distinctive Brick Gothic landmark of the city, dating back to the 15th century, one of the largest brick churches in Europe, listed as a Historic Monument of Poland
- St. John's Church from the 15th century
- Medieval fortifications, including ramparts, walls, gates and towers, also listed as a Historic Monument of Poland, prime examples:
  - Brama Młyńska (The Mill Gate) from the 15th century, the only Polish water gate still in existence and one of two in Europe
  - Wałowa Gate from the 15th century
  - Pyrzycka Gate from the 13th century
  - Red Sea Tower (Baszta Morze Czerwone) from 1513
  - Weavers' Tower (Baszta Tkaczy) from the 15th century
  - White Head Tower (Baszta Białogłówka) from the 15th century
- Gothic tenement houses
- Gothic Arsenal (Arsenał)

Other sites include:

- Renaissance town hall, that has been known as one of the most remarkable examples of 16th-century central European architecture
- Granary (16th century)
- The largest conciliation cross in Europe (1542)
- Bolesław I the Brave Park (Park im. Bolesława Chrobrego), the oldest and largest park in Stargard
- Jagiellonian Park (Park Jagielloński)
- Baroque guardhouse at the marketplace, now housing a museum
- Panorama Park with the Panorama Palace
- Holy Spirit church
- Church of the Transfiguration
- War cemetery where about 5,000 soldiers of various nationalities were buried during World War I and II: Polish, French, Serbian/Yugoslav, Russian/Soviet, Italian, Romanian, Belgian, British, Moroccan, Portuguese and Dutch
- The 15th Meridian Monument (Pomnik 15. Południk)
- Monument to the Victims of Siberia and Katyn
- Monuments of the Polish bards Adam Mickiewicz and Juliusz Słowacki
- Red Barracks (Czerwone Koszary), the largest military barracks in Pomerania

== Sport ==
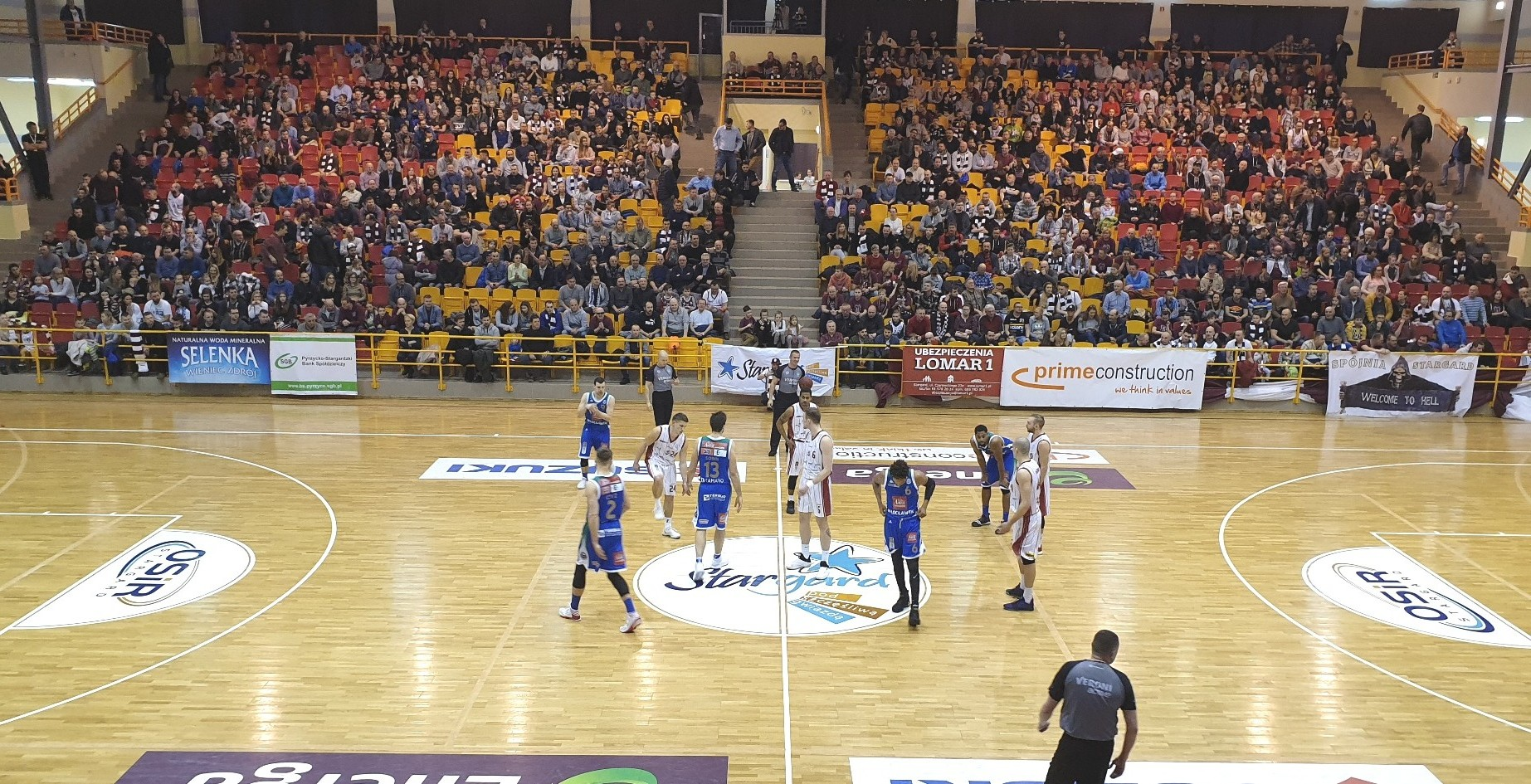
Polish Basketball League match between Spójnia Stargard and Anwil Włocławek in Stargard in 2019

The city is home to Spójnia Stargard, a men's basketball team, which competes in the Polish Basketball League (the country's top division), 1997 runners-up, and Błękitni Stargard, formerly a multi-sports club, now a men's association football team, best known for reaching the Polish Cup semi-final in 2015.

== Demographics ==
Historical population

Year	Pop.	±%
1618	12,000	—
1640	1,200	−90.0%
1688	3,600	+200.0%
1720	400	−88.9%
1740	5,529	+1282.2%
1782	5,612	+1.5%
1786	6,243	+11.2%
1794	5,971	−4.4%
1812	8,900	+49.1%
1816	8,042	−9.6%

Year	Pop.	±%
1831	9,907	+23.2%
1843	11,192	+13.0%
1852	12,473	+11.4%
1861	14,168	+13.6%
1875	20,173	+42.4%
1885	22,112	+9.6%
1900	26,858	+21.5%
1910	27,551	+2.6%
1913	28,000	+1.6%
1929	34,600	+23.6%

Year	Pop.	±%
1933	35,773	+3.4%
1939	39,760	+11.1%
1945	2,870	−92.8%
1950	20,684	+620.7%
1960	33,650	+62.7%
1970	44,460	+32.1%
1980	59,227	+33.2%
1990	71,000	+19.9%
1995	72,254	+1.8%
2010	69,633	−3.6%

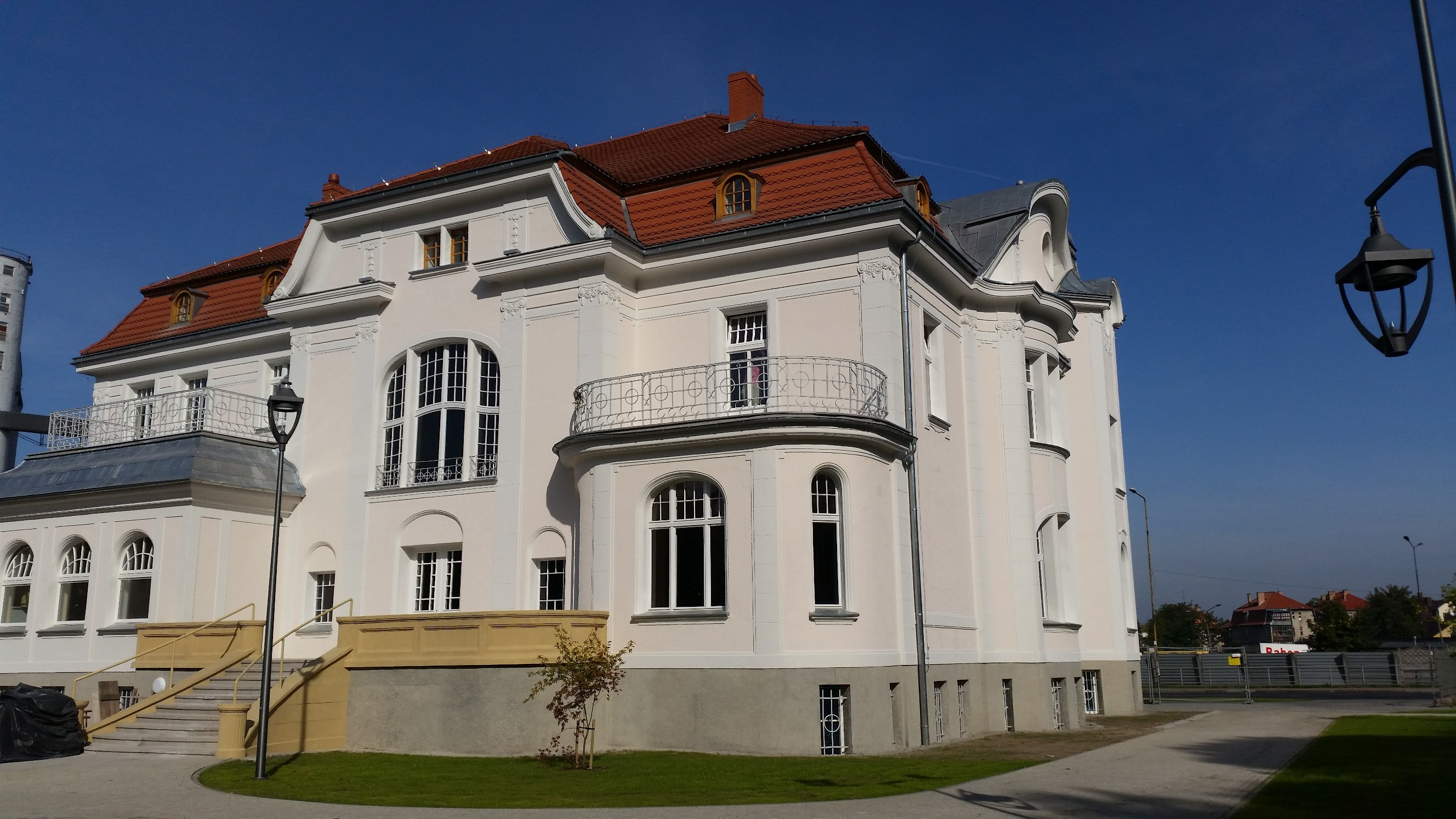
Youth Culture Centre

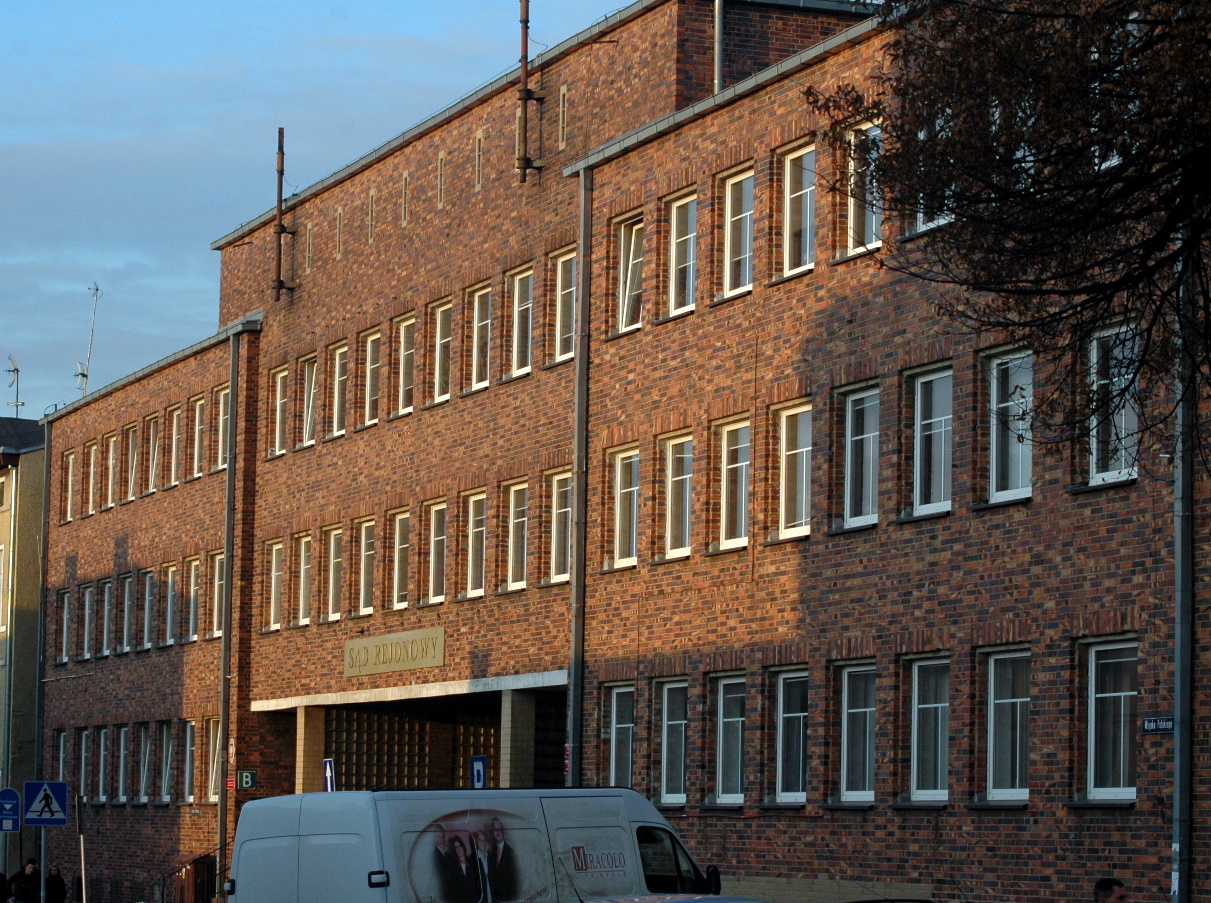
District court

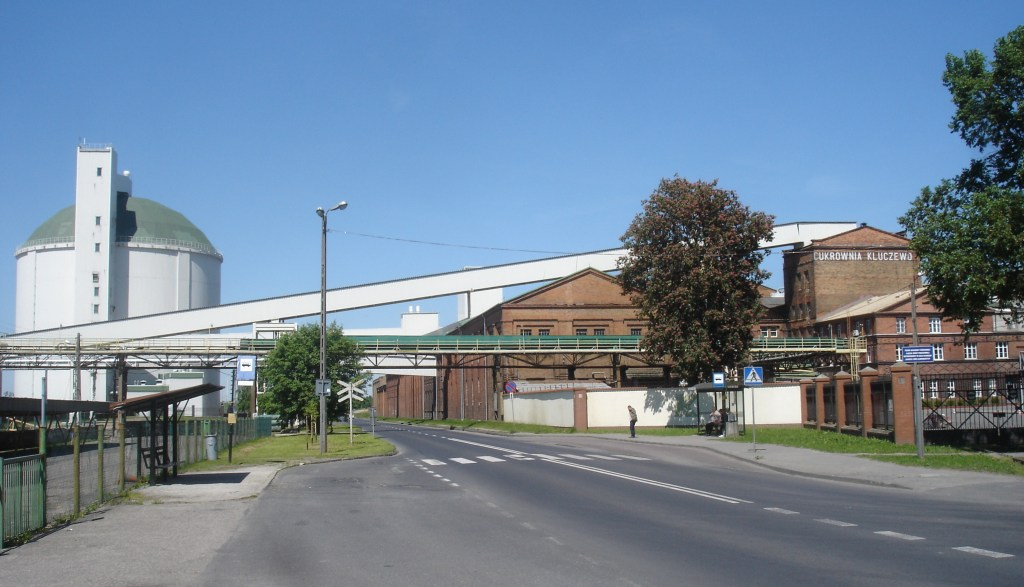
Sugar refinery in the Kluczewo district

== Notable people ==
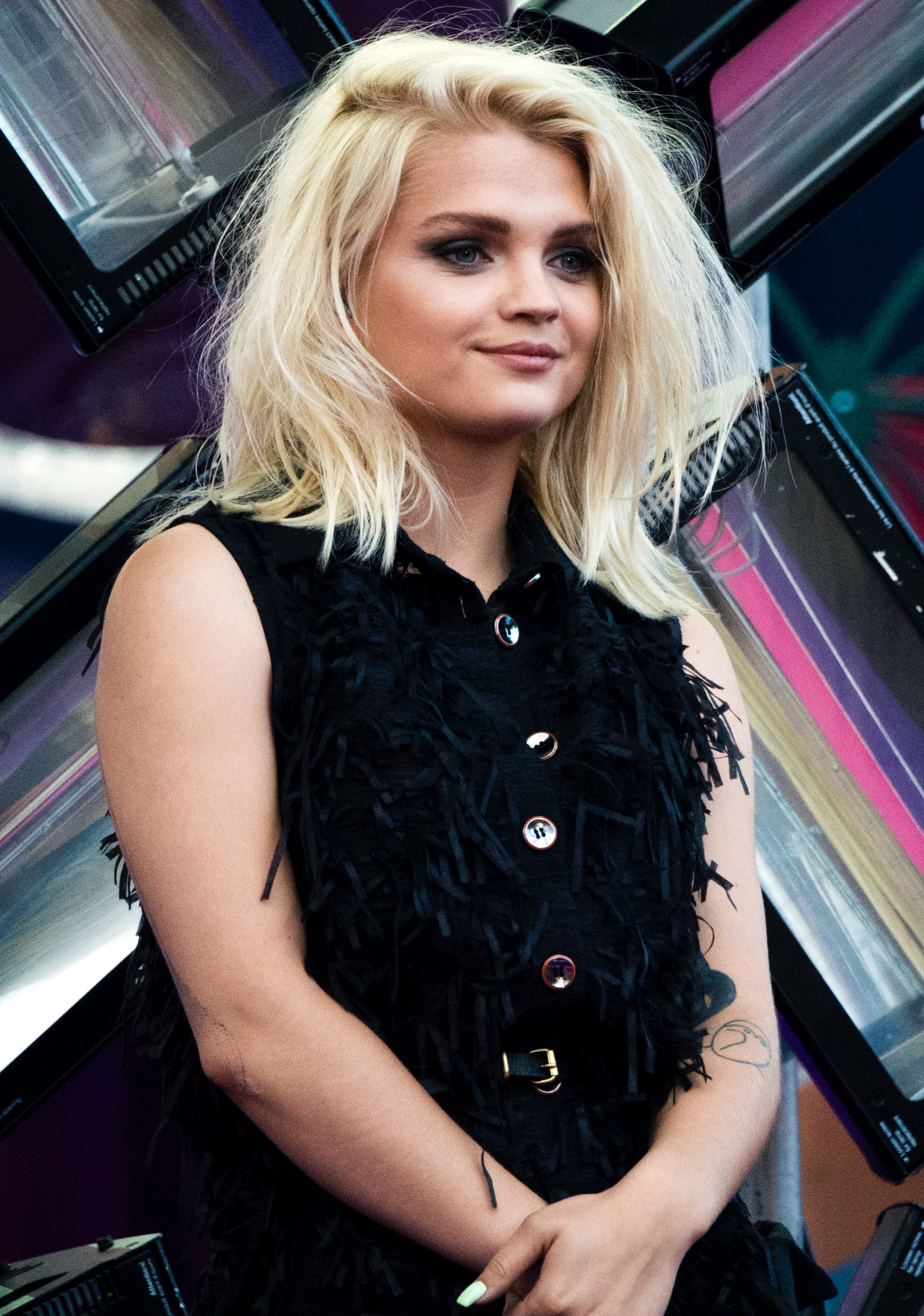
Margaret, singer-songwriter

- Karl August Ferdinand von Borcke (1776–1830), Prussian general
- Carl Wilhelm Schmidt (died 1864), missionary
- Georg Joachimsthal (1863–1914), orthopedist
- Oscar Levy (1867–1946), writer
- Max Levy (1869–1932), electro-engineer
- Werner von Blomberg (1878–1946), general
- Hasso von Wedel (1898–1961) Wehrmacht General
- Hans-Joachim von Merkatz (1905–1982) Federal Minister of Justice 1956–1957
- Claus Biederstaedt (1928–2020), actor
- Peter Karow (born 1940), entrepreneur
- Carlo von Tiedemann (1943–2025), television presenter
- Ewa Kasprzyk (born 1957), actress
- Oskar Dawicki (born 1971), multimedia artist
- Arkadiusz Bąk (born 1974), footballer
- Margaret (born 1991), singer-songwriter

== Twin towns – sister cities ==
Stargard is twinned with:

- Elmshorn, Germany
- Konotop, Ukraine
- Saldus, Latvia
- Stralsund, Germany
- Wijchen, Netherlands

== In fiction ==
In The Cross Time Engineer science fiction series of novels the main character falsely claims Stargard origin to conceal he is a time traveler.

== Works cited ==
- Barkman, Bertil C:son; Lundkvist, Sven; Tersmeden, Lars (1966). Kungl. Svea livgardes historia: 1632(1611)-1660 [History of the Royal Swedish Life Guards: 1632(1611)-1660] (in Swedish). Vol. 3:2. Stockholm: Stift. för Svea livgardes historia.
