= St. Mary's Church, Stargard =

St. Mary's Church
- Collegiate church of the Blessed Virgin Mary, Queen of the World
- Kolegiata Najświętszej Maryi Panny Królowej Świata
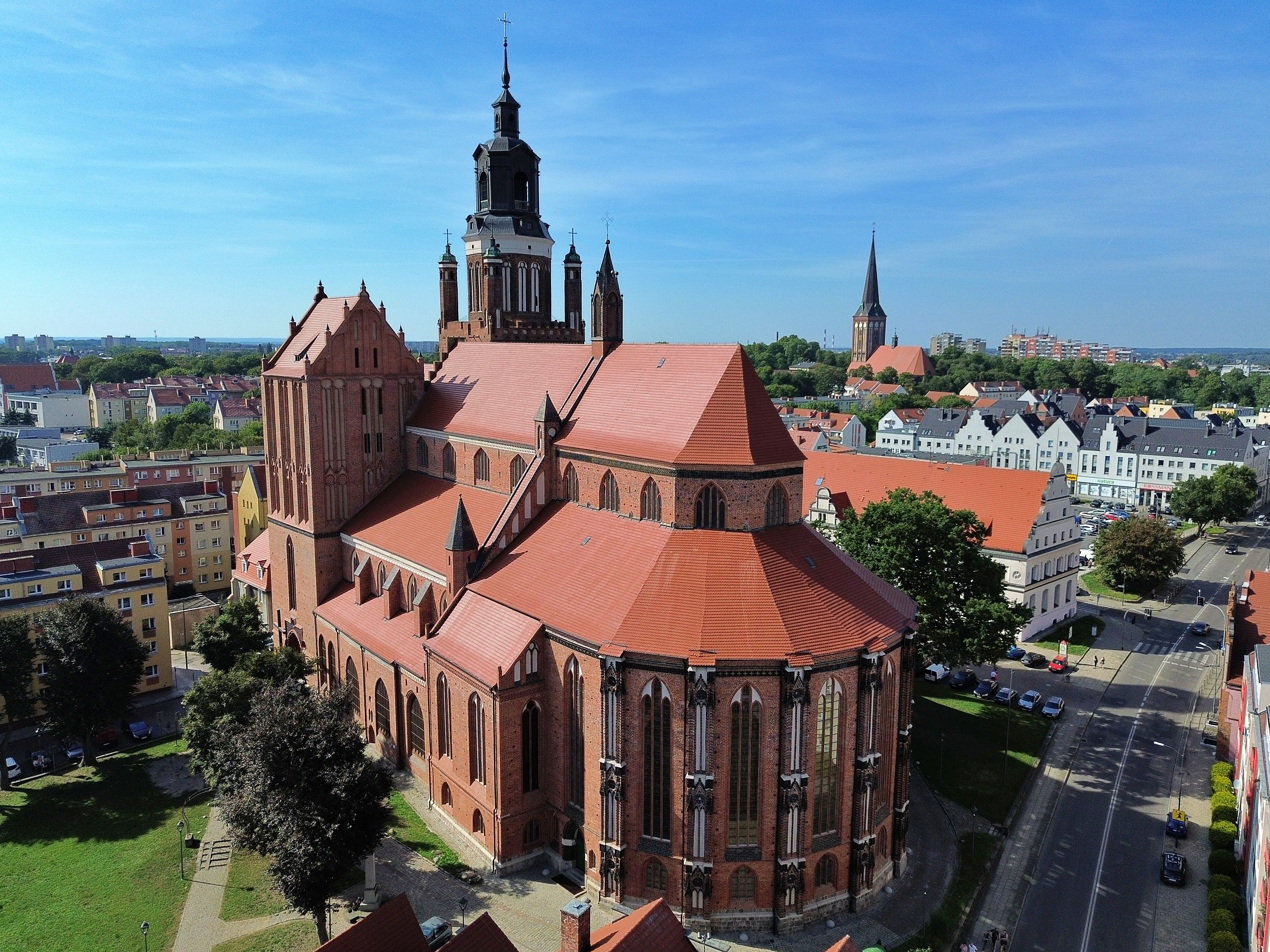

- Location within Poland
- 53°20′12″N 15°02′48″E
- Location: Stargard
- Country: Poland
- Language: Polish
- Denomination: Catholic

History
- Status: Collegiate church

Architecture
- Functional status: Active
- Style: Gothic

Administration
- Archdiocese: Szczecin-Kamień

Historic Monument of Poland
- Designated: 2010-09-17
- Reference no.: Dz. U. z 2010 r. Nr 184, poz. 1236

The Collegiate church of the Blessed Virgin Mary, Queen of the World (Polish: Kolegiata Najświętszej Marii Panny Królowej Świata) Stargard, or simply the St. Mary's Church, is a noted architectural monument in Polish Pomerania. It closes the eastern part of the Old Town Market. The monument is a part of the European Route of Brick Gothic. It is a collegiate church, but inhabitants of the town commonly call it "the A Cathedral".

== History ==
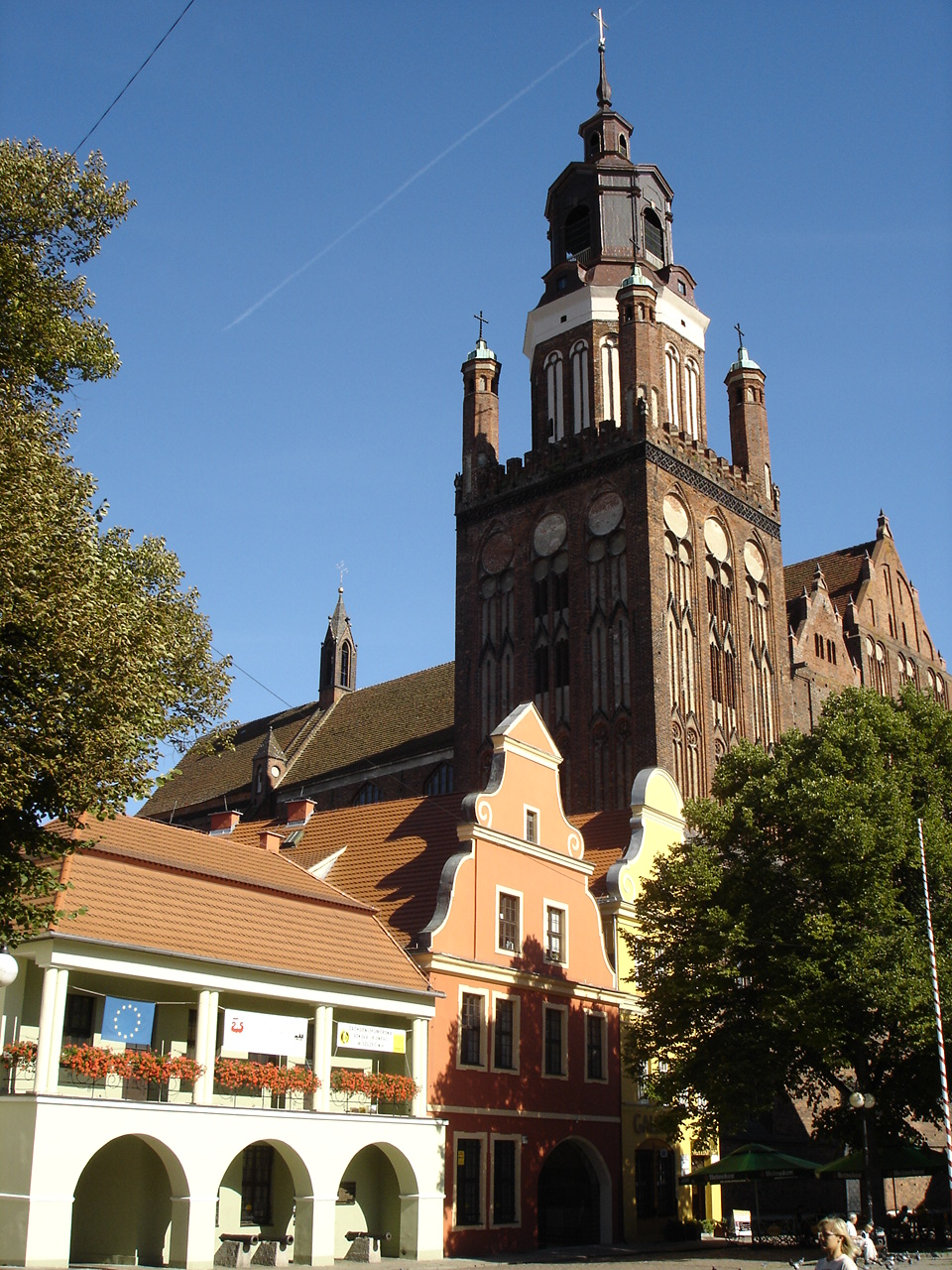

The oldest known mention of the Church's existence is from writings in the year 1248. The bishop of Cammin, having returned Stargard to Duke Barnim I, stipulated his law to the church.

The Church, in a quickly developing Stargard, became too small for regular attendants. In 1292, construction started on a new and more impressive place of worship. In this phase, the Church had a three nave structure, with all naves of equal height, and no tower. The cathedral can be classified to the cathedrals of the Wendic quarter, typical of the Hanseatic towns in area. The polygonal choir stall has a 5/8 conclusion similar to the St. Mary's Church of Lübeck. In the period from 1388 to about 1500, the last expansion of the structure emerged with the construction of the Presbytery and towers.

The church and adjoining city walls represent one of Poland's official national Historic Monuments (Pomnik historii), as designated on October 4, 2010. Its listing is maintained by the National Heritage Board of Poland.
